= Sprague Avenue (Spokane, Washington) =

Major east–west street serving Spokane

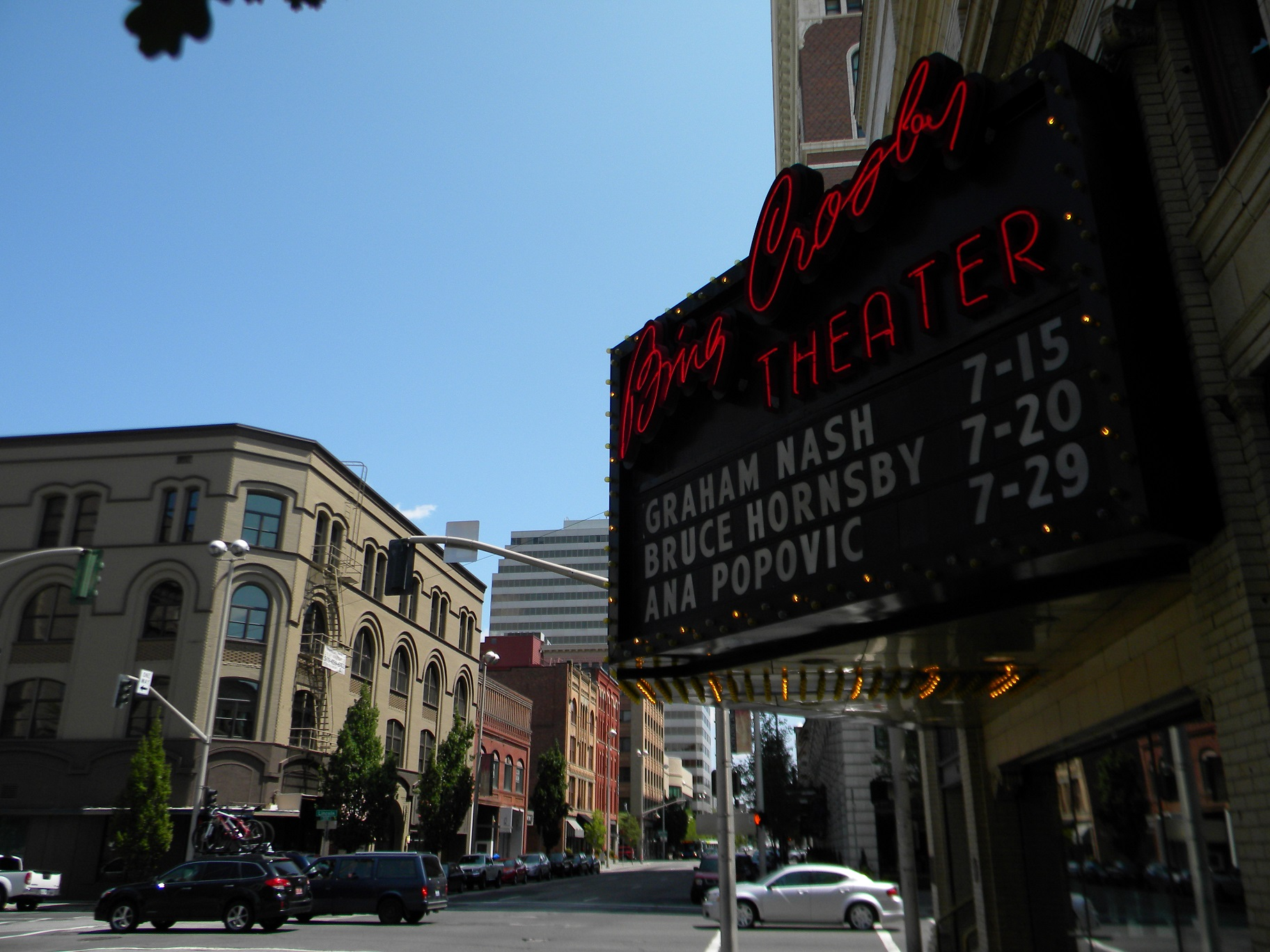
- Looking east on Sprague Ave. in Spokane
- Part of: I-90 BL
- Type: Arterial street
- Maintained by: City of Spokane, City of Spokane Valley, City of Liberty Lake
- Length: 16.7 mi (26.9 km)
- Location: Spokane, Washington and surrounding cities
- West end: Downtown Spokane near Maple Street
- Major junctions: US 395 / US 2 (Division Street) in Downtown Spokane; I-90 in Spokane Valley; SR 27 (Pines Road)
- East end: Liberty Lake, Washington, near Ridgeline High School

Sprague Avenue is a major east–west street serving Spokane, Spokane Valley, and Liberty Lake, Washington, United States. It travels approximately 17 miles (27 km), extending from Downtown Spokane eastward through Spokane Valley as an arterial road, and continues on as a collector road to its eastern terminus in Liberty Lake.

Additional segments of Sprague Avenue exist on the West Plains of the Spokane area as a collector road in the City of Airway Heights, near Northern Quest Resort & Casino, and as Sprague Road, an unpaved farm road in rural portions of western Spokane County near the border with neighboring Lincoln County. While these two segments are entirely discontinuous with the main portion of Sprague Avenue and not generally considered part of that road, they follow the alignment of Sprague Avenue through Spokane and Spokane Valley and also continue the house numbering system from Spokane.

== History ==
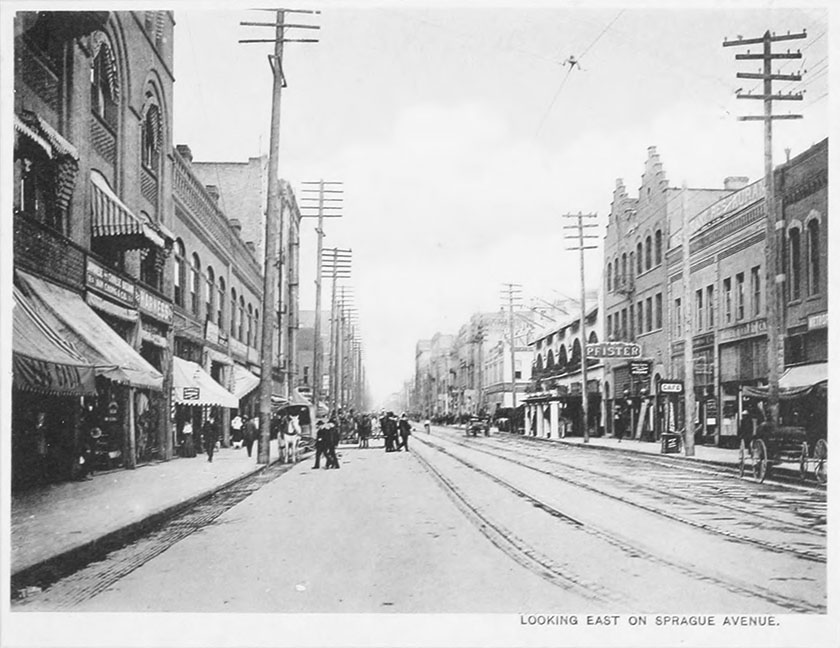
Sprague Avenue looking east, 1890

Sprague Avenue was named after Northern Pacific Railroad executive and former Civil War General John W. Sprague by city founder, James N. Glover. Glover hoped naming a street in Sprague's honor would sway him to route the transcontinental railway his company was constructing through the budding town. Sprague Avenue became part of a transcontinental highway that linked Chicago and the Twin Cities in the Midwest to Seattle. In the 1920s, Sprague Avenue was the longest continuous stretch of road in the city and once billed as the "most traveled street in Spokane", connecting downtown Spokane to the suburban farming communities in the Spokane Valley, the Spokesman-Review reported in 1926 that "thousands of tourists traverse it during the summer season. Hundreds of suburbanites and Valley farmers use it daily."

== Street grid ==
Sprague Avenue plays a major role in Spokane's street grid and house numbering system, which was established by the Spokane City Council in the early 1890s.

Ordinance A121, which set the system that Spokane still uses to this day, was passed by Spokane City Council on November 4, 1891. The ordinance identified Sprague Avenue along with Division Street, another major arterial in Spokane, as meridians to split the city up into four quadrants, referred to as the Northeast, Southeast, Northwest, and Southwest Divisions in the ordinance's language.

Sprague Avenue establishes the numbering system for roads running in the north—south direction. All roads running northward from Sprague (in the Northwest and Northeast Divisions) utilize an "N" prefix in their address, with odd numbers running along the west side of those roads and even numbers running along the east side. Address numbers start at 1, and increase moving north. Roads running southward from Sprague (in the Southwest and Southeast Divisions) utilize an "S" prefix in their address. The numbering in these two southern divisions is opposite of their northern counterparts; odd numbers run along the east side of the road and even numbers run along the west side. Address numbers start at 1, and increase moving south.

Sprague Avenue's intersection with Division Street in Downtown Spokane is significant, marking the (0, 0) origin point for house numbering and cardinal direction prefixes for roads throughout the Spokane area. Additionally, because Division establishes the prefixes and odd—even numbering rules for roads running in the east—west direction, it also divides Sprague into East Sprague (where odd numbers run along the north side of the road and even numbers along the south) and West Sprague (where odd numbers run along the south side of the road and even numbers along the north).

== Route description ==
=== Spokane ===
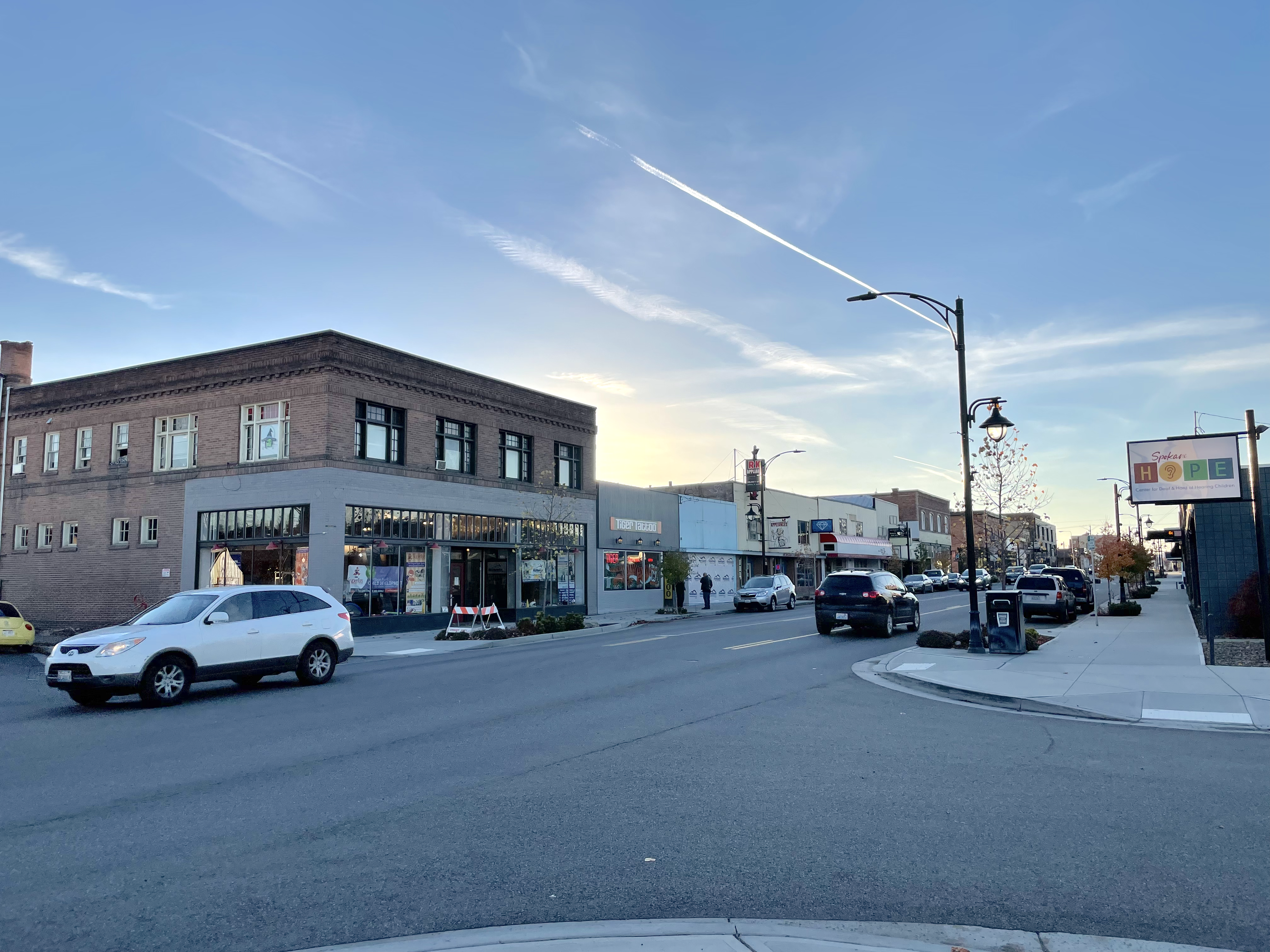
Sprague at Magnolia in East Central, showing the recent conversion to one lane in each direction.

Sprague Avenue in Spokane spans from the city's eastern border with neighboring Spokane Valley, to its western terminus in Downtown Spokane at Riverside Avenue adjacent to the Maple Street Bridge. In Downtown, Sprague runs as a one-way street for 0.75 miles (1.21 km), carrying traffic westbound beginning at Bernard Street, in front of the Spokane Intermodal Center, until its terminus with Riverside. Along this segment, Sprague passes through the core of Downtown. Notable locations along this stretch of Sprague, from east to west, include the Ridpath Club Apartments, the STA Plaza, The Davenport Hotel, the Bing Crosby Theater, the Fox Theater and the KHQ-TV studios.

East of Bernard Street, Sprague runs as a two-way street, continuing through the rest of Downtown and passing through the University District and East Central neighborhood on its way into Spokane Valley. Recent projects by the City of Spokane have renovated and revitalized the streetscape along a majority of this two-way section of Sprague in hopes of spurring economic development, in hopes of replicating the result prior projects like this in other parts of Spokane, including Market Street in the Hillyard neighborhood, and South Perry District in the East Central neighborhood.

=== Spokane Valley ===
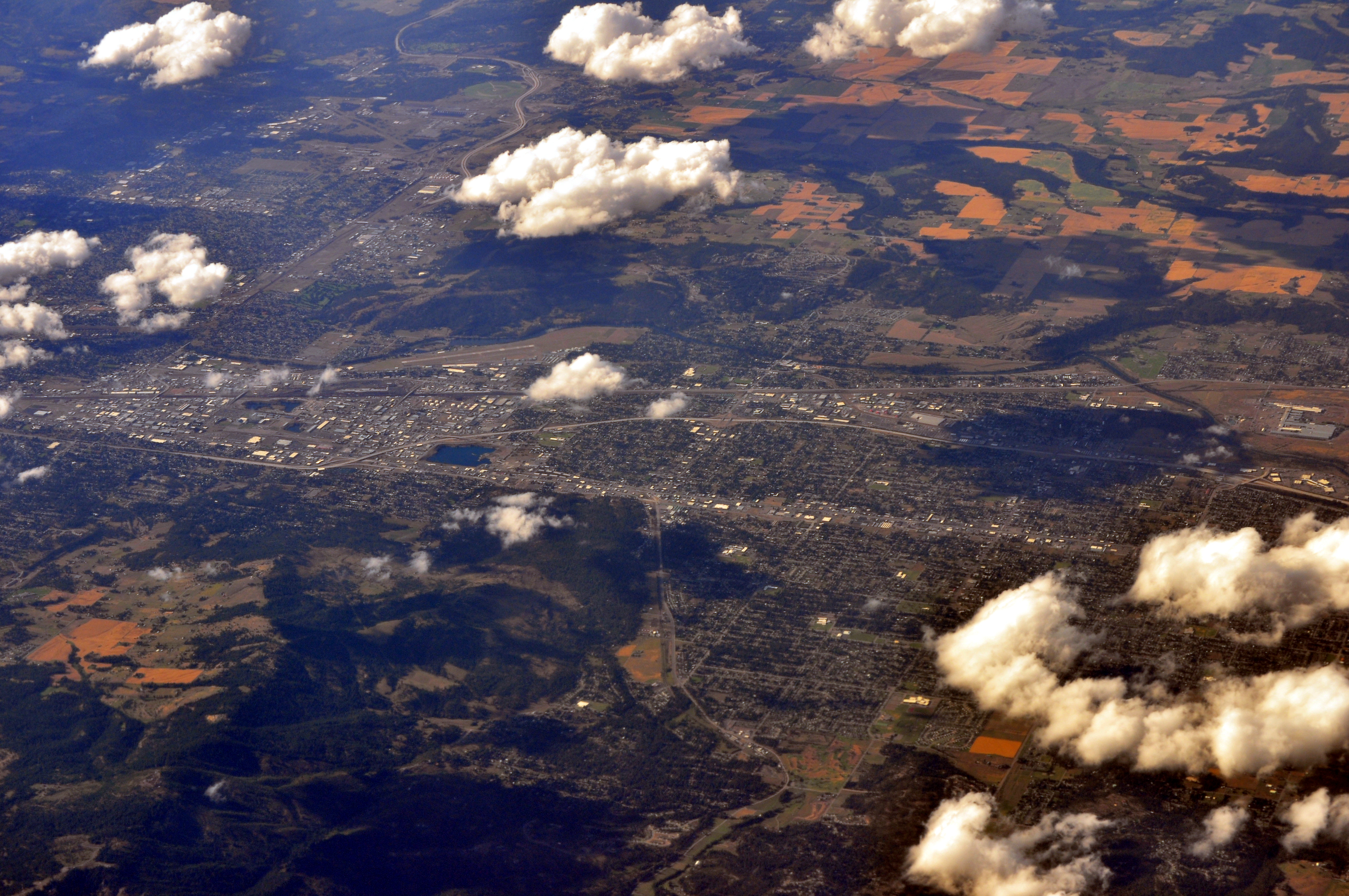
Aerial of Sprague Avenue running through Spokane Valley

In Spokane Valley, Sprague runs as a major arterial, part of a one-way couplet with the adjacent Appleway Boulevard one block to its south. The couplet was originally constructed by Spokane County in 2000, pre-dating Spokane Valley' incorporation as a city in 2003, as a way to alleviate congestion on nearby Interstate 90. with Sprague Avenue carrying westbound traffic and Appleway Boulevard carrying eastbound traffic. The couplet stretches for about 2.5 miles (4.0 km) from Sprague's interchange with I-90 eastward toward University Road where it currently ends. Appleway Boulevard was constructed in the former right of way of the Milwaukee Railroad and initial plans had Appleway being extended through the rest of this right of way.

The couplet has not been without controversy. Due to the couplet's effect of reducing ease-of-access to businesses along the formerly two-way Sprague Avenue, business began to suffer after its construction. By the time Spokane Valley was incorporated several years later, there was a debate about the future of the couplet. Many members of the community, business leaders, and city leaders pushed strongly to convert Sprague back into a two-way street. Others wanted to continue the couplet's original vision and extend it further into Spokane Valley, which would have taken it through most of the city, almost to its border with neighboring Liberty Lake. As of 2020, the couplet remains as constructed nearly two decades earlier, and most of its planned future alignment east of University Road has had a pedestrian trail constructed in its right of way.

The easternmost 1.7 miles (2.7 km) portion of Sprague in Spokane Valley runs as a local collector roadway. In this area, Appleway Boulevard picks up the arterial function from Sprague, branching off toward the east-northeast toward Liberty Lake.

=== Liberty Lake ===
Sprague Avenue in Liberty Lake is non-contiguous with the main portion of Sprague in Spokane Valley due to topography. It runs as a local collector roadway in the city, serving the residential neighborhood located on the lake's northern shore and also forms the southern boundary of the Liberty Lake Golf Course.

=== Other segments ===
Several other segments of Sprague run in the western portions of Spokane County. These segments are not generally considered part of the main part of Sprague Avenue, but the segments follow the alignment of Sprague and also continue its house numbering system. In Airway Heights, Sprague Avenue runs as a local collector road, serving the Northern Quest Resort & Casino, Spokane County Raceway, the Geiger Corrections Center, and terminates at the entrance to the Airway X Motocross Park. West of Airway Heights, Sprague Avenue's name changes to Sprague Road, and runs as an unpaved farm access road until the Lincoln County border.

== Character ==
Similar to North Division Street in Spokane, the majority of Sprague Avenue is flanked by commercial development through most of its length in the Spokane Valley.

Sprague Avenue in downtown goes through the Davenport Arts District where there are many entertainment venues such as the Fox Theater, Knitting Factory, and Bing Crosby Theater all located next door to each other. About four blocks west is one of the primary destinations for nightlife in the city (the other being the West Main Ave. area near Division Street). This section of Sprague, especially between the one-way streets of Stevens and Washington has one of the highest concentrations of bars and night clubs in the city.

East of downtown, historically East Sprague Avenue, particularly near the East Central neighborhood has had a seedy reputation. The area has been considered the red light district of Spokane and was where serial killer Robert Lee Yates found many of his victims that worked in the sex trade in the 1990s. In 2015, a city ordinance and awareness signage that designates it as an area of "high prostitution activity" have been installed; in such an area there are added punitive penalties for those arrested on prostitution related charges. With the major redevelopment of the East Sprague corridor in 2017, the neighborhood hopes to shed this image.

== Public Transportation ==
Various portions of Sprague Avenue are served by different Spokane Transit Authority routes due to the presence of two of STA's transit centers (STA Plaza and the Pence-Cole Valley Transit Center) along the road, but the most notable routes that run along Sprague are 9, 61 and 98, which serve the road locally in Airway Heights, along its entire length in Spokane, and through most of its length in Spokane Valley. Sprague Avenue in Liberty Lake does not have any transit service.

Sprague Avenue has been identified corridor that will serve Spokane Transit's High Performance Transit Network. Since the passage of STA's Proposition 1 in 2016, which improves transit service throughout the Spokane area, Sprague Avenue has undergone transit service and amenity upgrades, with more planned in the future.

Many portions of the Sprague Avenue corridor were also identified in the early 2000s as the preferred alignment for a regional light rail system in Spokane. However, the light rail proposal and associated planning never made it past a 2006 advisory vote by the general public.

== Points of Interest ==
- Liberty Lake, Washington, including its eponymous lake
- Ridgeline High School
- Pence-Cole Valley Transit Center
- University District
- Downtown Spokane
- STA Plaza
- Downtown Spokane Dog Park
- Airway Heights Corrections Center
