= History of high-capacity transit in Spokane, Washington =

Spokane, Washington is currently home to a limited number of bus rapid transit lines. These are the only forms of high-capacity transit in the city. Historically, however, Spokane possessed a number of streetcar lines. A voter initiative to approve the development of a light rail system was defeated in 2006.

== Early 2000s light rail proposal ==
In 2000, the boards of Spokane Transit Authority and Spokane Regional Transportation Council established a steering committee, formally known as the Light Rail Steering Committee, to evaluate a high-capacity transit route between Downtown Spokane and Liberty Lake to serve the growing I-90 corridor through the Spokane metropolitan area.

=== Vision ===
The vision for a regional light rail system consisted of a line that would serve urban development along the east-west I-90 corridor, connecting Spokane to Coeur d'Alene, Idaho, and a second line serving North Spokane.

Early efforts focused on developing an initial line from Downtown Spokane to Liberty Lake. Future extensions would length the line west to Spokane International Airport and east to Coeur d'Alene, Idaho. A future line serving North Spokane would largely run along the North Spokane Corridor, which was originally designed to accommodate a high-capacity transit line (such as light rail) in its median.

=== Final recommendation ===
Culminating six years of study, the Light Rail Steering Committee made a final recommendation to the STA and SRTC of vehicle type and alignment. The final recommendation called for the light rail to run along a 15.5-mile alignment from Downtown Spokane to Liberty Lake, with 14 stations. As part of an effort to contain costs, the system would utilize diesel multiple unit light rail train sets (eliminating the need for overhead electric infrastructure), and its alignment would largely consist of a single, bi-directional shared track, with areas of a second passing track.

==== Stations ====
The proposed light rail line would have consisted of 14 stations, 7 of which would have included park and rides:

List of proposed Spokane–Liberty Lake Light Rail stations
Station	Location	Notes
STA Plaza	Riverside Avenue, between Post Street and Wall Street	Western Terminus
Convention Center	Riverside Avenue, between Bernard Street and Browne Street	Stretch of roadway now hosts the westbound Riverside & Bernard City Line station
Riverpoint (Trent)	On undeveloped land north of BNSF railway tracks on WSU Spokane campus	Serving the Riverpoint Higher Education Park and University District
Napa	Riverside Avenue, just east of Napa Street	
East Central	On undeveloped land in the Union Pacific Railroad right of way, just east of Freya Street	
Fairgrounds	South side of Spokane County Fair and Expo Center site	Proposed Park and Ride
Park	On undeveloped land in Union Pacific	Option to construct as a future infill station
Argonne	Intersection of Argonne Road and Appleway Boulevard	Proposed Park and Ride
University City	Adjacent to Pence-Cole Valley Transit Center	Shared park and ride facility with existing transit center
Pines	On undeveloped land in abandoned railroad right of way at intersection east of Pines Road	Proposed Park and Ride
Evergreen	On undeveloped land in abandoned railroad right of way at intersection east of Evergreen Road	
Sullivan	On undeveloped land in abandoned railroad right of way at intersection with Sullivan Road	Proposed Park and Ride
Appleway	On undeveloped land near I-90/Appleway interchange	Proposed Park and Ride
Liberty Lake	Adjacent to existing STA Liberty Lake Park and Ride	Eastern Terminus, shared park and ride facility, with option to redevelop existing park and ride

=== Public vote ===
In August 2006, following the final project recommendations of the Light Rail Steering Committee, the Spokane Transit Authority Board approved two advisory questions to appear in November 2006 general election ballots. The first question would inquire voters about tasking STA to develop a funding plan for the project. The second question would ask voters if STA should use an existing $5 million worth of funds to start preliminary engineering work. The advisory questions would be used by STA to gauge the community's desire to continue to develop the project.

Both advisory measures were defeated by voters. The first question regarding development of a funding plan failed 54% to 46%, and the vote using existing funds to continue with preliminary engineering, design and environmental analysis lost, albeit by a narrow margin, 52% to 48%.

Going into the election, it was felt that the defeat of both advisory questions would put a pause to the project.

=== Subsequent actions and efforts ===
The Light Rail Steering Committee was officially disbanded in December 2006, just one month after Spokane County voters turned down two advisory votes to advance the proposed light rail project.

In an effort to leave open the possibility of revisiting the light rail proposal in the future, the STA Board voted to approve $5 million to help support right of way acquisition along the route's proposed alignment.

== Downtown Spokane streetcar ==
Rail-based urban transportation had historically been a part of Spokane's development in the early 20th century, with numerous streetcars and trolleys running through the city's core. However, as the automobile gained in popularity throughout the century, the streetcars and their tracks were eventually phased out in favor of buses.

In 1999, a revival of rail transit in Spokane was discussed, with vision documents in Spokane's Downtown Plan calling for the development of a modern streetcar line in Downtown Spokane. By the early 2000s, Local leaders in Spokane, representing three the Downtown Spokane Partnership, Spokane Regional Transportation Council, and Spokane Transit Authority partnered to study the feasibility of implementing a fixed-rail streetcar system in Downtown Spokane. Citing benefits from the Portland Streetcar, which opened in 2001, leaders were drawn the potential for the project to spur investment and development in Downtown Spokane.

=== Vision ===
In 2005, the vision to develop a streetcar line was officially adopted as a project by Spokane Transit Authority and the agency commissioned a streetcar feasibility study in partnership with other local transportation and planning agencies. The report, titled Spokane Streetcar Feasibility Study, was released in March 2006 and studied a number of topics related to installing a streetcar line in Spokane, including potential routes, alignments, vehicles, costs, and urban development potential.

Alignments would have run primarily within the right of way on existing streets through Spokane, providing easy customer access and having little impact on curbside downtown parking.

==== Alignment alternatives ====
The geography of Downtown Spokane and its surrounding areas is bisected by the Spokane River, with major destinations and points of interest on either side of it. With limited opportunities for a streetcar to cross the river and connect these destinations, the feasibility study proposed a strategy that utilized multiple streetcar lines to move people between these destinations. Separate lines would serve key areas north of the river, such as the Spokane County Government Center and the Spokane Arena, and areas south of the river such as the Browne's Addition neighborhood, Downtown Core, and University District. To facilitate transfers, the two lines would intersect and cross over one another in Downtown Spokane.

Visualizations of the streetcar's alignment were included in the feasibility study, several of which highlighted the never-built northern line and its transformative presence through Riverfront Park and along Mallon Avenue in front of the Spokane Veterans Memorial Arena.

A total of five alignment alternatives were developed as part of the study and focused on serving neighborhoods and areas within the immediate vicinity of the Downtown Spokane core, including Browne's Addition to the west; North Bank, Spokane County government campus, and Kendall Yards to the north; University District to the east, and Medical District to the south:

- Alignment Alternative A was known as the Downtown Plan. It consisted of three separate lines, one running north–south through Downtown Spokane from the North Bank neighborhood to the Lower South Hill and Medical District. It would intersect two lines running west–east across the city. One of these intersecting lines would run along the north bank of the Spokane River, from Kendall Yards, through the Spokane County government campus, past the Spokane Arena, and onward to Gonzaga University. The other west–east line would run south of the Spokane River, from Browne's Addition, through the Downtown Spokane core, and onward into the University District.
- Alignment Alternative B was known as The Basic. It was a simplified two-line version of Alternative A, eliminating the west–east line that along the north bank of the Spokane River between Kendall Yards and Gonzaga University. It maintained the north–south line in Alternative A, but extended the southern west–east line to serve Gonzaga.
- Alignment Alternative C was known as Basic-Expanded. Based on Alternative B, the proposed routing take the proposed northern-terminus in the North Bank neighborhood and move it west into Kendall Yards. The result would be a simplified two-line system that would still serve every destination covered in Alignment Alternative A.
- Alignment Alternative D was known as West-East. This two-line alternative was based on Alternative Alignment C, but instead of a mere intersection of the two lines in the Downtown Core, both lines would overlap one another and operate on a common east–west roadway through the Downtown Spokane core. This arrangement would allow for greater transfer opportunities between the two lines as well as the benefit of providing direct service to any of the four end-of-line termini from Downtown Spokane without needing to make a transfer.
- Alignment Alternative E was known as Loop-Plus. The fifth proposed alignment utilized a single line that operated in a loop pattern. The route would begin in Kendall Yards, running through the Spokane County government campus, pass by the Spokane Arena and turn south to the Downtown Core through Riverfront Park. From the Downtown Core, it would proceed south through the Medical District, loop back north through the University District and turn west back through the Downtown Core, intersecting its aforementioned north–south leg, and continue onward to its terminus in Browne's Addition. While the alternative presented the simplicity of only operating a single line, several disadvantages were identified including the length of the line, the lack of direct service to Gonzaga University, and the need to cross the line over Interstate 90 and BNSF railroad track.

Spokane's streetcar feasibility study evolved into Spokane's first bus rapid transit line, City Line.

== Bus rapid transit ==
=== City Line ===
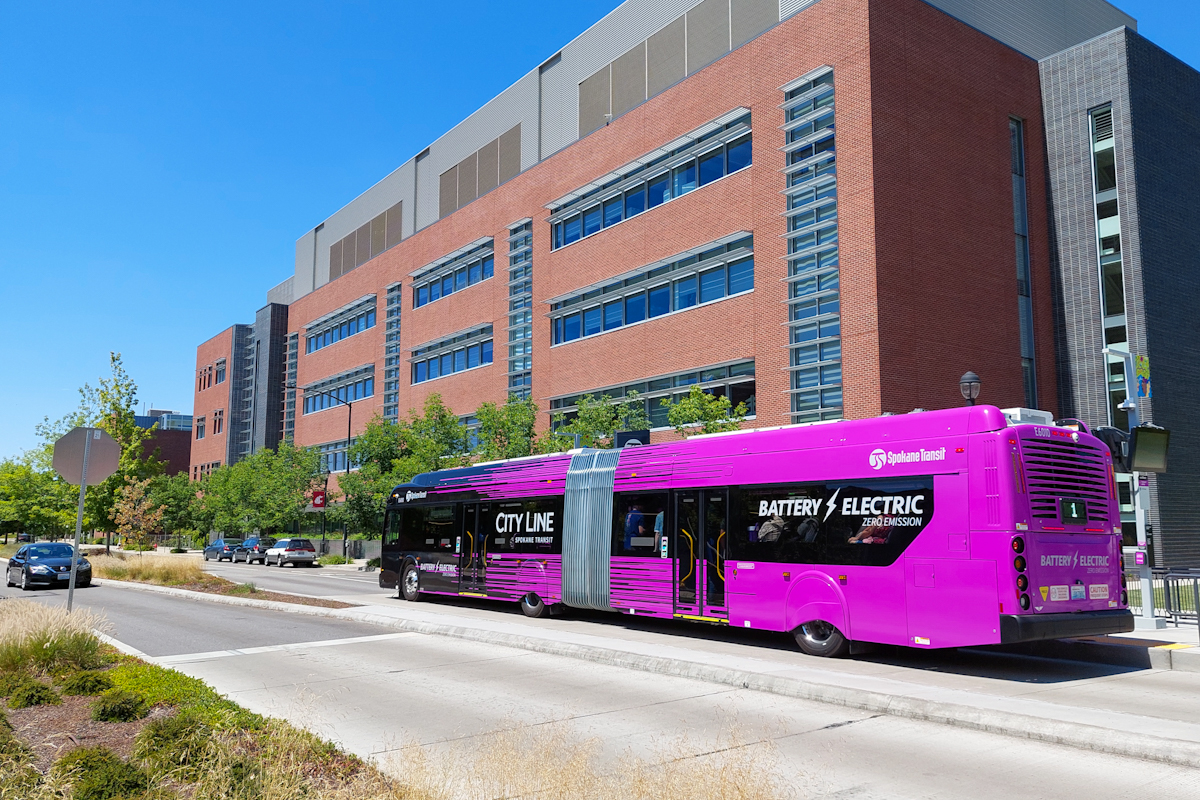

Outcomes of the Spokane Streetcar Feasibility Study were adopted into a project in 2011, with a working title of the Central City Line. A preliminary alignment would run from Browne's Addition, through the Downtown Core, to the University District, with a proposed extension continuing further east to Spokane Community College.

The mode of transportation for the Central City Line evolved from the feasibility study's fixed-rail streetcar into a lower-cost trolleybus. However, despite the change in vehicle type, local business community maintained that the vehicles needed to electric and appear streetcar and train-like. Inspired by aesthetic appeal of trolley buses in Europe, early visions for the project called for utilizing a modern trolley bus in order to differentiate the project from traditional-looking North American trolleybuses.

Further evolutions to the project resulted in the Central City Line ultimately becoming a bus rapid transit line utilizing battery-electric buses.

City Line opened on July 15, 2023, as the region's first bus rapid transit line.

=== Division Bus Rapid Transit ===
Spokane Transit Authority has begun work on the region's second bus rapid transit line, to be operated on Division Street from Downtown Spokane to the northern areas of Spokane.
