= Valley Transit Center =

Valley Transit Center may refer to:

- Fashion Valley Transit Center in San Diego, California
- Pence-Cole Valley Transit Center in Spokane, Washington
- Victor Valley Transportation Center in Victorville, California
