= Fox Theater (Spokane, Washington) =

Performing arts venue and former movie theater in Spokane, Washington, US

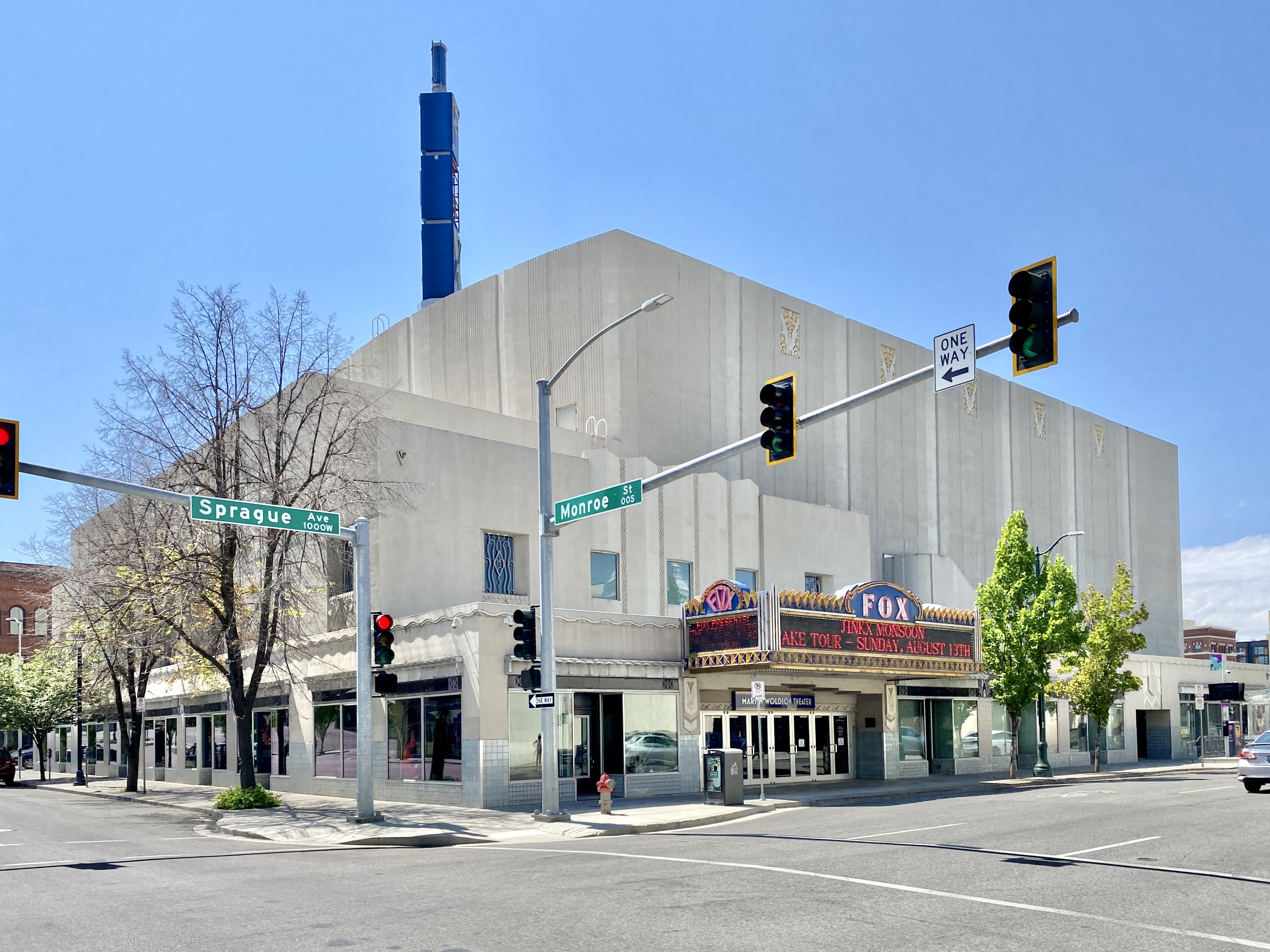
- Fox Theater in 2023
- Interactive map of Fox Theater
- Full name: Martin Woldson Theater at the FOX
- Address: 1001 W. Sprague Ave. Spokane, Washington
- Coordinates: 47°39′25″N 117°25′36″W
- Owner: Spokane Symphony
- Operator: Spokane Symphony
- Capacity: 1,715
- Type: Theatre
- Events: Concerts, movies, theatre
- Public transit: Spokane Transit Authority; Bus: Routes: 6,20,43,60,61,66

Construction
- Opened: September 3, 1931; 95 years ago
- Renovated: November 2007
- Cost: US$1 million (1931); US$31 million (2007)
- Architect: Robert C. Reamer

Tenant
- Spokane Symphony

Website
- www.foxtheaterspokane.com
- Fox Theater
- U.S. National Register of Historic Places
- Built: 1931
- Architect: Robert C. Reamer
- Architectural style: Art Deco
- MPS: Movie Theaters in Washington State MPS
- NRHP reference No.: 01001287
- Added to NRHP: November 30, 2001

The Fox Theater in Spokane, Washington is a 1931 Art Deco movie theater that now serves as a performing arts venue and home of the Spokane Symphony. It was designed by architect Robert C. Reamer, notable for his design of the Old Faithful Inn in Yellowstone National Park. It was part of the Fox Film Corporation empire founded by studio mogul William Fox. The theater opened September 3, 1931, and showed films continuously until it closed September 21, 2000, after an engagement of the movie Gladiator starring Russell Crowe.

== History ==
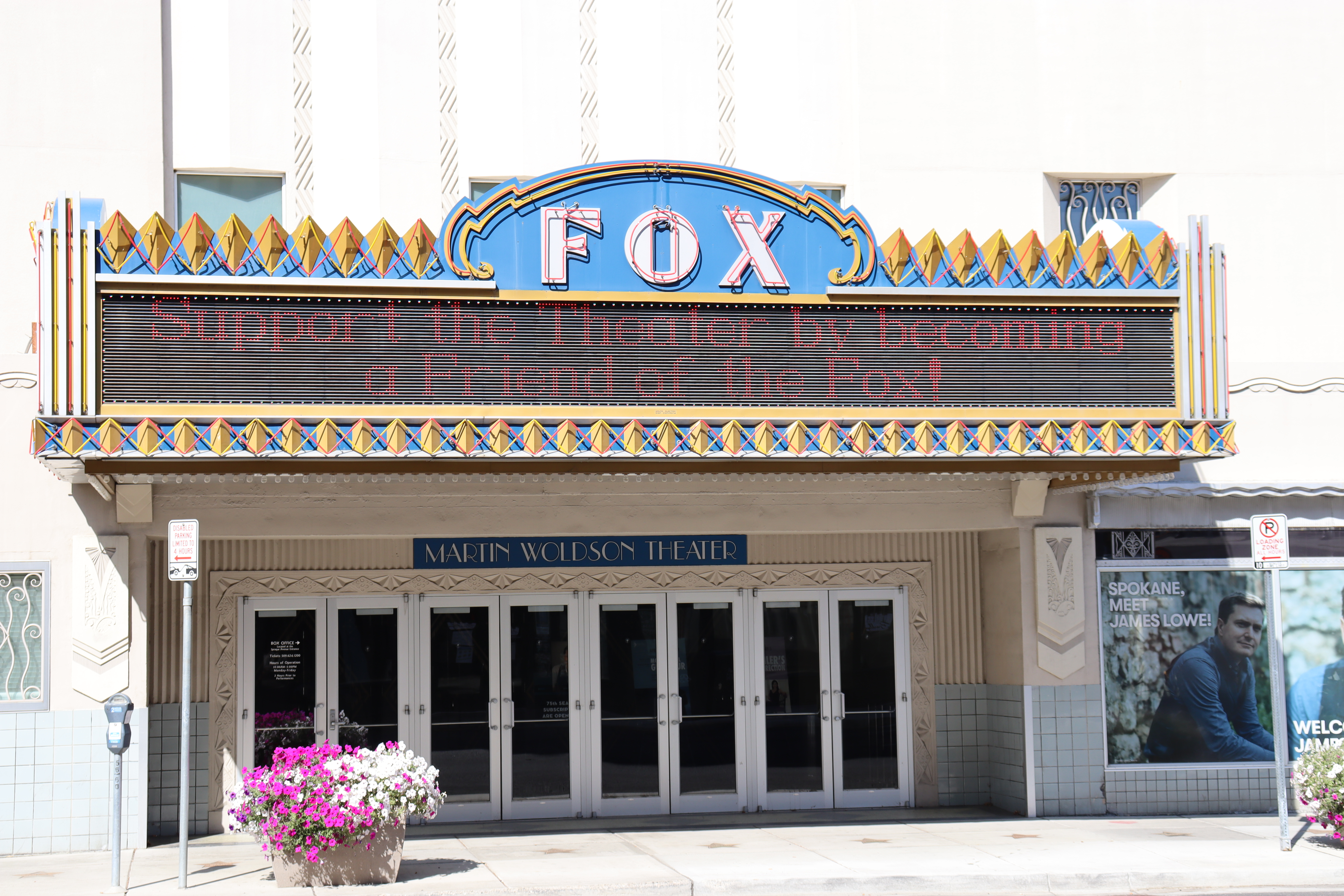
Fox Theater marquee

=== Planning and construction ===
In 1927 rumors began circulating that William Fox's expanding Fox Film Corporation was to build a "million dollar movie palace" in downtown Spokane when an agent of the West Coast Company purchased 2/3 of the city block abutting Sprague Avenue and Monroe Street. The area was already home to a wide variety of theaters at the time but the area lacked a theater from a major motion picture house and distributor.The Spokesman-Review published initial depictions of the proposed atmospheric theater, which was designed in a "Hispano-Italian" architectural style by John Eberson. However, the project was delayed because of the financial difficulties of Fox Film Corporation after the 1929 stock market crash and the company’s subsequent reorganization as Fox West Coast Studios. At the time, no construction had commenced other than cleaning and clearing the work site. The site of the theater was to be on the southeast corner of Sprague Avenue and Monroe Street where Louie Adams' old beer parlor had been located. When Fox took over the companies operations in 1928, he reiterated support for the motion picture project in Spokane in several press releases in 1928 and 1929, including renderings of a new design, but the site remained vacant. Behind the scenes however, Fox West Coast Theater Corporation had set aside funding worth $15 million for new expansion projects and in late 1929 hired Robert Reamer as architect to work on the Spokane project and releasing another rendering of the theater in the Spokesman-Review on January 5, 1930. Reamer's previous theater work included the 5th Avenue Theatre in Seattle and the Mount Baker Theatre in Bellingham, Washington and the design in the newspaper resembled the latter. Reamer is also notable for his design of the Old Faithful Inn in Yellowstone National Park. The Spokane firm, Whitehouse & Price were brought on as associate architects and Los Angeles interior designer, Anthony Heinsbergen was retained to work on the interior of the theater. A final rendering of the new theater was released in the July 1, 1930 edition of the Spokane Daily Chronicle showing a more "modernistic" Art Deco design that was becoming increasingly popular at the time and represented a sharp departure from the revivalist designs shown to the public in all previous press releases.

Construction finally started in early 1930 and employed 200 people; the structures footprint, which included attached retail spaces, occupied the majority of a city block and was constructed using poured concrete. All the exterior façades and trim on the rectangular-shaped building are concrete and were poured and completed in ten days using innovative construction techniques. On the exterior of the building are incised bas-relief ornamentation, with stylized eagles on its Sprague Avenue façade and butterflies fronting Monroe Street. During the Depression Era, a move to the Art Deco style was seen as a more cost effective way to decorate the building by reducing construction costs from expensive plasterwork and fixtures associated with a revivalist architectural style. The budget for the project had been reduced to $750,000, which showed up in the form of a more simple and boxy exterior shell and a lobby with less ornamentation than in the designs shown in the newspaper.

Heinsbergen's decorations and interior appointments were a fusion of the rectangular angles associated with the Art Deco movement and the classical flowing style of Art Nouveau. The Spokane Fox theaters motif is derived from a Hollywood interpretation of art deco, which was a synthesis of the modernist and art nouveau movements of Europe in the late 1800s. Based on the buildings use of geometry, symmetry, style and use of abstract art, the theater is also said to derive influence from the Cubism and Fauvism styles as well as Persian and other exotic architectural styles.

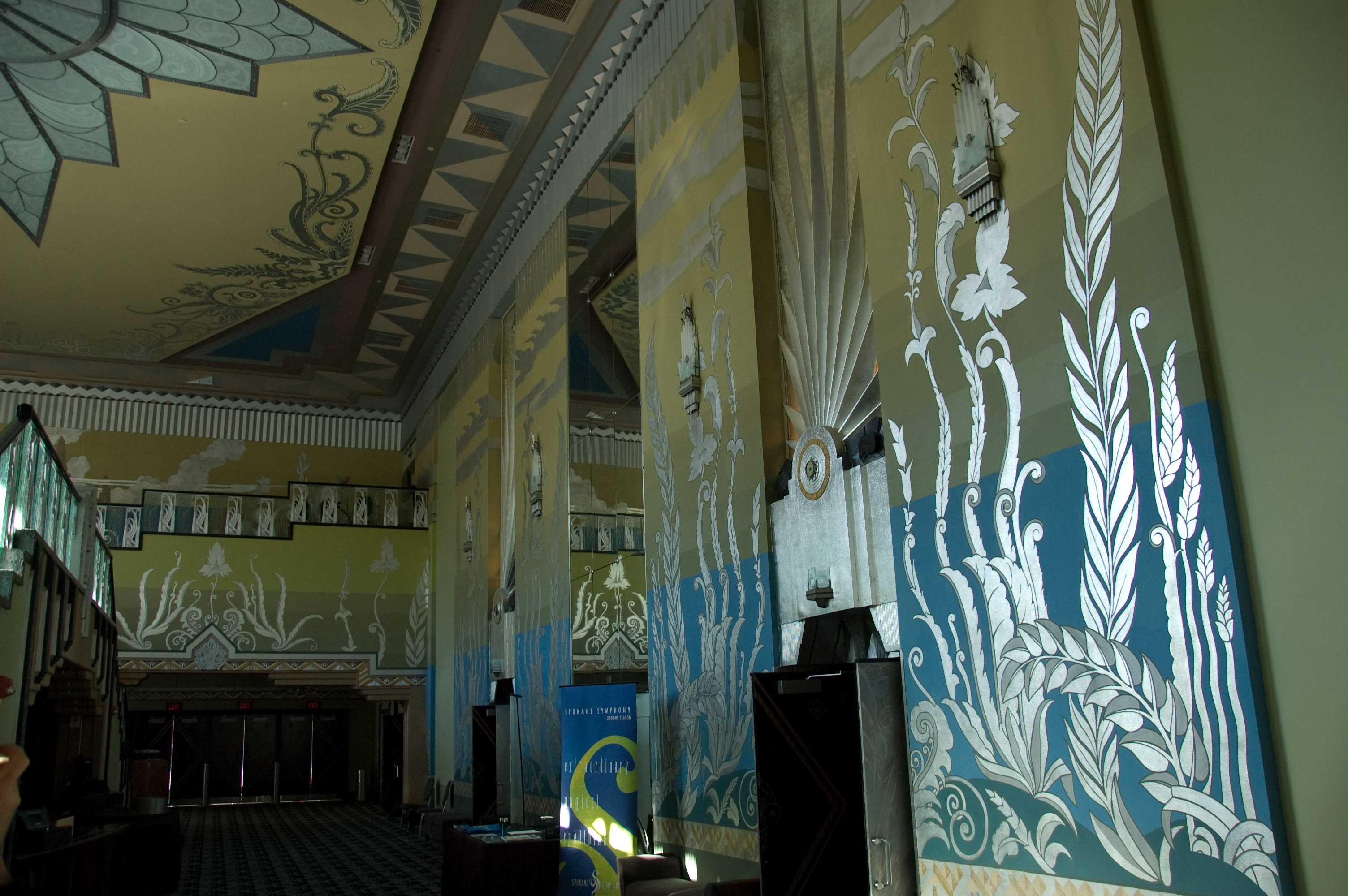
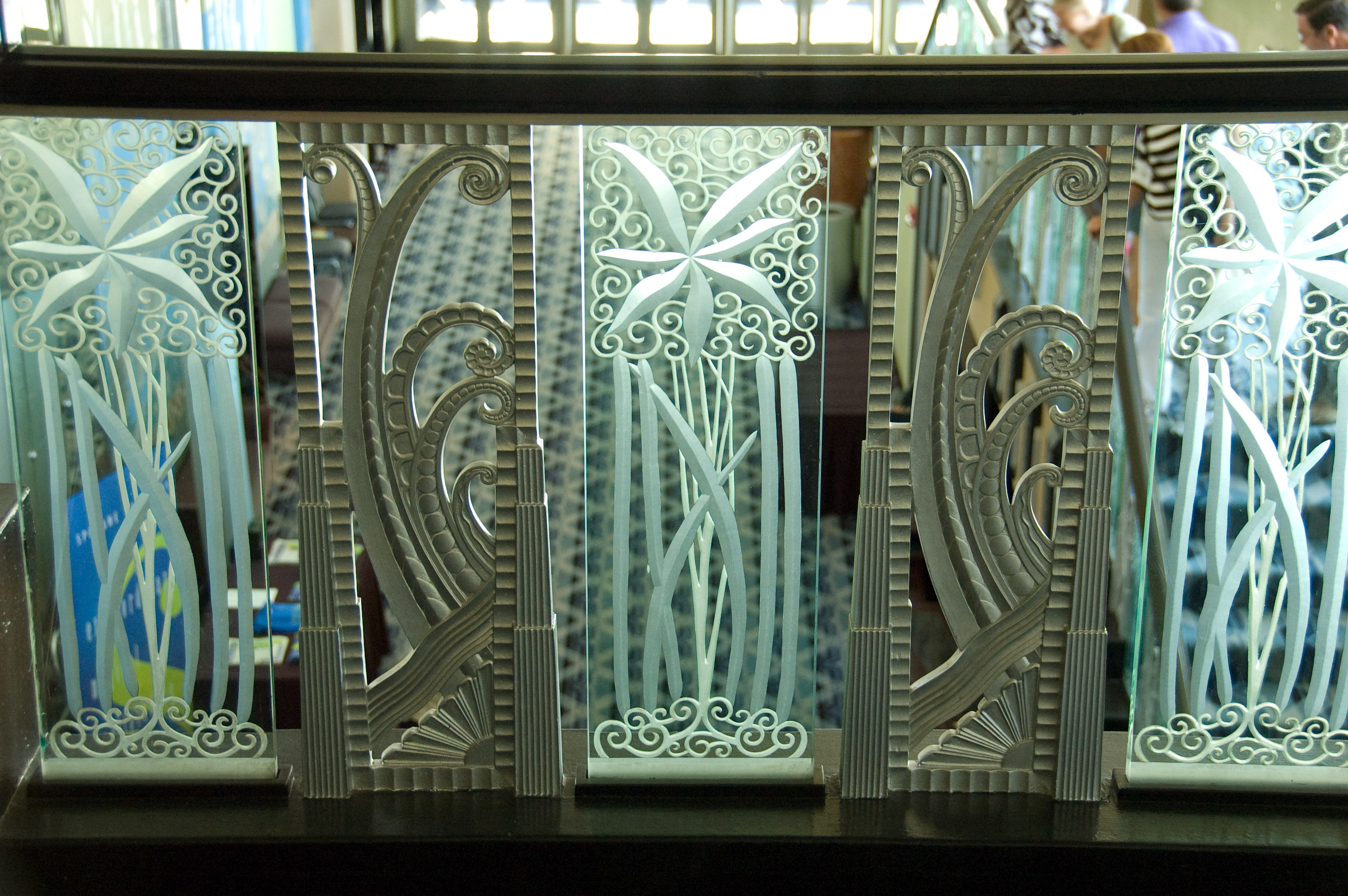
The Grand Lobby and its stairway glass panels are adorned with underwater flora

The carpeting represents the ocean and the first floor and lobby signify an underwater seascape while the second floor and balcony illustrates treetops, and the roof has ornamentation representing celestial bodies. Heinsbergen's work in the theater represents two mural styles, with more elaborate three-dimensional imagery and the more artistic and simplistic two-dimensional designed murals and have been said to evoke children's book illustrations of the time. The centerpiece of the theaters interior was a 60-foot (18 m) wide light fixture made of etched glass and plaster in the shape of a sunburst, it was accompanied by nine smaller chandeliers representing the stars of the universe.

As a movie palace built at the end of the vaudeville and silent film era, it was designed to accommodate live stage acts in addition to movies. The theater was outfitted with a movie screen, a full height proscenium stage, stage house, orchestra pit, and dressing rooms, fly system, and Wurlitzer pipe organ. From the entrance, the theater has two lobbies on opposite ends of the building which lead to ornately decorated hallways that provide access to the auditorium's main floor, halfway down the hallway and opposite to the main floor entrance is an exit to a pair of grand staircases that provides access to the mezzanine and balcony levels.

The buildings cost of construction was popularly publicized as being US$1,000,000 (equivalent to $21,200,000 in 2025), with actual cost estimates at the projects completion being placed at US$350,000 (equivalent to $7,400,000 in 2025) for the land, US$400,000 (equivalent to $8,500,000 in 2025) for construction, and US$200,000 (equivalent to $4,200,000 in 2025) for equipment and furnishings. Upon completion, executives at Fox told reporters the theater as the most artistic and modern theater in the Fox Theater chain.

=== Grand opening and first decades ===
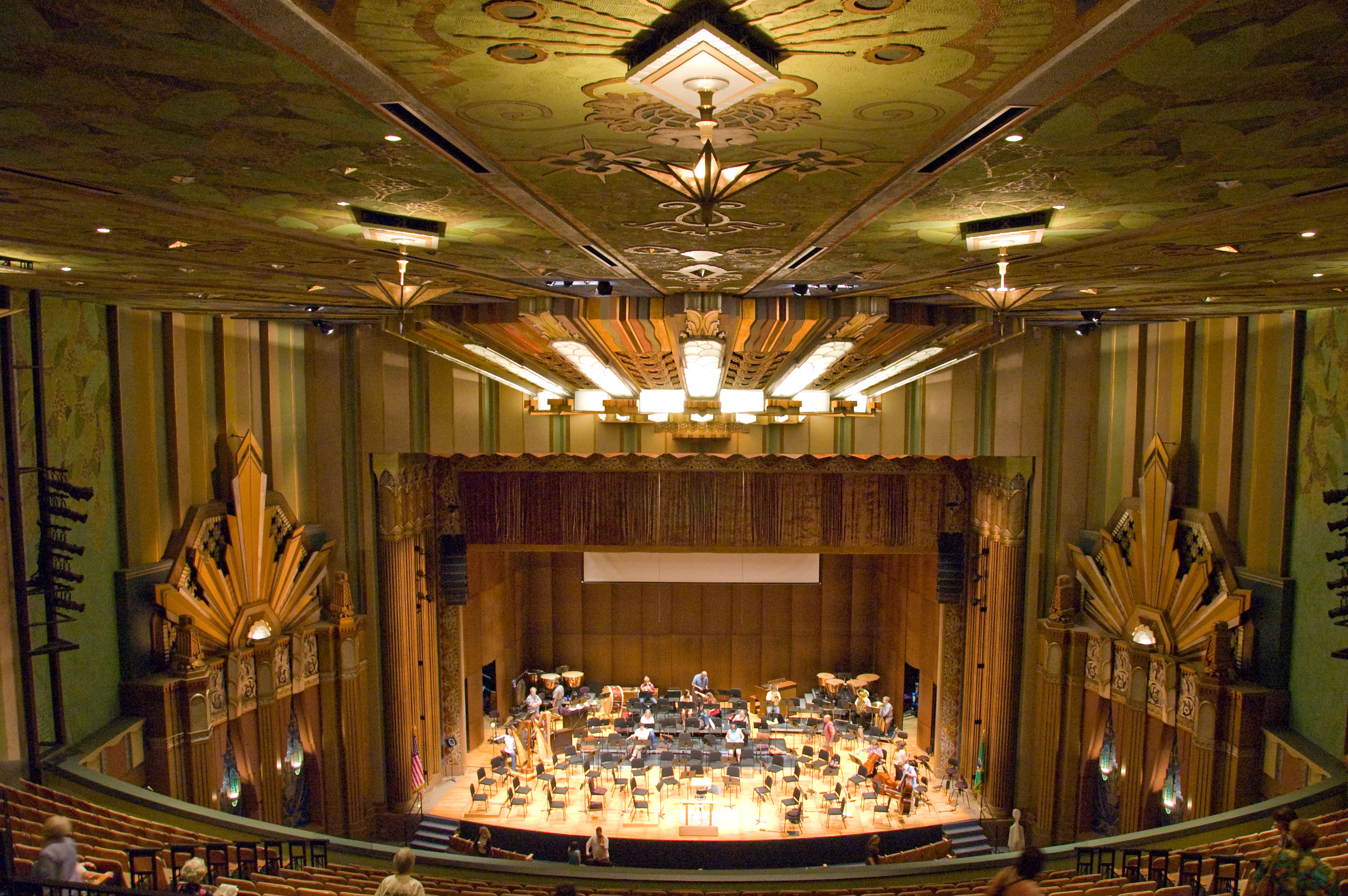
Restored art deco interior designed by Anthony Heinsbergen

The Fox Theater opened with seating for 2,350 patrons (1,450 on the ground floor and 900 in the balcony) on September 3, 1931. Anita Page, Mitzi Green, George O'Brien, Victor McLaglen and El Brendel attended the opening performance gala. A crowd of onlookers estimated to be as much as 20,000 people crowded the streets outside the theater to see a free of charge outside show and catch a glimpse of the celebrities in attendance as they were escorted from the Davenport Hotel. The public was surprised at the sight of the buildings sleek modern art deco exterior, which was in stark contrast to the Italianate renderings that were shown in the Spokesman-Review in years prior. The interior decorations were singled out for praise in contemporary newspaper accounts. Wilbur Hindley at the Spokesman-Review commented that the design was "so unusual, so bizarre and so futuristic that the casual passerby catches his breath in surprise and wonder;" the design utilized aluminum and glass as opposed to the traditional marble and wood in the interior décor, which included embellishments like hand painted murals of undersea plants and etched glass light panels.

The Fox opened with a live production of Fanchon and Marco's About Town variety show followed by the film Merely Mary Ann. Ticket holders also got to see acts by Laurel and Hardy and a performance by the Fox Theater Orchestra. This mix of alternating traditional vaudeville style live entertainment and trendy Hollywood talkies was part of the theaters initial long-term business strategy and reflected the evolving tastes of the public. Movies had become a low cost escape from the challenges of the Great Depression. The variety shows were phased out after a couple years owing to the public favoring movies over stage productions, but the Fox continued to show live performances as it remained the primary performing arts venue in Spokane for its first few decades.

The theater began hosting its long running "Community Concerts" performances in 1934 which would bring in nationally touring musicians to the Fox and in 1935 it staged a performance by the Hoboken Four which included Frank Sinatra. In 1937, one of Spokane's most famous residents, Bing Crosby hosted a national talent show at the Fox.

In film, the theater showed Disney's box-office record breaking film Snow White and the Seven Dwarfs, setting a 7-day attendance record with 40,000 admissions in 1938; which was quickly outdone in 1939 by Gone with the Wind, which would stand until 1943 when a showing of the musical This Is the Army surpassed it.

=== Multiplex and decline ===
The theater added a bigger screen, 3-D effects, and a CinemaScope projector in 1953, then showing its first 3-D film, Bwana Devil later that year.

The Wurlitzer 3-manual, 13-rank theatre organ installed when the building was constructed in 1931 was removed in 1961. In May of that year, the Fox Theater sold it to a Los Angeles-area collector, who disassembled it and had it shipped to California, the process of dismantling the organ took approximately one week. Starting in 1968, the theater began to augment its motion picture programming with live performances by the Spokane Symphony, which became a tenant in the building until 1974 when they moved to the newly built Spokane Opera House. A new sound shell was installed for the symphony. Not long after in 1969, the theater discontinued its long running Community Concerts series that it had hosted since 1934 that had brought in many big names over the years such as Vladimir Horowitz, Yehudi Menuhin, Marian Anderson, Arthur Rubinstein, Rudolf Serkin, Jascha Heifetz, Glenn Gould, Isaac Stern, and Leontyne Price. The Fox Theater subdivided its main screen and opened as a three-screen complex (with one main screen downstairs and two balcony screens upstairs) on 14 November 1975. In 1989, the theater began showing second-run movies at US$1 (equivalent to $3 in 2025) per ticket. Nine chandeliers were removed from the ceiling to accommodate the change.

When Regal Cinemas built the new 12-screen megaplex at NorthTown Mall, it sold half of its eight Spokane theaters, including the Fox. The final movie, a screening of Gladiator, was shown on September 21, 2000, and a small ceremony before the showing marked the sale of the theater to the Spokane Symphony, where representatives of Regal Cinemas and the Spokane Symphony exchanged a symbolic $1.3 million check for the keys to the theater.

Michelle Obama, wife of the 2008 Democratic presidential nominee Barack Obama held a rally campaigning for her husband's presidential campaign on February 8, 2008.

=== Fundraising and restoration ===
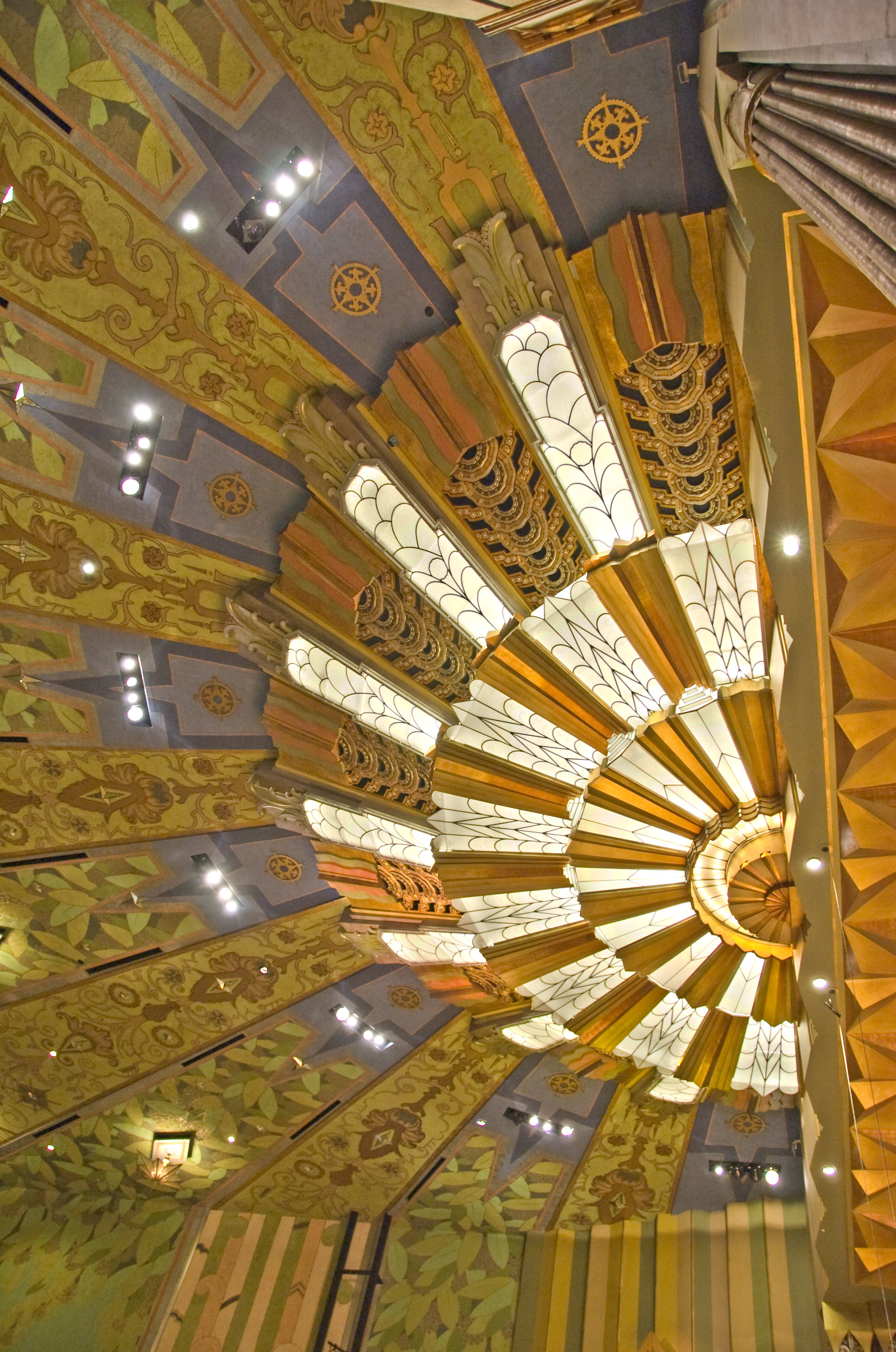
The centerpiece 350-light and 60-foot-wide sunburst chandelier above the stage

The adjacent Spokane Club sought to purchase and demolish the building to build a parking garage. Although the club had entered into negotiations with the then-owners, Regal Cinemas, they had not signed a contract and the Club dropped its plans to purchase the theater and supported the Spokane Symphony's bid when they learned they were interested in the site for a concert hall. The theater was saved when the Spokane Symphony signed a contract to purchase it for US$1.1 million in June 2000. Once the Symphony determined whether the renovations were feasible and the funds could be raised, it began an extensive "Save the Fox" fund raising campaign to raise the budget needed for restoration. Myrtle Woldson gifted the campaign $1 million and then followed that up with a challenge to match a $2 million donation. About a quarter of the restoration funds were raised from federal and state sources, $8 million from various programs including a Save America's Treasures grant and $2.5 million allocated from the Washington state legislature. Prominent architectural features were renamed in honor of significant donors. The theater dedicates a "Walk of Stars" along Sprague Avenue and Monroe Street to acknowledge the donations and contributions of those who support the theater and symphony. The theater was placed on the National Register of Historic Places on November 30, 2001.

The restoration designer was NAC Architecture of Spokane and the contractor on the project was Walker Construction of Spokane. Restorers catalogued, cleaned, painted, and re-created lost architectural details and lighting fixtures. Some external building modifications were made during the renovation. A donation of vacant land by the Cowles family allowed the stage area to be enlarged on the west side of the theater and a new concrete bulwark was erected there and a refabricated vertical marquee was created to sit atop the building. The original proscenium stage was converted to a thrust stage.

Internally, partitions that were installed in 1975 which converted the theater into a multiplex were removed and the creation of an inner lobby reduced the seating from 2,350 to 1,727 and a hole had to be cut into the building's south face to allow the installation of new steel structural beams into the attic to support the equipment required for modern amenities. Restoration specialists from EverGreene Architectural Arts were brought on to restore Heinsbergen's interior designs as well as the sunburst and chandelier light fixtures. Upgrades to the theater included installing heating and air conditioning systems and soundproofing the venue to make the acoustics suitable for a symphony. The buildings original glass work was cleaned and some replicated using relearned techniques; the metal framework in the leaded glass in the building was replaced using a shiny and reflective zinc to maintain an art deco aesthetic.

The total cost of the renovations was $31 million and it was completed in November 2007. The project later received a national preservation award in 2010 by the National Trust for Historic Preservation.

The theater was renamed the Martin Woldson Theater at the Fox in honor of Myrtle Woldson's railroad pioneer father, who contributed $3 million towards the renovations.

It re-opened as the home of the Spokane Symphony on November 17, 2007, presided over by Washington Governor Christine Gregoire. The re-opening included a special celebration featuring a performance by Tony Bennett on November 19, 2007. The meticulous restoration was documented in the KSPS-TV film "Spokane's 21st Century Fox".
