= Spokane City Lines =

Defunct mass transit in Spokane, Washington, United States

Spokane City Lines (SCL) was a mass transit company that operated in Spokane, Washington, United States, from 1945 until 1972. It took over an existing system descended from earlier streetcars. SCL was purchased by the Spokane city government and became a public agency—the predecessor to the modern-day Spokane Transit Authority.

== History ==
In June 1945, the sale of Spokane United Railways was announced. As a subsidiary of Washington Water Power, the transit operation would be sold to Pacific City Lines for $850,000 and operate as a new company to be known as Spokane City Lines. Several days later, articles of incorporation were filed for the new transit company. Following state approval, the new company began operations on July 7, 1945.

Transit ridership in Spokane grew rapidly during World War II. Spokane City Lines introduced route numbering, a concept used in other systems, when it took over from Spokane UNited Railways. The company also ordered new diesel coaches, and went about adding benches at select bus stops, printing schedules, extending some routes and offering local tours by bus. Spokane City Lines served 26,175,210 passengers in 1946, its first full calendar year of service, according to the company's annual report submitted to the Washington State Public Service Commission.

In January 1968, transit workers with Spokane City Lines went on strike after a settlement on wages broke down. Following a successful ballot proposition to impose a household tax to funding public transportation, Spokane City Line was selected to operate the newly created Spokane Transit System on behalf of the City of Spokane. The City of Spokane later purchased the assets of Spokane City Lines in 1972 for $892,110, using a combination of federal and state funds.
