= Spokane Transit Authority =

Public transit authority

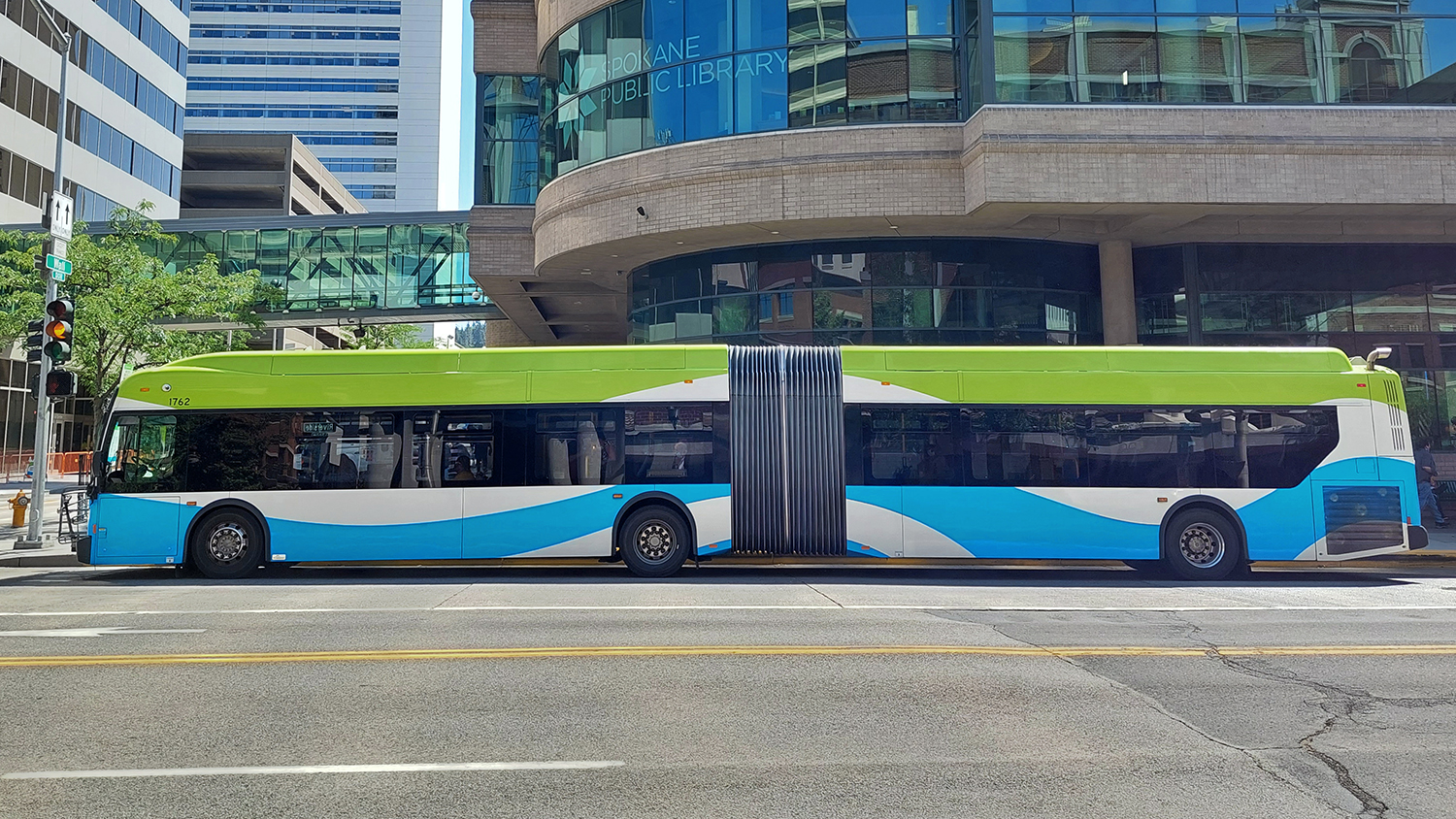
- A 60-foot New Flyer Xcelsior articulated bus at the STA Plaza in July 2021
- Founded: March 10, 1981
- Headquarters: 1230 W. Boone Avenue; Spokane, Washington
- Locale: Spokane County, Washington, U.S.
- Service area: 248 square miles (642 km^{2})
- Service type: Bus, paratransit, vanpool, microtransit
- Routes: 51
- Fleet: 194 buses, 134 paratransit vans, 125 vanpool vehicles
- Daily ridership: 35,069 (weekdays, September 2024)
- Annual ridership: 10,940,666 (2025)
- Fuel type: Diesel, hybrid electric, and battery electric
- Chief executive: Karl Otterstrom
- Website: spokanetransit.com

Spokane Transit Authority, more commonly Spokane Transit or STA, is the public transit operator of central Spokane County, Washington, United States. STA provides public transportation within the Spokane County Public Transportation Benefit Area (PTBA), which spans 248 square miles (640 km^{2}) and includes the cities of Spokane, Spokane Valley, Liberty Lake, Cheney, Airway Heights, Medical Lake, Millwood, and unincorporated areas between and around those cities. Originally conceived in 1980, and authorized by voters on March 10, 1981, STA traces its origins to multiple private transit operators serving Spokane as early as 1888.

In 2025, the system had a ridership of 10,941,700, or about 38,100 per weekday as of the second quarter of 2026. STA serves are primarily oriented within the Spokane urbanized area, one of 147 medium-sized urbanized areas with a population between 200,000 and 1,000,000 as of the 2020 US Census. Among these medium-sized urbanized areas and based on 2024 ridership data, the Spokane urbanized area ranks 45th in population (447,279), 12th in total transit ridership (10,225,648), and 10th in transit ridership per capita (22.86).

== History ==
=== 1880s–1970s: Predecessors ===
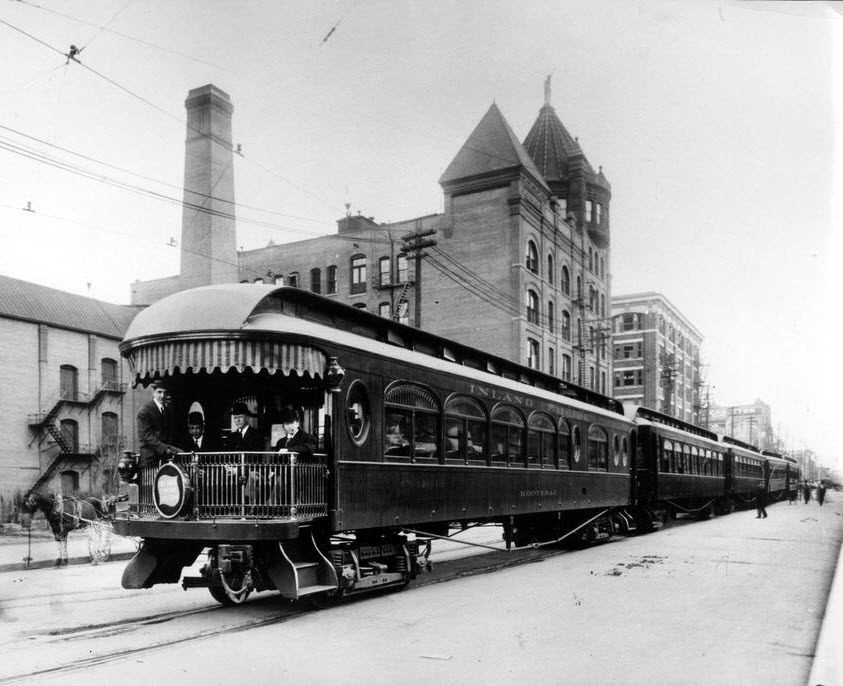
An interurban railcar on the Spokane and Inland Empire Railroad, 1912

The first transit system in the Spokane area was a horse-drawn streetcar that opened in April 1888 between downtown Spokane and the Browne's Addition neighborhood. The first electric streetcar began operations November 1889 and traveled between downtown Spokane through what is now the University District. Over the next several decades, multiple private interests constructed and operated streetcars and cable cars typically as an integral part of a real estate development plan. By 1896, the leading streetcar system was the Spokane Street Railway Company, with 23 miles of railway. Its network of lines was described as a "cartwheel" that emanated from a "hub" at the intersection of Riverside Avenue and Howard Street in downtown Spokane.

By 1910, streetcar lines were owned and operated by two competing companies: Washington Water Power and Spokane Traction Company. In addition to urban street railways, each company had interests in electric Interurban lines that stretched as far away as Moscow, Idaho. In that year, streetcar and interurban ridership peaked at 37.98 million rides.

The decade following 1910 was a time of intense competition for the streetcars, with growing automobile ownership and private jitneys that threatened the viability of a divided transit system. By the end of the decade, Spokane Traction Company fell into receivership and underwent reorganizations that were unsuccessful in returning the system to profitability. On May 2, 1922, Spokane citizens overwhelmingly voted to amend the city charter to reduce taxes and other special assessments imposed on streetcar operations and infrastructure, enabling the formation of a unified streetcar system featuring "universal transfers" between lines and empowering the company to convert some lines to trolleybuses on its own discretion. Following the successful measure, the Spokane United Railways Company was formed as a subsidiary to Washington Water Power (now Avista) to create a unified electric streetcar system.

The street railway system was gradually phased out through the 1930s to make way for motorized coaches. The final streetcar ran on August 31, 1936, between downtown and Natatorium Park, where the vehicle was set alight in a pyre. Bus ridership reached a peak in the Spokane area in 1946 with 26 million passengers. The system was purchased by Spokane City Lines Company (part of National City Lines) in 1945, and later turned over to the City of Spokane in 1968. Upon acquisition by the city, funding for the system was derived from a $1 household tax.

=== 1980s: Reorganization into regional system ===
In 1980, a municipal corporation was created to administer mass transit services for a new public transportation benefit area (PTBA). The new PTBA, officially named the Spokane Transit Authority for Regional Transportation, represented a shift in funding and operational model of Spokane Transit System from a city model to a regional model. Due to rapid inflation in the late 1970s and early 1980s, the flat $1 city tax on households that had funded Spokane Transit System was no longer keeping up with the rising costs of its era. The household tax model had another major disadvantage; because the tax depended on the quantity of households within the tax boundaries, its revenues would only increase with the construction of new households. Meanwhile, most residential growth was occurring outside Spokane city limits. Furthermore, the flat tax on households had been viewed by some as a very regressive tax.

An election was held on March 10, 1981, to determine the future of public transportation in the Spokane region. The election measure, which passed and was subsequently implemented the following month of April 1981, replaced the $1 tax on households within Spokane city limits with a 0.3% sales tax to be applied throughout the public transportation benefit area. The shift in the transit agency's funding and administrative model was not isolated to Spokane. Many other cities and regions in Washington state including the cities of Vancouver and Tacoma, as well as King County, Pierce County, Snohomish County, and Clark County had already shifted from a city household tax model to a county-wide transit system funded by sales tax. In addition to adapting its funding model to reflect the current economic times, the shift to a regional model allowed the transit agency to heavily increase bus service to areas beyond Spokane city limits. Prior to the election, service outside city limits was limited, since no tax subsidies were collected outside the city limits.

The restructured system operated under three branches; Spokane Transit Authority for Regional Transportation (START) was the administrative body, the Spokane Transit System (STS) name remained for the fixed route bus operation, and Spokane Area Special Transportation Agency (SASTA) operated the paratransit services. The three names were unified about one and half years later in September 1982 under the Spokane Transit Authority name and brand. The name change officially took effect on September 23, 1982, after the START Board passed a resolution renaming the municipal corporation to Spokane Transit Authority.

In September 1989, Spokane Transit opened the Valley Transit Center, an off-street passenger facility located on 4th Avenue at University Road in Spokane Valley, featuring a large passenger island with covered seating. The facility included a park and ride lot among other amenities.

=== 1990s ===
At the urging of the downtown business community, Spokane Transit developed plans for a permanent transit center to replace the existing Howard and Riverside hub, which required that buses park along many downtown streets for passengers to make transfers. The streetside stops were criticized by passengers for their lack of amenities and by business owners for blocking access. The transit center, known as The Plaza, opened on July 16, 1995, and constructed as an indoor urban park alongside its 10 outdoor bus bays. It cost approximately $20.6 million to construct—above the projected $12 million budget—and was criticized for its use of Italian porcelain tiles, bamboo and ficus trees, and other features that were described as "extravagant".

In September 1998, Spokane Transit implemented a major revision of the bus network, the largest change to the bus network in 17 years. Routes were consolidated to provide more frequency on busy corridors and all route numbers were revised, primarily according to geography.

=== 2000s: Financial changes and light rail study ===
In addition to the local sales tax, a major revenue source was the state's motor vehicle excise tax which provided matching funds that totaled 40 percent of the STA budget. After statewide Initiative 695 was passed in 1999, the legislature eliminated the matching funds even though the initiative was later found unconstitutional. STA cut 10 percent of its service in 2000 and began to use its reserve funding to maintain their existing schedules. As its undesignated cash reserves balance fell, Spokane Transit attempted to increase its tax authority from 0.3% to 0.6% in September 2002, but it was rejected by voters 48.2% for to 51.8% against. Research following the failed ballot measure pointed to limited understanding of the agency's organizational structure, performance and financial conditions.

Spokane Transit created task force to study changes that could be made to regain the support of the community, while simultaneously preparing for a potential 40 percent service decrease. After increased public participation, and 69% voter approval, Spokane Transit increased the sales tax from 0.3% to 0.6% in October 2004, subject to a sunset of the tax in 2009. In May 2008, voters reauthorized the additional 0.3% sales tax with no sunset clause, with 65 percent in favor.

SRTC and STA jointly created the Light Rail Steering Committee (LRSC) in 2000 to study a light rail system that would run east–west across the metropolitan area from Spokane to Liberty Lake. The committee published a draft environmental impact statement (DEIS) in 2006 which evaluated several rail and bus alternatives for the corridor. The committee stated preference for a single-track rail corridor using diesel multiple units (DMU) that would cost less than half the conventional light rail system. The travel demand modeling performed as part of the DEIS forecast less than 3,500 daily boardings on the 15.5-mile (24.9 km), 14-station system in 2025. An advisory vote in November 2006 elicited a negative response to continued planning and investment in the light rail project, which was estimated to cost $263 million to construct. A month later, the steering committee was disbanded by STA.

In 2005, E. Susan Meyer took lead as CEO of the agency. In 2008, transit consultants Nelson-Nygaard Associates recommended changes to transit operations downtown while retaining the use of the Plaza transfer facility.

=== 2010s ===
Spokane Transit adopted a new comprehensive plan, Connect Spokane, in June 2010, to guide system planning and growth. The plan calls for a network of high performance transit with frequent service connecting key neighborhoods and activity centers throughout the region. In response to a significant decline in sales tax revenue resulting from the Great Recession, Spokane Transit undertook service reductions in 2010 and 2011. Despite the cuts, ridership increased, reaching an all-time high for Spokane Transit Authority in 2014, with 11.3 million passengers on its fixed route system.

In November 2016, voters approved an increase in the sale tax dedicated to public transit to implement the STA Moving Forward plan. The plan called for more and better service, new connection facilities, include new transit centers and stations, and investments in six high performance transit lines. In 2018, Spokane Transit opened the West Plains Transit Center, a new facility near Medical Lake which had been funded in the STA Moving Forward plan. The transit center allows passengers between the cities of Cheney, Medical Lake, and Airway Heights to travel between those cities without transferring in Spokane. As part of the 2018 changes, STA also increased frequency on service to the West Central neighborhood, introduced larger buses on North Division Street and introduced a new express route to the Valley Transit Center.

=== 2020s ===
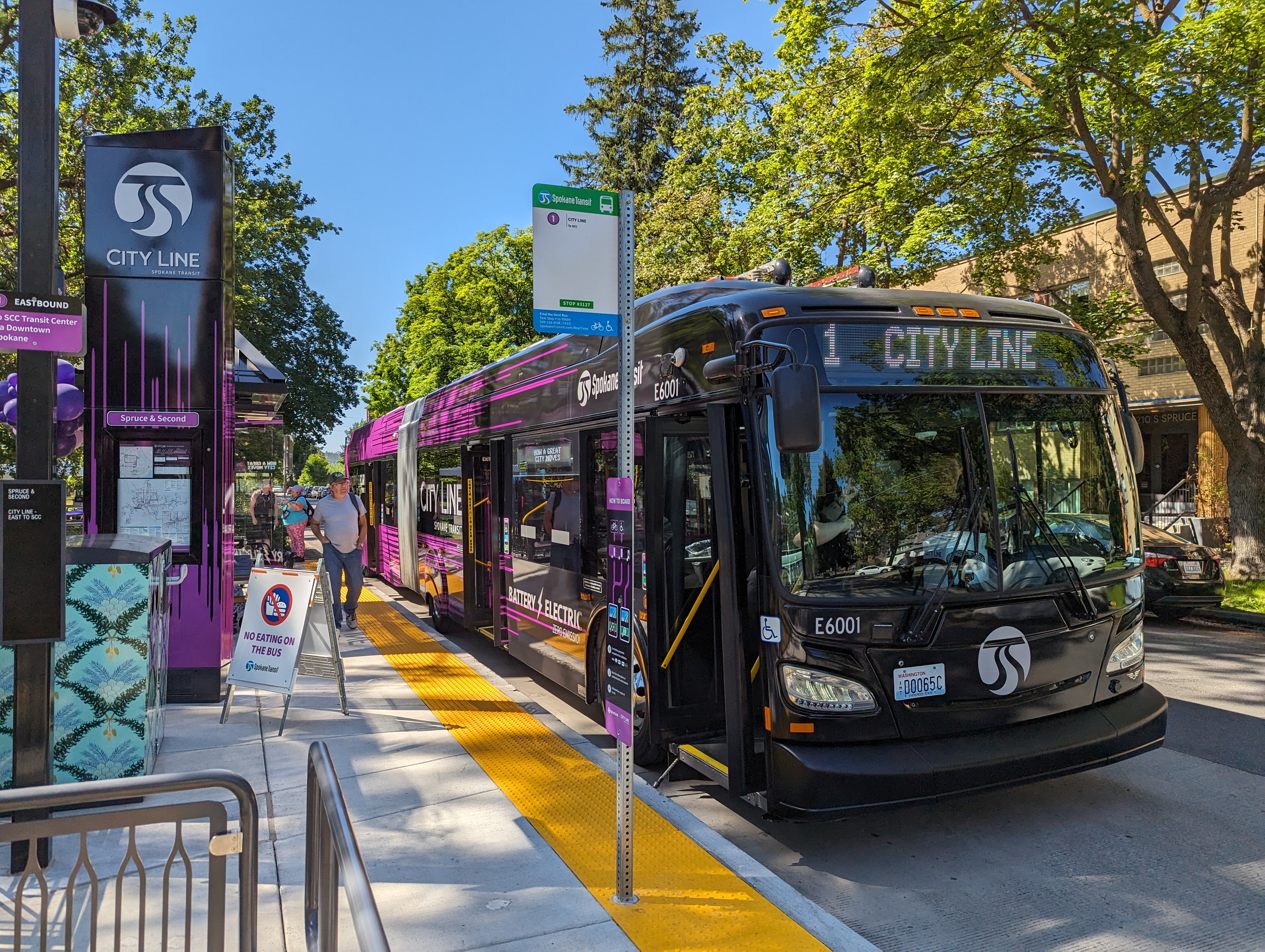
A City Line bus rapid transit bus on opening day (July 15, 2023)

Like public transport agencies across the globe, STA was significantly impacted by the COVID-19 pandemic. Fixed route ridership dropped from 9.97 million passenger boardings in 2019 to 5.24 million passenger boardings in 2021. STA's ridership began to recover in 2022, with May 2022 experiencing a year-over-year increase of 29.6% on fixed route, 38.7% on Paratransit and 37.0% increase on Vanpool. In October 2022, STA launched a new fare collection system which allows for mobile payments in addition to previous payment methods, as well as introduced fare capping.

On July 15, 2023, STA launched City Line, the first bus rapid transit line in the Spokane area. It travels east–west across 6 miles (9.7 km) of Downtown Spokane and nearby neighborhoods using a mix of median and curbside stations. The project cost $82 million to construct and was completed $10 million under budget. The City Line runs every 7.5 minutes during peak periods on weekdays and every 10 to 15 minutes at other times. The route carried 756,231 total passenger trips in 2024.

The agency's seven double-decker buses, which carry up to 108 passengers, entered service in September 2025 on the Spokane–Cheney express routes after several months of testing and training. The buses were pulled from service after a collision with a low-clearance railroad bridge in Downtown Spokane on January 18, 2026, which caused seven passengers to be injured. The double-decker bus fleet resumed service on February 21 of that year; as of late February 2026 the bus involved in the collision is out of service until it can be repaired.

On August 4, 2026, area voters approved the renewal of a 0.2% sales tax dedicated to public transportation, originally authorized in November 2016. The renewal extends to December 31, 2048, and enables the agency to maintain and enhance service, and advance the goals and initiatives of its strategic plan, STA Connect 2035.

== Services ==
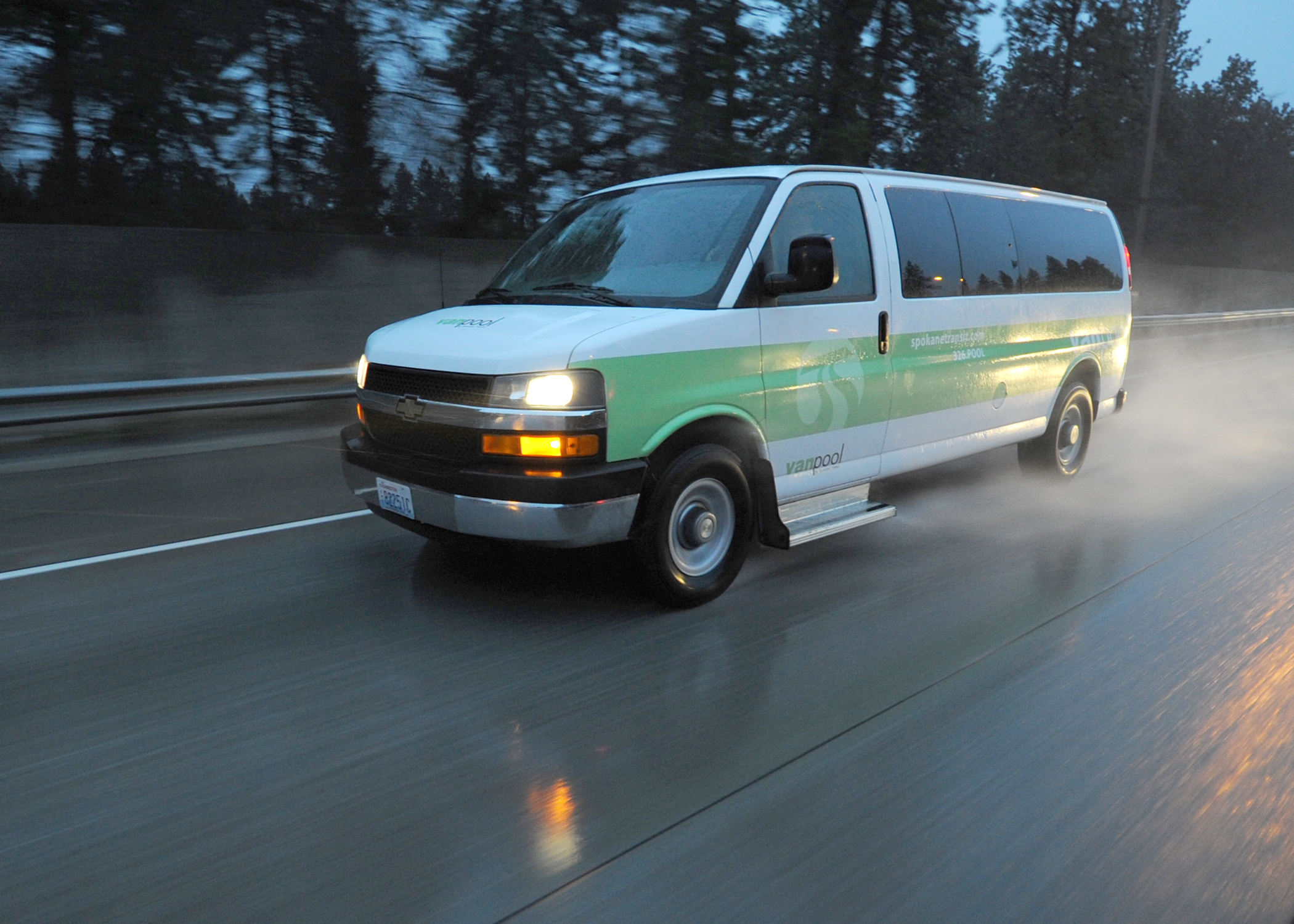
An STA Vanpool vehicle, prior to rebranding as Rideshare

Spokane Transit has 51 bus routes in its fixed route network that serve its service area on published schedules. Most routes run 365 days a year; the service day is generally 5:30 a.m. to 11:30 p.m. on weekdays, 6 a.m. to 11:30 p.m. on Saturdays, and 6 a.m. to 10 p.m. on Sundays and holidays. Additionally, STA operates routes during major community events such as the Lilac Bloomsday Run, Hoopfest, Skyfest, and the Spokane County Fair & Expo. The agency has paratransit service in areas within 3/4 mile (1 km) of every fixed route to passengers with disabilities per the Americans with Disabilities Act of 1990. STA's vanpool system, Rideshare, provides shared vehicles for passengers traveling between common destinations at a fixed rate per month. The system allows for door-to-door service as well as stops as park-and-ride lots or other meeting points. The agency makes changes to its service during three annual periods in January, May, and September.

STA has six High Performance Transit corridors that were designated by the agency for increased investment in service—every 15 minutes on weekdays for local corridors and every 30 minutes on regional corridors. The network was formed in 2010 under a preliminary plan that earmarked 14 corridors for all-day frequent transit system that would be primarily buses but could also include bus rapid transit and other modes. The plan was a response to the unsuccessful planning effort in the 2000s for a light rail line that would serve the Spokane area. The High Performance Transit program includes funding to increase bus frequency on its constituent routes as well as construct enhanced bus stops with shelters, real-time arrivals information, and other amenities. One of the priority corridors extended east from Spokane along Interstate 90 to Coeur d'Alene, Idaho.

=== Fixed routes ===
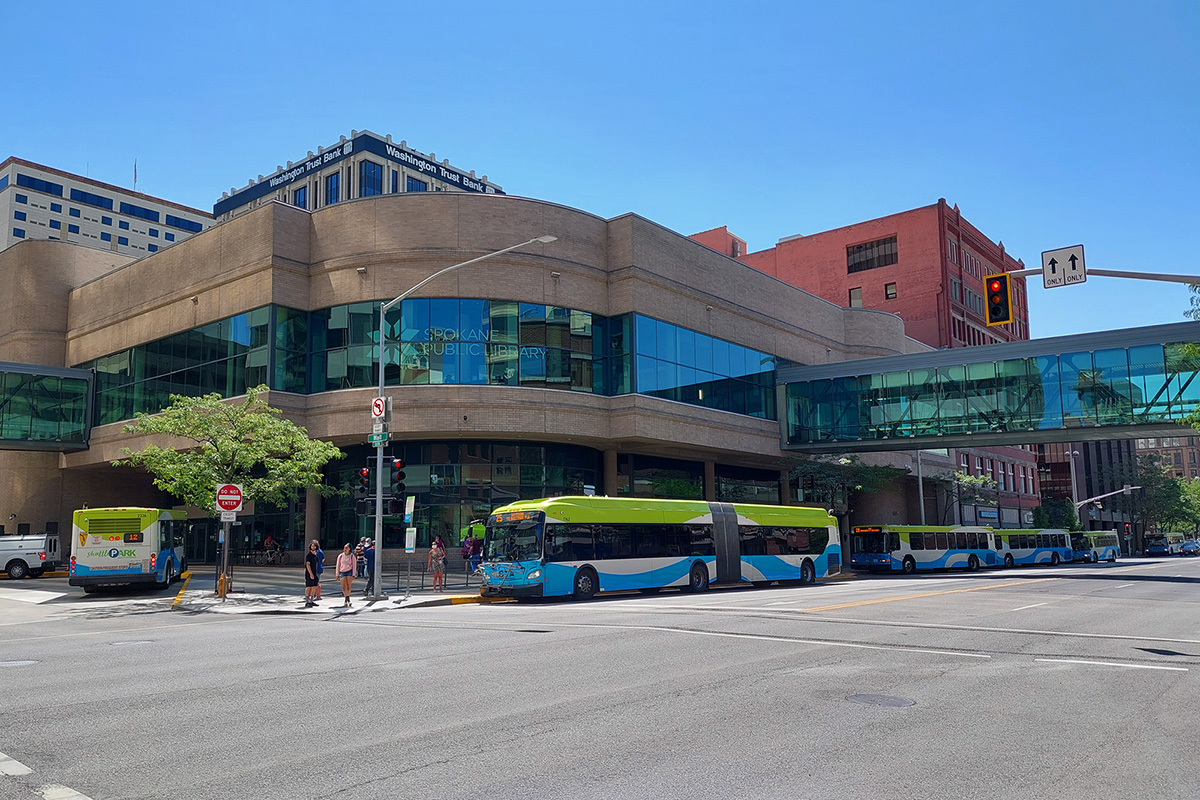
Most of Spokane Transit's bus routes run through The Plaza in Downtown Spokane.

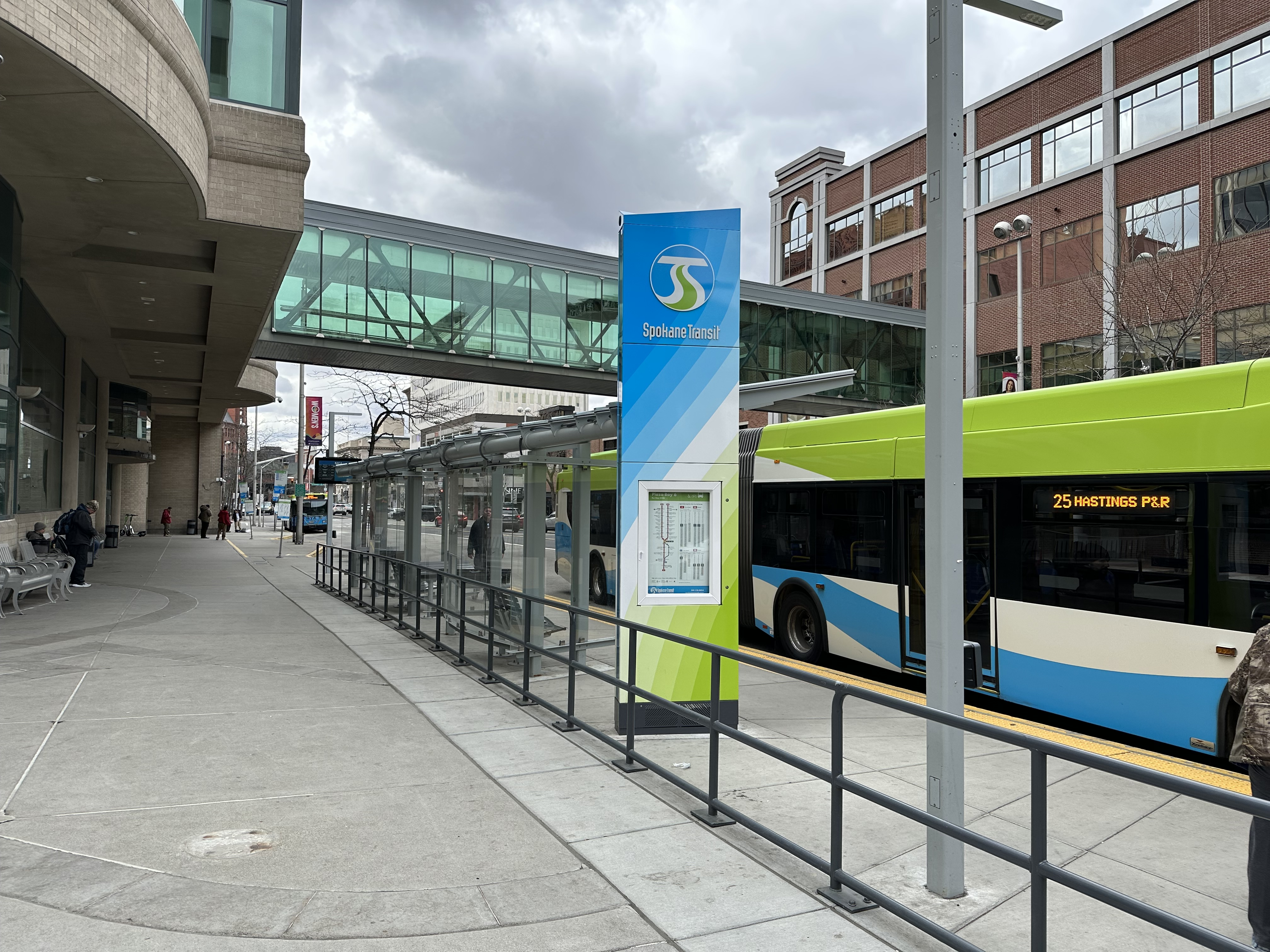
High-performance transit station at Plaza Bay 6. The stop includes STA branding, real-time bus information, glass shelter, lighting, and seating.

Fixed routes are divided into several service levels by their number and color used for route signage at stops and on schedules and maps. The City Line has the highest frequency in the system, with buses every 7–8 minutes during peak periods, every 10 minutes midday on weekdays, and every 15 minutes during the day on weekends. Frequent local routes typically have trips every 15 minutes during most of the weekday and every 30 or 60 minutes on weekends. Other local routes have a base frequency of every 30 minutes on weekdays and 60 minutes on weekends, while shuttle routes in Downtown Spokane run every 10 to 20 minutes.

STA also has regional express routes that use Interstate 90 for most of their trips an run every 30 minutes from Monday to Saturday and every 60 minutes on Sundays. Several peak-only express routes originate in Downtown Spokane or at the Eastern Washington University campus and serve suburban park-and-rides and other stops. Most national holidays operate on a Saturday schedule with New Year's Day, Thanksgiving, and Christmas Day operating on a Sunday schedule.

=== Bus rapid transit ===
Spokane Transit operates one bus rapid transit line and has plans to add several corridors as part of its High Performance Transit network. The first, the City Line, began service on July 15, 2023, with 21 stations in Browne's Addition, Downtown Spokane, and the University District. It is 6 miles (9.7 km) and uses a fleet of dedicated battery electric buses. The corridor had been studied for major investment from 2010 to 2011, which resulted in a locally preferred alternative of an electric trolleybus with some bus rapid transit features along an east–west route. The electric trolleybuses were replaced in later planning by battery electric buses, while bus rapid transit features such as transit signal priority were added.

The Division Bus Rapid Transit project plans to construct a north–south bus rapid transit line from Downtown Spokane to Mead. In March 2022, the Washington State Legislature passed a 16-year transportation program that earmarked $50 million to the project. The Federal Transit Administration gave the project medium-high rating under its capital investment grant (CIG) program, and $82 million in federal funds were allocated to the program in 2026. The Division BRT line is planned to open in 2030 with 40 stations and span 9 miles (14 km) of Division Street once the North Spokane Corridor freeway is completed.

== Passenger facilities and amenities ==
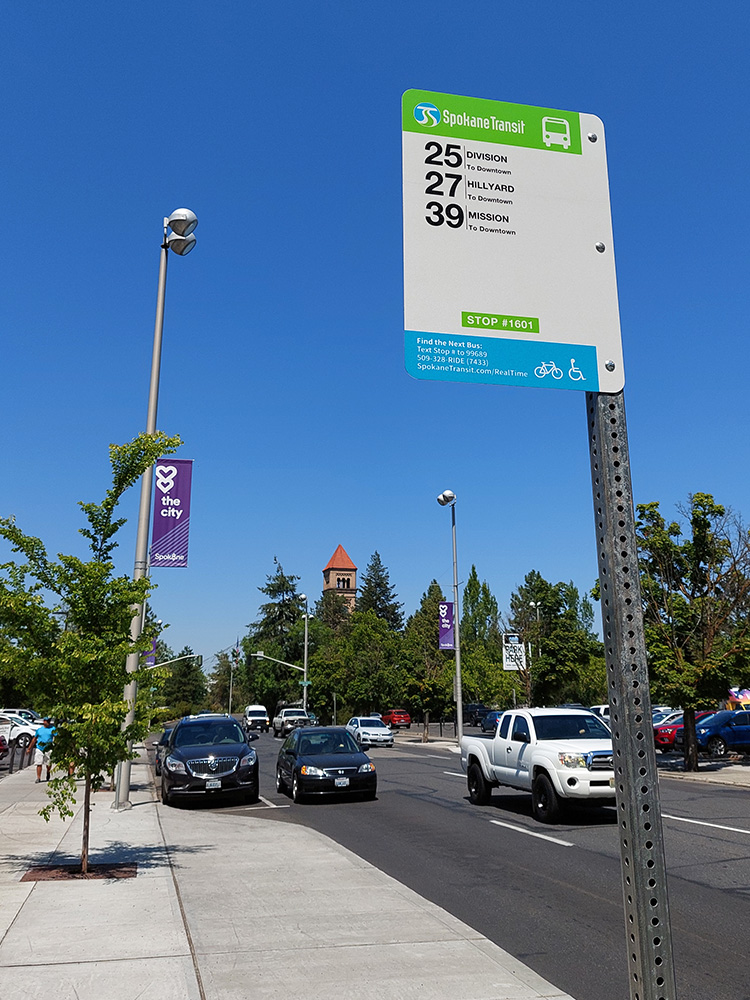
Bus bulb stop

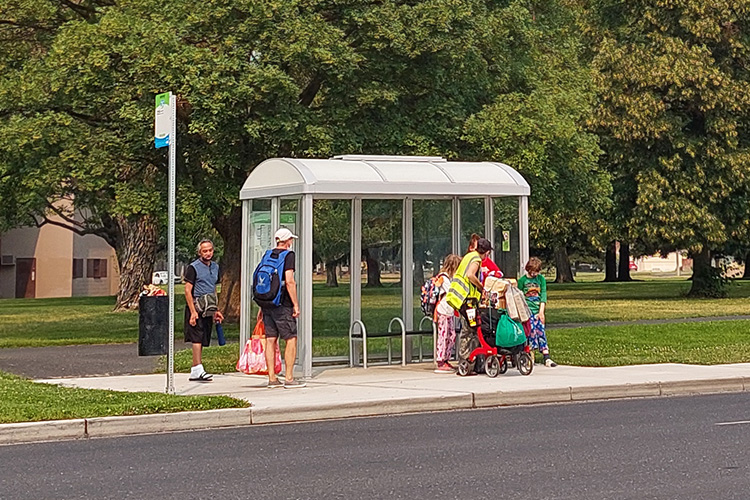
Bus shelter stop with trash can

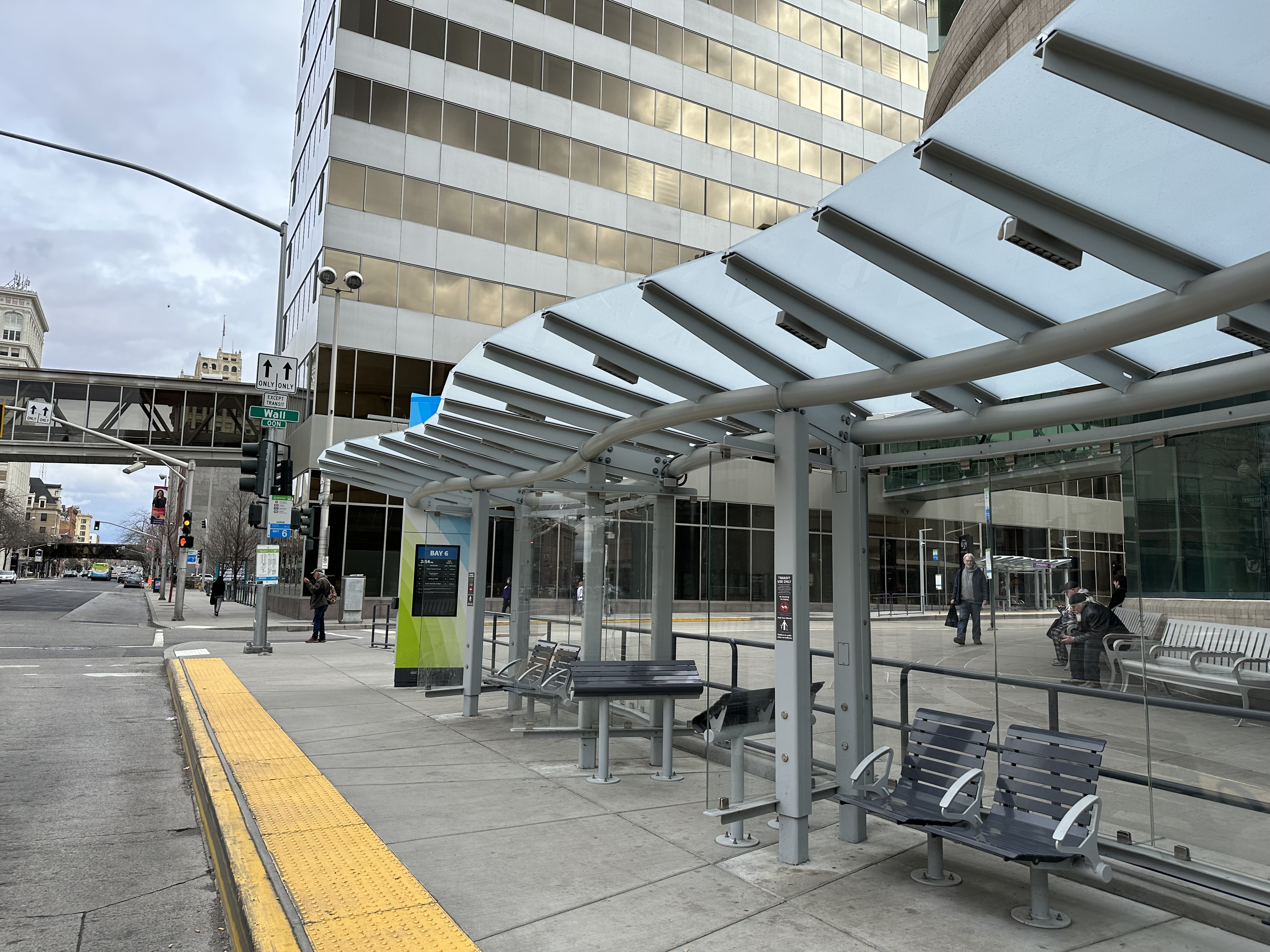
High-Performance Transit shelter

Four typical formats of Spokane Transit Authority bus stops, featuring different levels of passenger and transit operation amenities. All stops feature a sign denoting the routes serving the stop, along with their terminus, as well as a unique stop identification number used for STA's real-time bus tracking information.

As of 2025, Spokane Transit has 1,676 bus stops throughout its service area. Of them, 154 have standalone passenger shelters and others are part of transit centers and park-and-ride lots. Spokane Transit operates a total of 14 park-and-ride facilities throughout its service area, several of which are operated through cooperative agreements with other property owners to allow parking access to transit services.

Spokane Transit operates five transit centers as of 2026:

- STA Plaza, in downtown Spokane
- Pence-Cole Valley Transit Center (VTC), in Spokane Valley
- Spokane Community College Transit Center, in Chief Garry Park in East Spokane
- West Plains Transit Center, near Four Lakes
- Mirabeau Transit Center in Spokane Valley

== Fares ==
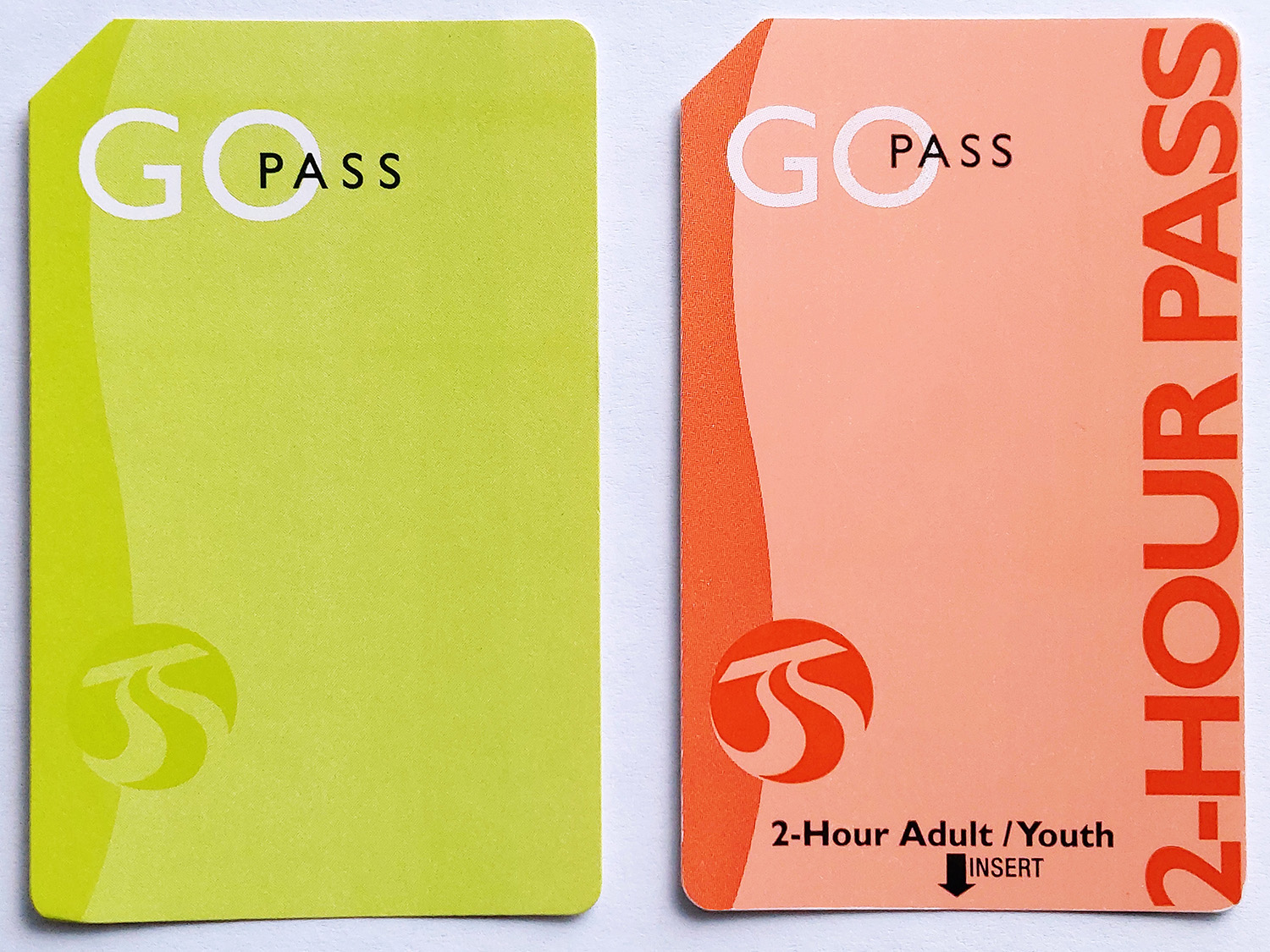
The STA GO Passes, a magnetic stripe fare card, used from 2006 to 2026. The green card (left) is a paper card issued upon purchase of a fare on board a bus. The orange card (right) is a plastic pre-purchased fare card that can be activated upon boarding a bus.

As of 2023, the standard adult fare for Spokane Transit buses and paratransit is $2. Discounted fares are available for passengers with "honored rider" status (passengers with disabilities or aged 60 years or older); active-duty military and veterans; students over the age of 19; and low-income households enrolled in the Opportunity pilot program. Youth riders under the age of 19 are not charged a fare under the state's Climate Commitment Act; a Rider's License or other ID card is required for passengers between 6 and 19.

A single fare allows passengers to board any route for a period of two hours from initial purchase or validation on the bus. On October 1, 2022, Spokane Transit debuted a new account-based NFC fare collection system, known as the Connect fare system. The fare system was developed by INIT SE and includes online account management, a smart card known as the Connect card, and the STA Connect mobile app. Passengers are able to reload fares at the STA Plaza or partnered retail locations and have fare caps when using the same device or payment card on a daily and monthly basis. The agency also offers several discount programs. Traditional fareboxes remain on all fixed route coaches, allowing riders to pay with cash or a printed QR code ticket.

Spokane Transit initially used metal token coins and paper transfers. A magnetic stripe card, known as the "GO Pass", debuted in December 2006 and was retired in October 2026. In July 2023, the system began accepting contactless payments including Visa, Mastercard, Discover, and digital wallets (Apple Pay and Google Pay) with onboard fare collection boxes as well as off-board fare validators and fare vending machines.

=== Pass programs ===
STA has business programs that provide fare passes for regional employers that distribute them to employees at various rates. Large employers and organizations are able to enroll in the Universal Transit Access Pass program, which provides passes with unlimited rides. STA also offers free or discounted fares for faculty, staff, and enrolled students of Eastern Washington University, Gonzaga University, Spokane Colleges, and Washington State University Spokane. These fares are loaded onto the STA Connect app and connected to an online account or a physical fare card.

== Administration ==
Spokane Transit is a public transportation benefit area (PTBA), a type of special district in Washington state that directs local taxes towards transit use. The PTBA covers 248 square miles (640 km^{2}) of urbanized Spokane County and includes the cities of Spokane, Spokane Valley, Liberty Lake, Cheney, Airway Heights, Medical Lake, Millwood, and some unincorporated areas. As of 2026, the district has a population of approximately 485,421 residents—ranked third in Washington behind Community Transit (Snohomish County) and Pierce Transit.

The agency is governed by a board of directors composed of nine positions filled by elected officials who must be appointed by the municipalities in the PTBA, and one non-voting position appointed by the board upon recommendation by the labor organizations representing the public transportation employees within the local public transportation system pursuant to state law. The board's composition is periodically updated to maintain proportional representation relative to population and to also reflect boundary changes. As of 2026, the board's voting positions comprise four members selected from the City of Spokane, two members from Spokane Valley, two members from the Spokane County Commissioners, and two members from five cities who are rotated every two years. The board's members are also appointed to serve on several committees and advisory bodies who report to the board of directors.

The board originally comprised two members from Spokane and Spokane County, a third member from either that alternated each year, and one member from each other municipality. Two new cities—Liberty Lake and Spokane Valley—were incorporated in the early 2000s and necessitated a change in board composition. Spokane Transit is also a member jurisdiction of the Spokane Regional Transportation Council (SRTC), which coordinates regional transportation and land use planning activities for the metropolitan area. The SRTC also disburses transportation funding from the state and federal governments as part of its role as a metropolitan planning organization.

Spokane Transit has an operating budget of $143.4 million in 2026 and a total workforce of 812 full-time employees and 25 part-time employees. The agency derives nearly 75 percent of its annual revenue from a 0.8 percent sales tax that is levied within the public transportation benefit area. The chief executive officer is appointed by the board of directors and leads an executive team with several officer positions. Since August 2025, Spokane Transit's chief executive officer has been Karl Otterstrom. He had been the interim co-CEO and succeeded Susan Meyer, who retired in 2024 after nearly 20 years as CEO.

== Ridership ==
Annual ridership by service type
Year	Total Ridership	Fixed Route	Paratransit	Rideshare
2006	9,179,067	8,408,678	493,981	276,408
2007	10,218,502	9,436,662	506,710	275,130
2008	11,904,520	11,110,476	516,516	277,528
2009	11,883,773	11,152,408	521,578	209,787
2010	11,441,913	10,710,528	517,192	214,193
2011	11,550,363	10,831,987	485,551	232,825
2012	11,771,880	11,031,338	490,106	250,436
2013	11,811,344	11,087,049	483,038	241,257
2014	12,045,936	11,324,434	475,171	246,331
2015	11,499,762	10,815,736	464,448	219,578
2016	10,922,872	10,261,816	468,050	193,006
2017	10,920,438	10,264,971	477,010	178,457
2018	10,703,052	10,069,599	476,020	157,433
2019	10,569,104	9,971,798	442,044	155,262
2020	6,114,361	5,817,776	205,815	90,770
2021	5,560,634	5,238,135	252,201	70,298
2022	7,013,222	6,595,319	327,327	90,576
2023	9,403,347	8,947,157	360,535	95,655
2024	10,661,102	10,166,876	390,956	103,270
2025	10,940,666	10,432,622	402,176	105,868

== Fleet ==
As of 2026, Spokane Transit has a fleet of 195 buses for fixed route service, 134 vans for paratransit, and 125 vehicles for vanpool and other services. Most of the fixed route fleet comprises buses manufactured by New Flyer and Gillig that are typically 40 feet (12 m) for most models or 60 feet (18 m) for articulated buses. The agency's first battery electric units were New Flyer Xcelsior articulated buses ordered for the City Line that arrived in 2023.

All fixed routes have buses with racks that can fit three bikes on the exterior of the bus. Most park and ride lots feature bike lockers that can be rented on a monthly basis. The articulated buses on the City Line are able to accommodate bikes on board the bus via the rear doors. STA has a fleet of seven double-decker buses from Alexander Dennis that entered service in 2025. They seat 82 passengers and can carry up to 108 at crush loads; the buses were assigned to routes 6 and 66, which serve Cheney and the Eastern Washington University campus. The agency formerly had a set of short buses painted in a green replica trolley livery that ran from 1994 to 2009 on downtown shuttle routes.

Spokane Transit Authority fixed route fleet (as of July 2026)
Manufacturer	Model	Image	Year	Qty.	Length	Seats	Fuel type
New Flyer	D60LF		2006	6	60 ft (18 m)	62	Diesel
New Flyer	D60LF		2009	4	60 ft (18 m)	62	Diesel
New Flyer	Xcelsior		2017	3	60 ft (18 m)	62	Diesel
New Flyer	Xcelsior		2018	7	60 ft (18 m)	62	Diesel
New Flyer	Xcelsior		2021	2	40 ft (12 m)	39	Diesel
New Flyer	Xcelsior		2022	10	40 ft (12 m)	37	Diesel
New Flyer	Xcelsior		2025	17	40 ft (12 m)	39	Diesel
New Flyer	Xcelsior Charge		2021	11	60 ft (18 m)	62	Electric
New Flyer	Xcelsior Charge		2023	4	60 ft (18 m)	62	Electric
New Flyer	Xcelsior Charge	Spokane Transit New Flyer XE35 March 2024	2021	2	40 ft (12 m)	39	Electric
New Flyer	Xcelsior Charge	Spokane Transit New Flyer XE35 March 2024	2023	9	40 ft (12 m)	39	Electric
New Flyer	Xcelsior Charge	Spokane Transit New Flyer XE35 March 2024	2023	3	35 ft (11 m)	31	Electric
Gillig	Low Floor		2007	1	40 ft (12 m)	39	Diesel
Gillig	Low Floor		2008	14	40 ft (12 m)	39	Diesel
Gillig	Low Floor		2009	9	40 ft (12 m)	39	Diesel
Gillig	Low Floor		2014	8	40 ft (12 m)	39	Diesel
Gillig	Low Floor		2016	7	40 ft (12 m)	39	Diesel
Gillig	Low Floor		2017	6	40 ft (12 m)	39	Diesel
Gillig	Low Floor		2018	6	40 ft (12 m)	39	Diesel
Gillig	Low Floor		2019	6	40 ft (12 m)	39	Diesel
Gillig	Low Floor		2021	16	40 ft (12 m)	39	Diesel
Gillig	Low Floor HEV		2008	5	40 ft (12 m)	39	Hybrid
Gillig	Low Floor HEV		2009	3	29 ft (8.8 m)	26	Hybrid
Gillig	Low Floor HEV		2010	10	40 ft (12 m)	39	Hybrid
Gillig	Low Floor HEV		2012	6	40 ft (12 m)	39	Hybrid
Proterra	ZX5		2021	2	40 ft (12 m)	40	Electric
Proterra	ZX5		2022	10	40 ft (12 m)	40	Electric
Alexander Dennis	Enviro500 MMC		2025	7	42 ft (13 m)	82	Diesel

== See also ==
- History of high-capacity transit in Spokane, Washington
