= STA Plaza =

Transit center in Downtown Spokane, Washington, USA

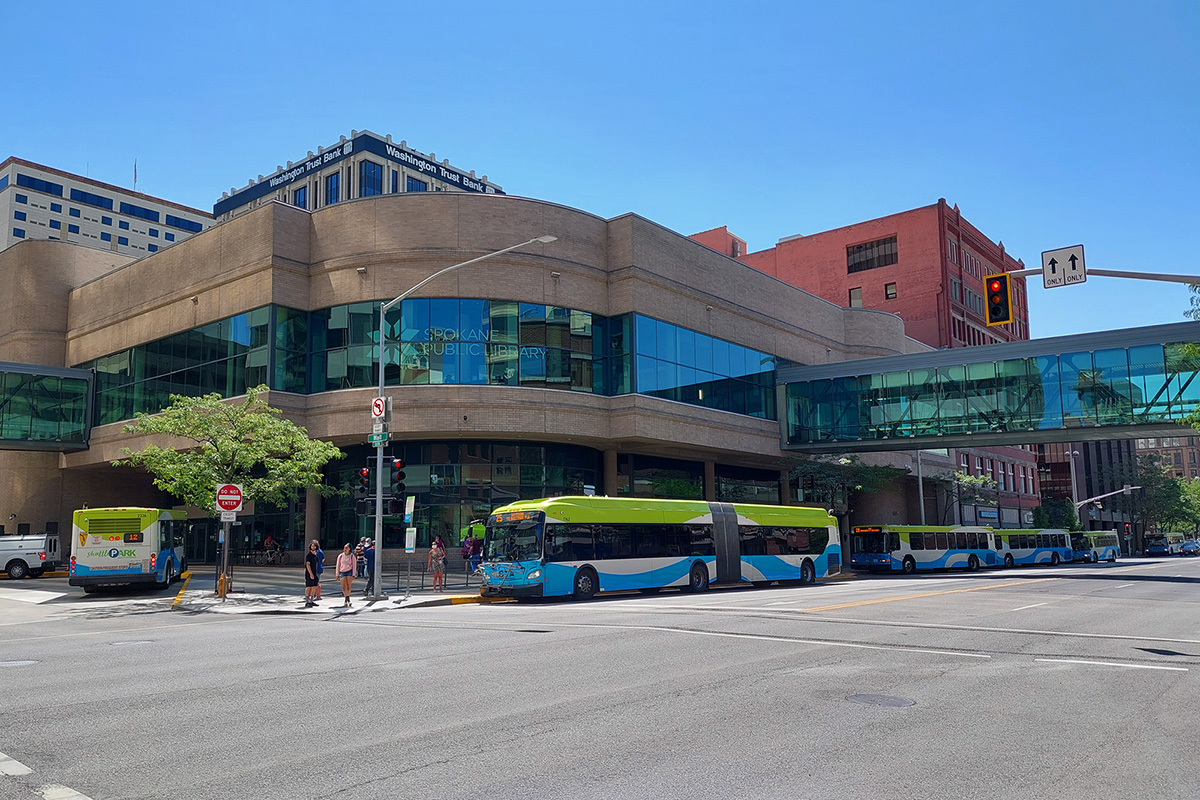

General information
- Location: 701 West Riverside Avenue, Spokane, WA 99201
- Coordinates: 47.6576°N 117.4227°W
- Owner: Spokane Transit Authority
- Bus routes: 31
- Bus stands: 13
- Connections: Travel Washington Gold Line

Construction
- Structure type: At-grade
- Accessible: Yes

Other information
- Website: spokanetransit.com

History
- Opened: July 16, 1995

Passengers
- 13,051 (avg. weekday, 2022)
Location

The STA Plaza (The Plaza or Spokane Transit Authority Plaza), is a transit center located in Downtown Spokane, Washington. It is the main hub of customer service and transit operations for the Spokane Transit Authority (STA), with 31 out of its 52 bus routes connecting with The Plaza. Transit operations through the Plaza resemble that of an airline hub, with bays of buses arriving and departing in waves, providing timed transfer opportunities for passengers.

It is one of Spokane Transit's four primary transit centers, along with the Spokane Community College, Pence-Cole Valley, and West Plains transit centers.

== History ==
Prior to the construction of the STA Plaza, Spokane Transit's downtown bus operations were dispersed outdoors along downtown streets obstructing storefronts and congesting sidewalks.

As early as the 1970s, discussions were in place to centralize operations and create an indoor facility for passengers to wait and make transfers. The initial proposal was a public-private partnership that would have built the transit center on the ground floor of a new high rise office and retail building. However, after the deal collapsed, the plan evolved into a two-story building to be developed by Spokane Transit Authority.

The facility opened in the summer of 1995 and was designed by Tan Boyle Heyamoto Architects.

The interior of the STA Plaza underwent a major renovation in 2017. Open space within the plaza atrium was expanded and improvements such as electronic arrival monitoring boards were added. The renovation was designed by ALSC architects.

In preparation of the City Line, Plaza Bays 9 and 10 were upgraded with raised platforms, shelters, digital real-time arrivals board, off-board fare collection, and a City Line branded station marker. Plaza Bay 6 was also later upgraded with similar amenities during a Riverside Avenue reconstruction project in anticipation of future high performance transit lines. In May 2023, Bays 3, 4, 5, 6, 8, 11, and 12 also received STA branded station markers with digital real-time arrival times.

== Features ==
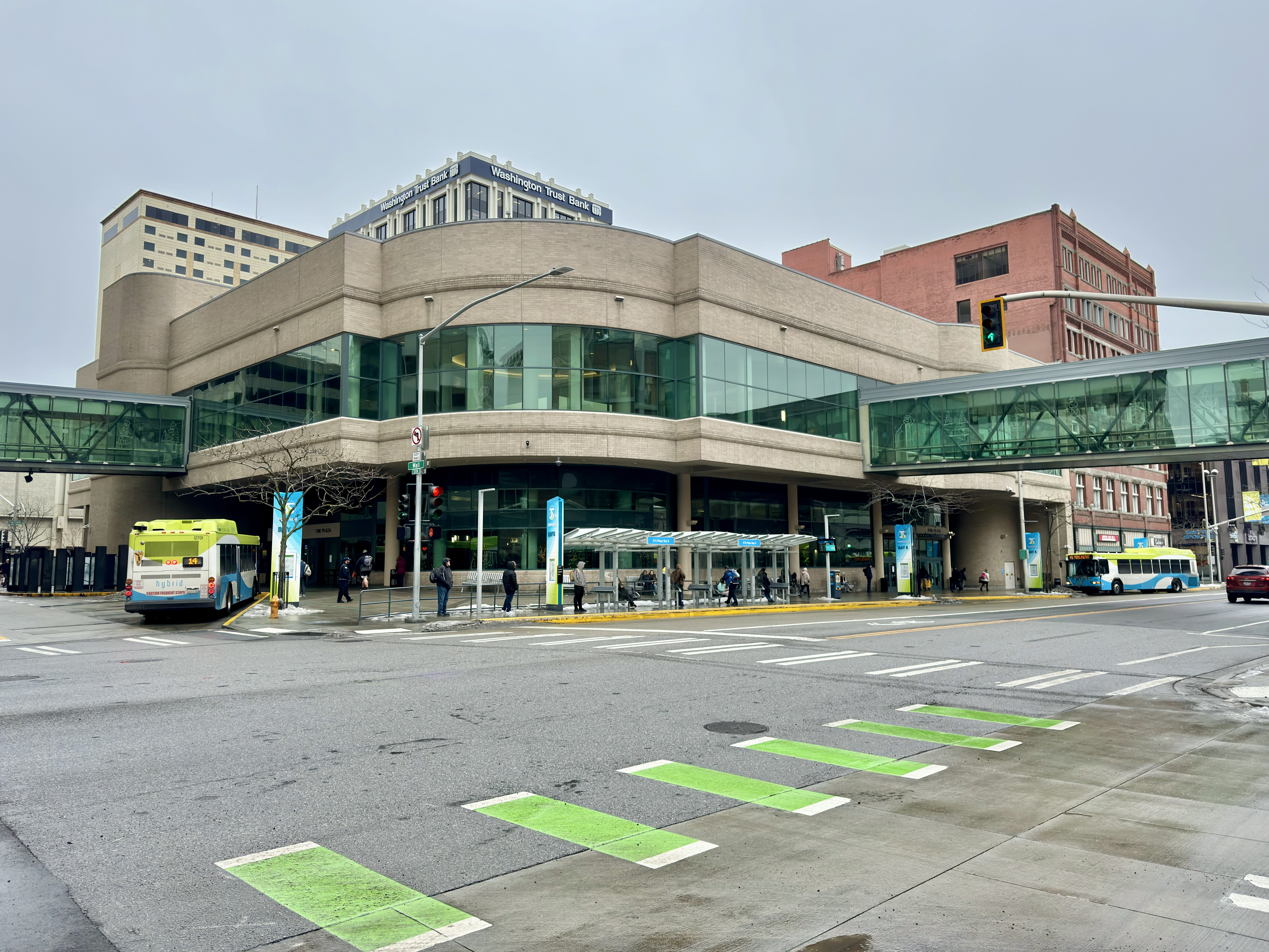
STA Plaza, January 2024

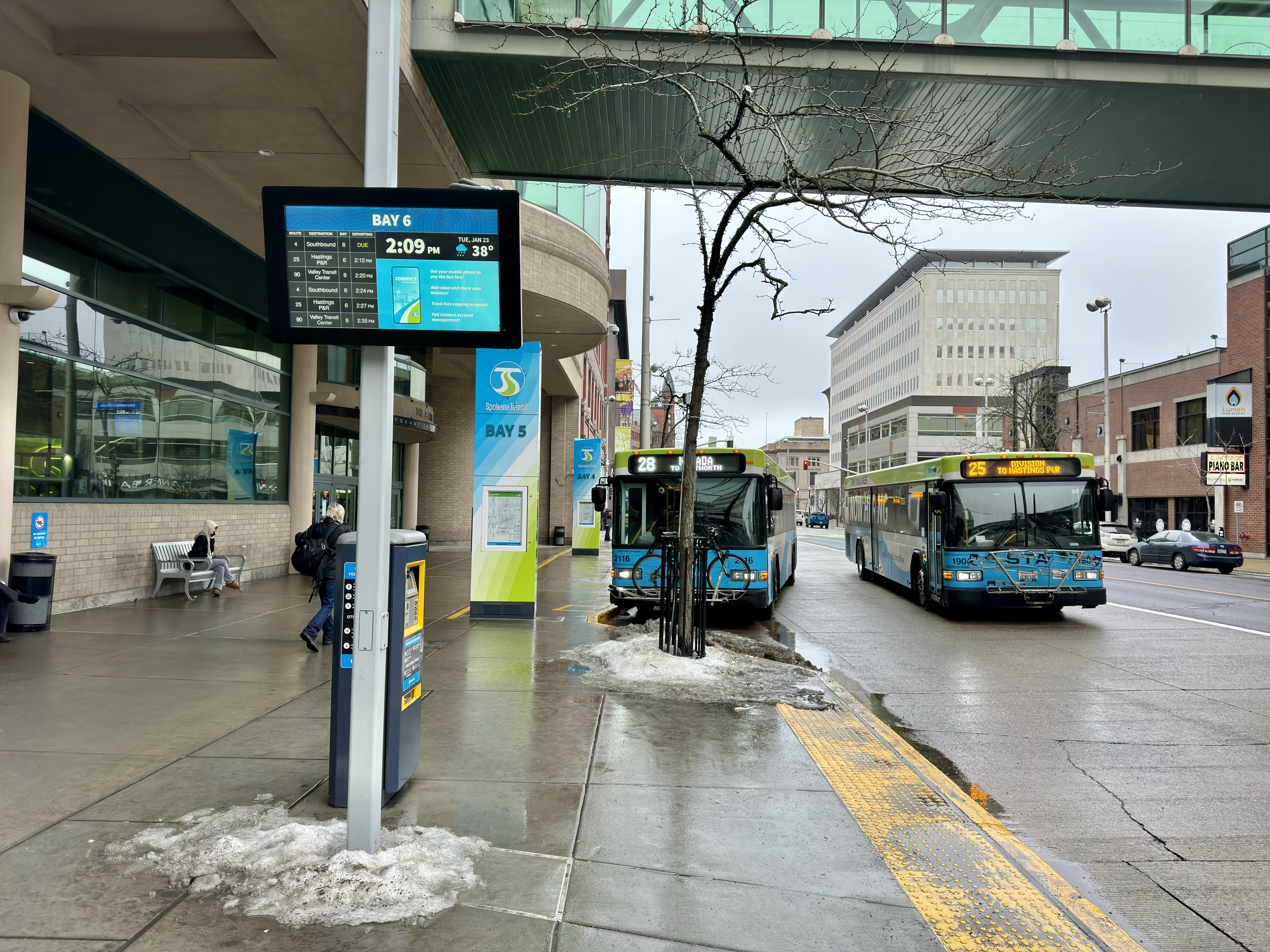
Real-time arrival display and bay markers

The Plaza is located in Downtown Spokane with access to the adjacent streets on three sides. The Plaza is also connected to the buildings to the immediate North and East of it via the skywalk system. This system allows indoor walkability to River Park Square mall, Spokane City Hall, Spokane Public Library's Central library, and the Parkade Plaza parking garage, among others. A Spokane Police precinct was also opened across the street in 2020.

The Plaza contains a Subway location, Joe's Mini Market, and STA's customer service and security offices. There is also seating, public restrooms, and real-time arrival boards. The second floor had offices and stores that were closed in 2020; they are planned to be renovated into a boardroom for STA and other spaces by 2028.

As of May 2023, there are 13 STA branded bay markers with digital real-time arrival screens. Three of the bays include high performance transit amenities such as raised platforms for near level boarding, shelters, and off-board fare collection.
