= Pence-Cole Valley Transit Center =

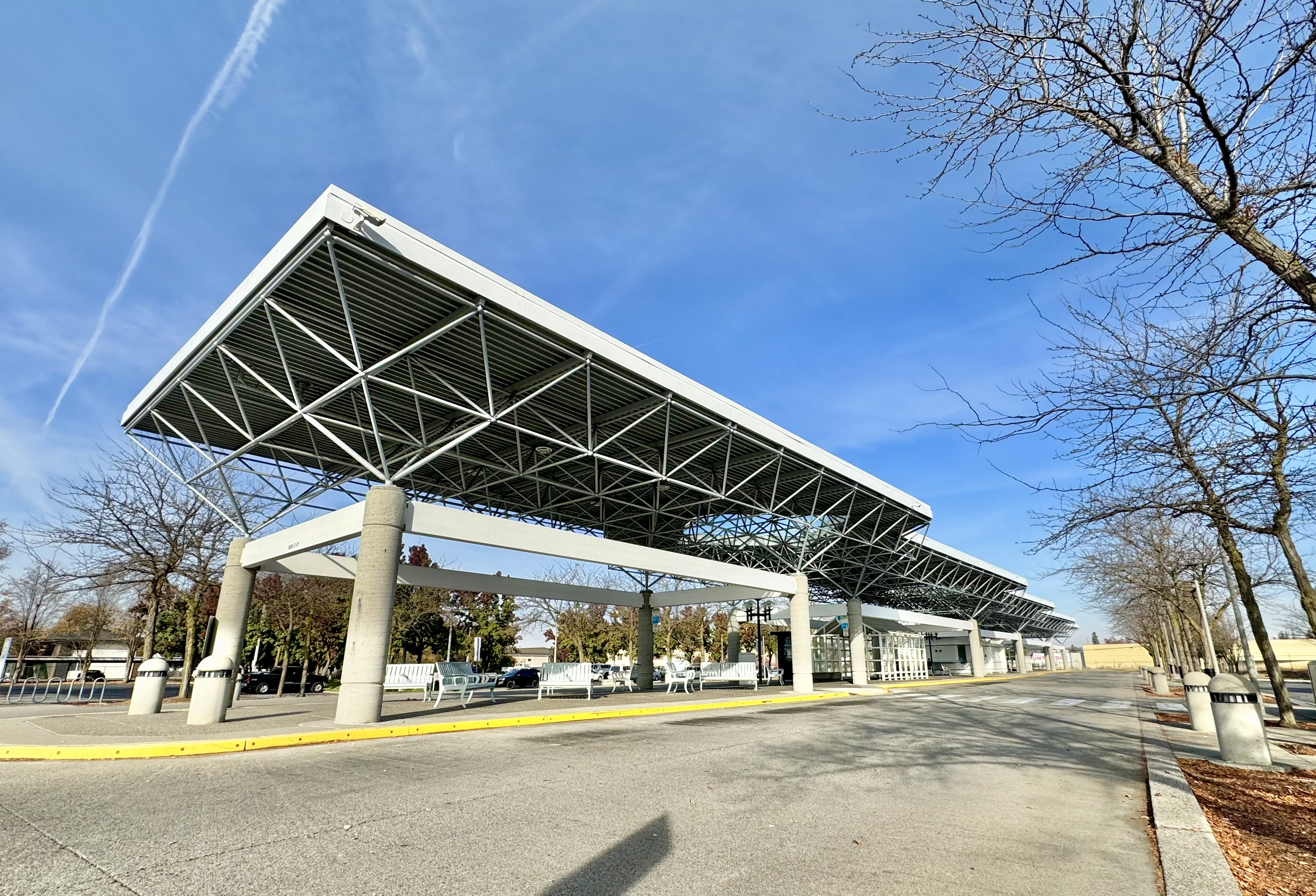
- Valley Transit Center October 2023

General information
- Location: 10501 E 4th Ave., Spokane, WA 99206
- Coordinates: 47.654061°N 117.262960°W
- System: STA transit center
- Owner: Spokane Transit Authority
- Bus stands: 10

Construction
- Parking: 236 spaces
- Cycle facilities: Bicycle lockers
- Accessible: Yes

History
- Opened: 1989

Passengers
- 1,815 (avg. weekday, 2022)
Location

Pence-Cole Valley Transit Center (also Valley Transit Center or VTC) is a transit center and former proposed site of a light rail station in the Spokane Transit Authority route system. It is one of Spokane Transit's three primary transit centers, along with the Spokane Community College and STA Plaza, and is the main transit hub for Spokane Valley.

== History ==
In the early 1980s, then-unincorporated Spokane Valley and its surrounding area was home to over 90,000 residents but was served by just two bus routes. At the time, public transportation in the Spokane region was controlled by the City of Spokane's owned and operated Spokane Transit System. Therefore, both routes headed toward Downtown Spokane, making transfers and connections within the Valley impossible. Riders had to needlessly travel 7 miles out of direction just to make a connection to the other route serving the Valley. Additionally, due to funding issues with the existing system, routes destined for outside city limits were in danger of being eliminated on April 1, 1981. To save transit service outside Spokane city limits, voters approved a plan on March 10, 1981, to replace the City of Spokane's owned and operated system with a new, county-wide transit system, known as Spokane Transit Authority. Voters overwhelmingly passed the measure by over 70 percent. Voter eligibility represented over 90 percent of the residents in Spokane County.

A second major purpose of the county-wide taxpayer funded transit system was to radically transform and develop public transportation outside the city limits of Spokane. The Pence-Cole Valley Transit Center was a cornerstone of that plan. The construction of the transit center, which opened in 1989, enabled localized transit to be a possibility for Spokane Valley. Numerous local routes were developed, as well as regional routes that allowed passengers to travel directly to major activity centers around the Spokane region, without having to pass through Downtown Spokane. Today, the VTC serves as the terminus and connecting hub for six STA routes.

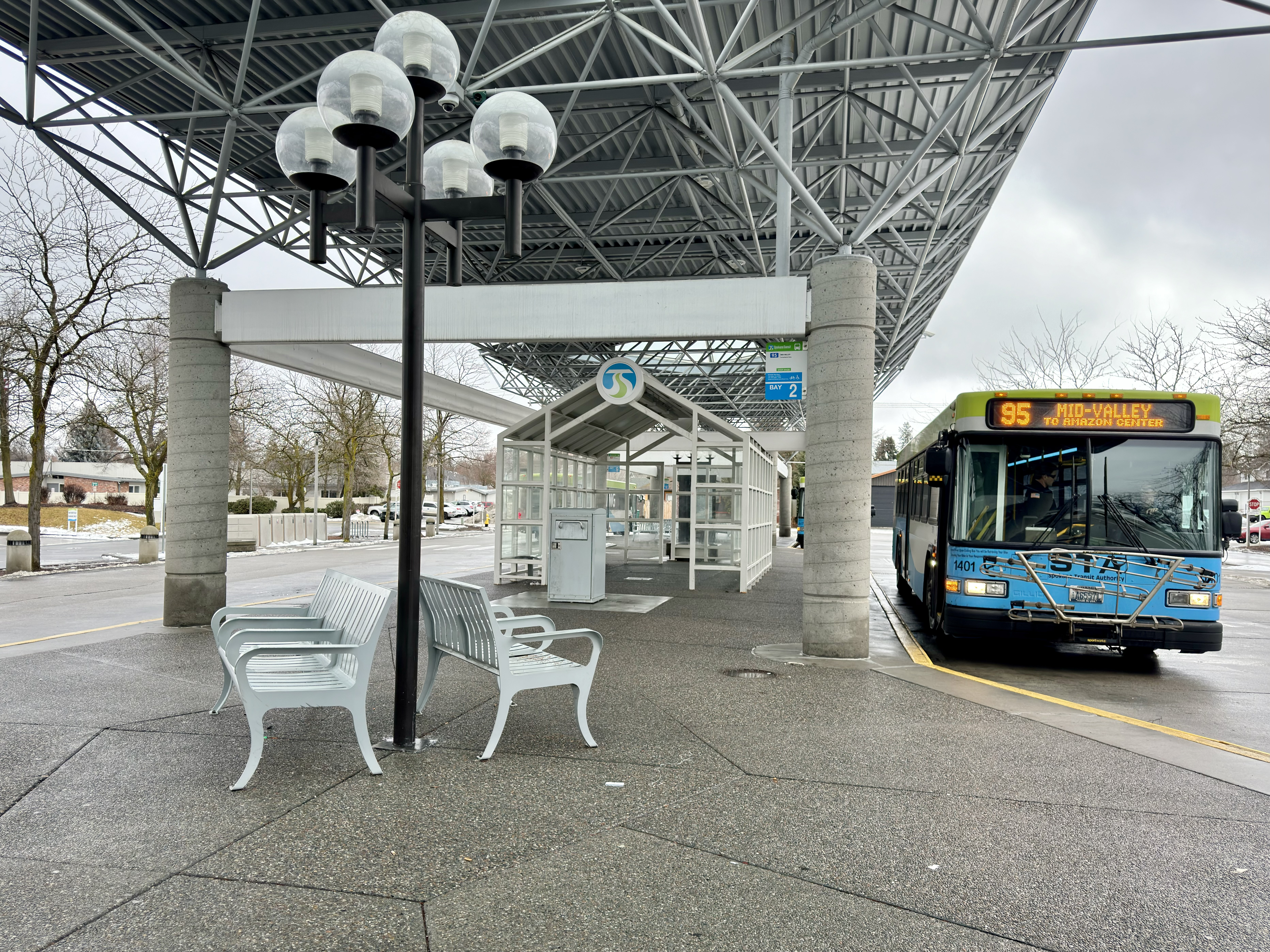
VTC, January 2024

Because of the transit center's historical prominence in the transformation of Spokane Transit's operations, the center is named for former Millwood mayor and STA board member, Clarence Pence, as well as Bob Cole, who played prominent role in the aforementioned expansion of public transportation in the Spokane region.

In 2022, responding to population growth in the suburban areas to the east of the city of Spokane, from Spokane Valley into North Idaho, the Spokane Transit Authority began working on the I-90/Valley Corridor High Performance Transit. The project, expected to be completed by 2025, will increase services to the Valley Transit Center.

In 2023, a bus-only entrance to the north side of the facility was added to bypass two intersections. The STA 2024 budget also includes funding for battery electric bus charging infrastructure to be installed in 2025.

== Early 2000s light rail proposal ==
The Pence-Cole Valley Transit Center played a key role in STA's early 2000s light rail proposal. The transit center would have been incorporated into the proposed University City Station which was identified as one of three key stations along the light rail route that would spurn nearly $1 billion in Transit-oriented development under the principles of new urbanism. Forecasts projected the station to be a catalyst for the development of the University City town center, which would have seen as many as 2,300 residential units, 231,000 square feet of office space, and 115,000 square feet of retail space developed over time.

== Services ==
As of October 2024, the Valley Transit Center is served by eight bus routes.

=== Bus routes ===
Route	Bay	Termini			Service level and notes
9; Sprague	9	Spokane Valley; Valley Transit Center	↔	Downtown Spokane; STA Plaza	Frequent route
95; Mid-Valley	2	Spokane Valley; Valley Transit Center	↔	Spokane Valley; Amazon Center (Valley)	Regular route
96; Pines/Sullivan	10	Spokane Valley; Valley Transit Center	↔	Spokane Valley; Evergreen @ Trent	Regular route
97; South Valley	1	Spokane Valley; Valley Transit Center	↔	Spokane Valley; Mirabeau Point Transit Center	Regular route
98; Liberty Lake via Sprague	8	Spokane Valley; Valley Transit Center	↔	Liberty Lake; Liberty Lake Park & Ride	Regular route
173; VTC Express	7	Spokane Valley; Valley Transit Center	↔	Downtown Spokane; STA Plaza	Commuter route
190; Valley Express	6	Spokane Valley; Valley Transit Center	↔	Downtown Spokane; STA Plaza	Commuter route
663; EWU VTC Express	4	Spokane Valley; Valley Transit Center	↔	Cheney; Eastern Washington University	Commuter route
