= Education in Spokane, Washington =

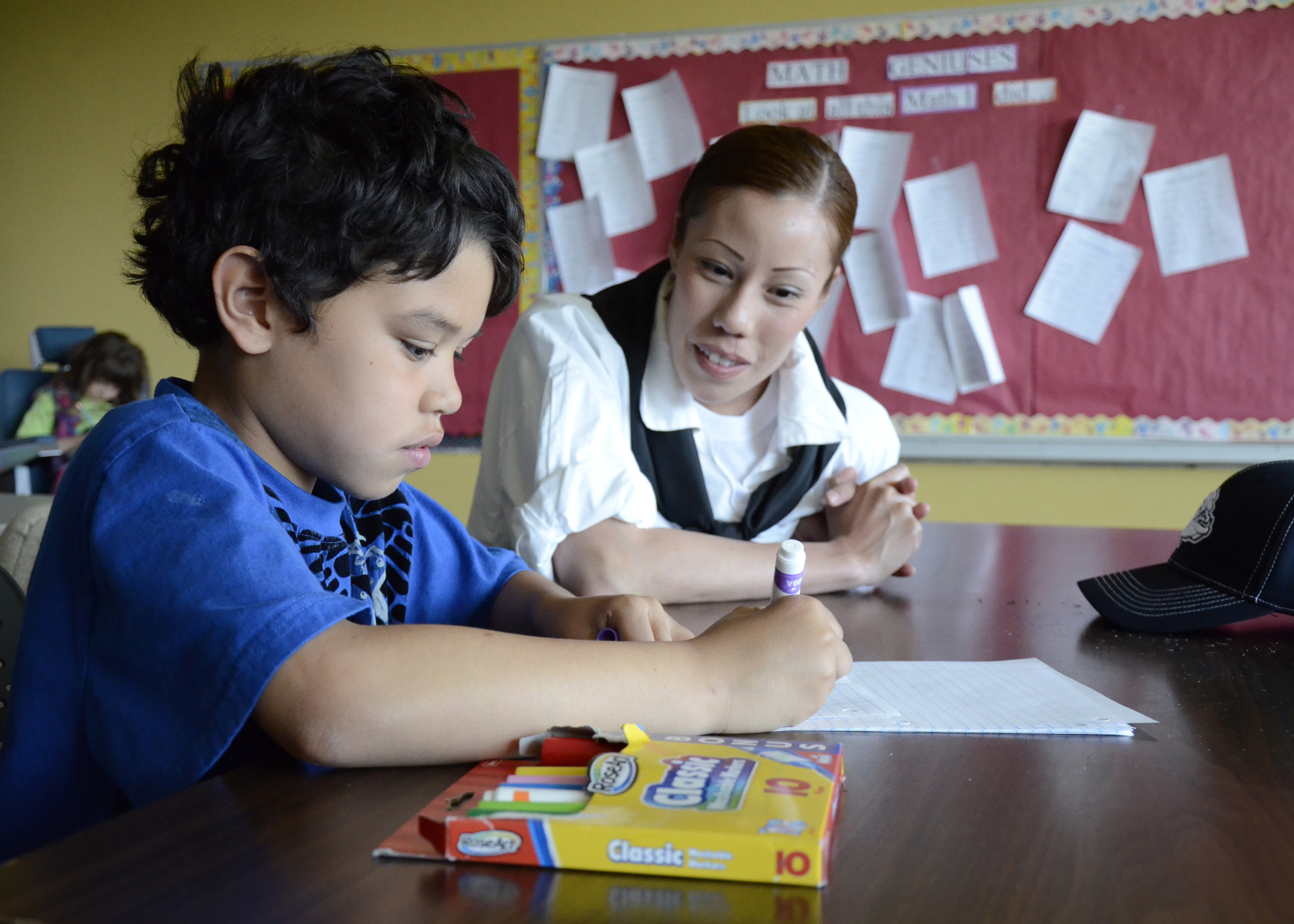

The Spokane Public Library and Spokane County Library District system provide the Spokane area with access to information and study space. Secondary education is provided by Spokane Public Schools with its six high schools, six middle schools, and thirty-four elementary schools. Public charter, private, and parochial schools offer more choices of study. Higher education in Spokane is served by the Community Colleges of Spokane system (Spokane Community College and Spokane Falls Community College) and two private universities, Gonzaga University and Whitworth University as well as various trade and technical schools. The University District in Downtown Spokane is also host to branch locations of regional universities such as Washington State University Spokane and its medical school, the Elson S. Floyd College of Medicine.

According to the U.S. Census Bureau, the total school enrollment in Spokane was 54,830 in 2011. Nursery school and kindergarten enrollment was 5,484 and elementary or high school enrollment was 30,548 children. College or graduate school enrollment was 18,798. As of 2011, 91.6 percent of people 25 years and over had at least graduated from high school and 29.2 percent had a bachelor's degree or higher.

== Libraries ==
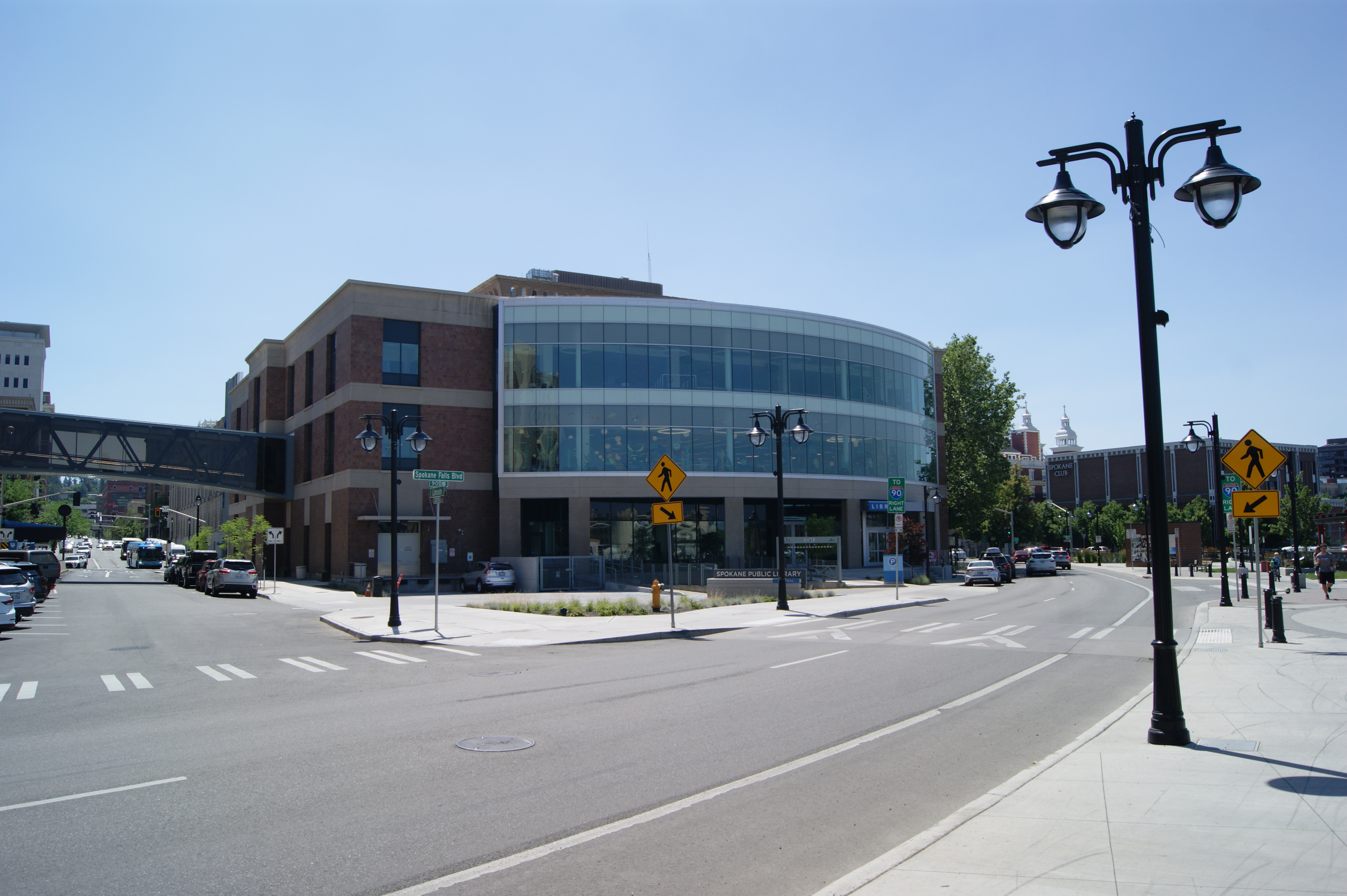
Spokane Public Library - Central branch

Serving the general educational needs of the local population are two public library districts, the Spokane Public Library (within city limits) and the Spokane County Library District. Founded in 1904 with funding from philanthropist Andrew Carnegie, the Spokane Public Library system comprises a downtown library overlooking the Spokane Falls and five branch libraries. Special collections focus on Inland Pacific Northwest history and include reference books, periodicals, maps, photographs, and other archival materials and government documents. The downtown Spokane Public Library branch located at 906 West Main has a collection size of 435,902 volumes and an annual circulation of 2,060,220 items per year. The first downtown library building, The Carnegie Building, still stands 5 blocks from the current Downtown library.

The libraries for the colleges and universities in Spokane include the Spokane Community College Library, Spokane Falls Community College Library, Gonzaga's Foley Center Library which has a collection size of 427,262 volumes and annual circulation of 48,889 items per year as well as their School of Law's Chastek Library and Whitworth's Harriet Cheney Cowles Memorial Library which has a collection size of 220,568 and an annual circulation of 19,672.

== Elementary and secondary education ==
=== Public school system ===
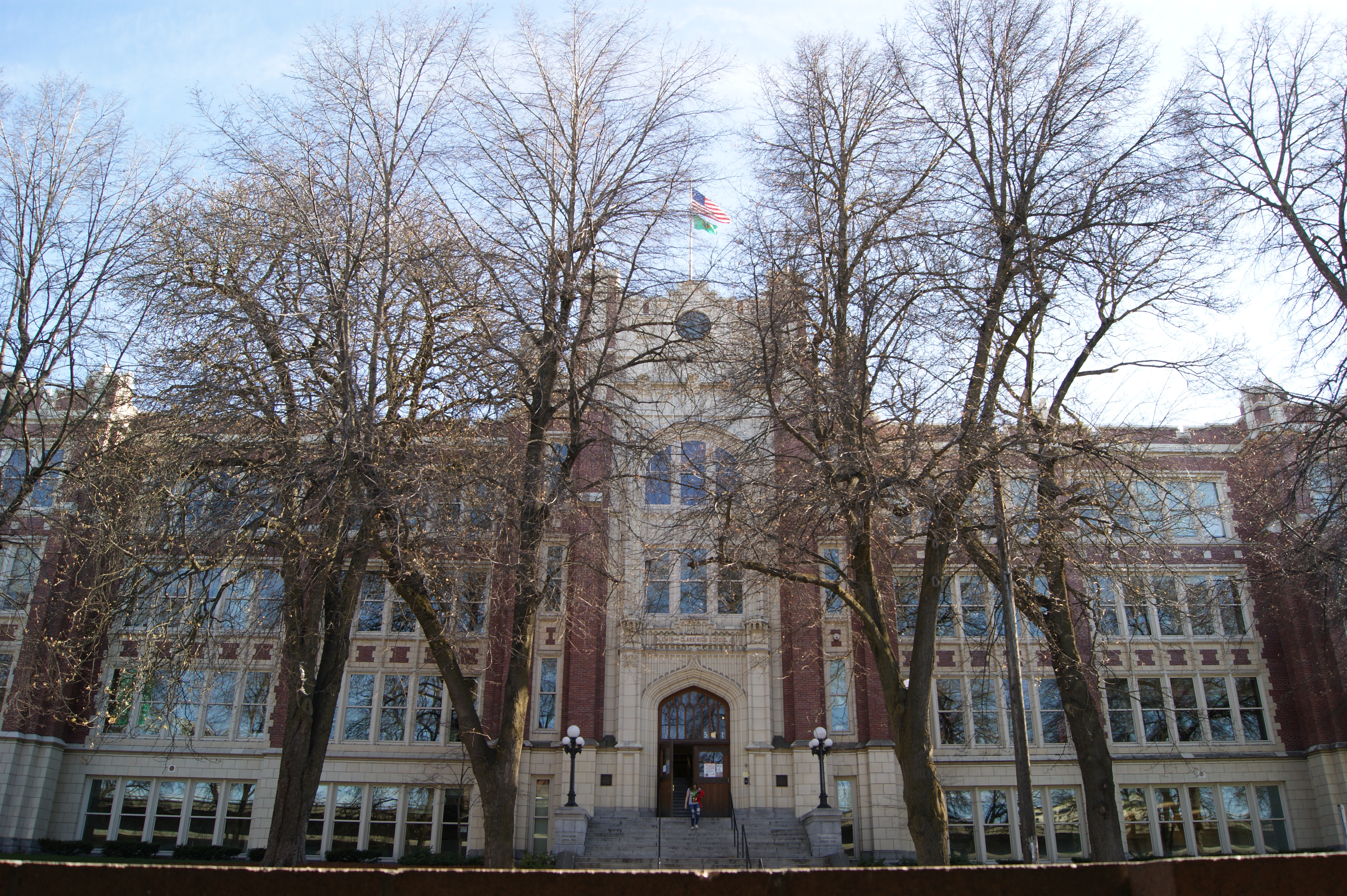
Lewis and Clark High School

The vast majority of Spokane is within the Spokane Public Schools (District No. 81).

Spokane Public Schools was organized in 1889, and is the largest public school system in Spokane, and the second-largest in the state, as of 2014, serving roughly 30,000 students in six high schools, six middle schools, and thirty-four elementary schools. Within Spokane Public Schools, there are two Washington State Charter School commission approved independent charter schools to provide alternative choices to traditional high schools, these are Innovation High School in the independent PRIDE Schools district and the Spokane International Academy.

Some portions of the city limits to the north are within the Mead School District No. 354. That district has two traditional high schools, Mead High School and Mt. Spokane High School.

Some portions of the city limits to the west are in the Cheney School District.

Other major public school districts in the Spokane area include the Central Valley School District (which contains Central Valley High School, University High School, and Ridgeline High School), West Valley School District (West Valley High School), and East Valley School District (East Valley High School) in Spokane Valley. Smaller districts in the surrounding area include the Deer Park School District (Deer Park High School), Freeman School District (Freeman High School), Liberty School District (Liberty High School), Medical Lake School District (Medical Lake High School), Nine Mile Falls School District (Lakeside High School), Orchard Prairie School District, and Riverside School District (Riverside High School).

==== Spokane area public high schools ====
School name	District	Established	Enrollment	Notes
Lewis and Clark High School	Spokane Public Schools	1883	1,863	
North Central High School	Spokane Public Schools	1908	1,521	Houses the Institute of Science and Technology program for STEM
John R. Rogers High School	Spokane Public Schools	1932	1,514	
Shadle Park High School	Spokane Public Schools	1957	1,218	
Joel E. Ferris High School	Spokane Public Schools	1963	1,746	
Mead High School	Mead School District	1890	1,637	
Mt. Spokane High School	Mead School District	1997	1,596	
The Community School	Spokane Public Schools	2012	165	New Technology High School
Innovation High School	(PRIDE Schools)	2015	498	Public nonprofit Charter school, IB World School, Grades 6-12
Spokane International Academy	-	2015	501	Public nonprofit charter school, Grades K-12
West Valley High School	West Valley School District	1924	932	
Central Valley High School	Central Valley School District	1927	2,250	
University High School	Central Valley School District	1960	1,747	
East Valley High School	East Valley School District	1960	1,133	
Ridgeline High School	Central Valley School District	2021	1,600	

Note:

- This is not an exhaustive list. This is a selective list that is intended to focus on public high schools in school districts that have a presence in the city of Spokane and may include other major districts or high schools in the Spokane metropolitan area (Spokane County).
- Enrollment figures as of April 2021.

=== Private education ===
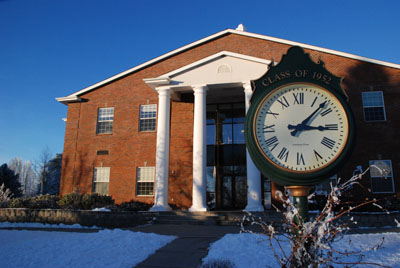
Upper Columbia Academy in Spangle

A variety of private and parochial elementary and secondary schools augment the public school system. Among the parochial schools, the Roman Catholic Diocese of Spokane manages ten such schools in and around the area, among them being Gonzaga Preparatory School. Other parochial schools in the Spokane metro area include Upper Columbia Academy, a boarding high school offering a Seventh-day Adventist education, located to the south in Spangle, and the Northwest Christian School, a non-denominational Kindergarten-12th grade school, to the north in Colbert. The Saint George's School in north Spokane is one of the only K-12 independent secular private preparatory schools in Spokane and offers an International Baccalaureate program of study.

There are schools that exist to meet special needs and those that offer specialist education, such as Montessori schools, or an emphasis on a particular part of the curriculum. Private schools are subject to a state approval process. Examples include the Lilac Blind Foundation, Spokane Guild's School and Neuromuscular Center, and the Spokane Art School.

The Salish School of Spokane is a language preservation school that serves the Native American community of various tribal backgrounds and ancestry with language and cultural immersion experiences to increase intergenerational transmission of the endangered Salishan languages family in addition to traditional mentoring and academic support. The school offers a K-6 grade curriculum and plans to offer a secondary education.

==== Spokane area private secondary schools ====
School name	Type	Established	Enrollment	Notes
Gonzaga Preparatory School	Roman Catholic	1887	860	Grades 9-12, NCEA
Palisades Christian Academy	Seventh-day Adventist	1934	215	Grades PK-10
Upper Columbia Academy	Seventh-day Adventist	1945	272	Grades 9-12, Boarding school
Northwest Christian School	Christian, Non-denominational	1949	642	Grades PK-12
Saint George's School	Secular	1955	371	Grades K-12, IB World School, Cognia accreditation, NAIS
Saint Michael's Academy	Traditionalist Catholic	1968	131	Grades PK-12, Day school, Boarding school
Valley Christian School	Christian, Non-denominational	1974	297	Grades PK-12, ASCI
Faith Baptist Academy	Baptist	1985	128	Grades K-12
The Oaks Academy	Christian, Non-denominational	1996	309	Grades K-12, ACCS
Summit Christian Academy	Baptist	2006	130	Grades K-12, offers Seal of Biliteracy certificate for Russian language proficiency, Cognia accreditation, ASCI

Note:

- This is not an exhaustive list. This is a selective list that intends to include private schools that provide instruction in part or fully for the high school grade levels 9-12 that are in the Spokane metropolitan area (Spokane County).
- Enrollment figures as of April 2021.

== Colleges and universities ==
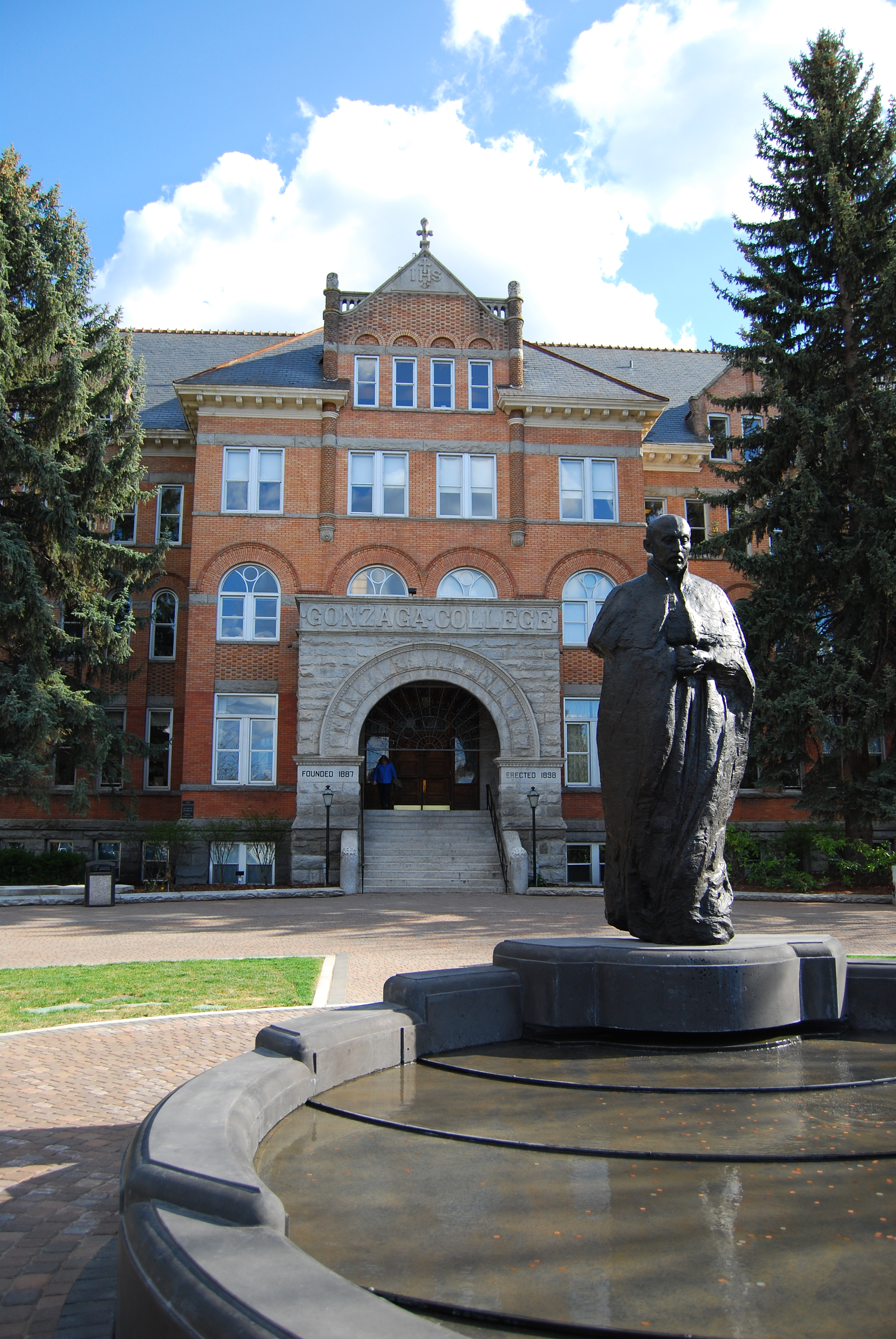
The administration building at Gonzaga University

Higher education institutions in Spokane include the private universities Gonzaga and Whitworth, and the public Community Colleges of Spokane system (Spokane Community College and Spokane Falls Community College) as well as a variety of local branch campuses and technical institutes.

The Community Colleges of Spokane operate Spokane Community College (SCC), Spokane Falls Community College (SFCC), and the Institute for Extended Learning, which coordinates rural outreach, business and community training, adult literacy services, and Spokane County Head Start/ECEAP/Early Head Start. Spokane Community College began operations on September 16, 1963, on the site of the Spokane Technical and Vocational School (established in 1953) at Mission and Greene. During a period of growth, Spokane Community College built a second campus on Fort George Wright Drive (now Spokane Falls Community College), which the board of trustees decided to separate in 1970, creating two distinct entities. Both SCC and SFCC offer four-year bachelor of applied science degrees, SFCC in applied management and cybersecurity and SCC in respiratory therapy. As of 2020, the Community Colleges of Spokane serves approximately 20,000 students a year and offers over 120 degree programs.

Gonzaga University and Law School were founded by the Italian-born priest Joseph Cataldo and the Jesuits in 1887. Gonzaga offers 43 undergraduate degree programs, 26 master's degree programs, a doctoral program in educational leadership, and a Juris Doctor. Gonzaga is one of three schools that offer a Juris Doctor degree in the state of Washington. The school has a total enrollment of about 7,700.

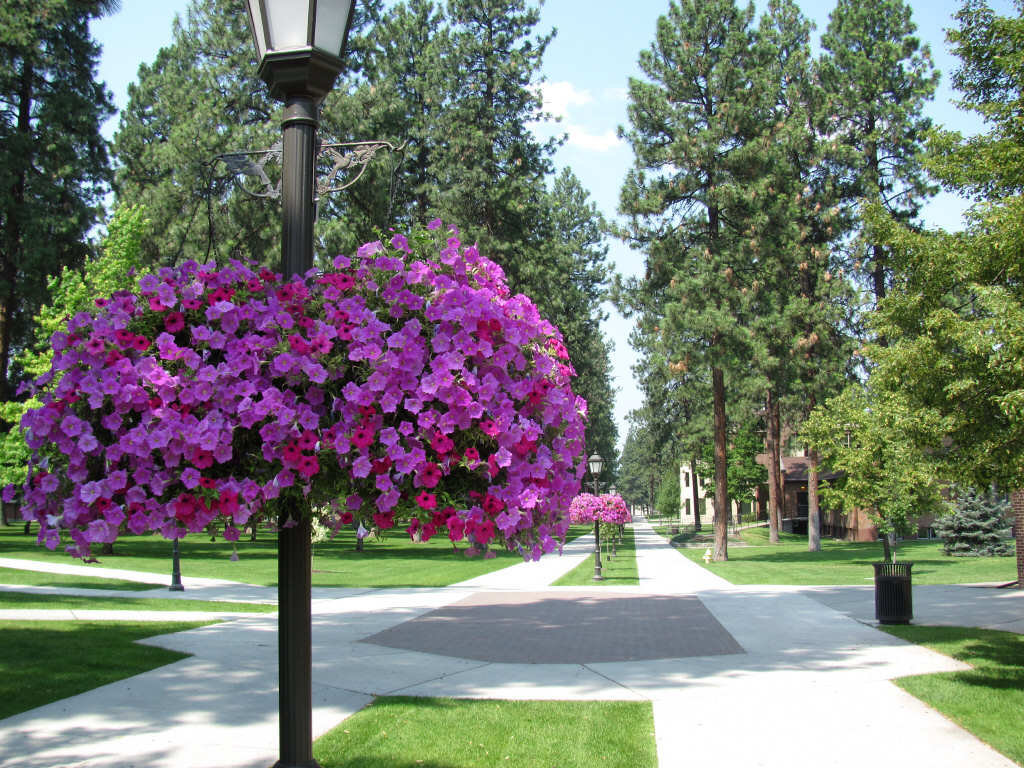
The Hello Walk at Whitworth University

Whitworth was founded in Tacoma, Washington in 1890 and moved to its present location in 1914 following a generous land donation by railroad magnate Jay P. Graves and $100,000 in support from the community. The move alleviated persistent financial difficulties owing to competition with the College of Puget Sound and Pacific Lutheran Academy which were also located in Tacoma. It is affiliated with the Presbyterian Church and had 2,500 students studying in 53 different undergraduate and degree programs as of 2011.

A variety of regional universities located elsewhere in the Inland Northwest have operations in Spokane's University District. The University District is the site of Washington State University Spokane (formerly the Riverpoint Campus); WSU Spokane is WSU's health sciences campus and houses the school's College of Nursing, College of Pharmacy, and Elson S. Floyd College of Medicine. Washington State University is Washington's land grant university with its flagship campus located 65 miles (105 km) south in Pullman. WSU Spokane shares the University District on the east end of downtown Spokane with some programs of Eastern Washington University (EWU), a regional comprehensive university with its main campus located 15 miles (24 km) southwest of Spokane in nearby Cheney.

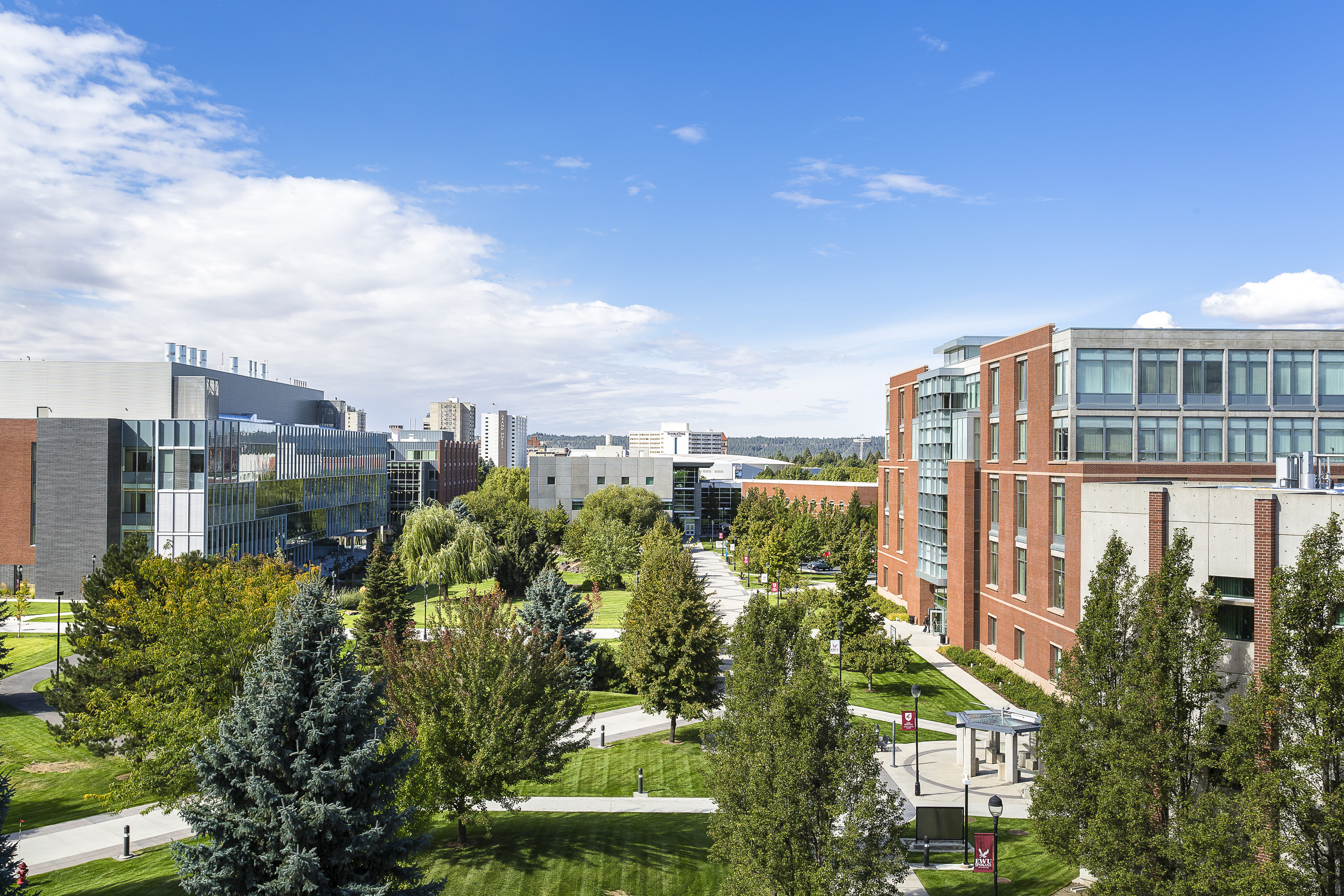
The WSU Health Sciences Spokane campus, located in the University District

The University District serves as WSU Spokane's center for advanced graduate and professional studies and research in the health sciences and health professions. WSU Spokane programs focus on the health sciences, educational administration, and criminal justice. Among its research centers is the WSU Sleep and Performance Research Center, that does controlled laboratory studies of sleep, wake, and work and the consequences of fatigue. A consortium of organizations and WSU operate the Spokane Teaching Health Center, a clinic where the medical residents and WSU students work in collaborative teams to serve low-income community members in need. The campus also has a Veterinary Specialty Teaching Clinic.

The University of Washington's Schools of Medicine and Dentistry had first-year and second-year medical students and first-year dental students at the Riverpoint Campus in partnership with both WSU and EWU as part of their WWAMI (medical) and RIDE (dental) programs, however the WWAMI relationship with WSU ended after WSU College of Medicine was created following the repeal of a law that disallowed a second public medical school in the state. The University of Washington has continued its medical education in Spokane by developing a relationship with Gonzaga. The University District is also home to Innovate Washington (formerly Sirti), a Washington state economic development agency that accelerates the development and growth of innovative technology companies.

Other schools in Spokane include the Inland Northwest Culinary Academy, Spokane Art School, and Great Northern University. The Inland Northwest Culinary Academy at Spokane Community College is an American Culinary Federation accredited program for training professional chefs. Great Northern University is a Christian school established in 2018 on the site of a vacated Moody Bible Institute branch campus which offers seven bachelor's degree programs which include: biblical and theological studies, communication, leadership studies, youth and family ministry, intercultural studies, linguistics and TESOL (Teaching English to Speakers of Other Languages).

=== Spokane area colleges and universities ===
Institution	Type	Established	Enrollment	Notes
Eastern Washington University	Public	1882	12,633	
Gonzaga University	Private, Catholic	1887	7,563	Law School
Whitworth University	Private, Presbyterian	1890	2,776	
Community Colleges of Spokane	Public	1963	26,402	SCC and SFCC
University of Washington	Public	1971	60	WWAMI program in partnership with Gonzaga University
Washington State University Spokane	Public	1989	1,685	Health sciences branch campus: Nursing school, Medical school, College of Pharmacy

Note: Enrollment figures include full-time and part-time undergraduate students and graduate students; the Niche website shows undergraduate and graduate enrollment numbers on different tabs on the institution's profile. Enrollment figures as of April 2021.

== Defunct institutions ==
Defunct institutions that were located in or near Spokane include Spokane University, Spokane Art Center, Spokane College, Spokane Junior College, and a campus of the University of Phoenix and ITT Tech, the People to People Student Ambassador Program, and MEAD Alternative High School.
