= Hambly =

Hambly is a surname. Notable people with the surname include:

- Barbara Hambly (born 1951), American novelist and screenwriter of fantasy, science fiction, mystery, and historical fiction
- Barbara Hambly (field hockey) (born 1958), former English field hockey player, captained the British squad at the 1988 Summer Olympics
- Brian Hambly (1938–2008), Australian rugby league player, a representative forward for the Australia national team 1959–1965
- Charles Wesley Hambly (1863–1942), drover and political figure in Ontario
- Edmund Hambly (1942–1995), British structural engineer
- Gary Hambly (born 1956), Australian former professional rugby league footballer
- Kevin Hambly (born 1973), American volleyball coach at the University of Illinois at Urbana-Champaign
- Thomas Hambly Ross (1886–1956), Canadian politician
- Tim Hambly (born 1983), American professional ice hockey defenceman

== See also ==
- Hambly Arena, ice hockey arena in Oshawa, Ontario, Canada
- Hamble (disambiguation)
- Hamblen
- Hambley (surname)
- Hamblin (disambiguation)
