= WSU Health Sciences Spokane campus =

Coordinates: 47°39′41.68″N 117°24′20.56″W

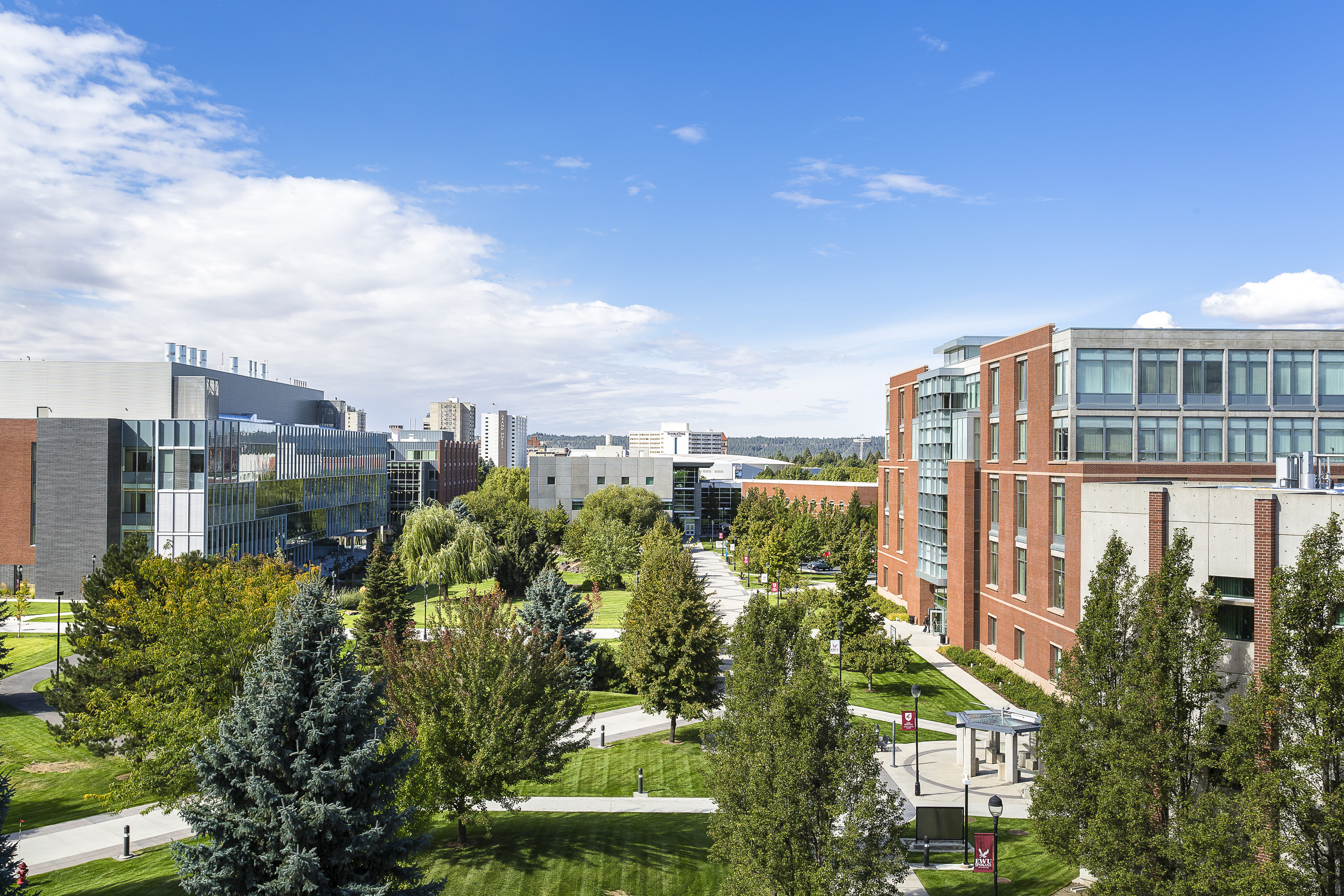
- WSU Health Sciences Spokane campus in 2015, looking west toward Downtown Spokane
- Former names: Riverpoint Campus (mid-2000s–2015); Riverpoint Higher Education Park (1990-mid 2000s)
- Type: Higher education campus
- Established: 1989
- Affiliations: Washington State University Spokane
- Chancellor: Daryll DeWald
- President: Kirk Schulz
- Students: 1625
- Location: Spokane, Washington, United States
- Campus: 48 acres (19 ha)
- Colors: Crimson, grey, and white
- Website: spokane.wsu.edu

The WSU Health Sciences Spokane campus, (formerly the Riverpoint Campus, and originally, the Riverpoint Higher Education Park) is an urban 48-acre (19 ha), multi-institutional higher education campus in Spokane, Washington. The campus was established in 1990 by the Joint Center for Higher Education (JCHE) and has been owned and operated by Washington State University since 1998. It is located within Spokane's University District just east of Downtown Spokane, along the southern bank of the Spokane River across from Gonzaga University.

Through intensive growth over the last 20 years, Washington State University Spokane has become the primary occupant of the now-eponymously named campus. However, the campus, which was originally developed as the Riverpoint Higher Education Park in the early 1990s by the state-created Joint Center for Higher Education (JCHE), has been shared between a number of institutions over the years, primarily, Washington State University Spokane and Eastern Washington University Spokane.

== History ==
The site of the campus is a former brownfield site that was once occupied by rail lines and a waste incubator.

On April 23, 1988, Washington State Governor Booth Gardner signed an appropriation that allocated $800,000 for purchasing land east of Downtown Spokane for the eventual development of a higher education campus. That land would be acquired two years in 1990, officially establishing the campus. Its first building, for the Spokane Intercollegiate Research and Technology Institute (SIRTI), would open on October 21, 1994.

In 1998, the Washington State Legislature passed a bill, signed into law by then-Washington State Governor Gary Locke on April 3, 1998, that transferred full management responsibilities of the Riverpoint Higher Education Park to Washington State University.

In 2015, in an effort to improve the branding of the WSU Spokane campus and its designation as that university's health sciences campus, the decision was made to phase out the Riverpoint Campus name. Other institutions that share the campus with WSU Spokane, including Eastern Washington University and Whitworth University, also followed suit. Moving forward, all the institutions who call the campus home would be referred to by their institutional and program names only.

== Location ==
The WSU Health Sciences Spokane campus sits within Spokane's University District between Gonzaga University and the South University District. The campus is generally bounded by the Spokane River to the north and east, Martin Luther King Jr Way and the BNSF Railway tracks to the south, and Pine Street to the west. Privately owned development dots the perimeter of the campus, as well as exists within the campus, making these boundaries approximate. Major roadways that run through the campus include Spokane Falls Boulevard and Riverpoint Boulevard.

Gonzaga University is located across the Spokane River and is connected to the campus by two bridges. The pedestrian and bicycle-only Don Kardong Bridge, which is located toward the WSU Health Science campus' northeastern corner carries Spokane River Centennial Trail over the river toward Gonzaga, entering that campus next to the building that houses that university's law school. The Centennial Trail also runs along and can be accessed by points along the WSU Health Sciences campus' northern border. A second bridge along the Health Sciences campus' eastern border carries pedestrian and automobile traffic along Spokane Falls Boulevard to the southern border of Gonzaga, near its baseball stadium, the Washington Trust Field and Patterson Baseball Complex.

The South University District area can be accessed by the University District Gateway Bridge, which carries pedestrians and bicyclists across Martin Luther King Jr Way and the BNSF railway tracks along the south edge of the campus.

== Buildings ==
Buildings on the WSU Health Sciences Spokane campus. Many were newly constructed for educational purposes, but several other buildings were acquired or leased over the years. They include:

Name	Built/Acquired	Notes
Health Education & Research Building	1994	First building constructed on the campus by the JCHE. Formerly known as the Innovate Washington Building and the SIRTI Building. Housed the Riverpoint Academy for one year in 2012.
Eastern Washington University Center	1996	Second building to be constructed on the campus by the JCHE. Formerly known as the Phase One Classroom Building. Owned by WSU and leased out to EWU for exclusive use.
Health Sciences Building	2002	
Spokane Academic Center	2006	Houses the WSU Health Sciences Library, providing access to WSU students. Houses WSU Spokane's administration.
Pharmaceutical & Biomedical Sciences Building	2013	
Nursing Building	2009	
Spokane Teaching Health Clinic	2016	
Ignite NW/WSU Innovation Center	2005	Formerly known as the Spokane Technology Center
Center for Clinical Research & Simulation	1938 (built)	Formerly known as the South Campus Facility
Jensen-Byrd Building	1909 (built); 2001 (acquired by WSU Foundation); 2004 (transferred to Washington State University)	
Veterinary Specialty Teaching Clinic	1946 (built)	
Riverfront Office Park	1997	Privately owned. Portions of first floor occupied by Whitworth University
Riverbank Building	1929	Privately owned office building. Located in the middle of the Health Sciences campus, but is not leased by any academic institutions. Originally called the Kemp & Herbert Building.
Riverpoint One Office Building	1988	Owned by the Community Colleges of Spokane and houses its district administration.

=== Jensen-Byrd Building ===
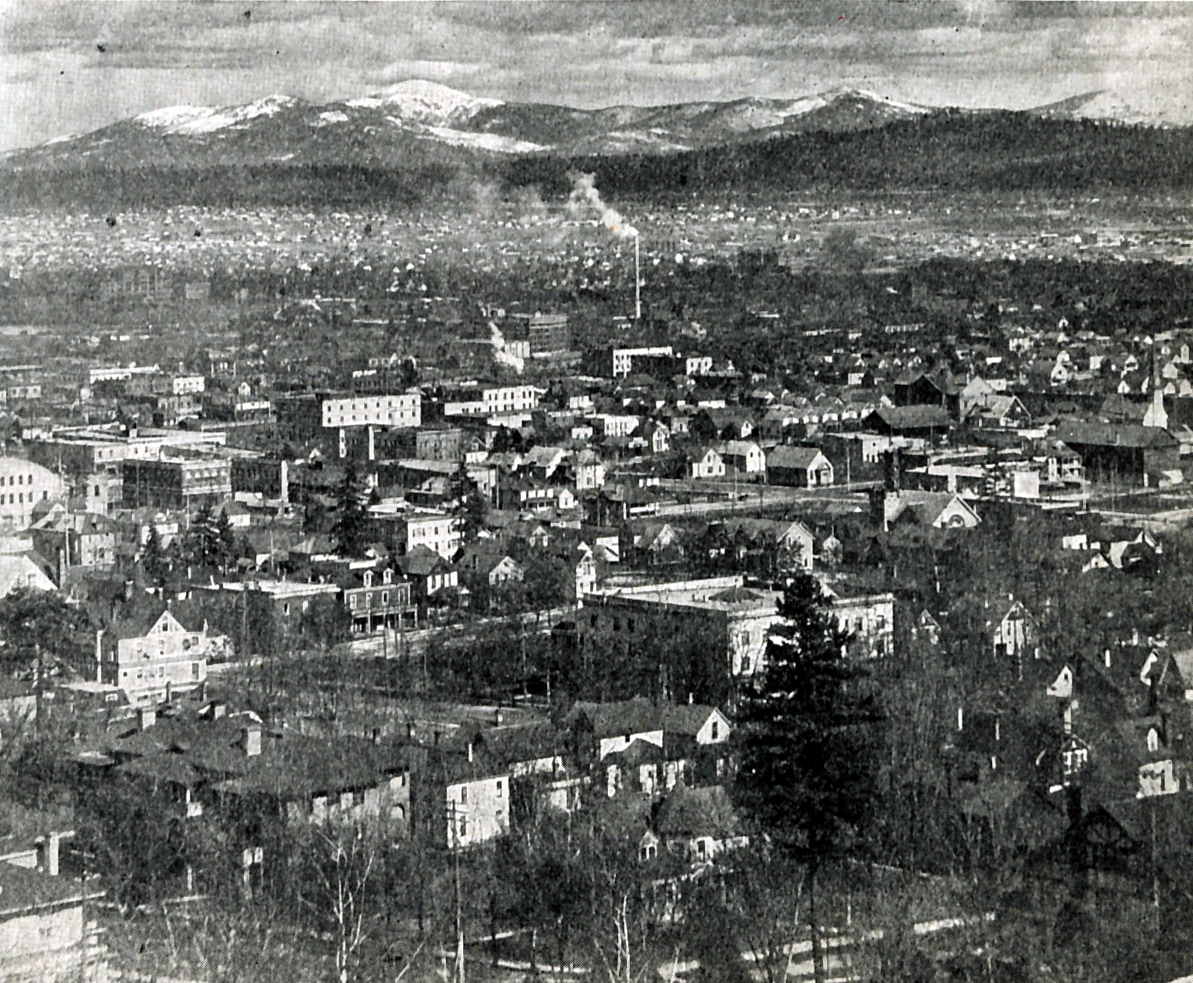
The Jensen-Byrd Warehouse as pictured in 1914, located just below and to the left of the smoke stack in the center of the image

Sitting in the middle of the WSU Health Sciences Spokane campus is the Jensen-Byrd Building, also known as the Jensen-Byrd Warehouse. The six-story, 200,000 square-foot historic brick warehouse was originally constructed in 1909 and has changed hands a number of times over its history. It was acquired by the WSU Foundation in 2001 and leased back to its prior owner for use until its transfer to Washington State University in 2004 with plans to eventually make the building, or its land, a key part of the campus. Due to its history and its location in the heart of a rapidly developing campus, the role and future of the building on the campus has been the source of much controversy and seen a number redevelopment proposals for the last couple decades.

The warehouse was designed by Spokane architect Albert Held for the Marshall-Wells Hardware Company, which was based in Duluth, Minnesota.

At the time of its completion, it was one of the largest warehouses in Spokane, and as of today remains the second largest warehouse in Spokane County and one of the largest historic buildings in downtown Spokane.

Several additions were made to the building over the years, including its eastern annex in 1946 and the Pine Street wing in 1973.

In 1958, the building landed in the hands of the Jensen-Byrd Co., now known as Jensen Distribution Services, after its acquisition of the Spokane branch of Marshall Wells

==== Redevelopment proposals and historic preservation efforts ====
As of 2017, the building's future is awaiting a revised master plan from the university. While still standing, it has remained mostly empty and unused since its acquisition by Washington State University in the early 2000s. However, it has been used occasionally in recent years, hosting some small events and having its basement serve as a filming location for several scenes in the SyFy series Z Nation.

== Shared-use entities ==
The WSU Health Sciences Spokane campus, despite owned and operated by WSU Spokane since 1998, and renamed after it in 2015, has, throughout its entire history and still does to this day, shared the campus with a number of various academic institutions, business incubators, and business accelerators from across the Spokane area and State of Washington. Beyond just being co-located on the same campus, the entities have also had a history of collaborating academically as well as administratively and financially.

=== Current ===
==== Eastern Washington University ====
Eastern Washington University operates EWU Spokane, which houses portions of EWU's College of Health Science and Public Health, from the WSU Health Sciences Spokane campus. The university shares space in the Health Sciences Building, where it collaborates with WSU Spokane and houses its programs in dental hygiene, physical and occupational therapy, and speech and hearing disorders. Operations were previously based out of the EWU Center, the second building constructed on the campus, which opened in 1996 as the Phase I Classroom building. The building was also previously shared with WSU Spokane, but EWU took over the building for exclusive use in 2014. As of August 2023, this building is now named the Medicine Building, and is for the exclusive use of Washington State University and its Elson S. Floyd College of Medicine.

Eastern Washington University will expand its Spokane presence in the fall of 2020 by occupying the newly built Catalyst Building, the first zero-energy building in Spokane as well as the first office building to be constructed out of cross-laminated timber in the State of Washington. While close to the WSU Spokane Health Sciences campus, the Catalyst is not located on the campus. Several programs will be relocated into the building from its main campus in nearby Cheney, Washington.

==== Washington State University Spokane ====
Washington State University operates its Health Sciences Spokane campus operates from the now-eponymously named campus, housing three colleges, its College of Nursing, College of Pharmacy and Pharmaceutical Sciences, and Elson S. Floyd College of Medicine.

==== Ignite Northwest ====
Ignite Northwest is a local business accelerator that was founded in 2015 in the wake of the defunding and shutdown of the state-funded Innovate Washington. Its functions can be seen as similar to that of the former Innovate Washington agency, however, as an accelerator as opposed to incubator, it is involved in a later stage of a business start-up timeline. It occupies space in the Ignite Northwest Building, which is the Spokane Technology Center that was originally constructed by SIRTI. WSU Spokane is one of Ignite Northwest's partners and has had a history of partnering with Ignite Northwest on grant funding.

=== Former ===
==== Riverpoint Academy ====
Riverpoint Academy, is a STEM-focused high school established by the Mead School District in 2012. The school occupied space in the then-named Innovate Washington Building, originally the SIRTI Building, which was the first building to be built on the campus, and remained there for one year, before outgrowing the space and relocating to a new location within school district's attendance boundaries north of Spokane in the fall of 2013. The school's original location near Downtown Spokane on a higher education campus was intended to provide several new opportunities for learning. These included networking and mentoring opportunities through Greater Spokane Incorporated (GSI), a local economic-development organization, as well as collaboration opportunities with the university community. Access to university libraries was provided for Riverpoint Academy students, and several college-level classes were also taught by EWU Spokane staff.

==== Innovate Washington ====
Innovate Washington was a state-funded business incubator whose roots partially began as the Spokane Intercollegiate Research & Technology Institute (SIRTI). Innovate Washington was created in 2011 by a merger between SIRTI and its Seattle-based counterpart, Washington Technology Center. Innovate Washington was defunded by the Washington State Legislature in February 2014, and shut down in June of that year. Some of it operations were assumed by the non-profit Innovate Washington Foundation. One of its buildings, the original SIRTI Building, was turned over to Washington State University while the non-profit organization assumed ownership of the Spokane Technology Center. The foundation was later relaunched as Ignite Northwest and still occupies space on the WSU Health Sciences Spokane campus.

==== Spokane Intercollegiate Research & Technology Institute (SIRTI) ====
SIRTI was a state-funded business incubator and predecessor state agency to Innovate Washington. It created in 1994 under the administration the Joint Center for Higher Education (JCHE), the entity which had originally developed the WSU Health Sciences Spokane campus. In 1998, when the JCHE was dissolved, SIRTI was spun off into a separate state agency and given ownership the building it occupied, along with 2.5 acres (1.0 ha) of land, while ownership of the rest of the then-named Riverpoint Higher Education Park campus was transferred over to WSU Spokane.

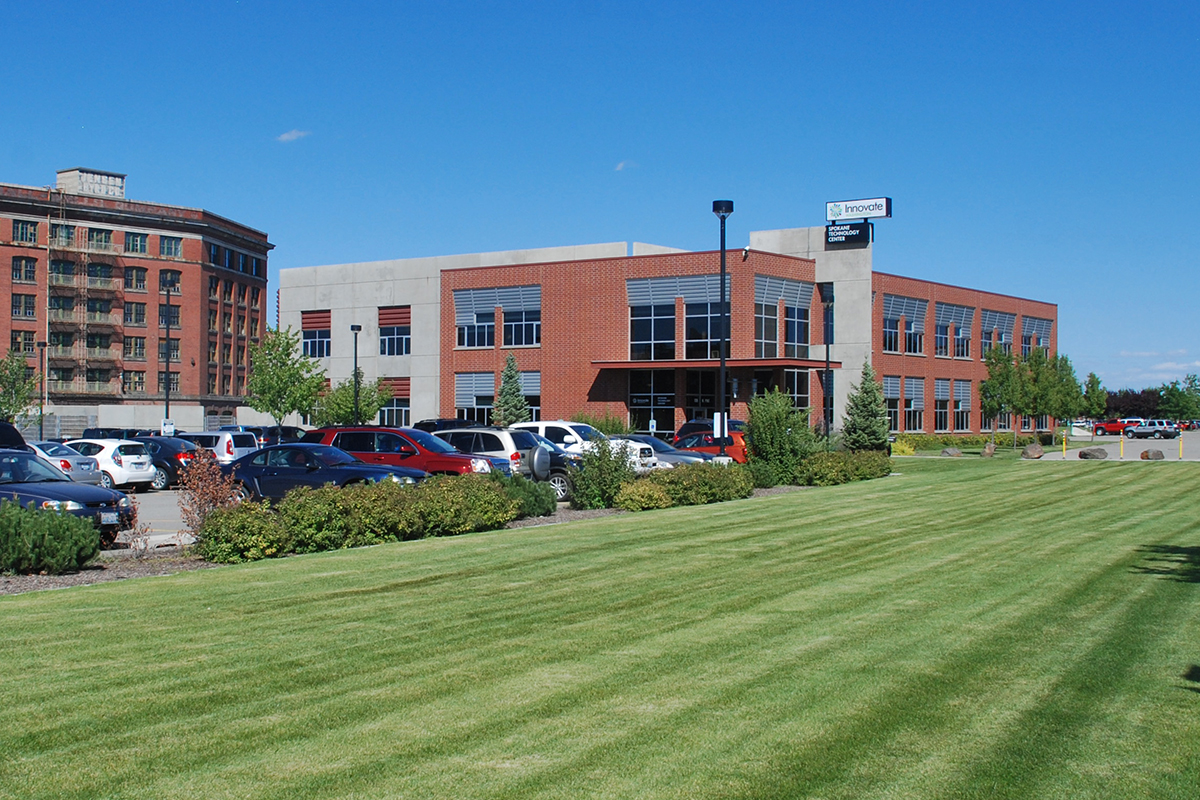
The Spokane Technology Center pictured in 2013 under the Innovate Washington banner. The building remains in use today by Ignite Northwest and WSU Spokane

SIRTI broke ground on a second building on the campus, which was named the Spokane Technology Center, in March 2005, on a parcel of land that it acquired from WSU Spokane for $850,000. The building was designed to have about 28,000 to 29,000 square feet of leasable area, 12,000 of which was dedicated as wet lab space designed primarily for pharmaceutical or biotechnology research in hopes of supporting the goal of making the WSU Health Sciences campus a biotech-health care center. In June 2011, a bill was signed by then-Washington State Governor Christine Gregoire that abolished SIRTI and its Seattle-based Washington Technology Center counterpart. The two were merged into a new state agency to be called Innovate Washington, with the change taking effect on August 1, 2011.
