= St. Thomas More High School (disambiguation) =

St. Thomas More High School may refer to various Catholic high schools named for Thomas More:

- St Thomas More High School in Westcliff-on-Sea, Essex, England
- St. Thomas More High School in the Roman Catholic Archdiocese of Philadelphia
- St. Thomas More Catholic High School (Louisiana)
- St. Thomas More High School (South Dakota)
- Saint Thomas More High School (Milwaukee)
- St. Thomas More Catholic High School in Spokane, Washington
- St. Thomas More School (Connecticut)
- St. Thomas More High School (Champaign, Illinois)
- St. Thomas More Catholic Secondary School in Hamilton, Ontario
