= Hamblyn =

Hamblyn is a surname. Notable people with the surname include:

- Richard Hamblyn (born 1965), British environmental writer and historian
- Bernadette Hamblyn, fictional character in New Zealand soap opera Shortland Street

== See also ==
- Hamblen
- Hamblin (surname)
