= Jon Snyder =

Former Member of the Spokane City Council District 2
- In office 2009–2016
- Succeeded by: Breean Beggs

Personal details
- Born: March 14, 1969 (age 57)
- Party: Democrat
- Spouse: Heidi Arbogast

Jon Snyder is a former member of the Spokane City Council. He was first elected in 2009. Snyder chaired the Public Safety Committee for the City of Spokane.

== Education and early life ==
Snyder is a graduate of Lewis and Clark High School in Spokane. He graduated from Evergreen State College with an emphasis in Media Studies. While at Evergreen State College in 1990 he directed the filming of a live concert of Nirvana that is now in the permanent collection of the EMP Museum in Seattle.

== Politics ==
=== City Council ===
Snyder ran for City Council seat of District 2, Position 2 in 2009 in a 6 way primary with City Council incumbent Mike Allen. Snyder won the 2009 primary with 31.49% of the vote; sending him to general to face off with Mike Allen. He went on to win the 2009 general election against Allen with 53.65% of the vote.

Since the start of his first term, Snyder has been an advocate for road traffic safety, including taking the lead on passing a Complete streets ordinance in the City of Spokane. He was appointed to the Washington Traffic Safety Commission in 2012. As part of his Council work, Snyder was also elected Chair of Aging and Long Term care of Eastern Washington in 2013 In addition to this, Snyder was a major supporter of the Office of the Ombudsman.

=== 2013 Election ===
Snyder won the Primary election for Spokane City Council District 2 on August 6, 2013, with 55.94% of the vote against challengers John Ahern and LaVerne Biel.

He went on to defeat John Ahern in the general election for the Spokane City Council District 2 race by a vote of 64.39%.

=== Resignation ===
Snyder resigned in December 2015 to take a job with Washington Governor Jay Inslee as Outdoor Recreation & Economic Development Senior Policy Advisor.

== Business and other activities ==
Snyder moved to San Francisco in late 1992 and began working with Maverick Magazine Consulting and several other various jobs. After moving to Denver in 1996 he began working on Star Wars and Star Trek licensed magazines and was a contributing editor to the magazine "Sci-Fi Universe" for 5 years.

Jon was an author, editor-in-chief and contributor for the Star Wars fan magazine Star Wars Insider as well as the Star Wars Kids magazine published by Scholastic. In addition, Snyder was also managing editor of the "Star Trek Communicator", released by the Official Star Trek Fan Club.

Snyder is a co-founder and one of the first Board Chairs of the Spokane-based non-profit radio station KYRS Thin Air Community Radio.

In 2014, he founded a monthly regional outdoor recreation magazine called Out There Monthly and was publisher and editor-in-chief with a team of contributing freelance writers and photographers. Out There Monthly received three first places for Excellence in Journalism Awards from the Society of Professional Journalists. Snyder also co-founded of the Go Green Directory, a guide to sustainable and Eco-friendly living in the Inland Northwest. The directory won the first Children of the Sun Spokane Peace Prize in 2008. In June 2013, Snyder sold the magazine to new publishers, Derrick and Shallan Knowles. This husband-and-wife team now co-publish the magazine, with Derrick as editor-in-chief and Shallan as visual editor, and have built off Snyder's vision to greatly grow the magazine. The magazine underwent a name change in 2018, and it's now known as Out There Outdoors.
