= Washington State University Spokane =

Campus of Washington State University in Spokane, Washington, U.S.

- Type: Public
- Established: 1989
- Parent institution: Washington State University
- Chancellor: Daryll DeWald
- President: Elizabeth R. Cantwell
- Students: 1,685 (fall 2019)
- Undergraduates: 534 (fall 2019)
- Postgraduates: 1,151 (fall 2019)
- Location: Spokane, Washington, United States; 47°39′41.00″N 117°24′20.90″W
- Campus: Urban Total 48 acres (19 ha)
- Colors: Crimson & Gray
- Nickname: Cougars
- Website: spokane.wsu.edu

Washington State University Spokane (WSU Spokane), branded as WSU Health Sciences Spokane, is a campus of Washington State University located in Spokane, Washington, United States. It was established in 1989 and, as of 2010, is designated as the university's health science campus. The urban campus is housed on the 48-acre (19 ha) multi-institutional WSU Health Sciences Spokane campus, formerly known as the Riverpoint Campus, in Spokane's University District just east of Downtown Spokane.

As of Fall 2019, enrollment on the WSU Spokane campus was 1,685 students, consisting of undergraduate, graduate, and professional students, and the campus also employs 781 faculty and staff.

== History ==
=== Beginnings ===
In 1987, the Washington State Higher Education Coordinating Board (HECB), the predecessor to the Washington Student Achievement Council, released its first master plan which concluded that existing upper division and graduate higher education programs in the State of Washington, particularly in its urban areas, were inadequate for the state's population. The conclusion was drawn based on the low rates of enrollment and completion of baccalaureate programs for Washington residents as compared to other states around the country.

=== Establishment ===
In 1989, responding to the HECB's conclusion, the Washington State Legislature along with then-Washington State Governor Booth Gardner, established five branch campuses within growing cities across Washington (Bothell, Tacoma, Vancouver, the Tri-Cities and Spokane). The new campuses were distributed between the state's two main public research institutions with the University of Washington establishing UW Bothell and UW Tacoma, and Washington State University establishing WSU Vancouver, WSU Tri-Cities, and WSU Spokane.

The newly formed campuses, including WSU Spokane, were charged with a mission to expand access to upper division and graduate higher education and to foster regional development. The upper division focus (which has since evolved as some of the campuses now offer four-year degrees) was meant to complement Washington's relatively large and geographically distributed community college system and to meet local labor market demand for higher education. Meanwhile, placing the new campuses under operation by Washington's research universities was meant to promote local economic development.

While the other four campuses were established to focus on arts, sciences, and applied master's degree programs, WSU Spokane's focus was oriented toward health sciences, engineering, and architecture at the graduate level.

=== Growth ===
By 2017, WSU Spokane, and the four other campuses that were established alongside it, had grown to the point where the Washington State Legislature decided to remove the "branch campus" designation from all five campuses in a nearly unanimous vote (91-6 in the state house and 48–0 in the state senate). The bill would be signed by Washington State Governor Jay Inslee shortly after. The change was in nomenclature only and was made to symbolize the growth of higher education in the state in the roughly 25 years since the campuses were originally established, and to recognize that each of the campuses had matured and formed their own identities. It did not alter the governance and funding structure of the state's public research universities. Therefore, the campuses, including WSU Spokane, still report to their main campuses and do not operate with full autonomy and separate governance like affiliated universities in other state university systems in the United States (such as the University of California and University of Texas systems) do.

=== Refocus as a health sciences campus ===
On September 3, 2010, to recognize the university's long-term vision to advance WSU Spokane in the health sciences arena and recent parallel efforts to launch a medical school in Spokane, the WSU Board of Regents designated WSU Spokane as the university's health science campus.

In recent years WSU Spokane has expanded significantly. Thanks to intense community support, legislative funding to build a new facility for the pharmacy and medical sciences programs was approved, and private funding of second year medical education was secured. These actions prompted the College of Pharmacy to move in its entirety to the Spokane campus in 2013 and the Elson S. Floyd College of Medicine to be created in 2014. Another recent effort was the establishment of a consortium of Empire Health Foundation, Providence Health Care and WSU Spokane that successfully applied for federal teaching health center funding for six new medical residency slots, with the possibility of another 12 or more if funding is continued. The effort moved responsibility of nearly all of the medical residences in Eastern Washington to the consortium's Spokane Teaching Health Center. A clinic for the residents and WSU students working in teams to serve low-income community members was finished in early 2016.

=== Establishing a medical school ===
In May 2021, WSU Spokane graduated its first class of medical students.

== Campus ==
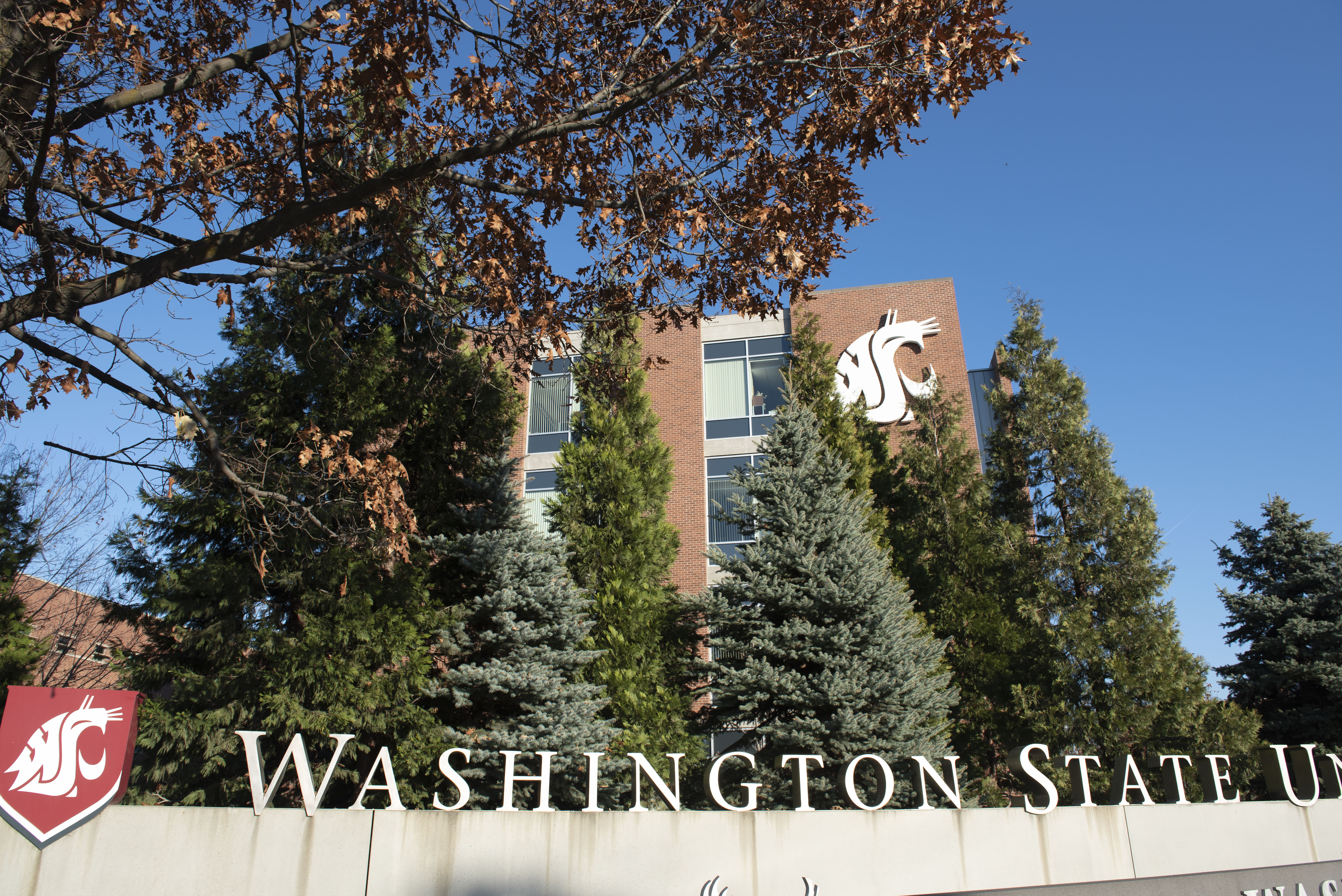
The Spokane Falls Blvd. campus entrance

In its first few years of existence, WSU Spokane operated out of leased space in Downtown Spokane. However, in 1996, with the opening of a building called "Phase One" at the then-named Riverpoint Higher Education Park, WSU Spokane began to occupy the campus that it calls home today. The 48 acres (19 ha) urban campus, which was originally established by the Joint Center for Higher Education (JCHE), is located in Spokane's University District, just east of downtown. Before its development, the campus was a brownfield site with rail lines and a waste incubator.

The JCHE first acquired land for the current-day campus in 1990 and, by 1992, released a master plan to develop the multi-institutional campus with five to seven buildings that WSU and EWU could eventually move into and fully transition out of its leased space in Downtown. The JCHE continued to own, operate, and develop the campus until its dissolution in 1998. At this point, full ownership and operations of the campus were transferred over to Washington State University.

Still embracing the JCHE's original vision for the campus to be collaborative and multi-institutional, WSU Spokane continues to share its campus with several other academic institutions.

=== Public Transit ===
The WSU Spokane campus has direct access to the following Spokane Transit Authority bus routes (updated as of the July 2023 STA service change).

| Route | Termini | | | Service operation and notes | Streets traveled |
|---|---|---|---|---|---|
| 1; City Line | Browne's Addition | ↔ | Chief Garry Park; Spokane Community College | Bus rapid transit | Cannon St, 4th Ave, Spruce St, Pacific, 1st Ave, Wall St, Main Ave, Pine, Spokane Falls Blvd, Cincinnati, Mission Ave, Riverside Ave, Sprague Ave, 2nd Ave |
| 6; Cheney | University District; Spokane Teaching Health Clinic; Washington State University Spokane | ↔ | Cheney; Eastern Washington University | Regional route | Front, Spokane Falls, Browne/Division, Riverside/Sprague, STA Plaza, Jefferson, Jefferson Park & Ride, I-90, West Plains Transit Center, WA 904, Betz, 6th, Elm, Washington, K Street Transit Station |
| 14; South Adams/Napa | Chief Gary Park; Napa St. & Mission Ave. | ↔ | South Hill; 14th Ave. & Adams St. | Regular route | Wall, 6th Ave., Bernard, 5th Ave., Division, 7th Ave., McClellan, 8th Ave., Rockwood Blvd. Cowley, Sherman |
| 25; Division | Downtown Spokane; STA Plaza at Bay 6 | ↔ | Fairwood; Hastings Park & Ride | Frequent route | Division/Ruby couplet |

== Academics ==
WSU Spokane houses the university's three human health sciences-related colleges: the College of Nursing, College of Pharmacy and Pharmaceutical Sciences, and the Elson S. Floyd College of Medicine

It offers programs in Medical Sciences, Pharmaceutical Sciences, Nursing, Health Policy and Administration, Speech and Hearing Sciences, Nutrition and Exercise Physiology, Education and Criminal Justice. Research occurs in the areas of sleep and performance, cancer, mental health, molecular biosciences, and substance abuse.
