= Riverpoint Academy =

Location
- 11008 N Newport Hwy; Spokane, Washington 99218; United States; 47.7577°N 117.3930°W

Information
- School district: Mead S.D. (#354)
- Principal: Moleena Harris
- Faculty: 19
- Teaching staff: 20.33 (FTE)
- Grades: 9–12
- Enrollment: 170 (2017-18)
- Student to teacher ratio: 8.36
- Website: riverpoint.mead354.org

Riverpoint Academy (RA) was a two-year high school operated by the Mead School District, Spokane, Washington, United States. Riverpoint was a STEM School, with an enrollment of about 200 students.

The school was established in 2012 with 75 students on the then-named Riverpoint Campus (its namesake) near Downtown Spokane with the vision of harnessing the synergies created with the university community, including access to university libraries, some college-level classes taught by university faculty, and mentors from the local business community.

The school occupied space in the then-named Innovate Washington Building, originally the SIRTI Building, and remained there for one year, before outgrowing the space and relocating in the fall of 2013.

On May 7, 2019, the Mead School Board approved $11.3 million in budget cuts resulting in a temporary two-year suspension, and soon thereafter, a permanent shutdown of Riverpoint Academy.
