= Lewis and Clark High School =

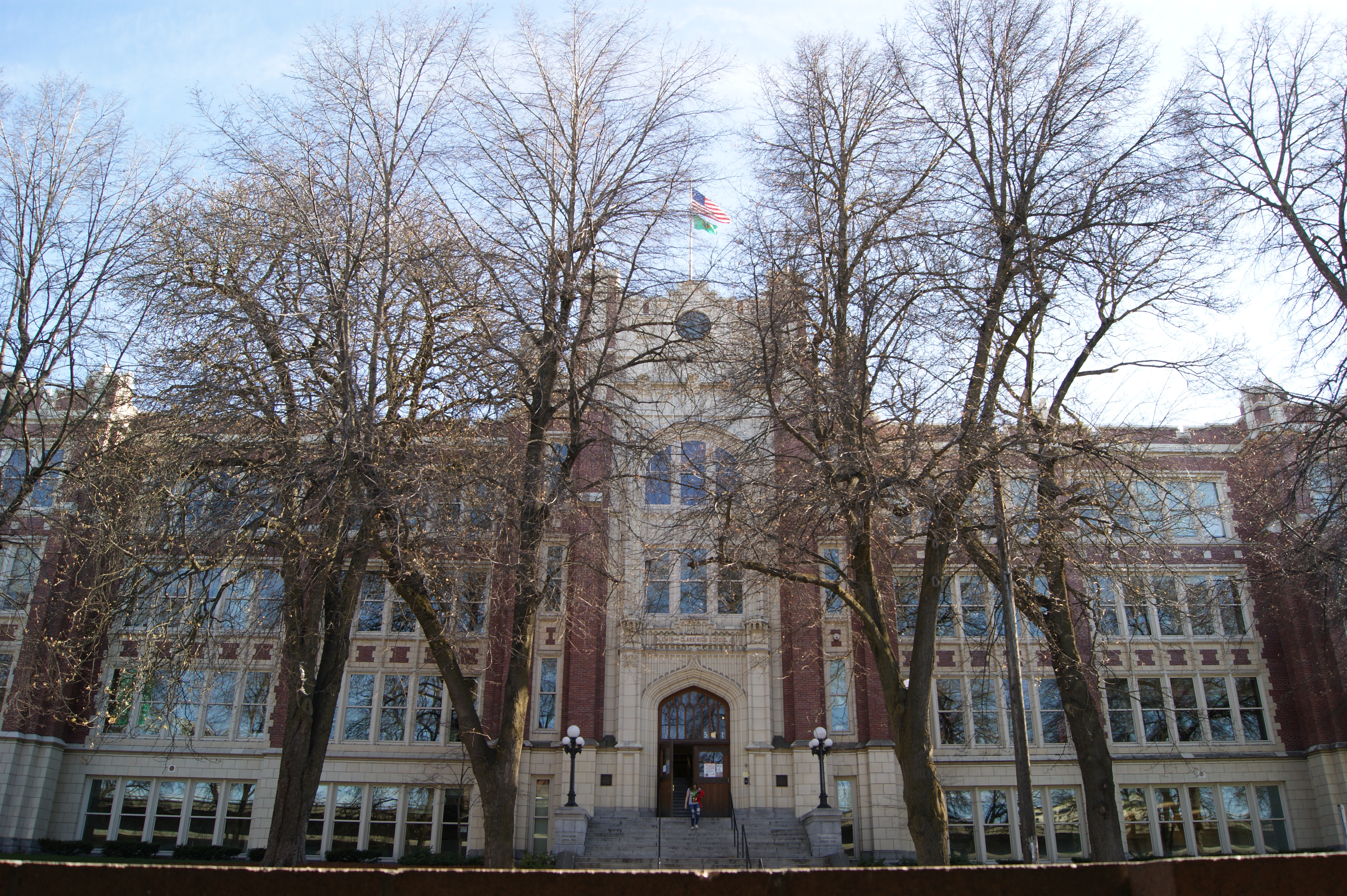
- North entrance on 4th Avenue

Location
- 521 W. 4th Ave. Spokane, Washington 99204; United States; 47.652°N 117.42°W

Information
- Former names: Central School, Spokane High School, South Central High School
- Type: Public High School
- Motto: Fides, Noscentia, Virtus (Faith, Knowledge, Virtue)
- Established: 1883
- School district: Spokane Public Schools
- Superintendent: Adam Swinyard
- NCES School ID: 530825001388
- Principal: Ivan Corley
- Teaching staff: 88.60 (FTE)
- Grades: 9–12
- Enrollment: 1,672 (2023-2024)
- Student to teacher ratio: 18.87
- Campus type: Urban
- Colors: Orange and Black
- Fight song: LC Fight Song
- Athletics: WIAA Class 4A
- Athletics conference: Greater Spokane League
- Team name: Tigers
- Rivals: Joel E. Ferris High School
- Newspaper: 𝘛𝘪𝘨𝘦𝘳 𝘛𝘢𝘭𝘬; 𝘓𝘊 𝘛𝘝 𝘕𝘦𝘸𝘴𝘳𝘰𝘰𝘮; 𝘛𝘩𝘦 𝘛𝘪𝘨𝘦𝘳 𝘛𝘳𝘪𝘣𝘶𝘯𝘦
- Yearbook: The Tiger
- Website: www.spokaneschools.org/lewisclark

- Lewis and Clark High School
- U.S. National Register of Historic Places
- Location within Spokane riverfront area
- Built: 1912
- Architect: Loren L. Rand
- Architectural style: Late Gothic Revival
- NRHP reference No.: 01001288
- Added to NRHP: November 30, 2001

Lewis and Clark High School is a four-year public secondary school in Spokane, Washington, United States. Opened in 1912, it is located at 521 W. Fourth Ave. in the Cliff/Cannon neighborhood of downtown Spokane, bounded by I-90 to the north and MultiCare Deaconess Hospital to the west. It replaced South Central High School, destroyed by fire in 1910, and was named for the two leaders of the Corps of Discovery.

== History and facilities ==
=== 1883–1908 ===
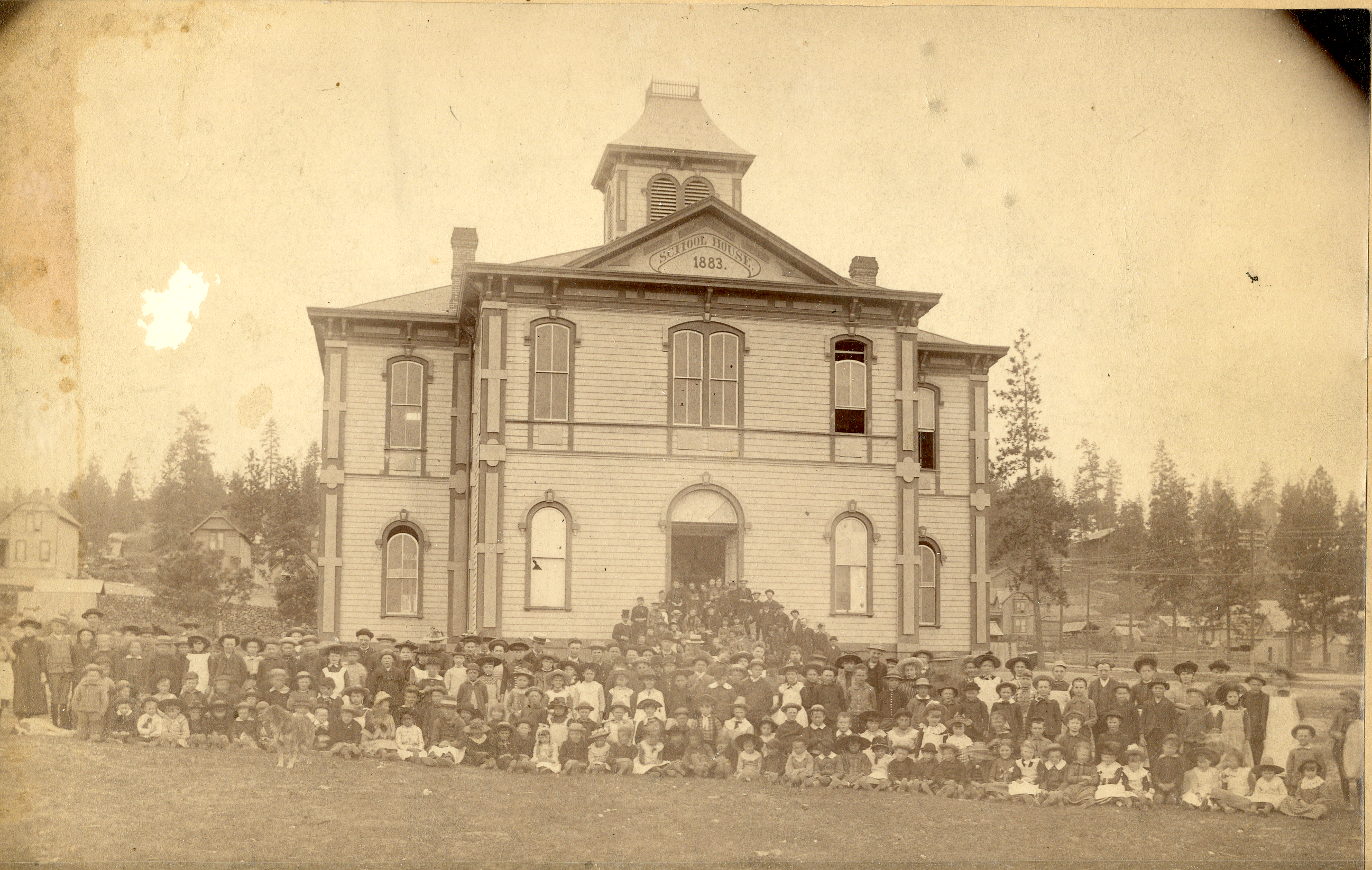
Central School between 1883 and 1891

Central School, a two-story wooden building, was the first school located on the southwest block at Fourth and Stevens. A four-room school, it opened 143 years ago in October 1883. In 1890, citizens voted bonds to build a new high school and four elementary schools. The old Central school building was moved to the corner of Fifth and Bernard and became a private school. The new high school, first known as "Spokane High School," was constructed on the Fourth and Stevens site and opened in 1891. By 1906, the influx of immigrants and subsequent boom in Spokane's population created a need for a second high school. North Central High School was built and opened in 1908 to serve the students on the north side the river. Spokane High School became known as South Central High School.

=== South Central Fire ===
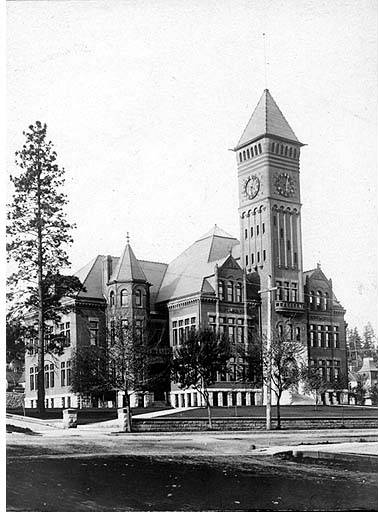
South Central High School, ca. 1910

Fire destroyed South Central High School in 1910, shortly after sunrise on June 21. The blaze destroyed the interior of the school but left the remains of the exterior walls standing. In January 1911, citizens passed a bond issue of $500,000 to pay for replacement of the school. In a ceremony, former President Teddy Roosevelt laid the cornerstone of the school on April 8, 1911. Students attended classes at North Central while work progressed on the new school. Problems in construction and strikes by workers delayed the opening until April 1912. Meanwhile, the Spokane Daily Chronicle encouraged readers to enter a contest to suggest names for the new high school. Richard Hargreaves, the principal of North Central, suggested the names of Lewis and Clark, using one name for each high school, North and South Central. The school board settled for naming the south side school Lewis and Clark High School.

=== Renovation ===
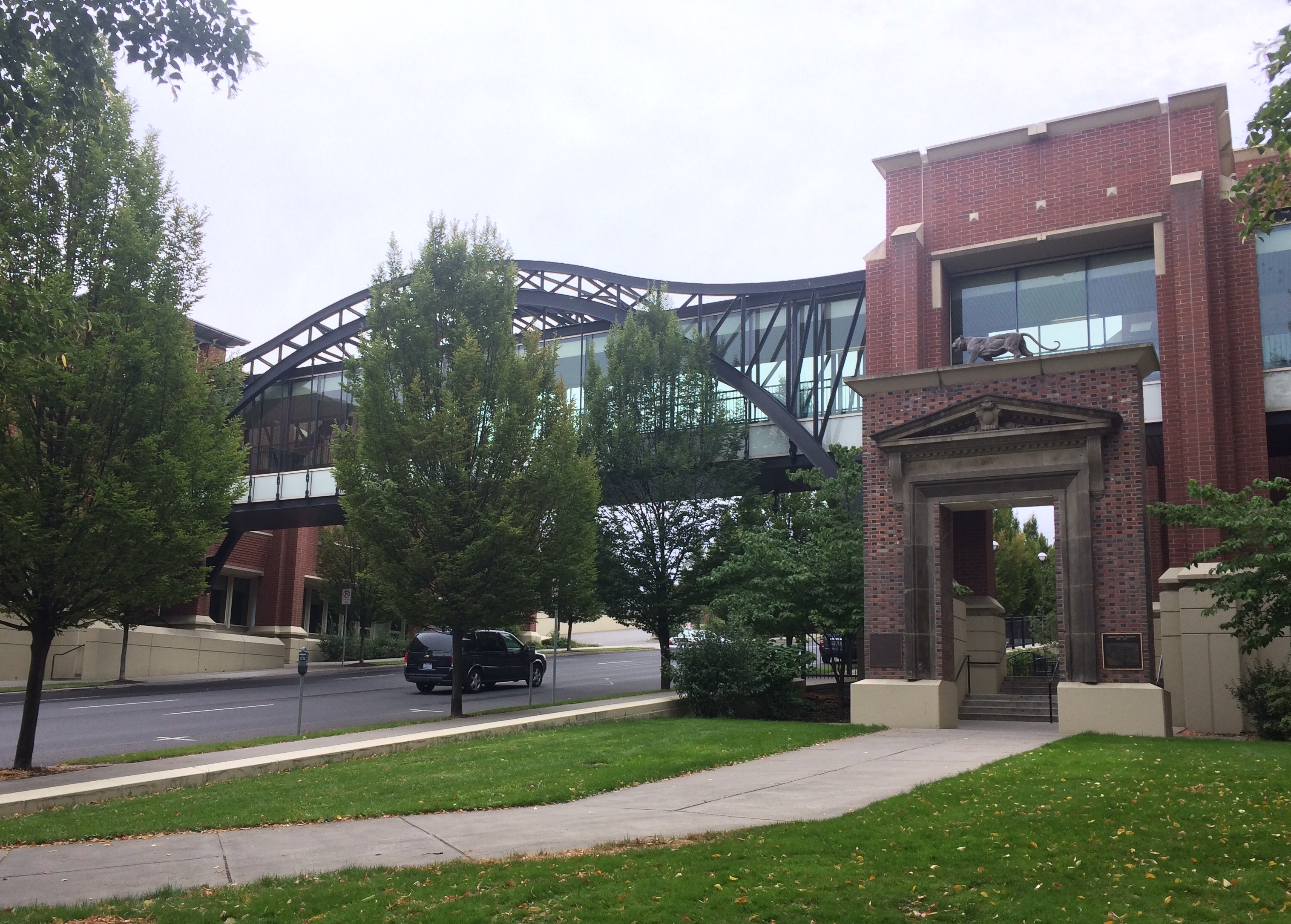
2001 classroom addition and new skybridge to the field house. Historic entry to the former administration building is in the foreground. View is looking southeast with S. Stevens Street visible.

Between 1999 and 2001 the school underwent a major renovation and addition. This included addition of new classrooms to the east side of the school, replacement of the former field house with a new E. L. Hunter Field House, and a skybridge over S. Stevens Street to the east to connect the school building to the new field house. In 2020, a third complex with a commons and cafeteria was added with two floors of classrooms, connected to the west side of the main building.

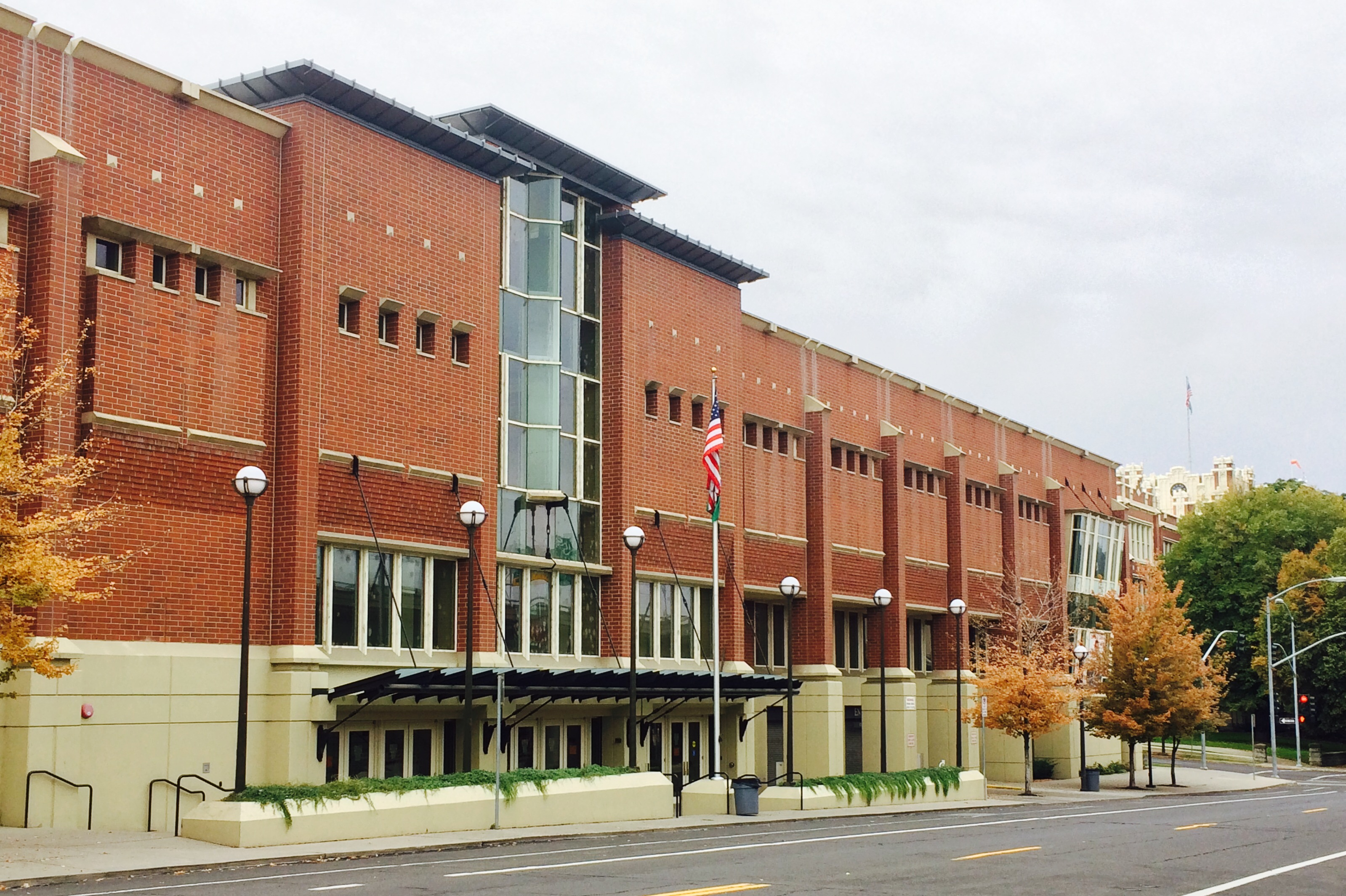
2001 E.L. Hunter Field House to the east of the historic school building just visible at right. The view is looking southwest.

In 2001, the school was added to the United States National Register of Historic Places and The Washington State Department of Archaeology and Historic Places.

=== Expansion ===
In 2019, work began on a $23.4 million addition to the school, adding eight classrooms, a commons area and a cafeteria. Prior to the construction of the cafeteria, students ate lunch in the hallways or would walk to a cluster of nearby fast food restaurants. This expansion was approved under the same bond that allowed for the replacement of Joe Albi Stadium with a smaller multiuse stadium. With the addition of the commons to the building's western side, students were no longer allowed to leave campus during school hours and were confined to the commons building for lunch time.

== Demographics ==
According to NCES (National Center for Education Statistics) public school data for the 2021-2022, and 2022-2023 school years, 1,872 students attended Lewis and Clark, with 498 enrolled as Freshman, 504 Sophomores, 436 Juniors, and 434 Seniors. 51% of the population was male and 40% of the population was female. White students have the biggest ethnic representation at 66.9% with those of two or more races next at 13.1%, Hispanic then follows 9.7%, Asian at 3.2%, African American at 2.7%, Native Hawaiian/ Pacific Islander at 2.3%, American Indian/Alaskan Native at 1.0%. As of the 2023-2024 school year, 31.2% of students were eligible for free lunch, with an additional 6.6% eligible for a price-reduced lunch. The 2022-2023 school year saw a dropout rate of 5.1%, an on-time graduation rate of 92.6%, and extended graduation rate of 2.3

== Athletics ==
Lewis and Clark competes in WIAA Class 4A and is a member of the Greater Spokane League in District Eight.

=== State championships ===
- Boys basketball: 1926, 1944, 1949
- Girls basketball: 2006, 2007, 2008, 2011
- Boys cross country: 1961, 1966, 2017, 2024
- Football: 2007
- Boys golf: 2010
- Girls golf: 2009
- Girls tennis: 2007, 2016
- Boys track and field: 1928, 1929, 1944, 1962
- Volleyball: 1992, 1994, 2008
- Boys wrestling: 1981

== Achievements ==
- Newsweek Magazine named Lewis and Clark High School one of the top 1500 US High Schools in 2009, 2008, 2007, 2006, and 2005.
- Sports Illustrated named Lewis and Clark High School one of the top 25 high school sports programs in the nation, ranking it 12th in 2007–08.

== Notable alumni ==
- Ed Bouchee – former MLB player (Philadelphia Phillies, Chicago Cubs, New York Mets)
- Ed Brandt – former MLB player (Boston Braves, Brooklyn Dodgers, Pittsburgh Pirates)
- Donald Brockett – former Spokane County Prosecuting Attorney
- Jesse Buchanan – tenth president of the University of Idaho (1946–1954)
- Gail Cogdill - Former All-American, Pro-Bowl NFL Tight End, Detroit Lions
- Abe Cohn - former football player for the University of Michigan
- Erik Coleman – former National Football League player
- Paul Dorpat – Washington historian
- Bill Etter – quarterback at the University of Notre Dame, and CFL player.
- Neil Everett (Morfitt) – sportscaster for ESPN
- Julian Guthrie - journalist and author
- Briann January – WNBA basketball player with Indiana Fever
- Carolyn Kizer – poet and Pulitzer Prize winner in 1985; studied with Joseph Campbell
- Tom Kundig – architect
- Dan Lynch – former All-America college football player
- Katherine Merck – first Miss Rodeo America from Washington State
- Patrice Munsel – former opera singer and star with the Metropolitan Opera
- Joanne Nail – actress
- Craig T. Nelson – actor, Coach, Parenthood
- Scott O'Grady – former U.S. Air Force fighter pilot, famous for service during the Bosnian war
- Carol Ohmart – actress and model
- Matt Piedmont – Emmy winning writer, producer, director, and former Saturday Night Live staff writer
- Jamie Redman – US National Rowing Team
- Katelan Redmon – WNBA basketball player with New York Liberty
- Dario Romero – former CFL player
- Irwin Rose – Nobel Prize winner in chemistry in 2004.
- Eva Silverstein – physicist
- Tom Sneva – former race car driver, Indianapolis 500 winner in 1983.
- Jon Snyder – former member of Spokane City Council and founder of Out There Monthly Magazine.
- Jack Spring – former MLB player (Philadelphia Phillies, Boston Red Sox, Washington Senators, Los Angeles Angels, St. Louis Cardinals, Chicago Cubs, Cleveland Indians)

== See also ==
- Education in Spokane, Washington
- National Register of Historic Places listings in Spokane County, Washington
