= North Central High School (Spokane, Washington) =

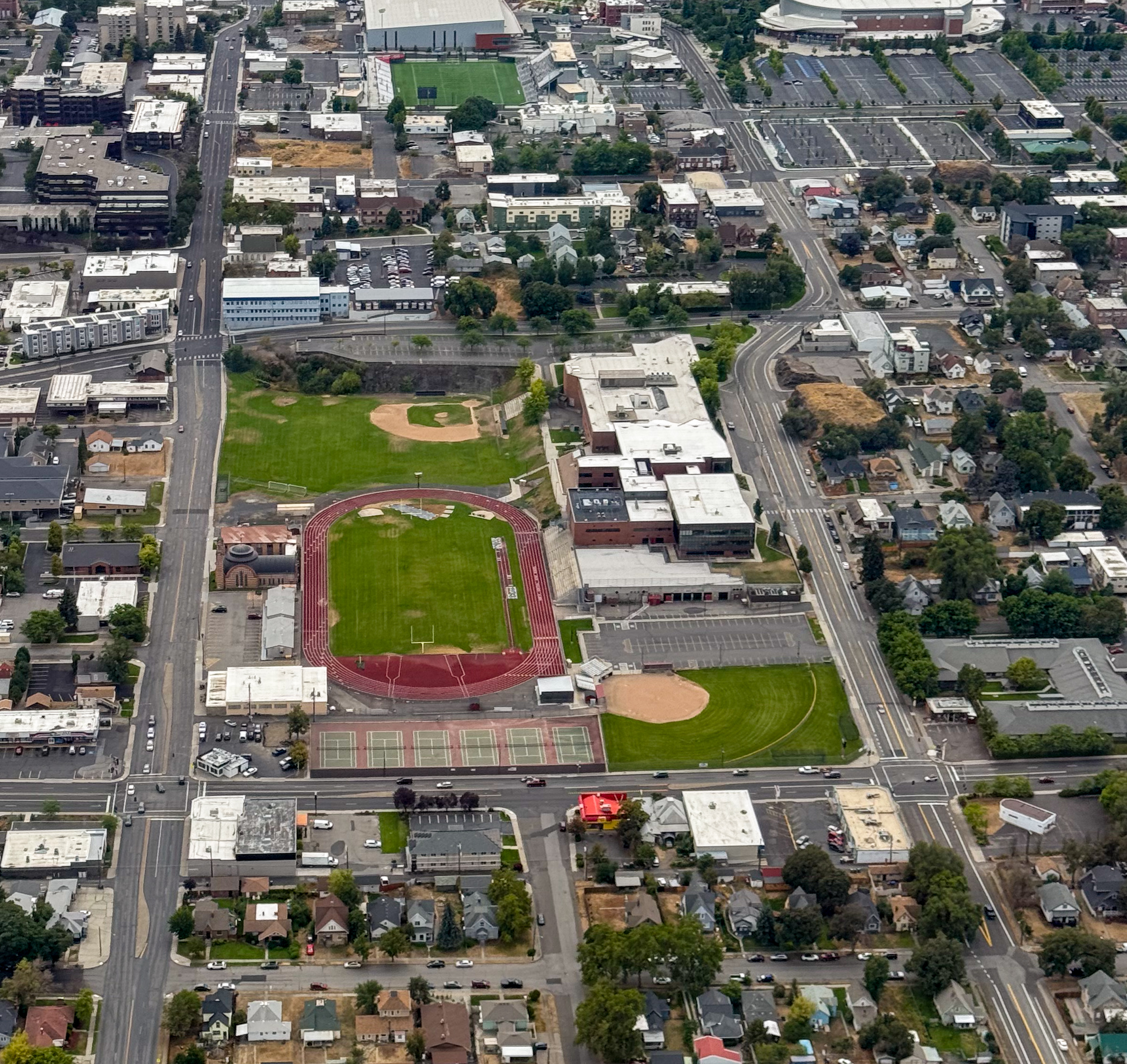
- Aerial photo of the school

Location
- 1600 N. Howard St. Spokane, Washington 99205; United States; 47.6725°N 117.4196°W

Information
- Type: Public
- Motto: We are Family. Always.
- Established: 1908 (1981)
- School district: Spokane Public Schools
- Superintendent: Adam Swinyard
- NCES School ID: 530825001399
- Principal: Tami McCracken
- Teaching staff: 87.82 (FTE)
- Grades: 9-12th in addition to I.S.T program for 6th, 7th, and 8th graders.
- Enrollment: 1,624 (2023–2024)
- Student to teacher ratio: 18.49
- Campus: Urban
- Colors: Red & Black
- Fight song: "Oh Red and Black"
- Athletics: WIAA Class 3A
- Athletics conference: Greater Spokane League
- Mascot: Wolfpack
- Elevation: 1,900 ft (580 m) AMSL
- Website: www.spokaneschools.org/o/north-central

North Central High School is a four-year public high school in Spokane, Washington in the Spokane Public Schools District 81. It opened in 1908 as the second high school in the city; the original structure was razed and the new building opened in 1981.

Each year Newsweek magazine ranks the top public high schools in the nation when it comes preparing students for college and life. In 2009, NC ranked 692 in the nation. In 2010, 608th in the nation. In 2011, NC ranked 697th in the nation, 10th in the state of Washington and 1st in Eastern Washington. North Central was home to the 2008 Nike Cross Nationals champions.

== History ==
North Central High School opened in September 1908 with only half of one wing completed and 12 classrooms available for the 200 newly enrolled students. Notable events in the school's early history included an outbreak of scarlet fever, which required every student to be examined twice a week by a throat specialist. The school also received visits from William Jennings Bryan, who spoke on the importance of public speaking, and Booker T. Washington, who spoke about his experiences as a formerly enslaved boy and the founding of a college in Tuskegee, Alabama.

Following a fire at South Central High School in June 1910, students from that school temporarily attended North Central High School until the building was rebuilt. The new school on the former South Central High School site was renamed Lewis and Clark High School and opened in 1912. South Central High School had originally opened in 1891 and was known as “Spokane High School” until North Central High School opened in 1908.

== Groovy Shoes ==
In 1991, NC and its rival school, Shadle Park, began a spirit competition named Groovy Shoes. The first theme NC chose for its Groovy Shoes T-shirts was "Shadle Park on the Spot" and featured the "Spot" from 7-Up commercials that year. While the two basketball teams battle it out on the court, the more important competition takes place in the stands annually at the Spokane Arena. Using school symbols and colors, art students at each school created a "groovy" looking shoe. The pair of shoes became the Groovy Shoes. Possession of the shoes goes to the winner of the spirit competition. There is a week long build up where students decorate the school hallways according to the year's theme in a competition between the classes. The spirit week before the big game, gets students hyped to be a part of the event. During the con, which takes place the day of Groovy Shoes, students learn all of the cheers, meet the characters of the years theme (past themes have included Star Wars, Circus, Alice in Groovyland, Code Red, Once Upon a Shoe, Spooky Shoes, and Drive Shoes), and get excited for the game. Groovy Shoes has become one of NC's largest events of the year.

== The Doll Shop ==
NC is notable for its theater department since their productions consist of student made sets, student designed lights, professional tickets and programs, and dedicated ushers. Every three years, North Central holds the tradition of putting on a massive, student written musical called "The Doll Shop". This tradition was started in 1930. It was such a huge success, that it continued to be produced every other year until 1958. "The Doll Shop" was revived in 1984. Since "The Doll Shop" is student written, the story is different every three years; for instance, in 1999, it was about the last Doll Shop of the 20th Century. In 2002, it was a sequel to the 1999 show, about the first Doll Shop 21st Century. In 2005, it was a spoof of the current reality TV shows. In 2008, it was North Central's 100th birthday, so "The Doll Shop" was one of the centennial events. In 2011, the show took on a deeper meaning; it was a reflection on the current society. The show itself was about the old classic dolls like Raggedy Ann and Raggedy Andy AKA Bandy, that were being taken out by the newer action figure dolls led by the evil new Barbie, Electronica. "Audience members would come up to me and tell me that they were amazed with the sheer size of the cast", said an usher for the 2011 "The Doll Shop" in our interview, and its no exaggeration. "The Doll Shop" cast reaches over 250 students who are all actively performing on the stage in multiple scenes. The 25th production of "The Doll Shop" was in 2017.

== Buildings and layout ==
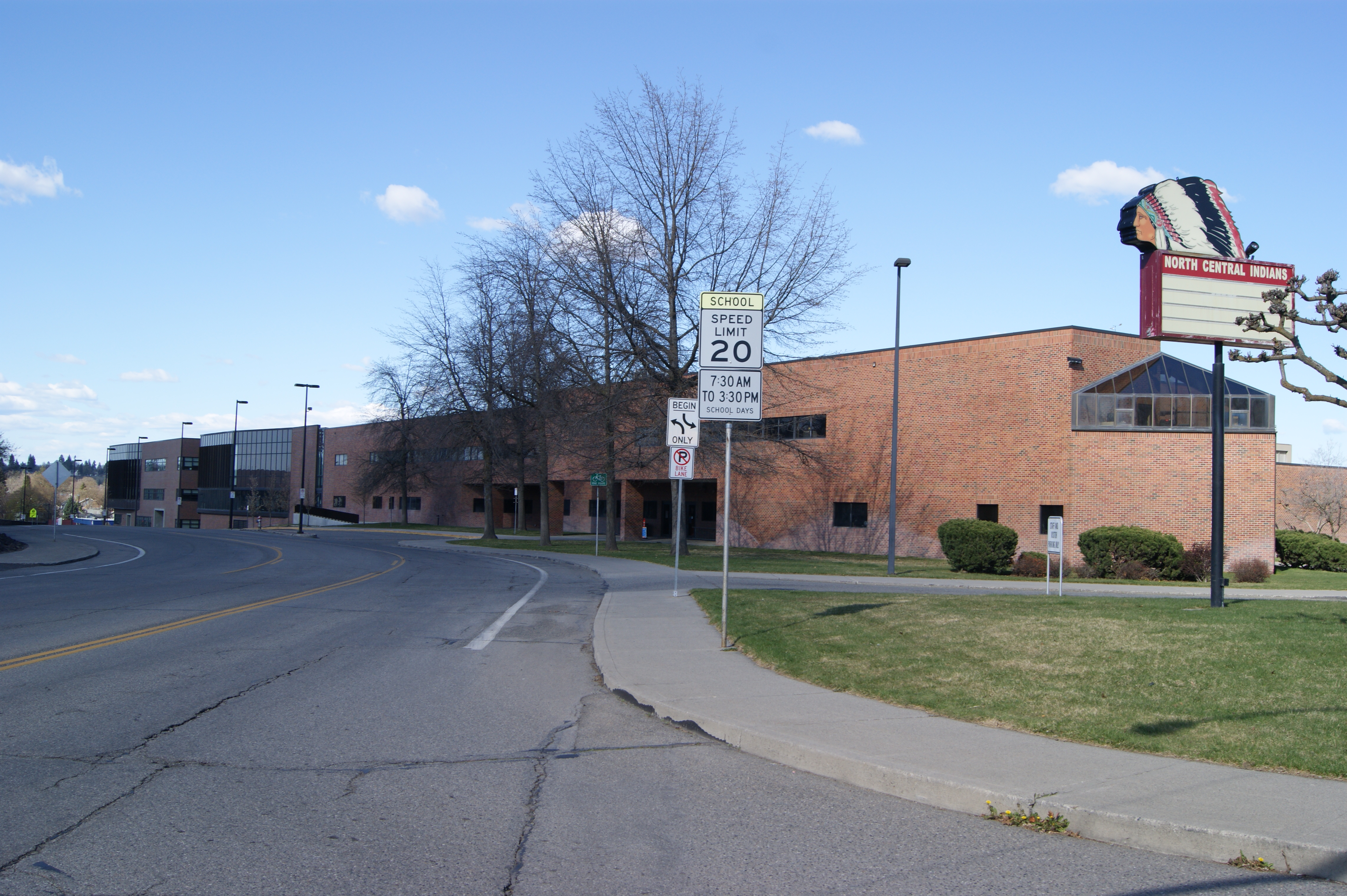
North Central High School fronting Howard Street

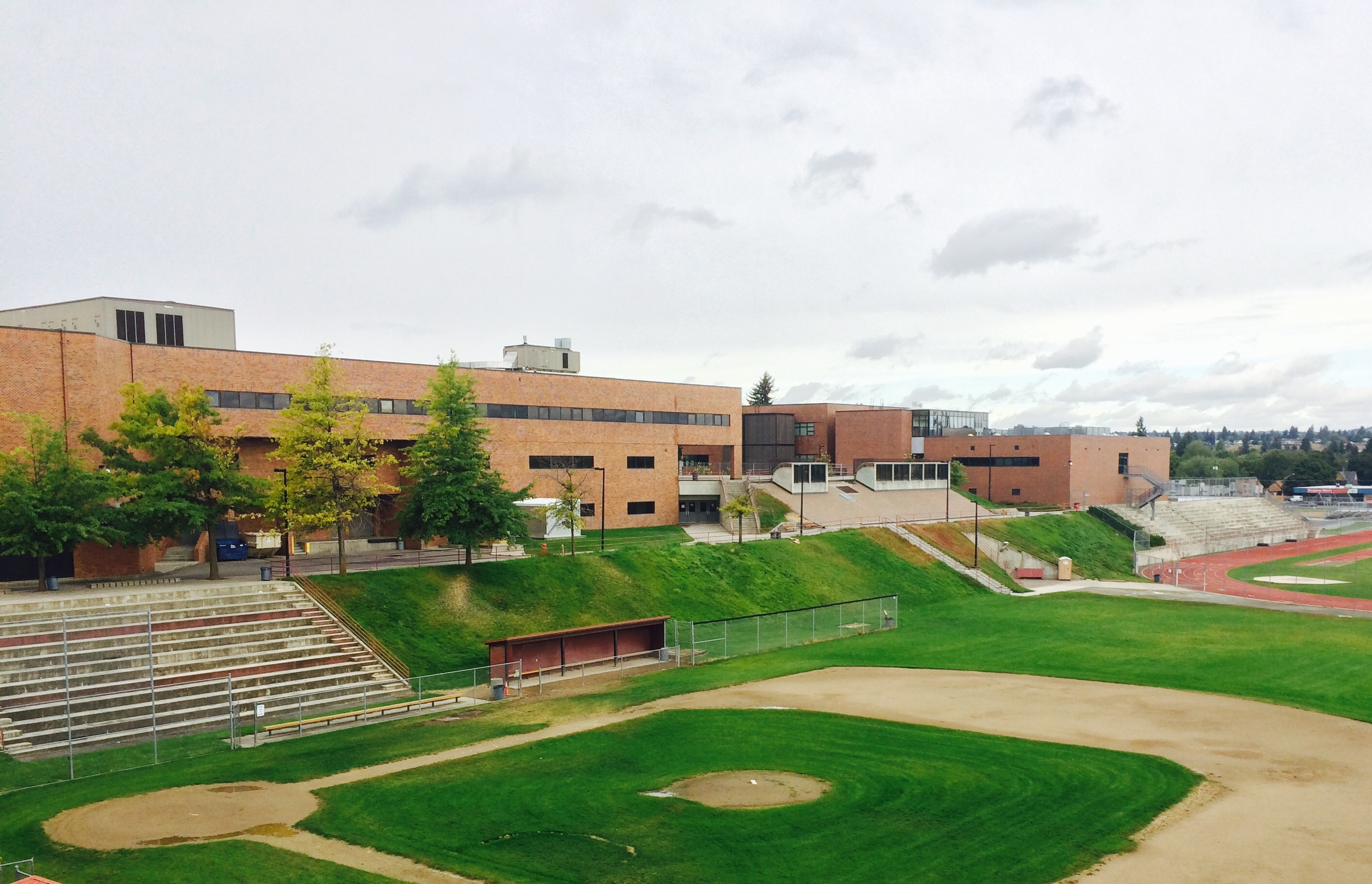
Looking northwest with the athletic fields in the foreground

Located in the north central part of Spokane, NCHS is a multi-story building and a layout on which students sometimes need to walk across the football field to an annex building for some classes. The current building was constructed during 1980–1981, taking the place of the original 1908 NCHS building which was torn down. It has an extensive skylight area where seniors usually eat lunch. The property encompasses over a city block in Spokane, and includes a combined football/track field, baseball and softball fields, and six tennis courts. It is rumored that the school is haunted due to the fact that it was built on an ancient Indian burial ground. A 17.5 million modernization of the commons area and cafeteria was completed in December 2017.

== Institute of Science and Technology (IST) ==
Though the program has been building up over many years, for the 2014–2015 school year, North Central formally opened the Institute of Science and Technology (IST). IST was founded by Randy James, the current director of the institute. James has been teaching at North Central for over 30 years. The institute is housed in a three-story building that is attached to the main high school. There are six biology labs and a third floor lab dedicated to the Institute providing high school students access college-level supplies and machines. Unlike any other high school facility in the city, the new North Central High School Institute of Science and Technology rivals many college lab facilities, and was driven by the District's growing emphasis on studies in science, technology, engineering and math (STEM). The three-story, 40,000 square foot building contains six biology labs in addition to a third-floor lab for the institute, which offers high school students advanced courses in biomedical technology, biological solutions and genomic research. The design is purposefully reminiscent of university facilities and takes advantage of territorial views and substantial day-lighting in the labs. Careful consideration was given to the relationship between this facility and the existing school through the use of masonry, the entry treatment and other details.

=== Middle School Expansion Model ===
Building on the original IST program for high school students, North Central opened an expansion of the institute to seventh and eight graders. According to the Spokane Public Schools the middle school program is lottery determined. The guide notes,

"Students will remain within the IST and within their own student groups for all of their classes and will be able to choose from a menu of electives including computer applications, drama and music in 7th grade, and engineering, world languages, drama, and music in 8th grade. At the end of their two-year middle experience at NCHS, students can remain at NCHS, attend a neighborhood high school, or opt into other option programs in the same way any other student in our district can. But they will do so with a dramatic "leg up" in terms of STEM preparation, college readiness, and advisory support.

Middle school students in the IST program have access to six accelerated classes (accelerated English, accelerated math, advanced science, accelerated history, PE, and one elective, and at the end of their two years, they can choose to remain at North Central or move to a neighboring high school.

The IST program has been expanded to include sixth graders as of the 2022-2023 school year. Sixth graders in the program have electives such as computer applications, music, and art.

== Sports ==
North Central competes in WIAA Class 3A and is a member of the Greater Spokane League in District Eight.

=== State championships ===
- Boys basketball: 1928, 1930, 1948
- Boys cross country: 1977, 2006, 2007, 2008, 2009, 2010, 2011, 2012, 2013, 2014, 2015, 2016
- Girls cross country: 2001, 2017, 2018, 2019
- Boys track and field: 2008, 2009, 2010, 2011
- Girls track and field: 2006
- Volleyball: 1995
- Boys wrestling: 2014

== Demographics ==
Of North Central's 1,610 students (2006-07 school year), 63% are white, 26% are black, 3% are Hispanic, 4% are Asian, 4% American Indian, and 2% are unknown/not provided. 43% of students qualify for free lunches or reduced price lunches.

== Notable alumni ==
- Dyan Cannon, Oscar-nominated actress from Tacoma, WA. She attended North Central for the 9th grade before moving to Seattle with her family.
- Bing Crosby, singer attended NCHS until he could afford tuition at Gonzaga Prep
- Rod Funseth, professional golfer
- Jack Geraghty, Mayor of Spokane, from 1993 to 1996.
- Bruce Alan Grandstaff, platoon sergeant who died in Vietnam, recipient of the Medal of Honor, has a memorial dedicated to him in the skylight area.
- Jimmy Lake, NFL and collegiate football coach
- Diane Middlebrook, American biographer, poet, and teacher
- George R. Nethercutt, Jr., member of the United States House of Representatives from 1995 to 2005, representing Washington's 5th congressional district.
- Michael C. Ormsby, US Attorney for the Eastern District of Washington
- Justin Lowe Quackenbush, judge on the U.S. District Court for the Eastern District of Washington.
- Ryne Sandberg, Hall of Fame baseball player (North Central's baseball field is named for him.)
- Earl Sheely, former MLB player (Chicago White Sox, Pittsburgh Pirates, Boston Braves)
- Staff Sergeant Ty Carter, US Army Medal of Honor recipient, Battle of Kamdesh at Combat Outpost Keating Afghanistan 2009. He graduated from North Central class of 1998.

== See also ==
- Education in Spokane, Washington
