= Spokane Public Schools =

School district in Washington, U.S.

Address
- 200 North Bernard Street Spokane, Washington, 99201; United States
- Coordinates: 47°39′33″N 117°24′56″W

District information
- Motto: Excellence For Everyone
- Grades: Pre-K through 12
- Established: 1889; 137 years ago
- Superintendent: Dr. Adam Swinyard
- NCES District ID: 5308250
- Affiliations: Washington State Office of Superintendent of Public Instruction, U.S. Department of Education

Students and staff
- Enrollment: 30,464 (2021)
- Student–teacher ratio: 16.85 (2021)
- Colors: Blue; Gold

Other information
- Website: spokaneschools.org

Spokane Public Schools (District No. 81) is a public school district in Spokane County, Washington, and serves the city of Spokane. The district includes oversight and administration of seven high schools, 9 middle schools, and 34 elementary schools. Specialized programming focuses on alternative learning opportunities for highly capable children, as well as those that experience moderate to severe emotional and/or physical disabilities, are homeless, or experiencing the Spokane Public Schools system through the Foreign Exchange Program. Spokane Public Schools also offers Bilingual and Montessori schools.

It includes the vast majority of Spokane, most of Town and Country, and a portion of Spokane Valley.

== Demographics ==
In 2012 the largest groups of students who spoke languages other than English were Russian (530), Marshallese (370), and Spanish (360)-speakers, respectively. In 2006 the school district began receiving large numbers of ethnic Marshallese. The school system created the Marshallese 101 outreach and training program to combat truancy and address issues related to frequent address changes, staying with extended family, and other issues related to Marshallese culture.

== Schools ==
=== High schools ===
- Joel E. Ferris High School
- Lewis and Clark High School
- North Central High School
- John R. Rogers High School
- Shadle Park High School
- NEWTech Skills Center
- The Community School
- On Track Academy

=== Middle schools ===
- Chase Middle School
- Garry Middle School
- Glover Middle School
- Peperzak Middle School
- Sacajawea Middle School
- Salk Middle School
- Shaw Middle School
- Yasuhara Middle School
- Flett Middle School

=== Elementary schools ===
- Adams Elementary School
- Arlington Elementary School
- Audubon Elementary School
- Balboa Elementary School
- Bemiss Elementary School
- Browne Elementary School
- Cooper Elementary School
- Finch Elementary School
- Frances Scott Elementary School (formerly Sheridan Elementary School)
- Franklin Elementary School
- Garfield Elementary School
- Grant Elementary School
- Hamblen Elementary School
- Holmes Elementary School
- Hutton Elementary School
- Indian Trail Elementary School
- Jefferson Elementary School
- Libby Center Elementary School
- Lidgerwood Elementary School
- Lincoln Heights Elementary School
- Linwood Elementary School
- Logan Elementary School
- Longfellow Elementary School
- Madison Elementary School
- Moran Prairie Elementary School
- Mullan Road Elementary School
- Regal Elementary School
- Ridgeview Elementary School
- Roosevelt Elementary School
- Stevens Elementary School
- Westview Elementary School
- Whitman Elementary School
- Willard Elementary School
- Wilson Elementary School
- Woodridge Elementary School

=== Special programs ===
- APPLE
- Career and Technical Education (CTE)
- Childcare: Express
- Early Learning (Preschool)
- English Language Development (ELD)
- Envision program: Community Service
- Family Connections
- HEART – Homeless Education and Resource Team
- IMAGES
- Junior ROTC
- LAP
- Spokane Public Montessori
- Rubén Trejo Dual Language Academy (K-8)
- Odyssey Program
- Special education
- Spokane Virtual Learning
- SPRINT (7–8 Parent Participation)
- Tessera Program
- The Enrichment Cooperative (TEC)
- Title 1
- Work Study Program

== See also ==
- Education in Spokane, Washington
- One Spokane Stadium
