= Hamble =

Hamble may refer to:

- The River Hamble in Hampshire, England
- Hamble aerodrome on the banks of the River Hamble.
  - Hamble-Warsash Ferry, a ferry service on the River Hamble
- Hamble-le-Rice, a village on the river Hamble, close to the city of Southampton, England
  - Hamble railway station, serving Hamble-le-Rice
  - Hamble Aerostructures Sports & Social Club F.C., an association football team in Hamble-le-Rice
- Hamble, a doll featured on the BBC children's programme Play School and its Australian adaptation
- Fairey Hamble Baby, a seaplane designed by Fairey Aviation
