= Hamblen =

Hamblen is a surname. Notable people with the surname include:

- Frank Hamblen (1947–2017), National Basketball Association (NBA) coach and scout, and a former college basketball player at Syracuse University
- Herbert M. Hamblen (1905–1994), American Washington State politician
- J. H. Hamblen (1877–1971), lifelong Texan, a pastor of the Methodist Episcopal Church, South in Texas, an evangelist and revivalist preacher
- Lapsley W. Hamblen Jr. (1926–2012), judge of the United States Tax Court
- Mabel Hamblen (1904–1955), British swimmer
- Nicholas Hamblen, Lord Hamblen of Kersey (born 1957), a justice of the Supreme Court of the United Kingdom
- Stuart Hamblen (1908–1989), one of American radio's first singing cowboys in 1926, later becoming a Christian songwriter

== See also ==
- Hamblen County, Tennessee, county located in the U.S. state of Tennessee
- Hamblen Drive, Armstrong County, Texas, scenic road located about 20 miles south of Claude, Texas
- Hamblen Township, Brown County, Indiana, one of four townships in Brown County, Indiana
- Hamblen Block, three story housing block on Danforth Street in the West End neighborhood of Portland, Maine
- USS Hamblen (APA-114), Bayfield-class attack transport that served with the US Navy during World War II
- Hamblen Elementary School (Spokane, Washington), elementary school in Spokane, Washington, the United States
- Wales and Hamblen Store located in Bridgton, Maine, a building on the National Register of Historic Places
