= Hambley =

Hambley is a surname. Notable people with the surname include:

- Egbert Hambley (1862–1906), English engineer
- John Hambley (martyr) (died 1587), English Catholic and martyr
- John Hambley (producer), British television and film producer
- Mark Gregory Hambley (born 1948), veteran of more than 30 years in the U.S. diplomatic service
- Steve Hambley (born 1954), American politician
