= Washington State University College of Pharmacy and Pharmaceutical Sciences =

Coordinates: 47.6604161°N 117.406581°W

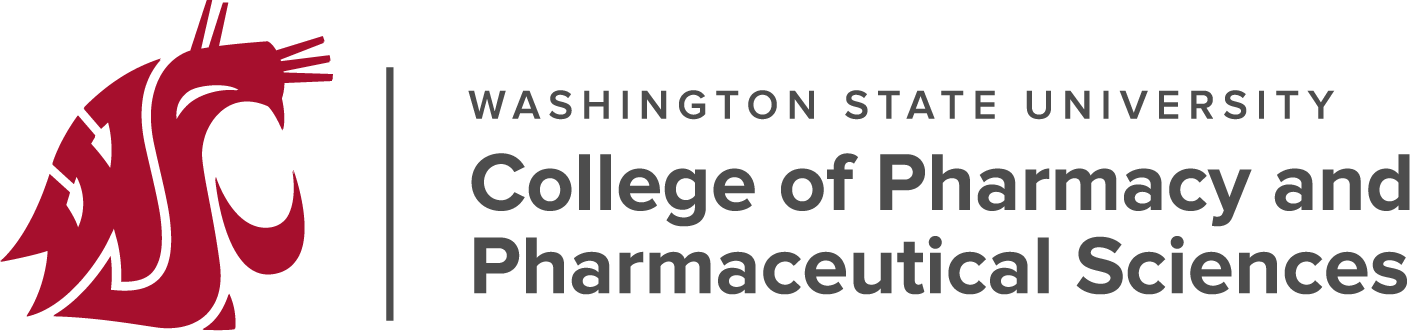
- Type: Public
- Established: 1891
- Parent institution: Washington State University
- Dean: Julie Akers
- Location: Spokane and Yakima, Washington, U.S.
- Website: www.pharmacy.wsu.edu

The Washington State University College of Pharmacy and Pharmaceutical Sciences is one of two PharmD granting institutions within the state of Washington. In 2013, the college and its programs were relocated to the WSU Health Sciences Spokane campus, which also houses the Elson S. Floyd College of Medicine and College of Nursing. Along with their Doctor of Pharmacy program, the college offers dual degrees and certificates in engineering, pharmaceutical sciences, communications and an MBA. To better serve rural areas of Washington state, in 2015 the college established its extension in Yakima, located in central Washington. The program is housed in the Pacific Northwest University campus.

As of 2020, the school has nearly 600 PharmD students, and 28 PhD students.
