= University District (Spokane, Washington) =

- District of Spokane
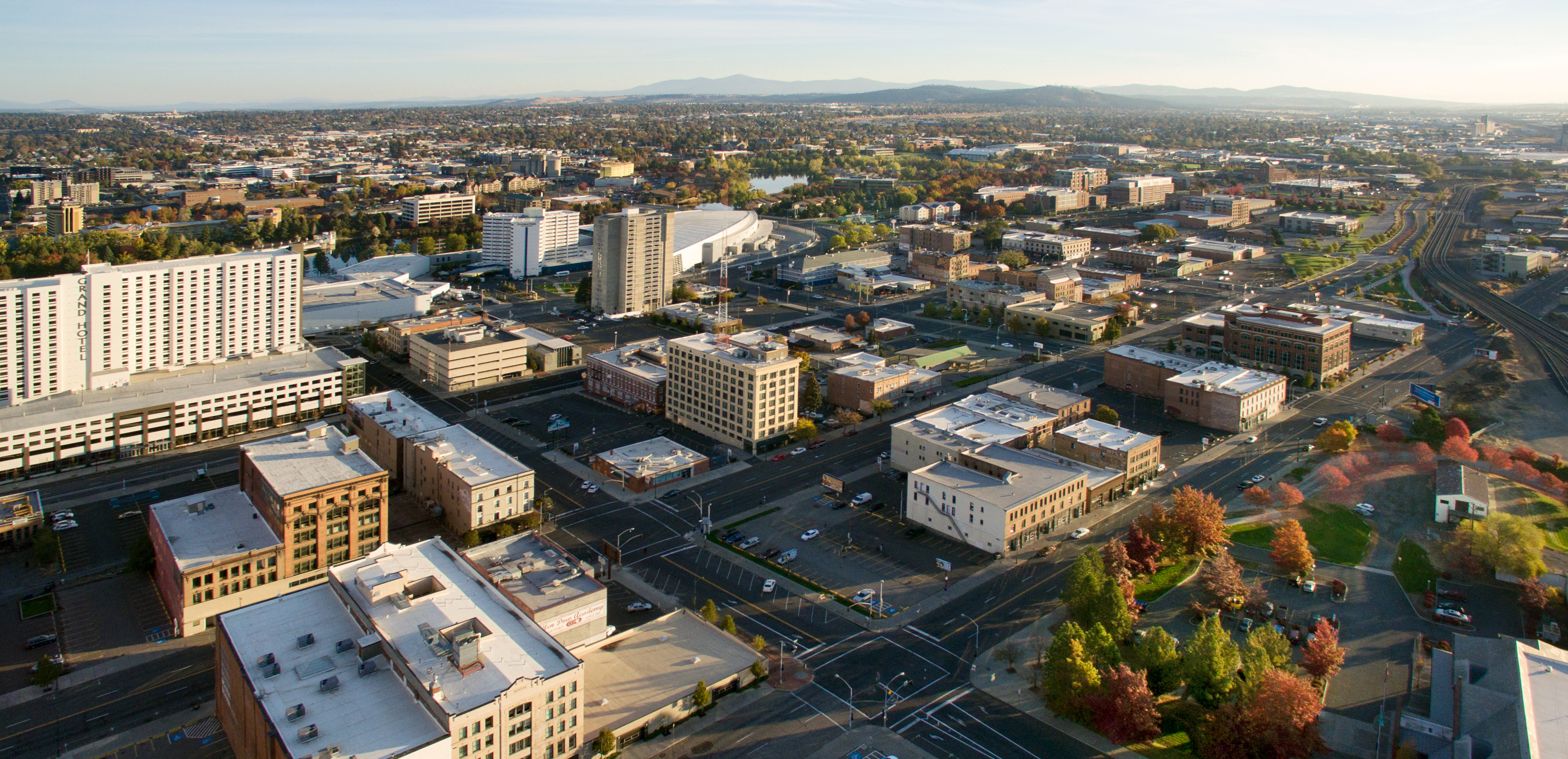
- Spokane's University District is pictured in the upper-right half of this 2015 image, looking northeast from Downtown Spokane.
- Interactive map of University District
- Coordinates: 47°39′40.1″N 117°24′20.9″W
- Country: United States
- State: Washington
- County: Spokane
- City: Spokane
- Time zone: UTC-8 (PST)
  - Summer (DST): UTC-7 (PDT)
- ZIP Codes: 99202, 99258
- Area code: 509

The University District, also referred as the U-District or Spokane University District, is a 770-acre (1.20 sq mi; 3.1 km^{2}) area, tax increment financing, and innovation district in Spokane, Washington. It is located just east of its Downtown Spokane in the East Central and Logan neighborhoods, and is home to a number of higher education institutions and their surrounding neighborhoods.

The district is approximately bounded by Sharp Avenue to the north, the Spokane River and the SR-290 spur to the east, Interstate 90 to the south, and the Division Street and Ruby/Browne Street couplet to the west. The district is primarily home to Gonzaga University, Washington State University's Health Sciences Spokane campus, and the Spokane campus of Eastern Washington University. Other institutions, such as the Community Colleges of Spokane, Whitworth University, and the University of Washington also have branch operations in the University District.

== History ==
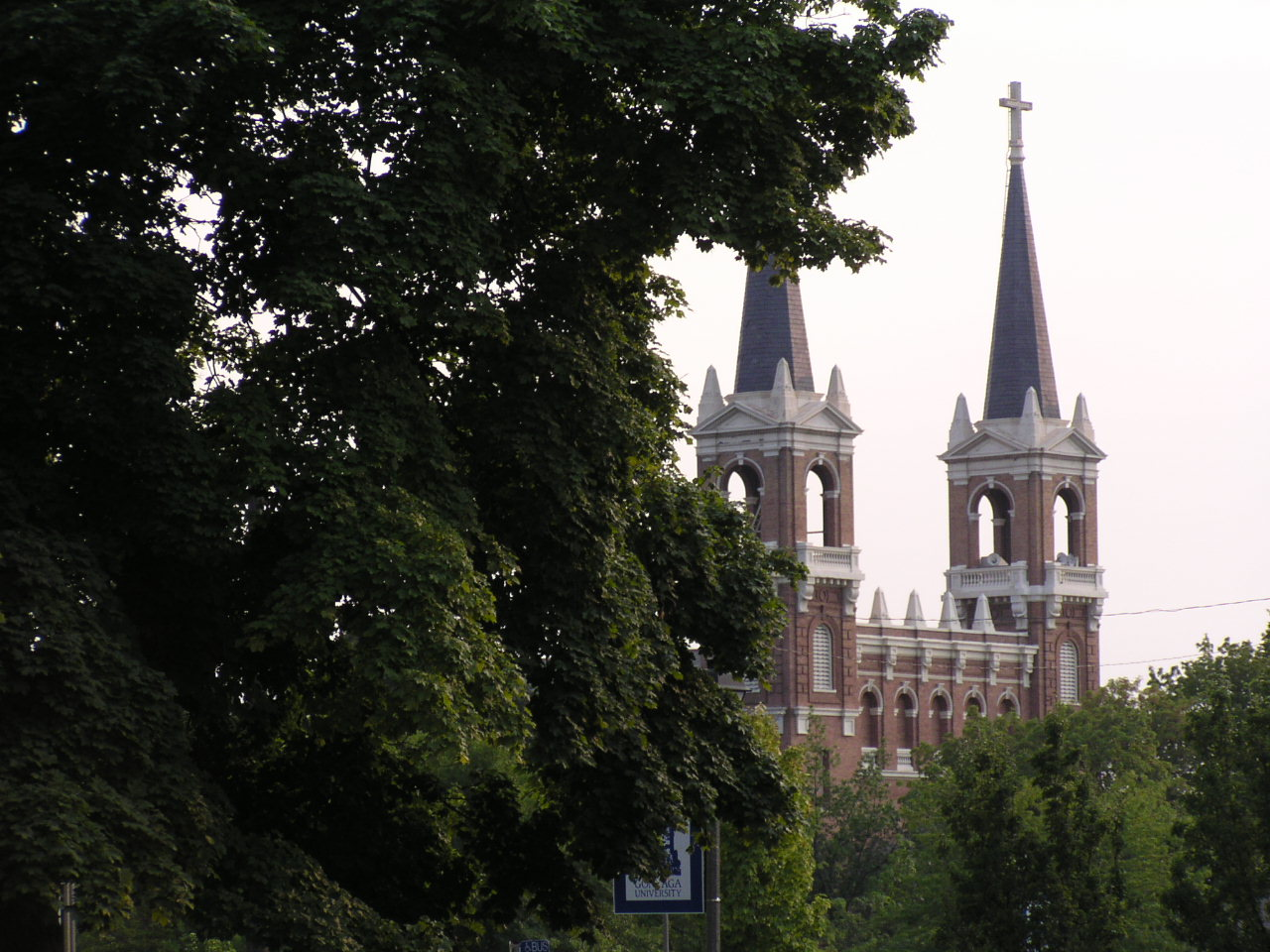
St. Aloysius Gonzaga parish church, on the campus of Gonzaga University

What is now the southern half of the University District, south of the river, was initially developed in the 1890s and 1910s as a commercial district and rail yard. The area was home to numerous warehouses for department and grocery stores such as Sears and Roebuck and Safeway. The historic Schade Brewery was constructed in the area in 1903 and is listed on the National Register of Historic Places. The Great Northern, Milwaukee Road and Great Northern railroads passed through the area until the 1970s, when most of the railroads in the city center were torn out ahead of Expo 74.

Higher education came to the area in the early 1990s, after a mandate from the state that Washington State University establish a branch campus in Spokane. In 1992, a blueprint for what would be known as the Riverpoint Campus was published, with plans for five to seven buildings that would house the Spokane campuses of Eastern Washington University and Washington State University. The first building to open was the Spokane Intercollegiate Research and Technology Institute (SIRTI) at 665 N. Riverpoint Blvd in 1994. Starting in the 1990s and continuing into the first decades of the 21st century, the campus expanded with new construction and the renovation of old buildings. This growth took place around the Riverpoint area, roughly between the Spokane River to the north and east and the BNSF railroad about three blocks to the south.

Expansion south of the railroad tracks was planned starting in early 2014, when the city established the University District Redevelopment Implementation Strategy. A pedestrian and cyclist bridge over the railroad tracks was completed in 2019, connecting the WSU and EWU campuses with the intersection of Sherman Street and Sprague Avenue. Development around the southern landing of the bridge has taken place in the years since the bridge was opened.

North of the river, the University District has been home to higher education since the 1880s. Gonzaga University was established as Gonzaga College in 1887. The St. Aloysius church was dedicated in 1911, and Gonzaga's law school was opened a year later in 1912. That same year, the Washington state legislature granted Gonzaga official "university" status. The school began allowing women in 1948. The university has undergone significant expansion and growth since 1999, when the men's basketball team broke onto the national scene with a run to the Elite Eight of the 1999 NCAA tournament.

Though now also referred to as a local area in Spokane, the University District was created as a 770-acre tax-increment financing district to promote and support land, economic, and educational development at the universities that lie within the district and the areas that surround them.

== Areas ==
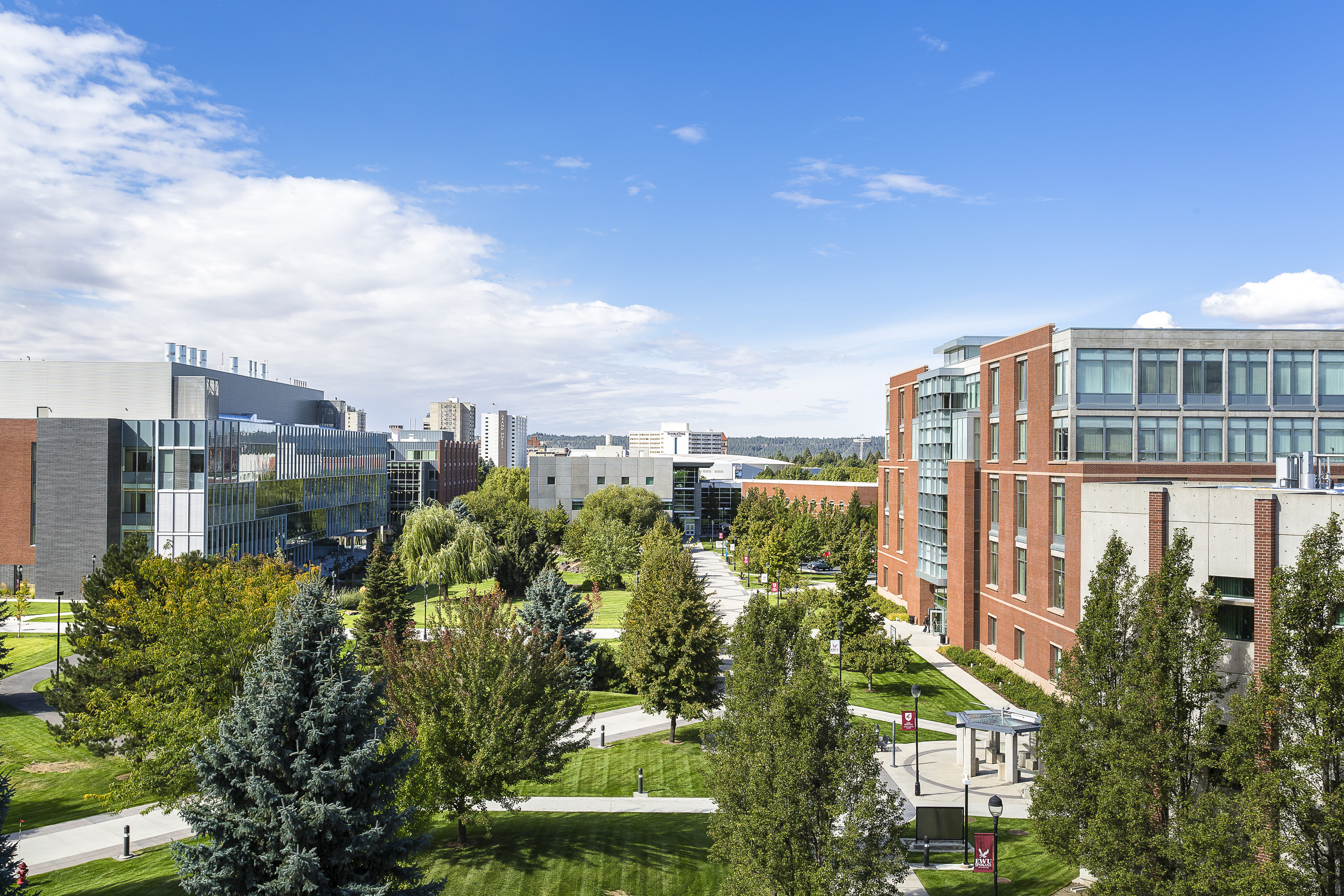
WSU Health Sciences Spokane Campus in 2015

The University District spans across parts of four Spokane neighborhoods Riverside, East Central, Logan, and Emerson/Garfield and comprises three main areas.

=== Gonzaga University ===
The northern portion of the University District is home to Gonzaga University. Gonzaga is a private, Jesuit institution with a 152-acre campus and 7,295 students (4,852 underclassmen) as of 2021. Gonzaga offers 16 undergraduate degrees across 49 majors, 24 master's degrees and 5 doctoral degrees. Its athletic teams compete at the NCAA Division I level in the West Coast Conference. The Desmet Avenue Warehouse Historic District, a U.S. historic district listed on the National Register of Historic Places, is located on the western edge of Gonzaga's campus.

University of Washington School of Medicine has a branch with Gonzaga just south of the main campus in the University District.

=== WSU Health Sciences Spokane campus, formerly Riverpoint Campus ===
The middle portions of the University District are home to Washington State University Spokane, Eastern Washington University Spokane, and various other academic institutions. The campus was originally established in 1990 as the Riverpoint Higher Education Park, later renamed the Riverpoint Campus.

=== South University District ===
The south portion of the University District is a target development area for academic expansion, housing, and other business incubators. The South University District is situated along Sprague Avenue and is connected to the WSU Health Sciences Spokane campus via the University District Gateway Bridge, a pedestrian and bicycle-only cable-stayed suspension bridge that opened in December 2018. The 120-foot-tall (37 m) bridge was named through a public contest with 281 submissions, including rejected monikers like "Bridgey McBridgeface" and "Bridge to Hookerville", the latter of which had been banned from city council meetings.

== Initiatives ==
=== Smart city ===
The University District is home to a smart city initiative named Urbanova, which is the first smart city project of its kind in the State of Washington. The project was launched in 2016 by founding partners Avista Utilities, Itron, Washington State University, McKinstry, the University District Development Association, and the City of Spokane. Additional partners include Gallup and Verizon. Current projects include smart and connected street lights and a shared energy economy model.

The project also has support from Washington State University's Voiland College of Engineering and Architecture, based at WSU's main Pullman campus, to develop a framework that can monitor, predict, and control energy usage and air quality, and also record the resulting health impacts, in the University District.

The shared energy economy model pilot received a $7 million grant from the Washington Department of Commerce's Clean Energy Fund to study also distributed energy by creating a microgrid of solar arrays, battery storage, and building energy management systems.

=== Public Transit ===
The Spokane Transit Authority, the region's public transportation provider, serves the University District with eight fixed schedule bus lines including the City Line, a bus rapid transit line.

Route	Termini			Service operation and notes	Streets traveled
1; City Line	Browne's Addition	↔	Chief Garry Park; Spokane Community College	Bus rapid transit	Cannon St, 4th Ave, Spruce St, Pacific, 1st Ave, Wall St, Main Ave, Pine, Spokane Falls Blvd, Cincinnati, Mission Ave, Riverside Ave, Sprague Ave, 2nd Ave
6; Cheney	University District; Spokane Teaching Health Clinic; Washington State University Spokane	↔	Cheney; Eastern Washington University	Regional route	Front, Spokane Falls, Browne/Division, Riverside/Sprague, STA Plaza, Jefferson, Jefferson Park & Ride, I-90, West Plains Transit Center, WA 904, Betz, 6th, Elm, Washington, K Street Transit Station
9; Sprague	Downtown Spokane; STA Plaza at Bay 6	↔	Spokane Valley; Valley Transit Center	Frequent route	Sprague
12; Southside Medical Shuttle	University District; Gateway Bridge	↔	Downtown Spokane; STA Plaza at Bay 8	Shuttle route	Gateway Bridge, Cancer Care Northwest, Rockwood Clinic, Inland Imaging, St. Luke's, Sacred Heart, Heart Institute, Eye Clinic, Deaconess, STA Plaza
14; South Adams/Napa	Chief Gary Park; Napa St. & Mission Ave.	↔	Cliff/Cannon; 14th Ave. & Adams St.	Regular route	Wall, 6th Ave., Bernard, 5th Ave., Division, 7th Ave., McClellan, 8th Ave., Rockwood Blvd. Cowley, Sherman
25; Division	Downtown Spokane; STA Plaza at Bay 6	↔	Fairwood; Hastings Park & Ride	Frequent route	Division/Ruby couplet
26; Lidgerwood	Downtown Spokane; STA Plaza at Bay 5	↔	Shiloh Hills; Northpointe Shopping Center	Regular route	Martin Luther King, Pine, Spokane Falls, Hamilton
28; Nevada	Downtown Spokane; STA Plaza at Bay 5	↔	Country Homes; Whitworth University	Regular route	Martin Luther King, Pine, Spokane Falls, Hamilton

Table updated for STA September 2023 service change.
