= Washington State University College of Nursing =

American nursing school

Coordinates: 47.6605°N 117.4082°W

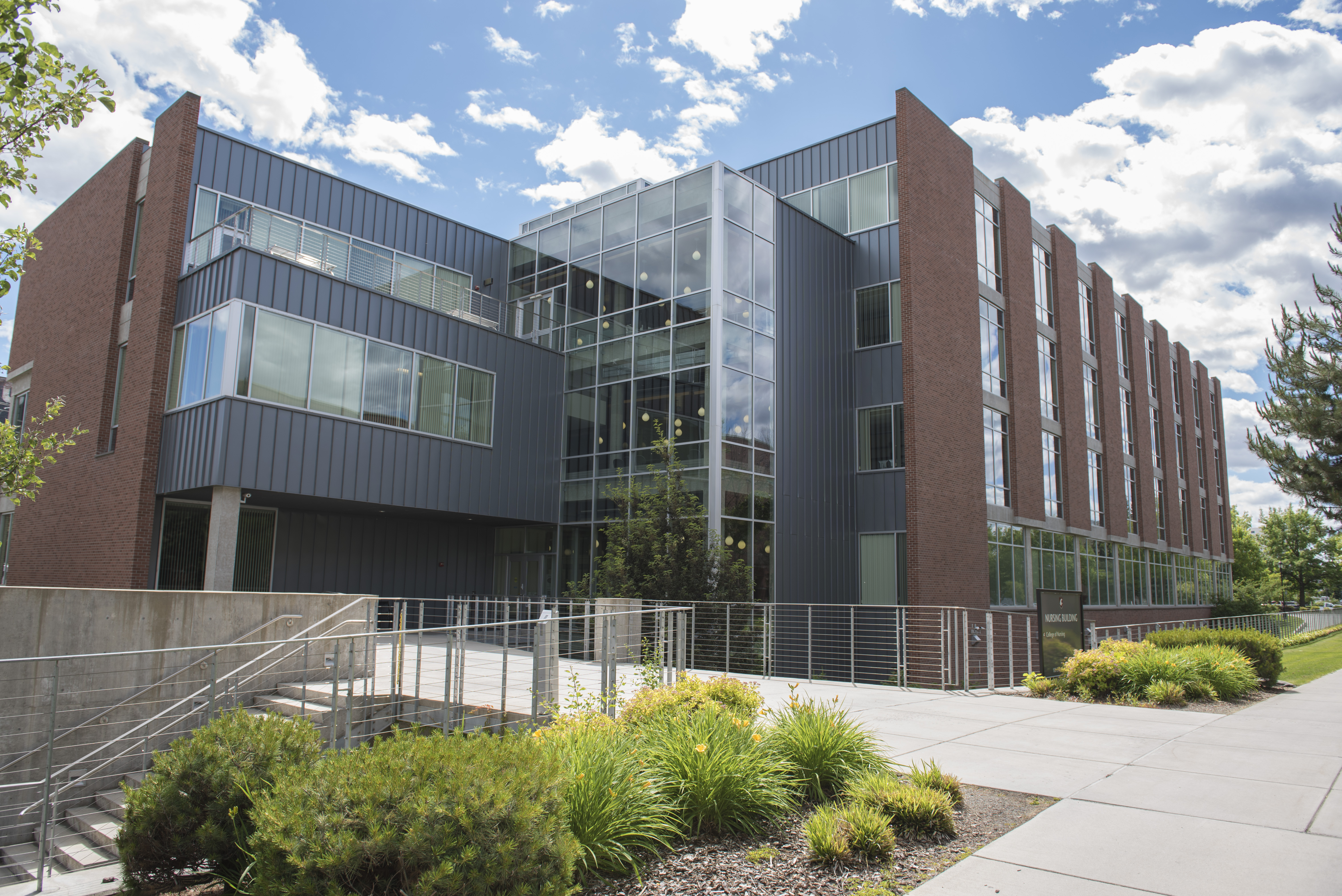
- The WSU College of Nursing Building
- Former names: Intercollegiate Center for Nursing Education, ICNE
- Type: Public
- Established: 1968
- Parent institution: Washington State University
- Dean: Mary Koithan
- Location: 103 E. Spokane Falls Boulevard, Spokane, Washington
- Campus: urban
- Website: https://nursing.wsu.edu

The Washington State University College of Nursing is a nursing school affiliated with Washington State University. Its main location is on the Washington State University Health Sciences campus in Spokane, Washington, with programs also offered at WSU Vancouver, and WSU Tri-Cities. Degrees offered include Bachelor of Science in Nursing; RN-BSN; Master of Nursing; Doctor of Nursing Practice; and PhD. Enrollment among all programs at all locations was 942 for spring semester 2018.

The college was founded in Spokane in 1968 as the Intercollegiate Center for Nursing Education. The WSU College of Nursing still accepts students from Eastern Washington University and Whitworth University, two of the three original intercollegiate partners.

== History ==
The Spokane League for Nursing and the Inland Empire Nurses' Association formed a joint committee on nursing education in 1964 with the goal of establishing a baccalaureate nursing program in Eastern Washington. Following several years of meetings and consultations, a steering committee proposed an intercollegiate model of nursing education to the presidents and boards of regents of the four colleges and universities interested in the concept: Washington State University in Pullman; Eastern Washington State College in Cheney; and Whitworth College and Fort Wright College, both in Spokane. All four institutions approved the plan, which had students completing pre-nursing studies at their respective colleges then moving on to nursing studies at the Intercollegiate Center for Nursing Education in Spokane. The first class of 37 students was admitted to ICNE in July, 1969. The program was accredited by the National League for Nursing in 1974.

ICNE was located in the former Carnegie Library in downtown Spokane when it opened. That space proved inadequate to the program's growth, and Sen. Warren Magnuson, D-Wash., helped obtain federal financing in 1977 to build a new facility to house the nursing program. The Warren G. Magnuson Intercollegiate Nursing Building opened in 1980 on a site across from Spokane Falls Community College, northwest of downtown Spokane. The facility cost $5.76 million.

In 1981, ICNE established ICNE Yakima as an extended campus, housed in a small cottage near Yakima Valley Community College. The next year, Fort Wright College closed, ending its participation in the intercollegiate nursing education program. Washington State University opened branch campuses in Vancouver, Washington, and in Richland, Washington, which is part of the Tri-Cities. Nursing programs were offered at both branch campuses.

In 2005, the Washington Legislature gave WSU $32 million to build a College of Nursing facility on what was then called the Riverpoint Campus - Now WSU Health Sciences Spokane - in downtown Spokane. The final construction cost was $34.6 million, with the federal government contributing another nearly $2.5 million to fund technology for distance education and simulation. Students began attending classes there in 2009.

== Programs ==
The WSU College of Nursing began offering a Bachelor of Science in Nursing (BSN) in 1969. It added the degree-completion program RN-BSN in 1978 and a Master of Nursing (MN) degree program in 1983 to train advanced-practice nurses to provide primary care. The PhD program began in 2007, and the newest degree, the Doctor of Nursing Practice (DNP), was added in 2012.
