= Spokane Community College Transit Center =

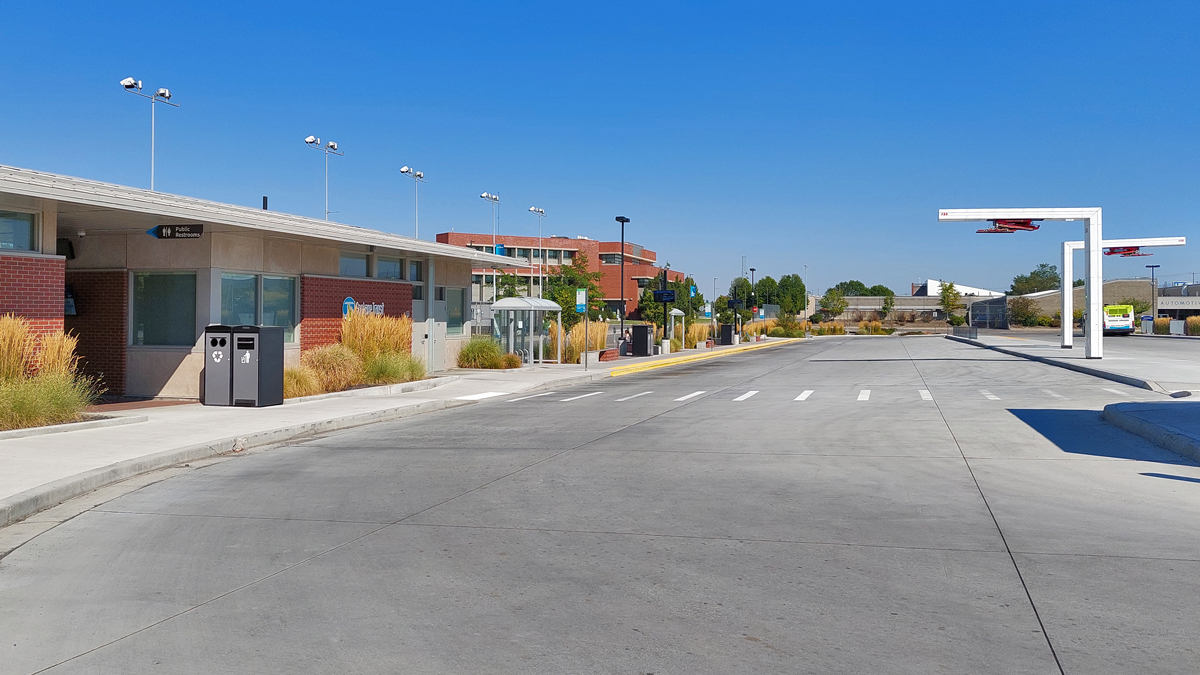
- Spokane Community College Transit Center, pictured in September 2022, featuring shelters, restrooms, and battery electric bus charging infrastructure

General information
- Location: 1810 N Greene St., Spokane, WA 99217
- Coordinates: 47.673°N 117.358°W
- System: STA transit center
- Owner: Spokane Transit Authority
- Bus stands: 4
- Connections: Routes 1,31,32,33,34,342,343

Construction
- Structure type: Surface
- Accessible: Yes

History
- Opened: c. 1984
- Rebuilt: 2013, 2019 (relocated to southeast side of campus)

Passengers
- 1,436 (avg. weekday, 2022)
Location

Spokane Community College Transit Center or SCC Transit Center is a transit center and BRT terminus in the Spokane Transit Authority route system. It is one of Spokane Transit's four primary transit centers, along with the STA Plaza, West Plains, and Pence-Cole Valley transit centers.

It is located on the southeastern corner of the Spokane Community College campus along Mission Avenue and serves as a transfer point for bus routes serving Spokane Valley, Millwood, North Spokane, and South Spokane. It also serves as the eastern terminus for the City Line.

== History ==
Spokane Community College Transit Center with its original shelter structures on the west side of the SCC Campus, pictured in 2011.

=== Initial transit center ===
Planning for the Spokane Community College transit center began around 1982 and the center opened c. 1984. It was later reconstructed during summer 2013 in a project that replaced all existing shelter structures and added additional bus loading zones. The 2013 improvements are intended to be an interim solution as the transit center will eventually be replaced by a newer and larger one.

=== 2019 relocation ===
The decision was made to reconstruct the Spokane Community College transit center at a site on the opposite side of campus. Growing transit operations combined with site constraints, particularly the construction of an elevated North Spokane Corridor adjacent to the current site, limit the future potential of the transit center in its current form. Construction on the new transit center began in 2019 and was completed in December 2019.

== City Line ==
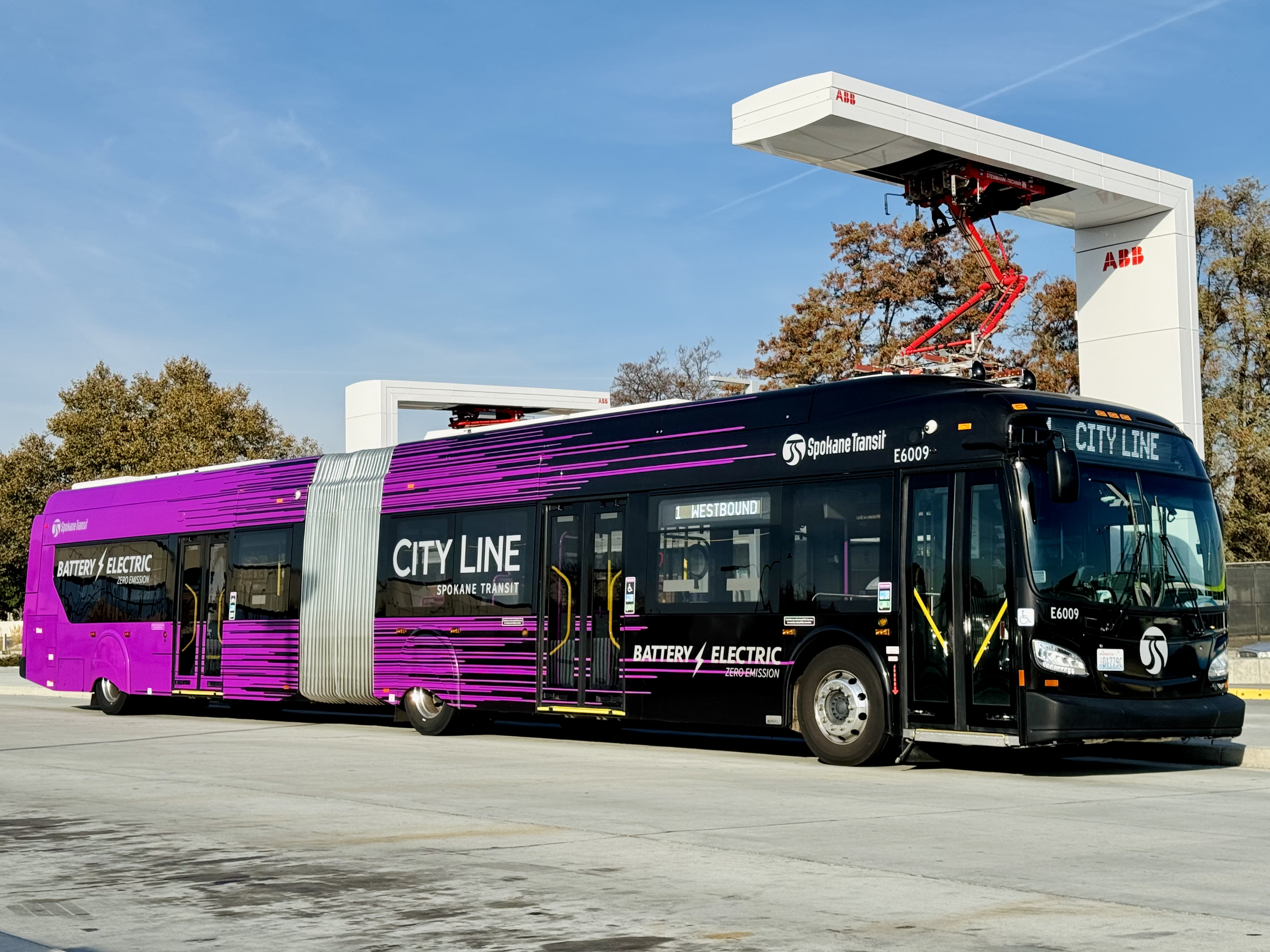
STA City Line bus recharging at Spokane Community College Transit Center

The SCC Transit Center serves as the eastern terminus of the City Line bus rapid transit (BRT) line, which began service in 2023. Infrastructure for the battery-electric buses includes two in-route ABB overhead SAE J3105 pantograph fast chargers.

== Location ==
As implied by its name, the transit center is located at the southeast corner of the Spokane Community College campus.

== Routes ==
As of February 2025, the Spokane Community College Transit Center serves six routes and is a terminus and charging center for the City Line.

Route	Termini			Service level	Streets traveled
1 City Line	Browne's Addition; Cannon Street and 4th Avenue	↔	Chief Garry Park; Spokane Community College at City Line Bay	Bus Rapid Transit	Cannon St, 4th Ave, Spruce St, Pacific, 1st Ave, Wall St, Main Ave, Pine, Spokane Falls Blvd, Cincinnati, Mission Ave, Riverside Ave, Sprague Ave, 2nd Ave
31; Minnehaha/Lidgerwood	Shiloh Hills; Dakota Street and Jay Street	↔	Chief Garry Park; Spokane Community College at Bay 3	Regular Route	Mission, Greene, Carlisle, Ralph, Upriver, Frederick, Euclid, Market, Garland, Empire, Addison, Wellesley, Lidgerwood, Francis, Addision, Standard, Wedgewood, Wiscomb, Welle, Lincoln, Nevada, Jay, Dakota, Holland
32; Trent/Montgomery	Chief Garry Park; Spokane Community College at Bay 1	↔	Spokane Valley Mirabeau Transit Center	Regular Route	Mission, Greene, Freya, Trent, Vista, Buckeye, Argonne, Montgomery, Mansfield, Mirabeau Pkwy, Indiana
33; Wellesley	West Hills; Spokane Falls Community College at SFCC Station Bay 2	↔	Chief Garry Park; Spokane Community College at Bay 2	Frequent Route	Whistalks Way, TJ Meenach Drive, Cochran/Alberta, Driscoll Blvd, Wellesley, Haven/Market, Greene, Mission
34; Freya	Lincoln Heights; South Hill Park & Ride	↔	Chief Garry Park; Spokane Community College at Bay 3	Regular Route	SE Blvd, 29th Ave, Freya, 18th Ave, Ray, Thor/Freya, Freya Way, Greene, Mission
342; Fairgrounds Shuttle	Chief Garry Park; Spokane Community College at Bay 1	↔	Spokane County Interstate Fairgrounds Broadway Ave @ Gate Drop Off	This route only operates during the annual Spokane Interstate Fair in September.	Mission, Havana, Broadway, Fancher, Trent
