= Division Bus Rapid Transit =

Under-development bus rapid transit line in Spokane, Washington, United States

- A design visualization of the Division Bus Rapid Transit line

Overview
- System: Spokane Transit Authority
- Operator: Spokane Transit Authority
- Vehicle: TBD
- Status: In preliminary-design
- Began service: 2029–2030 (proposed)

Route
- Route type: Bus rapid transit
- Locale: Spokane, Washington
- Start: Downtown Spokane, near the STA Plaza (final location TBD)
- End: Hastings Park and Ride (short-term); Future transit center near Mead, Washington (long-term)
- Length: 9 miles (14 km)
- Stations: 28 or more

Service
- Frequency: Peak: 10 minutes Evenings: 15 minutes
- Weekend frequency: 15 minutes

Division Bus Rapid Transit, also known as Division BRT, is the working name for a planned bus rapid transit line in Spokane, Washington that will extend 9 miles from Downtown Spokane to the Mead, Washington area, north of Spokane. The line will be operated by Spokane Transit Authority, with a planned launch in 2030, and will be the region's second bus rapid transit line, after the City Line.

The project culminates Spokane Transit's long-term planning efforts, which date back to the early 2010s, to transform the heavily utilized, existing #25 Division bus route running along Division Street into a high performance transit (HPT) corridor. Voter passage of Spokane Transit Proposition 1 in 2016 began the first phases of the transformation, by funding interim improvements to passenger amenities, bus size, and increased service hours of the route, which have upgraded the existing route into an HPT "Lite" line within the Spokane Transit network. Full conversion into a bus rapid transit line represents the last stage of developing the route into a full HPT corridor within the STA system. Once open, the BRT line will replace the current bus service that runs along the corridor.

In April 2021, Spokane Transit Authority adopted a locally preferred alternative for the alignment, vehicular mode, and other BRT strategies. As of 2022, the corridor is in preliminary design to finalize among other things, station and termini locations. A parallel study is also being led by the Spokane Regional Transportation Council to study increased land-use density along the corridor.

== History ==
=== Corridor history ===
As the main north–south arterial street through Spokane, North Division Street has long had a history of transit service along the corridor and has historically been home to one of the busiest bus routes in the Spokane Transit Authority system, carrying nearly one million passengers annually. However, despite the corridor's prominent role in transportation in Spokane, transit service along the corridor through the late-2010s was relatively basic, with sparse amenities, average frequencies, and smaller 40-foot buses.

On July 21, 2010, the Spokane Transit Authority Board of Directors adopted a new comprehensive plan for public transportation in the Spokane region. The plan, called Connect Spokane, included a section dubbed High Performance Transit (HPT), which was described as a network of corridors "providing all-day, two-way, reliable, and frequent service which offers competitive speeds to the private automobile and features improved amenities for passengers." Six HPT corridors were initially identified, with Division Street being one of them. The plan has been updated several times over the years, with a significant update to the High Performance Transit section in 2012 through 2013 as part of the agency's STA Moving Forward planning process to drastically improve and expand in the region over the long term.

=== High performance transit development ===
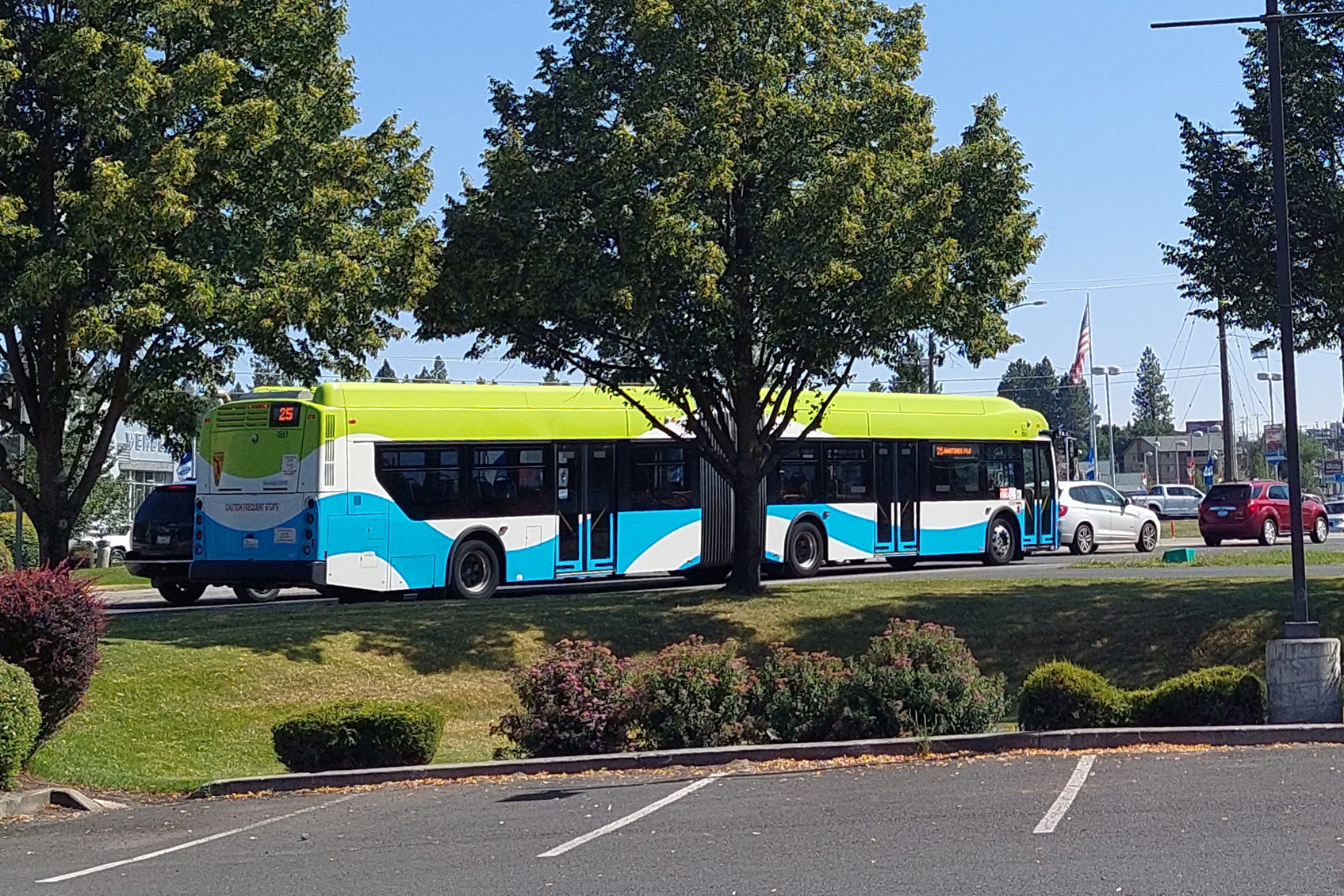
A 60-foot, articulated Spokane Transit Authority bus, operating as route 25, makes its way south at the North Division Y. Transit service along Division Street began to be upgraded in 2017 to utilize the larger buses on a full-time basis.

Work to begin developing the existing #25 Division bus route into a high performance transit line began in April 2012, when Spokane Transit's Board of Directors approved a $1.2 million grant request to the Federal Transit Administration to study ways the route could be improved to handle an increase efficiency and an increase in passengers. Early ideas included installing dedicated bus and business access lanes, traffic signal prioritization, off-board ticketing, and increasing bus frequency. The STA Board cited another desire for the study – recognizing the potential for infill development and redevelopment of land to occur along the largely-commercial Division Street, which would gradually transform it into a denser, mixed-use corridor, thereby increasing the already-high transit demand along the corridor.

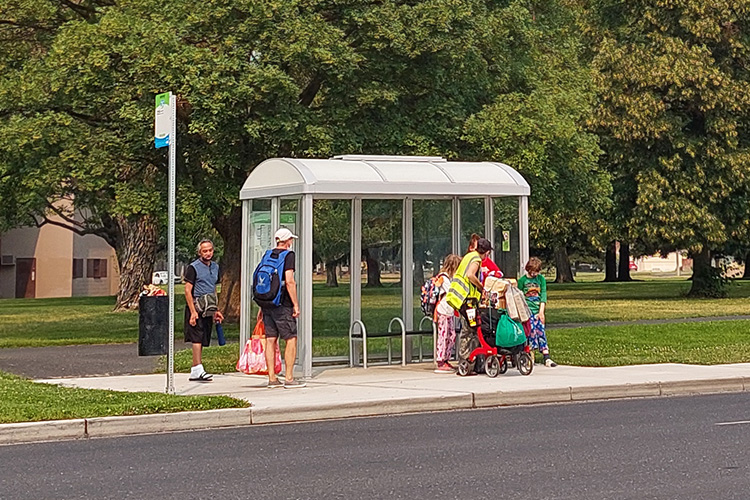
Example of an enhanced shelter installed in the late 2010s as part of Division Street's High Performance Transit corridor development.

The Division Street corridor is identified in the High Performance Transit (HPT) section of the Connect Spokane plan as route "F1", and is part the plan's HPT-Frequent category, which stipulates a line that provides moderate speed, with high access and frequency, focused on multi-modal first/last mile connections. The route alignment is described to run from Downtown Spokane, northward along Division Street and Newport Highway to a terminus near the city's northern border at Hawthorne Road, following the alignment of a majority of the already-present bus route along Division Street. The three-phase HPT implementation strategy for the route included near, mid, and long-term development stages, beginning with improving capacity, expanding service hours, and improving passenger amenities. Mid-term strategies for the route included enhanced vehicles, improved frequency, and additional amenities and park and rides. Long-term strategies would transition the route to electric bus rapid transit vehicles in center-running transit-only lanes.

With voter approval of Spokane Transit Proposition 1 in November 2016, Spokane Transit embarked on implementing projects identified in its STA Moving Forward initiative, which included transit improvements to the Division Street corridor. Projects would upgrade the existing Division bus route into an HPT "Lite" line, incorporating some of the near and mid-term improvements identified in F1 corridor HPT implementation strategy. Upgrades to passenger amenities such as enhanced shelters and additional sidewalks began to be implemented. In the summer of 2017, STA took delivery of three new 60-foot articulated buses, expanding its existing fleet of articulated buses to be enable the possibility of running larger buses on its busiest routes such as Division. An additional seven articulated buses were delivered in 2018, allowing STA to run 60-foot buses on its Division route full-time.

=== Bus rapid transit implementation ===
Because STA's 2016 ballot measure only included funding to bring the Division corridor up to an HPT "Lite" service status, the timeline and funding for full transformation of the route into a bus rapid transit line remained unknown.

However, in December 2019, STA and the Spokane Regional Transportation Council began a $1 million study to evaluate how transportation and land-use along the North Division Street corridor could be transformed after the anticipated 2029 completion of the North Spokane Corridor, which is expected decrease traffic levels along Division Street. The reduction in traffic would allow the opportunity to convert existing traffic lanes along the corridor into dedicated bus lanes, as well as allow for some portions of roadway to be reclaimed for bike lanes. Through 2020 and 2021, a steering committee composed of officials from the City of Spokane, Spokane County, Washington State Department of Transportation, also participated in the study. Members of the public, landowners, and stakeholders also were given opportunities to provide feedback in online open houses.

Several options for bus traffic alignment were studied, including dedicated center-running bus lanes, dedicated side-running bus lanes, as well as business access and transit (BAT) lanes. Highly transformative options were also studied for the Division-Ruby Street couplet, located in the southern portion of the corridor. The couplet currently features four, wide traffic lanes running in each direction, which afforded the opportunity for creative proposals including converting Division and Ruby streets back into a two-way streets and installing two-way cycle tracks.

Throughout the study, general support was found for a fixed guideway bus rapid transit line on dedicated side-running Business Access and Transit (BAT) lanes. On April 15, 2021, the Spokane Transit Authority board officially approved the side-running BAT alignment option as the Locally Preferred Alternative (LPA) for bus rapid transit development along the Division Street corridor. Within the two-way mainline portion of Division Street, the adopted side-running option would convert the outer-most lane in each roadway direction into BAT lanes. In the Division-Ruby Couplet, the board adopted Side-Running Option C, which would maintain Division and Ruby in their current one-way street configurations, but add a parking lane to Division Street, and install a two-way cycle track along Ruby Street. BAT lanes would be installed in the right-most lane of Division and Ruby.

In summer 2021, STA put a request for proposals to select an engineering firm to further develop the bus rapid transit project. As of 2022, Spokane Transit will be advancing the preliminary engineering of the project, with the intent of submitting the project into the FTA Small Starts program for entry into Project Development sometime in 2023. Contingent upon funding, the line could begin construction as soon as 2025, with a 2027 launch date.

=== Funding ===
The line is projected to cost $166.5 million and is expected to be funded through a mix of federal, state, and local sources.

In March 2022, the Washington State Legislature passed a $16 billion state-wide transportation package that would include a $50 million appropriation for developing bus rapid transit along Division Street. It is also anticipated that federal funds will cover an additional $75 million toward the project.

As of May 2023, the City Line project was projected to be under budget and in July, the STA board voted to allocate the unused local funds to the Division Street BRT. In spring 2026, the Federal Transit Administration gave the project medium-high rating under its capital investment grant (CIG) program, and as of July 1, 2026, $82 million in federal CIG funds have been allocated to the program.

On August 4, 2026, voters within Spokane Transit Authority's Public transportation benefit area (PTBA) reauthorized existing sales tax funding for public transportation, enabling STA to contribute local funds toward the overall project costs.

=== Project development ===
In September 2023, the Federal Transportation Administration (FTA) approved the Division BRT for project development phase.

== Route ==
A design visualization of the locally preferred alternative (LPA) adopted by Spokane Transit Authority, which would transform the couplet portion of Division Street by converting one lane of its four lanes into a BAT lane, and convert another into an on-street parking lane.

The Division BRT route will mostly follow the North Division Street corridor through Spokane, running north from Downtown and terminating north of Spokane near Mead. Studies are currently being done for the route's northern and southern termini locations. Most of the alignment will run in shared bus lanes, specifically Business Access and Transit (BAT) lanes, that will be reserved for transit vehicles but permit access to other vehicles for local business access and turning movements.

Station locations along the route are still being finalized, but early studies show stations at major arterial intersections along the route, with additional stops spaced approximately every 1/4 to 1/3 mile.

In May 2023, STA previewed the locally preferred alternative for 27 potential station locations. The route spans from 2nd Avenue and Wall Street, through downtown, north on Division street until Hastings road, near Whitworth University, where the route turns East and terminates at a new Mead Transit Center on the intersection of Highway 2 and Farwell road.

== Stations ==
Design visualization of a typical BRT station design along the planned line.

Station design has not been finalized, however, it is expected that all stations will be side-boarding, based on the adopted side-running BAT lane alignment of the Division BRT line. Early design visualizations suggest stations will be based on the same design as that of Spokane's other bus rapid transit line, City Line, with glass windscreen and roof panels set along a curvilinear roof beam form, along with off-board ticketing kiosks, raised platforms, branding pylon, and real-time transit info displays.

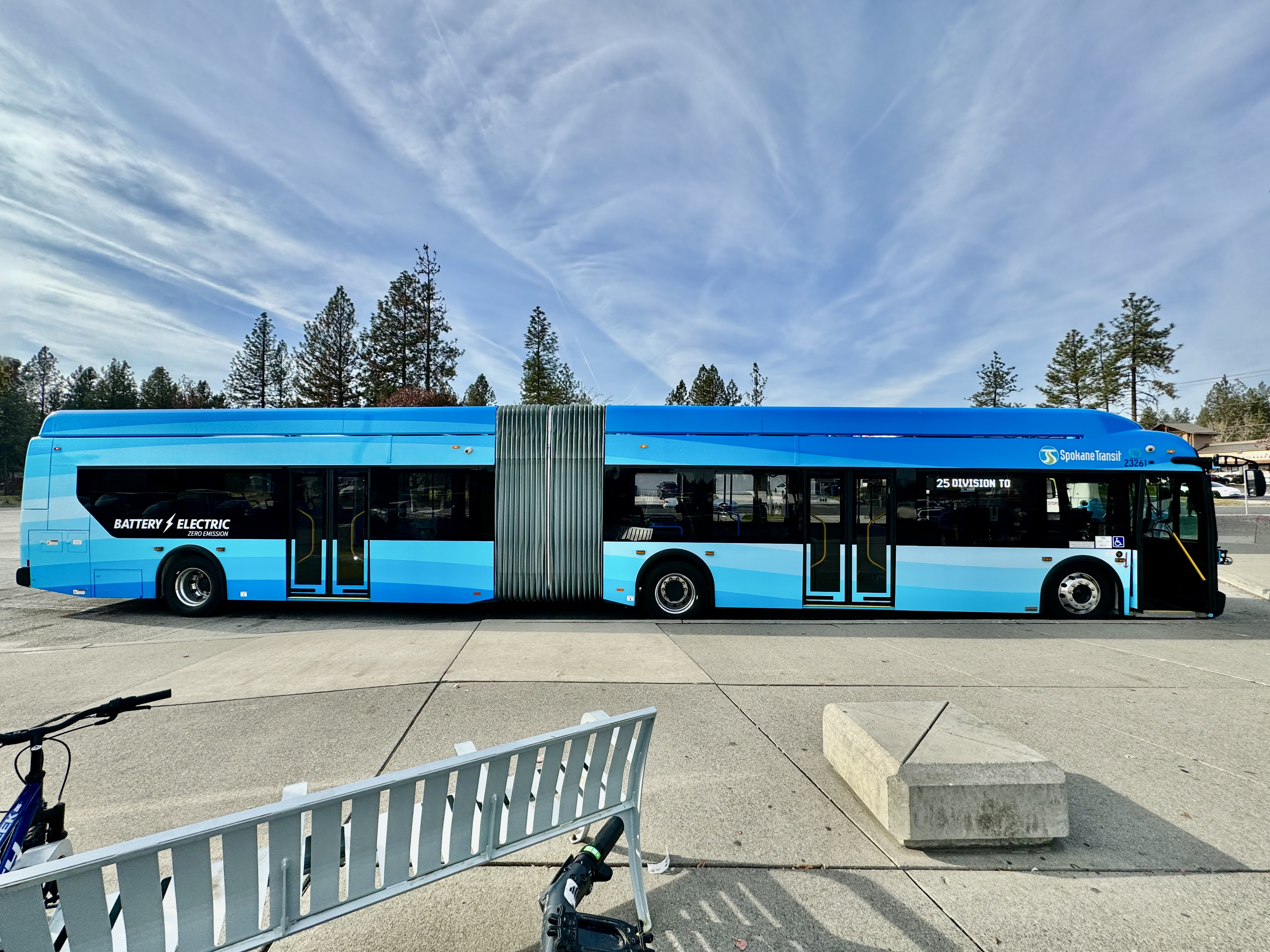
New Flyer XE60 battery electric bus on Route 25 Division in October 2023

== Vehicles ==
Spokane Transit will run 60-foot, zero-emission articulated buses along the route, similar to the equipment selected for the City Line.
