= Chief Garry Park, Spokane =

Chief Garry Park
- Neighborhood
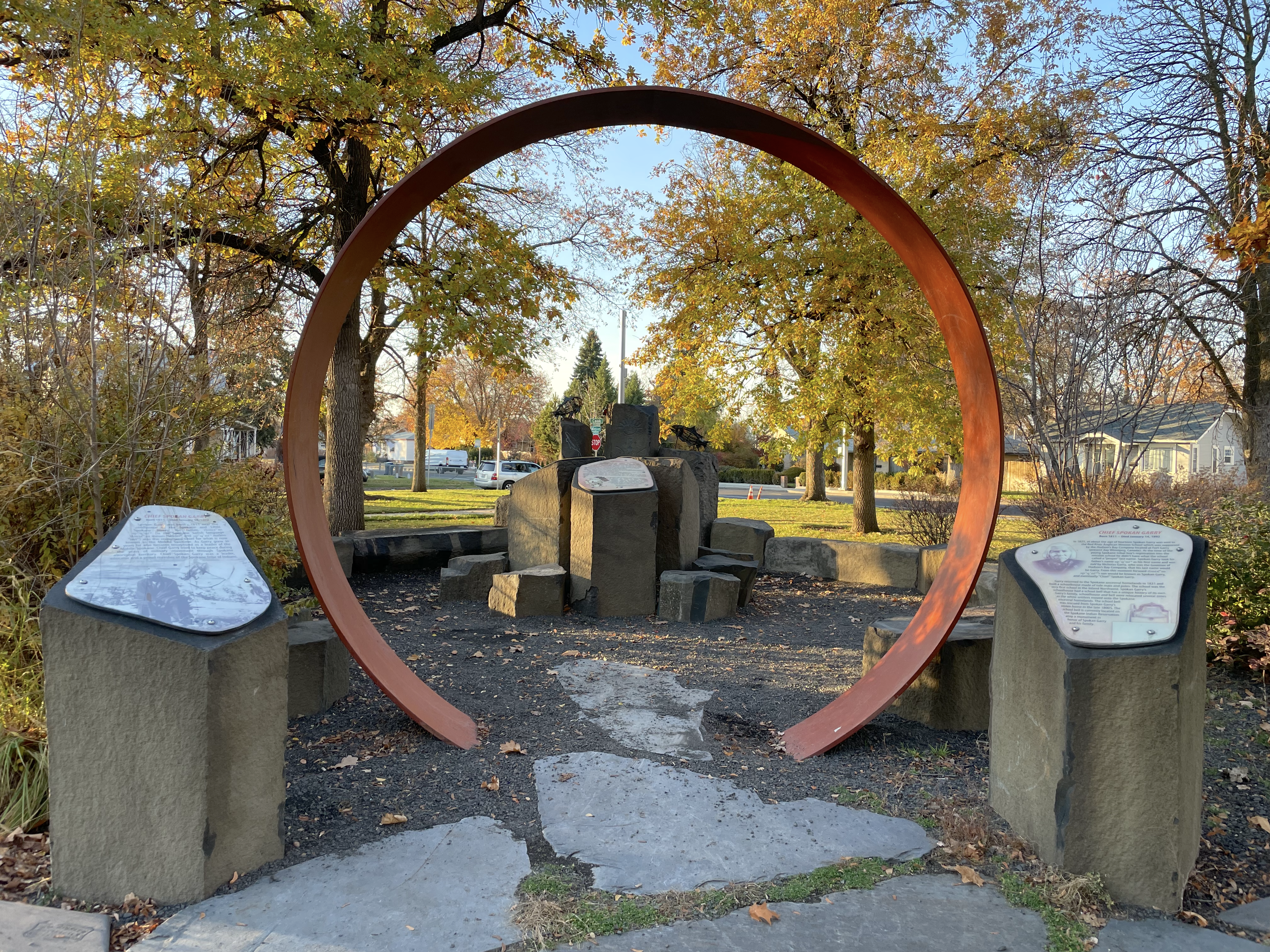
- The Gathering Place monument to Spokane Garry in Chief Garry Park

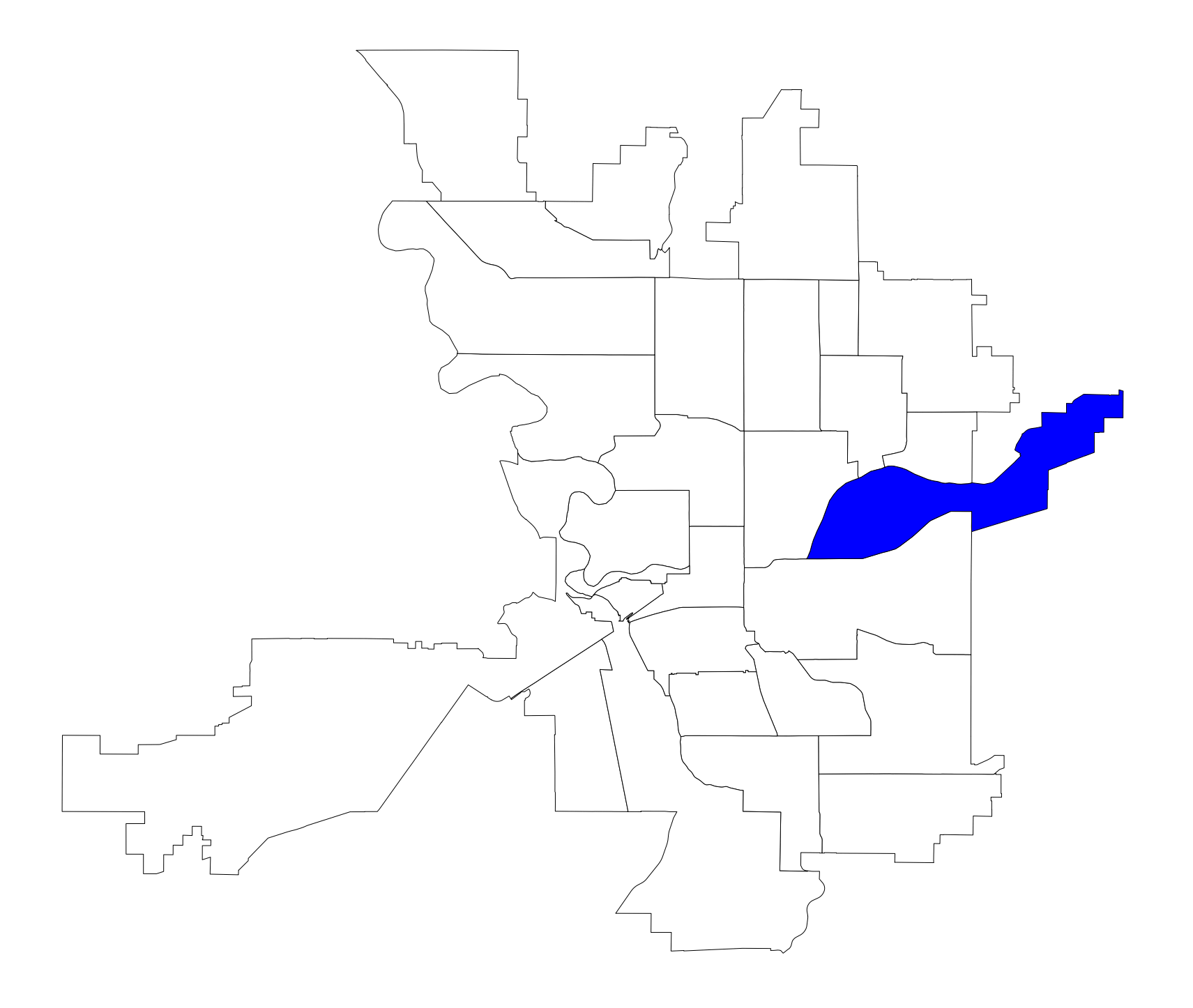
- Location of Chief Garry Park in Spokane
- Coordinates: 47°40′17.1″N 117°22′16.4″W
- Country: United States
- State: Washington
- County: Spokane
- City: Spokane

Population (2017)
  - Total: 6,075

Demographics 2017
  - White: 74.8%
  - Black: 5.9%
  - Latinx: 7.1%
  - Asian: 6.2%
  - Native American: 3.8%
- Time zone: UTC-8 (PST)
  - Summer (DST): UTC-7 (PDT)
- ZIP Codes: 99202 99207
- Area code: 509

Chief Garry Park is a neighborhood in Spokane, Washington. It is located immediately south of the Spokane River. It is named for Spokane Garry and a park that has taken his name. The neighborhood was first established in 1912 but it wasn't until 1932 that it was officially named for Chief Garry.

== Geography ==
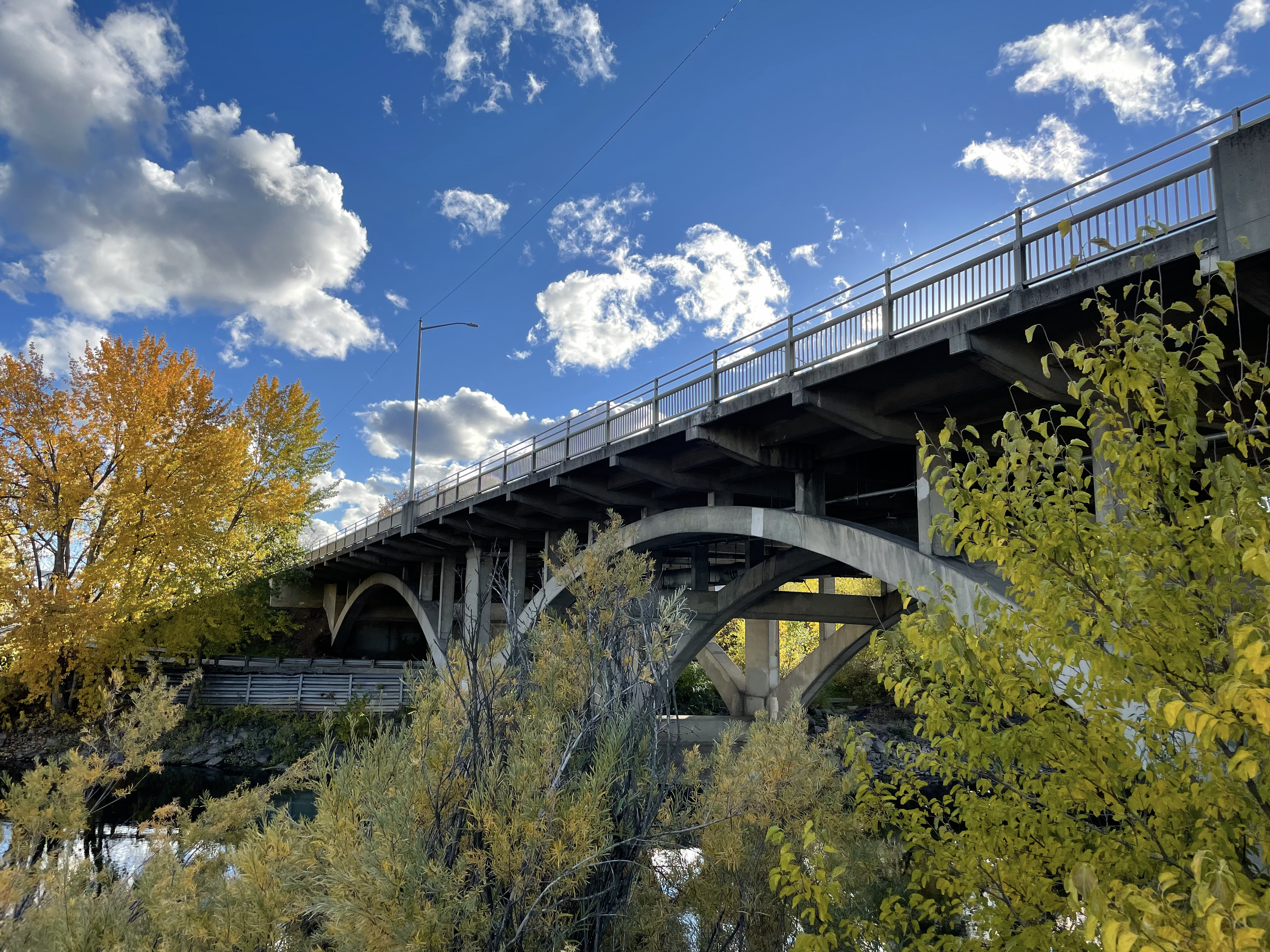
Greene Street crossing the Spokane River from Chief Garry Park

The neighborhood is bounded on the west and north by the Spokane River. The southern border runs along Trent Avenue to Havana Street, at which point it drops a few blocks to the south to follow railroad tracks east to Fancher Road. From Fancher, the boundary zig-zags to the northeast along the edge of Felts Field and delimits the municipal boundary of the City of Spokane where it meets the City of Spokane Valley.

It is an elongated neighborhood that extends more than four miles from the Trent Avenue Bridge in the neighborhood's far southwestern corner to the city limits in the northeast. The bulk of the residential area of the neighborhood centers on Chief Garry Park itself on the west side. The Spokane Community College campus is located at the intersection of Greene and Mission and stretches north to the river. The northeastern half of the neighborhood is dominated by Felts Field.

An exclave of the neighborhood exists at Upriver Park to the north of and across the river from Felts Field. The park is part of the City of Spokane, but surrounded on the north side of the river by unincorporated Spokane County.

== Demographics ==
As of 2017 the population of Chief Garry Park was 6,075 people across 2,363 households, 32.2% of which were households with children. The median household income was $35,264, compared to $44,768 citywide. 13.8% of the population had a bachelor's degree or above and 30.3% had only a high school diploma. People aged 19 and under made up 28.4% of the population and people aged 65 and older made up 8.3% of the population. Persons of color made up 36.1% of the population, compared to 15.1% citywide. 55.7% of households were rentals, compared to 45.4% citywide. Unemployment was at 7.3%, compared to 6.5% citywide. 100% of children qualified for free or reduced school lunch, compared to 54.5% citywide. 82.4% of residents were born in the United States or its territories. Of those who weren't, 35.3% were from Vietnam, 15.5% from Mexico, 10.4% from Turkey and 8.4% from Russia.

== History ==
Chief Garry Park, the park itself, dates to 1912. In 1932 it was officially dedicated and named in honor of Spokane Garry.

The neighborhood is one of Spokane's oldest. Lucias B. Nash, a U.S. District Court Judge, built a home for his family on Tilsey Place overlooking the Spokane River in 1886. The 24 room Queen Anne style home was designed by Nash's wife and was one of the first in Spokane with indoor plumbing. Streetcar lines ran along Mission and Boone Avenues, connecting the neighborhood with Downtown Spokane to the west and the rest of the growing city. The Mission Avenue Bridge was built in 1909 and connected the neighborhood with the Logan Neighborhood and other areas on the north side of the river.

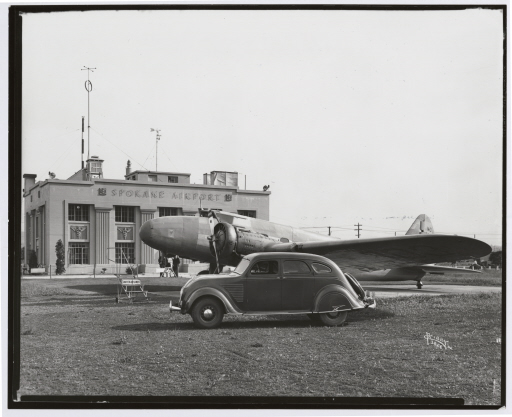
Felts Field in 1935

Expansion into the Parkwater area on the east side of Chief Garry Park occurred between 1900 and 1930, first with the building of homes and then the development of an airport. Parkwater Aviation Field was established there in 1912 and designated as Spokane's official municipal airport in 1920. During the 1920s, Charles Lindbergh landed his famous Spirit of St. Louis at the airport. Since 1927 the airport has been known as Felts Field. In the 1940s and 1950s, during the post-World War II housing boom in the United States, the area between Mission Avenue and the Spokane River was developed into a residential portion of the neighborhood. During those years the development was primarily single-family homes. Since 1970, however, denser multi-family housing has been built in the area, particularly on South Riverton Avenue, which runs along the river. Spokane Community College was established at the intersection of Mission Avenue and Greene Street in 1963 on the site of an existing technical and vocational school.

In May 2020, construction began on the City Line, a bus rapid transit route that will pass through the neighborhood connecting Spokane Community college on the east with Browne's Addition on the west via Gonzaga University and Downtown Spokane. The line will follow Mission Avenue through the neighborhood with stops at Napa Street, the west side of Chief Garry Park, the east side of Chief Garry Park, and its terminus at Spokane Community College. Service is expected to begin in July 2023.

== Education ==
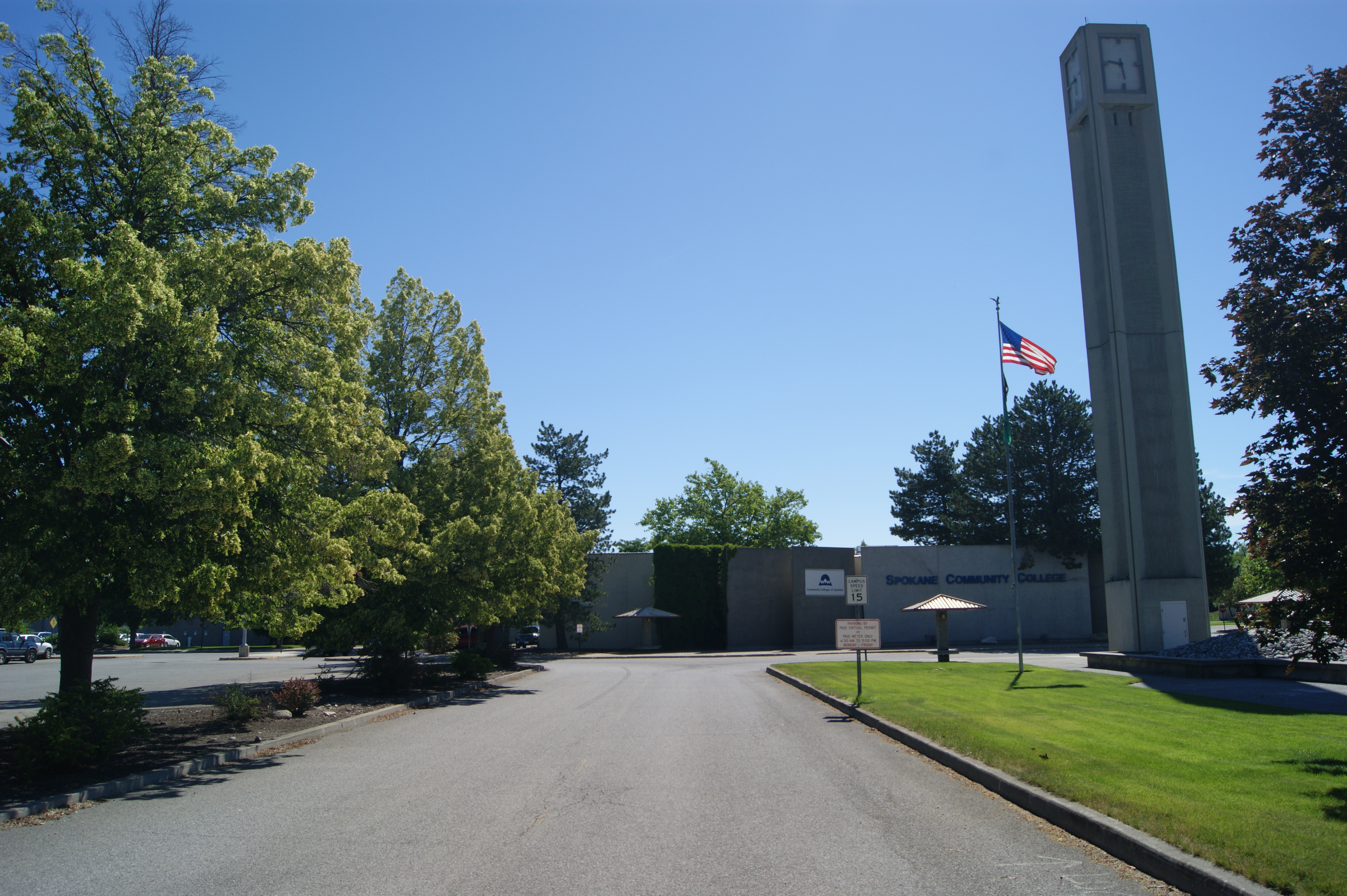
Spokane Community College and its landmark clock tower

The neighborhood is home to Spokane's first, and largest, community college, Spokane Community College.

Stevens Elementary, located in the western area of Chief Garry Park, serves the neighborhood west of Freya and Greene Streets. Cooper Elementary, located in the adjacent Minnehaha neighborhood, serves the areas west of Greene, though those areas are not zoned for residential housing. There is an area of residential zoning in the far east of the neighborhood, which is located within the city limits but not served by Spokane Public Schools like the rest of Chief Garry Park, but is instead served by Orchard Center Elementary in the West Valley School District, which feeds into Centennial Middle School and then West Valley High School. Stevens Elementary feeds into Yasuhara Middle School in the adjacent Logan neighborhood and from there into North Central High School.

== Transportation ==
Aviation services are provided at Felts Field airport in the far eastern portion of the neighborhood.

=== Roads ===
State Route 290, a major highway connecting Spokane to Spokane Valley, follows Trent Avenue through Chief Garry Park.

A shared use path for pedestrians and cyclists runs along the southern bank of the Spokane River from Chief Garry Park's western limit to Felts Field. Pedestrian crossings of the Spokane River are available at Trent Avenue, Iron Bridge, Mission Avenue and Greene Street. The first three cross the river east-to-west into the Logan neighborhood, while the latter crosses south-to-north into the Minnehaha neighborhood.

Connections to the rest of the city's street system are provided by three streets classified as "urban principle arterials." Mission Avenue, Trent Avenue and Greene Street/Freya Street are all classified as such. Napa Street south of Mission is classified as an "urban minor arterial." Trent Avenue carries Washington State Route 290. The transportation situation in the neighborhood will change dramatically with the completion of the North Spokane Corridor. That corridor will carry U.S. Route 395 through and above the neighborhood in what is being called a "skyway."

=== Public transit ===
The Spokane Transit Authority, the region's public transportation provider, serves Chief Garry Park with five fixed schedule bus lines. The City Line's eastern terminus is located at Spokane Community College, from which travels through Chief Garry Park along Mission Avenue before crossing into Logan, East Central, Downtown, and finally to its western terminus at Browne's Addition. The City Line has a fleet of all-electric buses and provide service every 7.5 minutes during peak weekday hours.
