= North Spokane Corridor =

Highway in the U.S. state of Washington

North Spokane Corridor
- U.S. Route 395 North Spokane Corridor
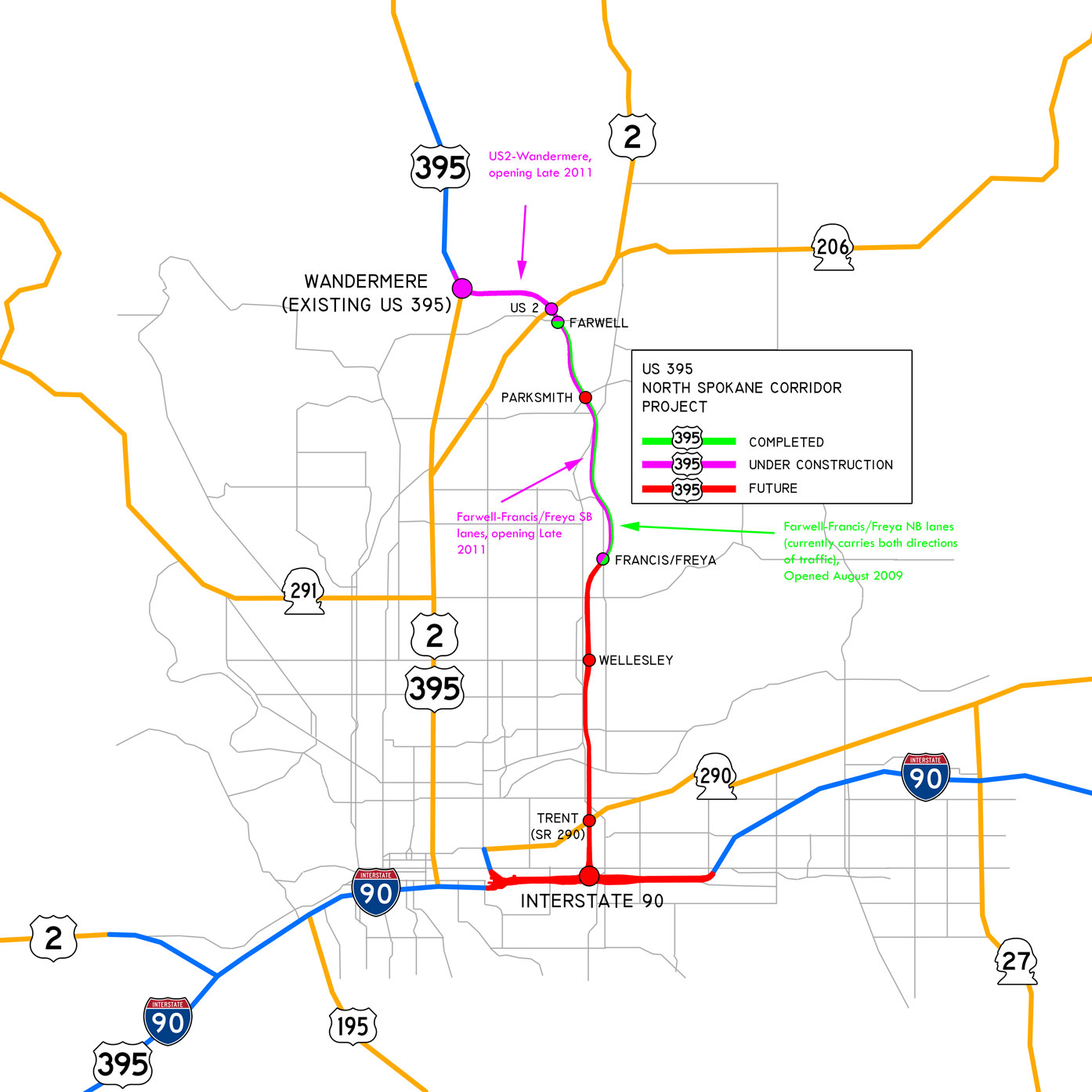
- Planned route for the North Spokane Corridor

Route information
- Maintained by WSDOT
- Length: 6.99 mi (11.25 km) Planned: 10.5 miles (16.9 km)
- Existed: 2009–present
- History: First segment opened August 22, 2009; Planned completion by December 2030

Major junctions
- South end: I-90 / US 395 in Spokane
- SR 290 in Spokane; US 2 in Spokane
- North end: US 395 in Spokane

Location
- Country: United States
- State: Washington
- County: Spokane

Highway system
- United States Numbered Highway System; List; Special; Divided; State highways in Washington; Interstate; US; State; Scenic; Pre-1964; 1964 renumbering; Former
← SR 339	→ SR 397

The U.S. Route 395 North Spokane Corridor (NSC) is a 10.5-mile-long (16.9 km) freeway—with 7 miles (11 km) complete and currently operational—running north–south along the eastern border of Spokane, Washington and parts of unincorporated Spokane County to the north.

The $2.2 billion (2009 dollars) project is designed to improve freight and commuter mobility through the Spokane metropolitan area. As of 2023, only the northern half from Wellesley Avenue to U.S. Route 395 is open to traffic; the southern half received state funding in 2015 and is anticipated to be completed by December 2030.

The project is being managed by the Washington State Department of Transportation (WSDOT) and will ultimately create a freeway with a speed limit of 60 mph (97 km/h) along a new alignment linking Interstate 90 (I-90), to the existing US Route 395 (US 395) 10.5 miles (16.9 km) to the north in the Wandermere area. When completed, the multi-modal facility is expected to have general travel lanes, with right-of-way reserved for a future high-capacity transit system with park-and-ride lots. Additionally, a pedestrian and bicycle trail will run along the entire highway alignment. The project is ranked 19 of 43 on the Congressional High Priority Corridor list of the National Highway System. When completed, the corridor is expected to carry over 150,000 vehicles per day.

== Route description ==
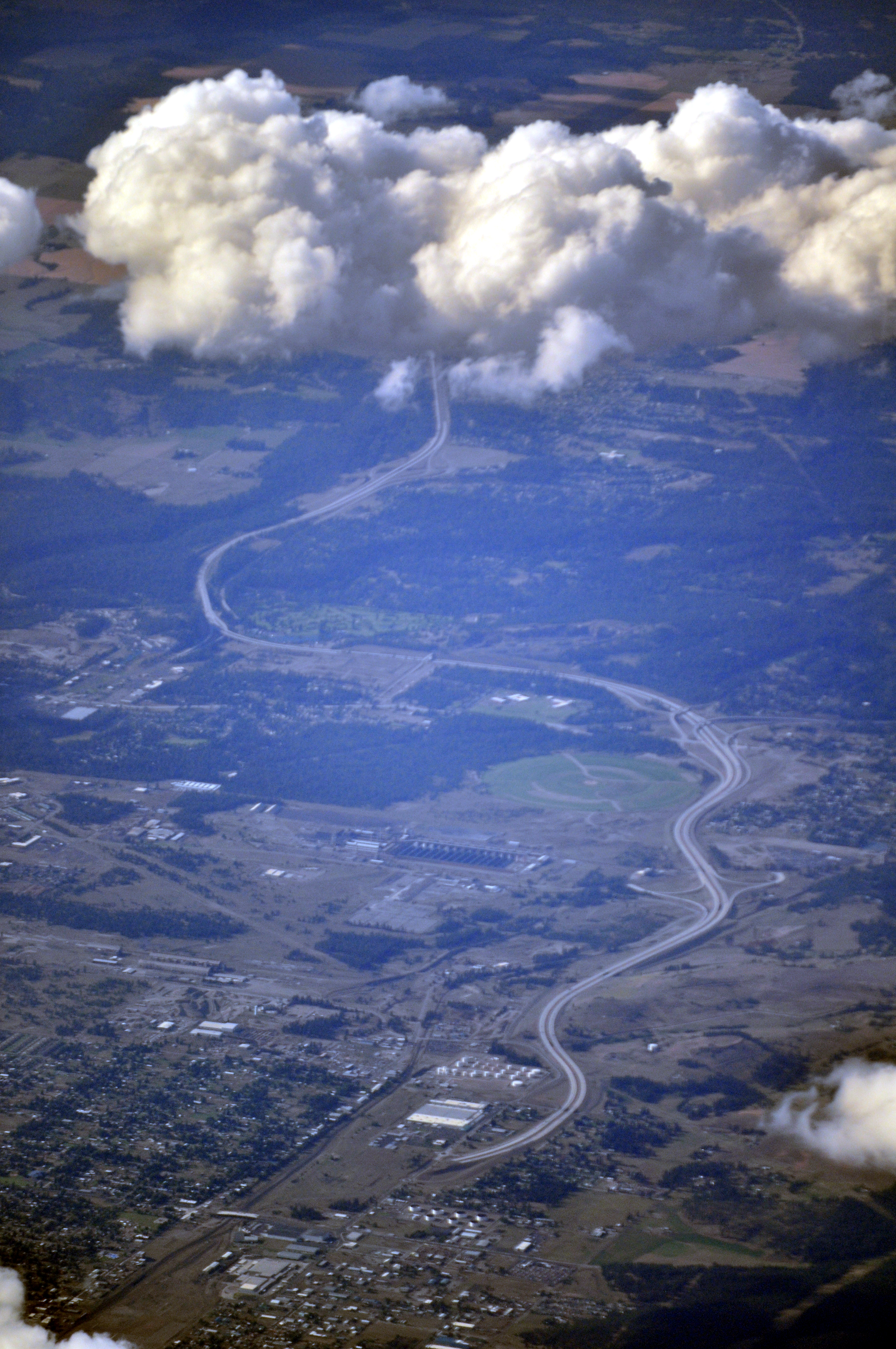
Aerial photograph of the construction of the northern section of the highway north of Francis Ave, 2013

The North Spokane Corridor is part of Washington's state highway system and, upon completion, will fully adopt the US 395 designation. Currently, the WSDOT considers the corridor a spur of US 395 and refers to the roadway as "Future US 395" on its official state highway maps and roadway guide signs.

The ultimate route of the highway runs from I-90, just east of Downtown Spokane, northward about 10.5 miles (16.9 km) meeting the existing US 395 at Wandermere, just north of Spokane. The northern end of the corridor was constructed as a seamless connection to the existing US 395, rerouting the existing highway onto the North Spokane Corridor. The construction of this interchange replaced the existing alignment of US 395 that flowed directly onto Division Street, with an exit to Division off of the freeway. Because the corridor's northern end ties in with a portion of US 395 that was redeveloped into a limited-access highway in the late 1990s (with the construction of a new bridge over Little Spokane River, a full interchange at Hatch Road, and the creation of median-separated lanes extending 3.3 miles beyond Hatch), the completion of the corridor will create a fully controlled-access highway from the vicinity of Hatch Road to I-90.

The North Spokane Corridor is planned to bypass the busy Division Street corridor. The new freeway will carry the US 395 designation and run about one mile (1.6 km) east of where it was originally planned in the 1960s and 1970s.

While the new freeway would also be a good routing for US 2 to bypass Spokane, that highway is scheduled to stay on its current routing in order to keep most of Division Street in the state highway system. Nevertheless, it will be easy for motorists on US 2 to avoid this by using the freeway instead of Division Street. On the north side, a full interchange has been constructed at US 2 in the Mead area near Farwell Road. This route uses the entire North Spokane Corridor except the northernmost one mile (1.6 km) section between US 2 and Wandermere. Division street between the "Y" (historical US 395 and US 2 split) and Wandermere will no longer be in the state highway system. This includes about one-half mile of the new section of Division Street just north of Farwell Road.

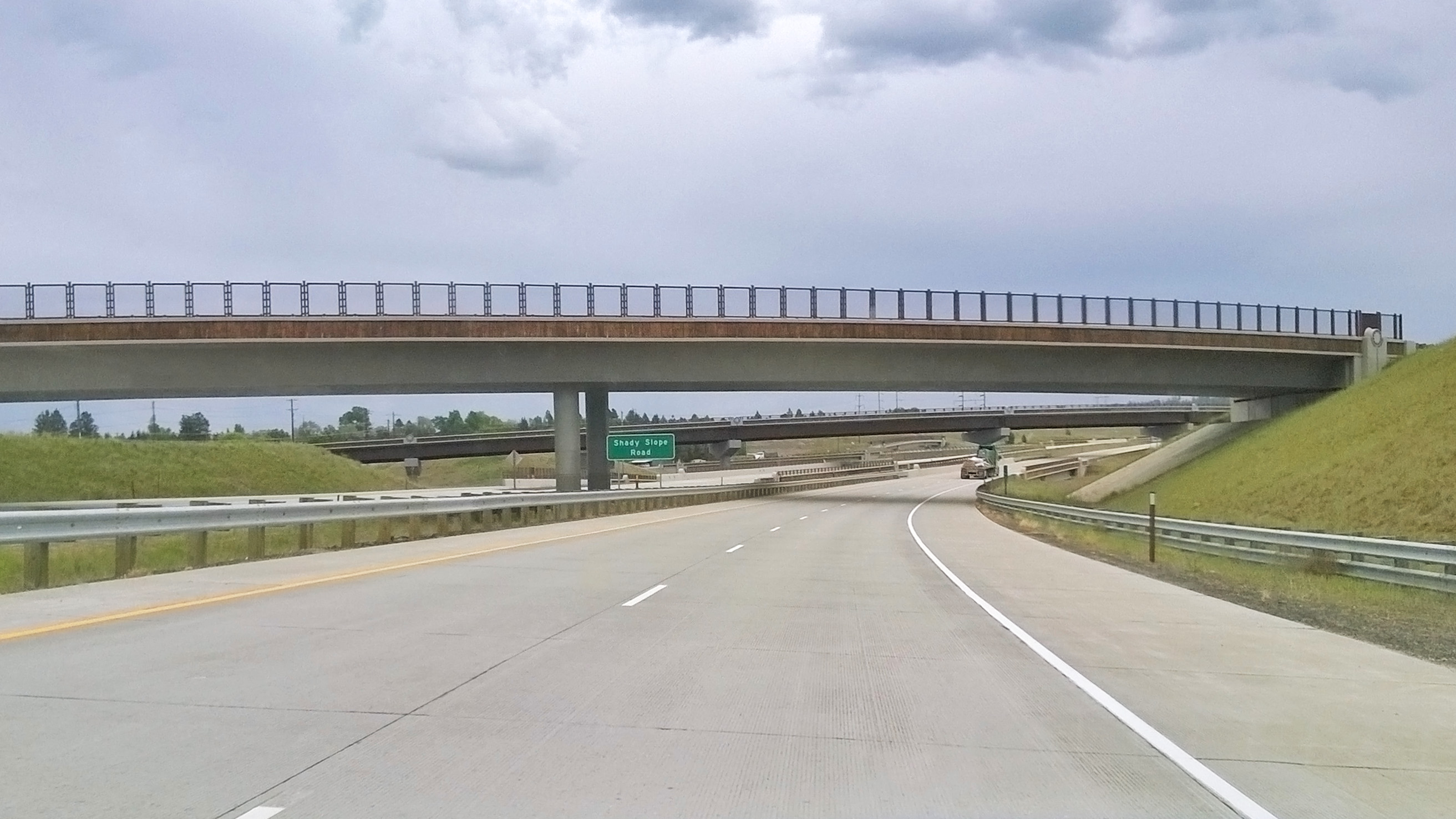
US 395 NSC near Shady Slope Road and the US 2 Interchange

== History ==
Plans for a North Spokane Freeway date back to 1946. Earlier projects were cancelled due to other priorities and local opposition. The current project began construction in 2001.

=== Early plans ===
The idea of having a freeway run northward through Spokane was originally conceived in 1946 after the Spokane traffic survey that year. The city of Spokane needed some sort of a major north–south traffic facility to relieve congestion. After several reports and studies, the first plans for the freeway were released in 1956 with an estimated cost of just $13 million, however, those plans were quickly shelved in 1958 as the construction of the Interstate Highway System was prioritized over the construction of the north–south freeway. As a result, cheaper alternatives, such as one-way paired couplets, were discussed.

In 1964, the Spokane Metropolitan Area Transportation Study (SMATS) was formed to fulfill requirements of Federal Highway Act of 1962, and in 1970, along with the Department of Highways, released the "Corridor Study for North Spokane and North Suburban Area Freeway". It recommended a north–south freeway along Hamilton and Nevada streets (the corridor between Nevada and Helena). Though a full freeway interchange was built connecting Hamilton Street with I-90 (exit 282/282A, connecting to State Route 290 (SR 290)), residents successfully blocked any further construction through this area.

=== Northern section construction ===
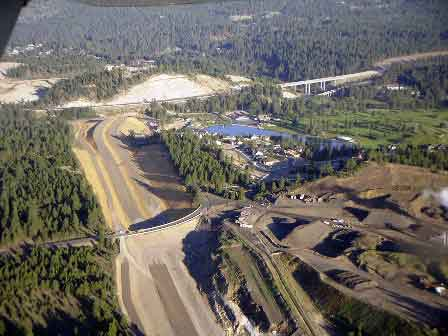
View of a graded section of the NSC at the north terminus of the project

After 33 years of further discussions and proposals, the final environmental impact statement (FEIS) for the current version of the project was approved in April 1997. The first phase of the NSC, consisting of grading between Hawthorne Road and US 2, broke ground in August 2001. The first ribbon cutting ceremony (for a 3.5-mile (5.6 km) segment of lanes between the Francis/Freya and Farwell interchanges) occurred on the eighth anniversary of the ground breaking, August 22, 2009. To reduce costs, the scope of construction was reduced in 2008, reducing the northmost portion from six lanes to four, eliminating part of the interchange at Wellesley Avenue, and constructing the freeway at ground level, rather than below. This reduced the cost of that portion from $720 million to $285 million, while still allowing for those improvements later.

On June 13, 2012, the NSC opened a new section from the newly constructed interchange at US 2 to the new Wandermere/US 395 interchanges and lanes that link them, creating a free-flowing freeway segment from the US 395 interchange to the Francis/Freya interchange. All six lanes between US 2 and Francis/Freya are now completed and operational. This segment was completed in 2012 and includes the southbound lane section and a second roundabout for southbound traffic at Freya Street. The final project on the north half of the 10-mile route was the Parksmith Road Interchange. The new interchange, near the community of Mead, was opened in October 2012. The freeway is now fully built from the Freya interchange to the Wandermere interchange. Commuters are also expected to use the newly opened segment as a faster way to access Bigelow Gulch, which leads to Argonne Road, where it leads to I-90. Traffic on Bigelow Gulch Rd is expected to increase.

In Spokane's East Central district, the property acquisition process has been ongoing since June 2010 and includes the acquisition and demolition of 606 homes, businesses and industrial buildings.

The first project in the south half of the corridor, the Francis Avenue Bridge replacement, has been completed and opened to traffic. The project consisted of removing the existing four-lane, 160-foot-long (49 m) bridge and constructing a 455-foot-long (139 m), five-lane structure. The new bridge provides enough space for the future freeway lanes and railway lines to pass under Francis Avenue. The Francis Avenue Bridge opened to traffic in November 2013.

In June 2012, WSDOT received TIGER Grant funding for the next project, which includes further construction of the Children of the Sun Trail into Hillyard, plus realignment of the railroad mainline and spur under the new structure. This phase of construction also includes two new freeway bridges and two new pedestrian/bike access bridges.

=== Southern section construction ===
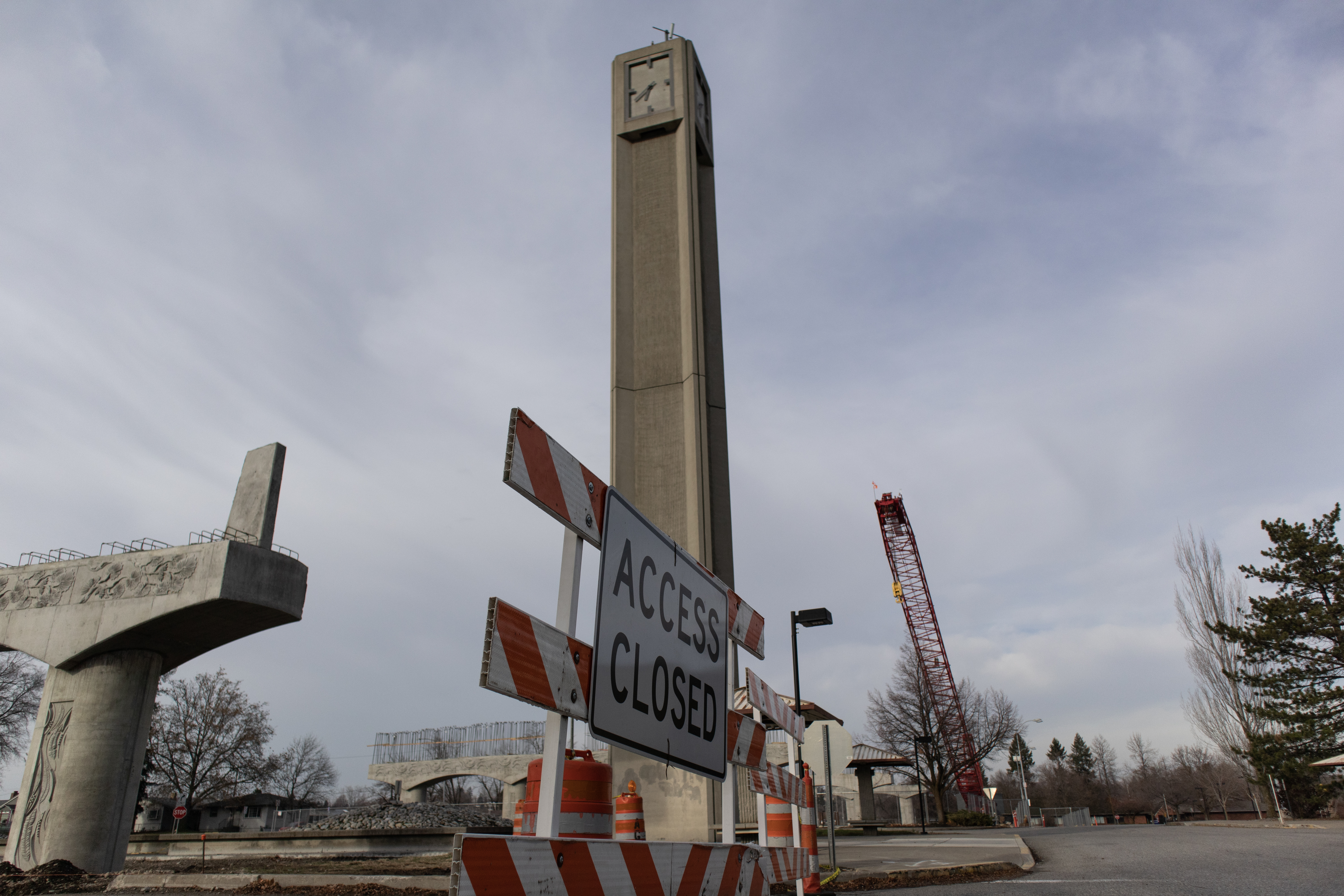
The North Spokane Corridor overpass under construction near Spokane Community College

In July 2015, the Connecting Washington transportation package was signed by Governor Jay Inslee, bringing $879 million in state funding for the completion of the North Spokane Corridor project. Construction on the southern half began in early 2017 with work on the Freya Street overpass and is the whole project is anticipated to be completed by 2027 or 2029, depending on funding. Grading and paving of a section between Freya Street and Central Avenue was completed in September 2019, but remains closed to traffic.

In October 2019, the second realignment of the BNSF Railway tracks began to make way of further construction of the NSC; one month later, Wellesley Avenue was closed off to traffic. Construction of the new segment began in May 2021 and the railroad realignment was completed in August. The section between Freya Street and Wellesley Avenue was opened to northbound traffic on November 16, 2023, extending the freeway by 1.5 miles (2.4 km) and into the city limits of Spokane. The section's southbound lanes opened the following day.

In 2023, WSDOT requested public feedback on two potential designs for the I-90 interchange (the final segment of the North Spokane Corridor) at the future southern terminus of the NSC. On July 13, 2023, WSDOT announced that it had chosen alternative 1. The community chose this option due to it having a smaller infrastructure footprint with greater potential for placing pedestrian bridges for future development. Construction on this segment is expected to start in March 2026 and be completed by late 2030.

== Impacts ==
The highway is expected to significantly improve traffic through north Spokane. In particular, the highway will allow trucks to avoid congested Division Street, formerly the only north–south truck route through the city. By moving cars from congested streets to a freeway, WSDOT predicts that it will reduce auto emissions by 3.6% annually and save a million gallons of fuel a year. It will also reduce predicted traffic growth on Interstate 90, as new residents move to the North Spokane area instead of elsewhere along the Interstate.

There are 62 known or suspected hazardous waste sites in the freeway's path.

A 1997 report by WSDOT noted that the construction of the southern portion of the freeway will require the demolition of over 500 homes and 100 business, necessitating the relocation of over 1,000 residents. Many of these homes and business are in the poorest and most ethnically diverse neighborhoods of the city. WSDOT purchased many properties in Hillyard and other neighborhoods in 2002. Businesses have been allowed to remain operating until construction actually begins. Ziggy's store closed on November 20, 2010, after 45 years in business because of the construction of the freeway. Homes and churches have also been relocated.

Based on history with the construction of Interstate 90, it is forecast that the North Spokane Corridor will result in substantial land-use changes in the area. The completion of I-90 resulted in growth in eastern suburbs that were once small towns, while many neighborhoods in the center of the city experienced poverty and decline. It is predicted that growth and development will occur near the interchanges of the new freeway while areas near connecting sections will remain poor neighborhoods. Whether modern growth management laws will prevent sprawl in northern suburbs is far from certain. The environmental impact statement predicted more development in Pend Oreille County and Deer Park north of the city. The Spokane Community College clock tower was slated for demolition for the freeway but the alignment was adjusted to prevent from the demolition from happening.

The Spokane Transit Authority (STA) is planning a bus rapid transit (BRT) line for the Division corridor, similar to the City Line but with dedicated BAT lanes. The opening of the BRT line is contingent on the North Spokane Corridor opening to reduce traffic volumes on Division Street. With the delays in funding for the North Spokane Corridor, the Division Bus Rapid Transit project is also delayed.

== Exit list ==
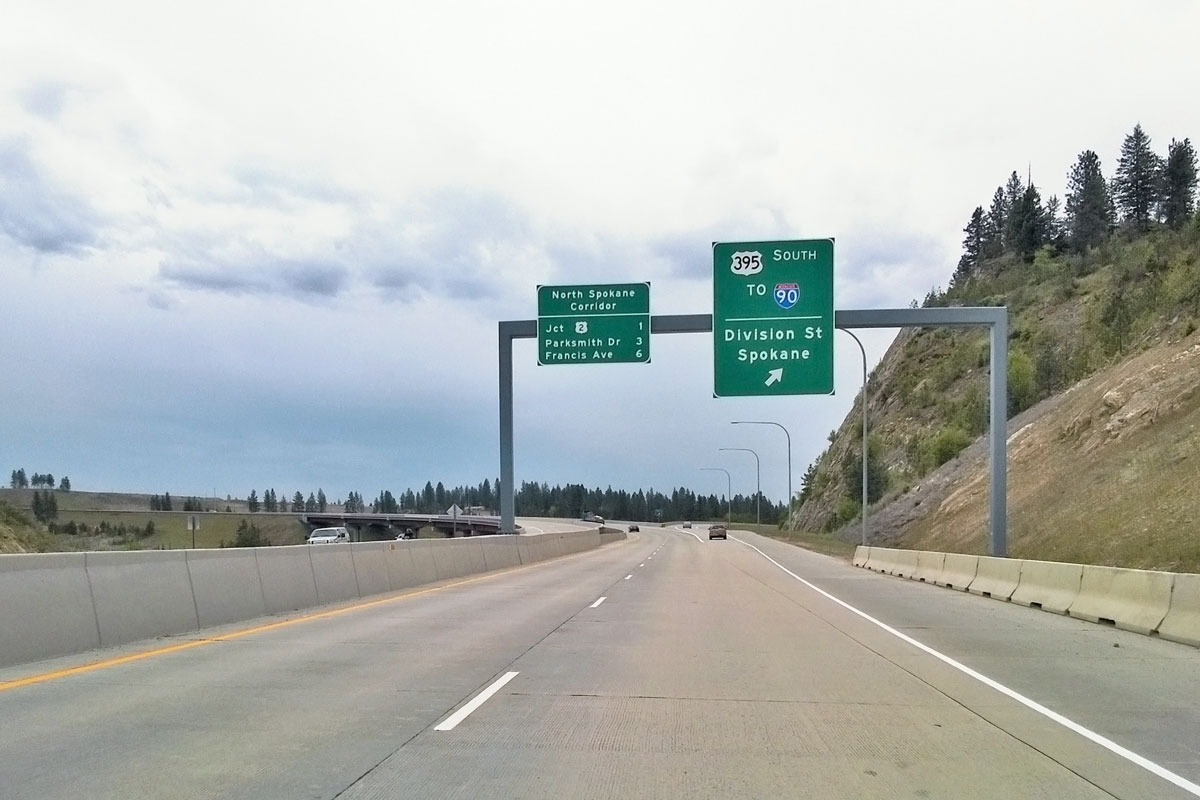
Looking southbound on US 395 from where the North Spokane Corridor splits from Division Street

The entire route is in Spokane County.

Location	mi	km	Exit	Destinations	Notes
Spokane				I-90 / US 395 south	Planned southern terminus
Spokane				SR 290 (Trent Avenue)	Southbound exit and northbound entrance; construction starts in late 2026
Spokane	160.46	258.24		Wellesley Avenue	Southern terminus of built section
Spokane	161.97	260.67		Francis Avenue (via Freya Street)	Connects to Francis via Freya Street
Mead	164.52	264.77		Parksmith Drive	Connects to Division via East Hawthorne Road
Mead	165.72	266.70		US 2 west / Farwell Road	
Mead	165.93	267.04		US 2 east – Newport	Northbound exit at US 2 and southbound exit at Shady Slope Road
Spokane County	167.45	269.48		US 395 north (North Division Street)	Northern terminus
1.000 mi = 1.609 km; 1.000 km = 0.621 mi: Incomplete access; Unopened
