= City Line (Spokane, Washington) =

Bus rapid transit line in Spokane, Washington, United States

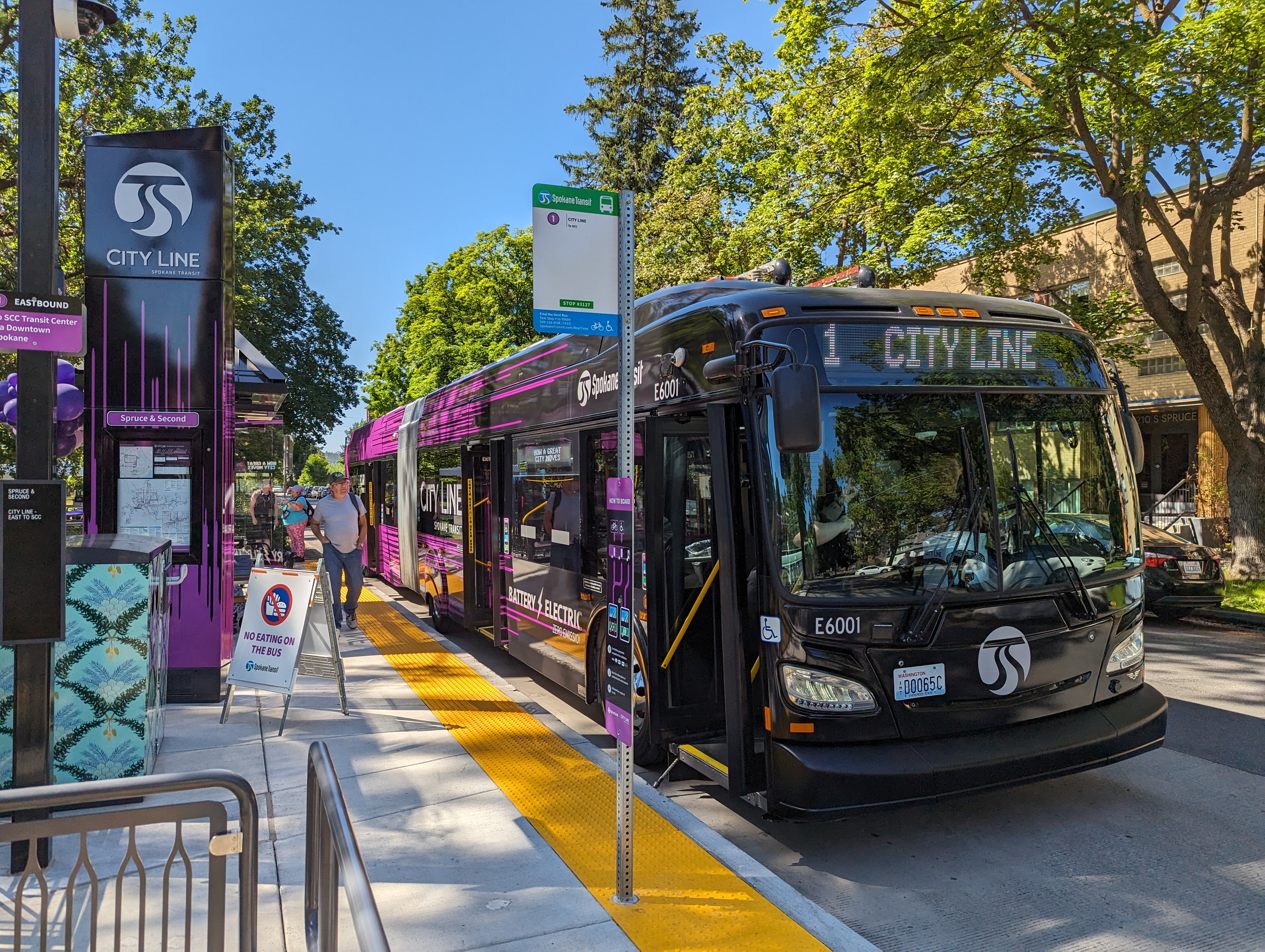
- A City Line bus at Spruce & Second station in July 2023

Overview
- System: Spokane Transit Authority
- Operator: Spokane Transit Authority
- Garage: Boone Northwest
- Vehicle: New Flyer Xcelsior XE60 battery-electric articulated buses
- Livery: Black and purple
- Status: In service
- Began service: July 15, 2023

Routes
- Routes: Spokane Transit Route 1
- Locale: Spokane, Washington
- Start: Browne's Addition
- Via: STA Plaza, University District, Gonzaga University, Chief Garry Park
- End: Spokane Community College Transit Center
- Length: 6 miles (10 km)
- Stations: 25

Service
- Frequency: Weekday peaks: 7.5 minutes Off-peak and weekends: 10-15 minutes Early morning/late nights: 15-30 minutes
- Daily ridership: 2,400 (weekday, March 2024)
- Ridership: 766,115 (2025)

The City Line is a bus rapid transit (BRT) line in Spokane, Washington, United States, that opened on July 15, 2023. The 6-mile-long (9.7 km) route, which is operated by the Spokane Transit Authority, runs from Spokane's Browne's Addition neighborhood, through Downtown Spokane and the University District, including the WSU Health Sciences campus and Gonzaga University, before ending at the Spokane Community College campus in the Chief Garry Park neighborhood. The project budget as of 2023 was $92.2 million.

== History ==
=== Origins and planning ===
==== Early fixed-rail streetcar concept ====
The idea of constructing a form of high-capacity transit system to serve central areas in and around Downtown Spokane began in the late 1990s with an updated visioning document for Downtown Spokane calling for the development of a modern streetcar line, harkening back to Spokane's early 20th century history when numerous streetcars and trolleys ran through the city's core.

By the early 2000s three local agencies, the Downtown Spokane Partnership, the Spokane Regional Transportation Council, and Spokane Transit Authority, teamed up to advance discussions of developing a streetcar system in Downtown Spokane. The group was intrigued by the potential of a streetcar system spurring transit-oriented development in Spokane, similar to the market response to the Portland Streetcar in Portland, Oregon, which had opened a few years prior. Early visions had a streetcar system serving areas in and around the Downtown Spokane core, including the Browne's Addition neighborhood, Spokane Veterans Memorial Arena, Riverpoint Higher Education Park, and medical district on Spokane's Lower South Hill.

===== Feasibility study =====
In 2005, the vision to develop a streetcar line was officially adopted as a project by Spokane Transit Authority and the agency commissioned a streetcar feasibility study in partnership with other local transportation and planning agencies. The report, titled Spokane Streetcar Feasibility Study, was released in March 2006 and studied a number of topics related to installing a streetcar line in Spokane, including potential routes, alignments, vehicles, costs, and urban development potential.

The study identified five potential alignments, many of which utilized multiple lines. All five options included a route running west to east, from Browne's Addition, through Downtown, to the University District, which is ultimately reflected in part of the City Line's final, single-line alignment.

==== Concept development ====
Public workshops and a series of meetings with stakeholders were held from 2010 through early 2011 to identify preferred mode and route alternatives for the new line. The Spokane City Council voted in July 2011 to identify a locally preferred alternative of implementing a tire-based electric trolleybus system, in lieu of a more expensive track-based streetcar system, and a route from the Browne's Addition neighborhood toward Spokane Community College through Downtown Spokane and the nearby University District. The final alignment most closely resembles the southern west–east line identified in Alignment Alternative B.

==== Evolution to bus rapid transit ====
By 2014, plans to use a modern electric trolley as the mode of transportation shifted to using battery electric buses instead due to the lower costs—no overhead wires would need to be constructed—and the rapidly developing capability and reliability of electric vehicles.

=== Funding and costs ===
The City Line's final estimated development costs of $92.2 million are funded through a variety of local, state, and federal sources.

Costs during the project's earlier stages were initially estimated to be around $72 million. $3.575 million of that amount went toward the project's planning and design and were funded by state and federal sources. In 2015, the Washington State Legislature allocated $15 million toward the project. At the time, the intent was that the remainder of that $72 million would be covered through a federal grant, which Spokane Transit applied for in September 2017. STA was awarded its $53.4 million request from the Federal Transit Administration (FTA) Small Starts Grant in April 2019, which would have fully funded the project when combined with the earlier allocation by the Washington State Legislature in 2015.

However, due to cost escalation since the initial planning and grant applications began, the cost estimate had increased to between $85.7 and $92.2 million. To address the shortfall, the Spokane Transit Authority board authorized in July 2019 a $20.2 million local match as part of the transit agency's agreement with the FTA to accept the federal grant.

The line's operating costs are covered by fare revenue and sales-tax revenue approved in 2016 as part of STA's Proposition 1 to improve transit service throughout the Spokane area.

As of May 16, 2023, the project was projected to cost $78.3 million, $13.9 million under the $92.2 million budget. In July 2023, the STA board voted to direct the unused local funds to the agency's next bus rapid transit project, Division Street BRT.

=== Naming ===
The project was conceived under the working title "Central City Line" and was officially named the City Line at the FTA grant signing ceremony on January 21, 2020. The line is numbered as route 1 with all high performance corridors using single digit route numbers.

=== Construction ===
Major construction of the line's components, including roadway improvements along the route, supporting infrastructure, and boarding stations, began on May 1, 2020 and continued through 2021. Prior to start of this phase, Spokane Transit completed upgrades at some of its existing facilities that will ultimately enable and support City Line operations, including alterations to boarding zones at the STA Plaza, reconstruction of the Spokane Community College Transit Center, and constructing a new garage at STA's main campus that will house, service, and recharge the City Line's electric battery electric fleet when not in use.

Construction of City Line was divided into two phases. The first phase, which concluded in May 2022, addressed infrastructure including roadway improvements, communications conduit, and building the concrete station platforms. The second phase of construction began in July 2022, and focused on the construction of the station shelters and amenities.

==== Delay ====
In October 2021, just 7 months before its originally-scheduled May 2022 opening, Spokane Transit Authority announced that the opening of City Line would be delayed to July 2023 due to supply chain shortages in the materials, specifically rolled steel tubes, needed to construct the station shelters. Before the delay was announced, Spokane Transit had evaluated several options to open City Line on schedule, which included launching service without station shelters constructed to changing the station designs to utilize materials not affected by the shortage. However, in order to preserve and deliver the original vision and rider experience of City Line that was presented to the Spokane community, it was ultimately decided to keep the station designs as-is and wait for the availability of the material to construct the station shelters.

In late 2021, Spokane Transit installed a full-scale construction mockup of a protypical City Line station shelter at its Moran Station Park and Ride on Spokane's South Hill. The mockup provided opportunities to train installers on installation processes and conduct a design assessment before installation of the actual shelters along the route. Only minor design adjustments were determined to be necessary as a result of the mockup process, and the mockup was later repurposed into a functioning shelter for the Moran Station Park and Ride.

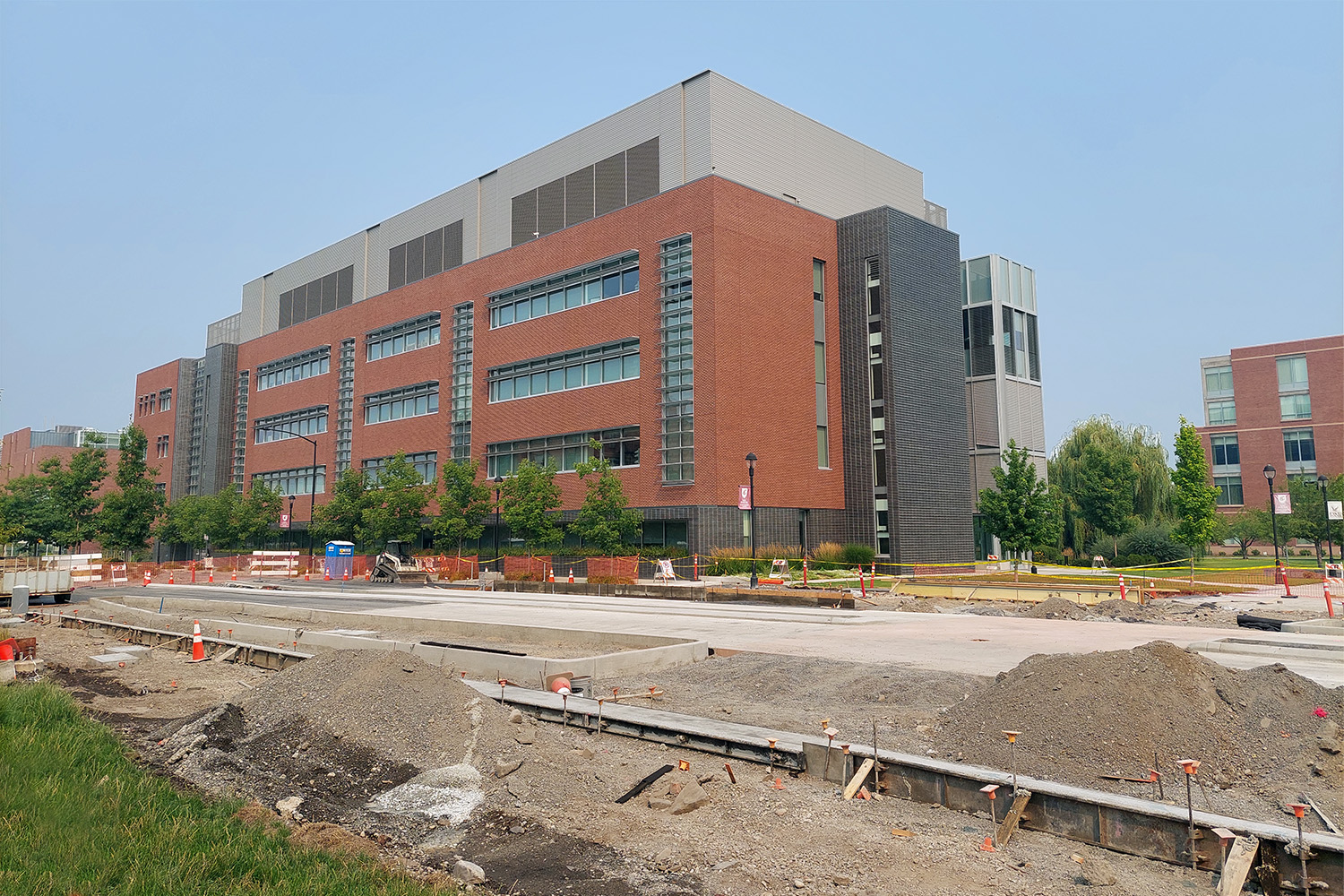
Spokane Falls Boulevard at WSU Spokane Station, which is an island station featuring a bike lane bypass

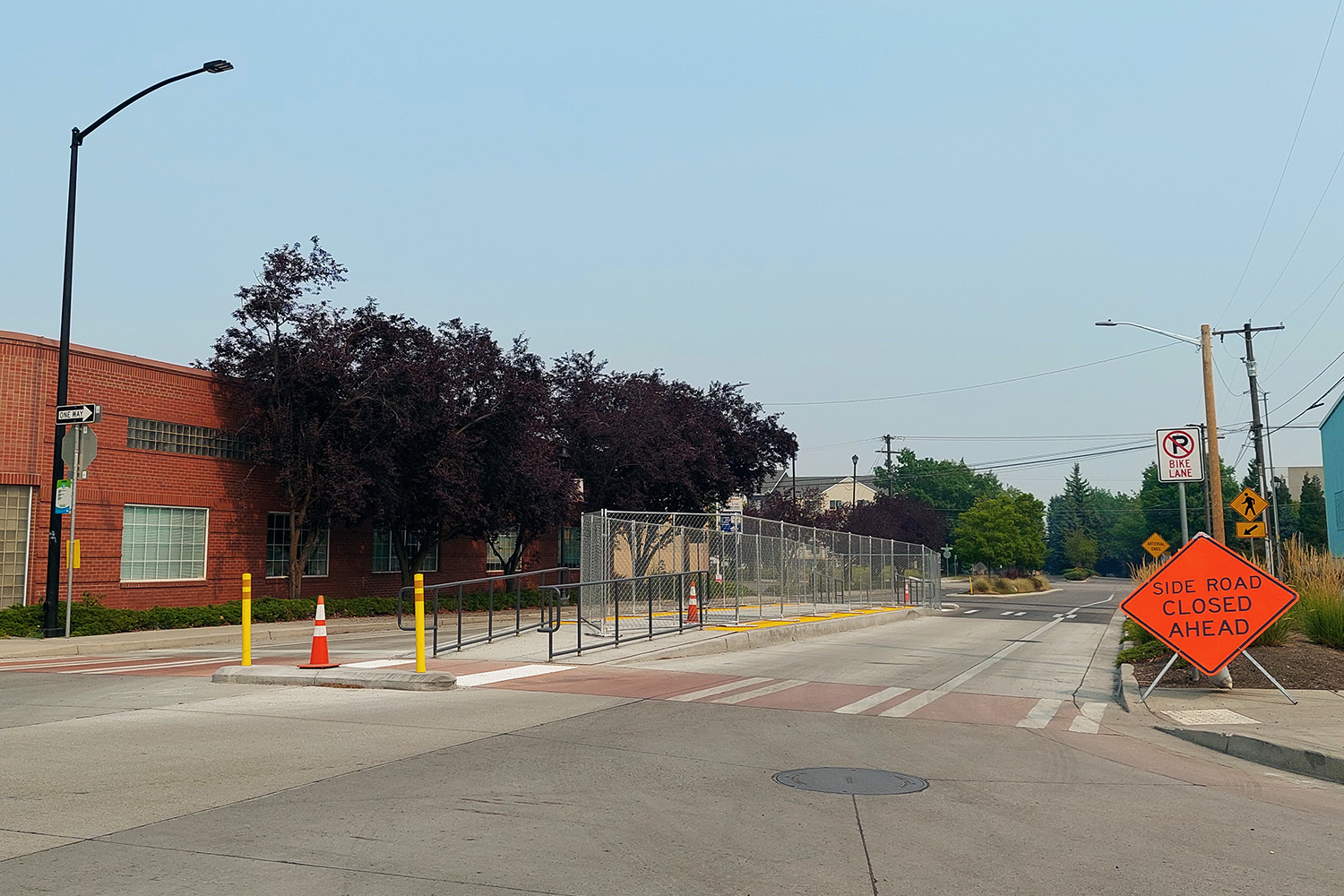
Main & Pine Station, on the WSU Spokane campus, which is a center island station

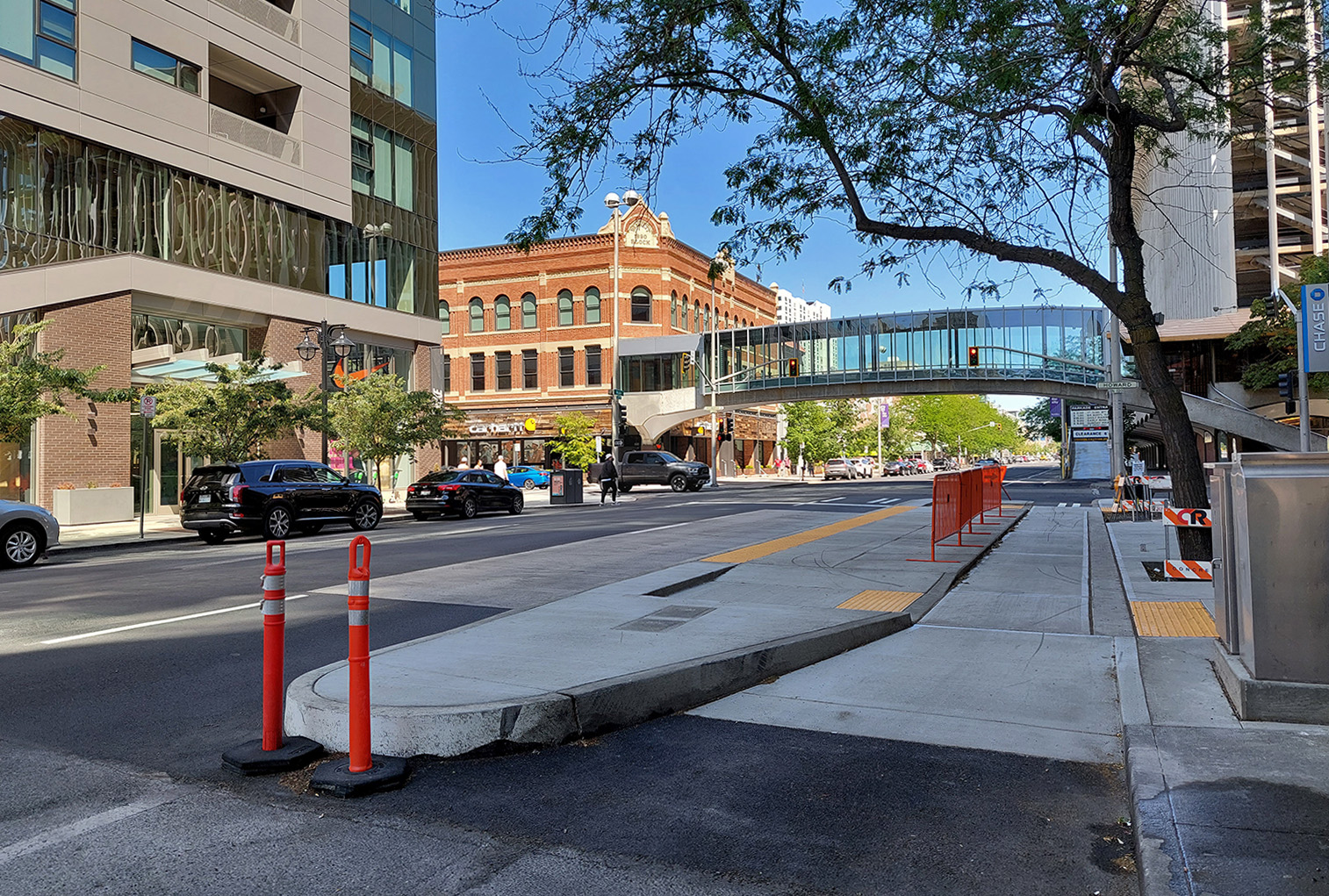
Main & Howard Station, in Downtown Spokane, which is an island station featuring a bike lane bypass

Construction progress on City Line stations in July 2021. Spokane Transit constructed all platforms along the route first before returning with passenger shelter and amenity installation.

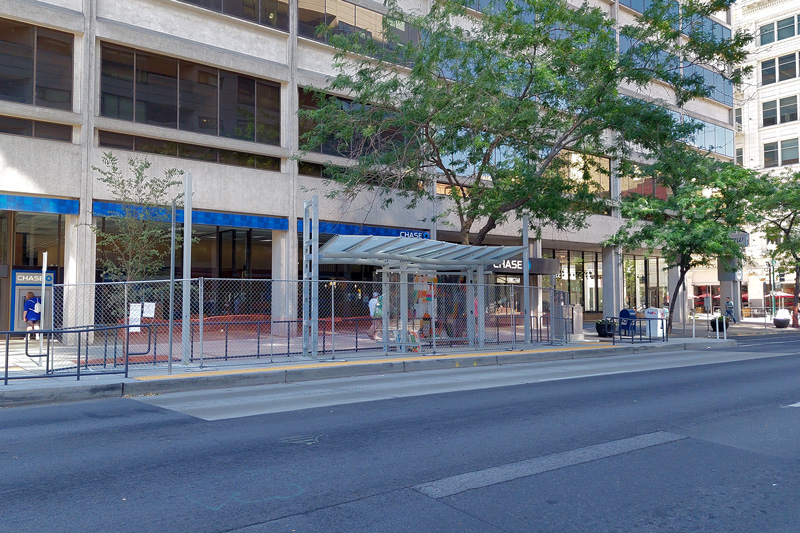
Structural frame and art panels of the Mission & Howard station

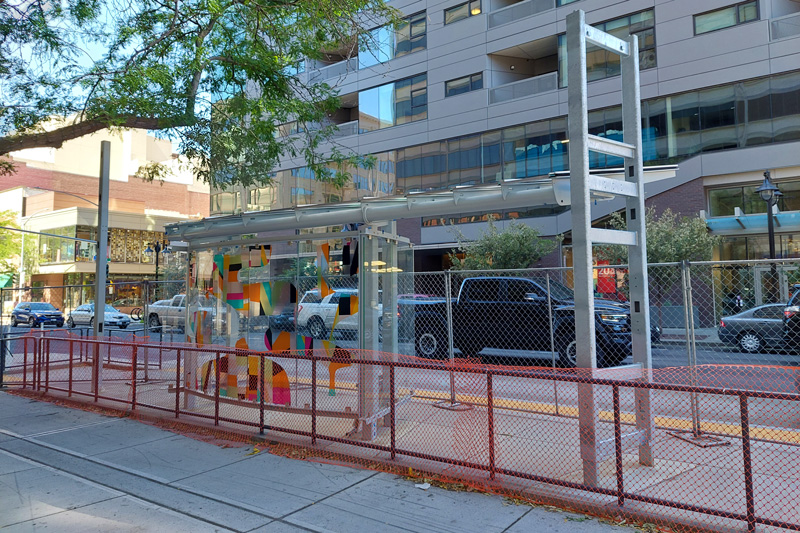
Each City Line station features shelter windscreens with unique art by local Spokane artists that reflects the local neighborhood.

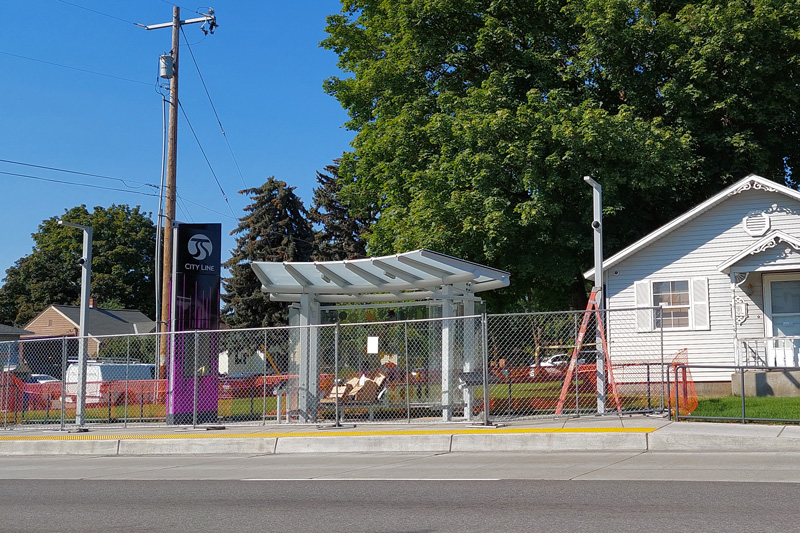
Westbound station at Mission & Regal begins to show signs of City Line branding.

Construction progresses on City Line stations in September 2022. Construction varies by stages across the line.

==== Testing ====
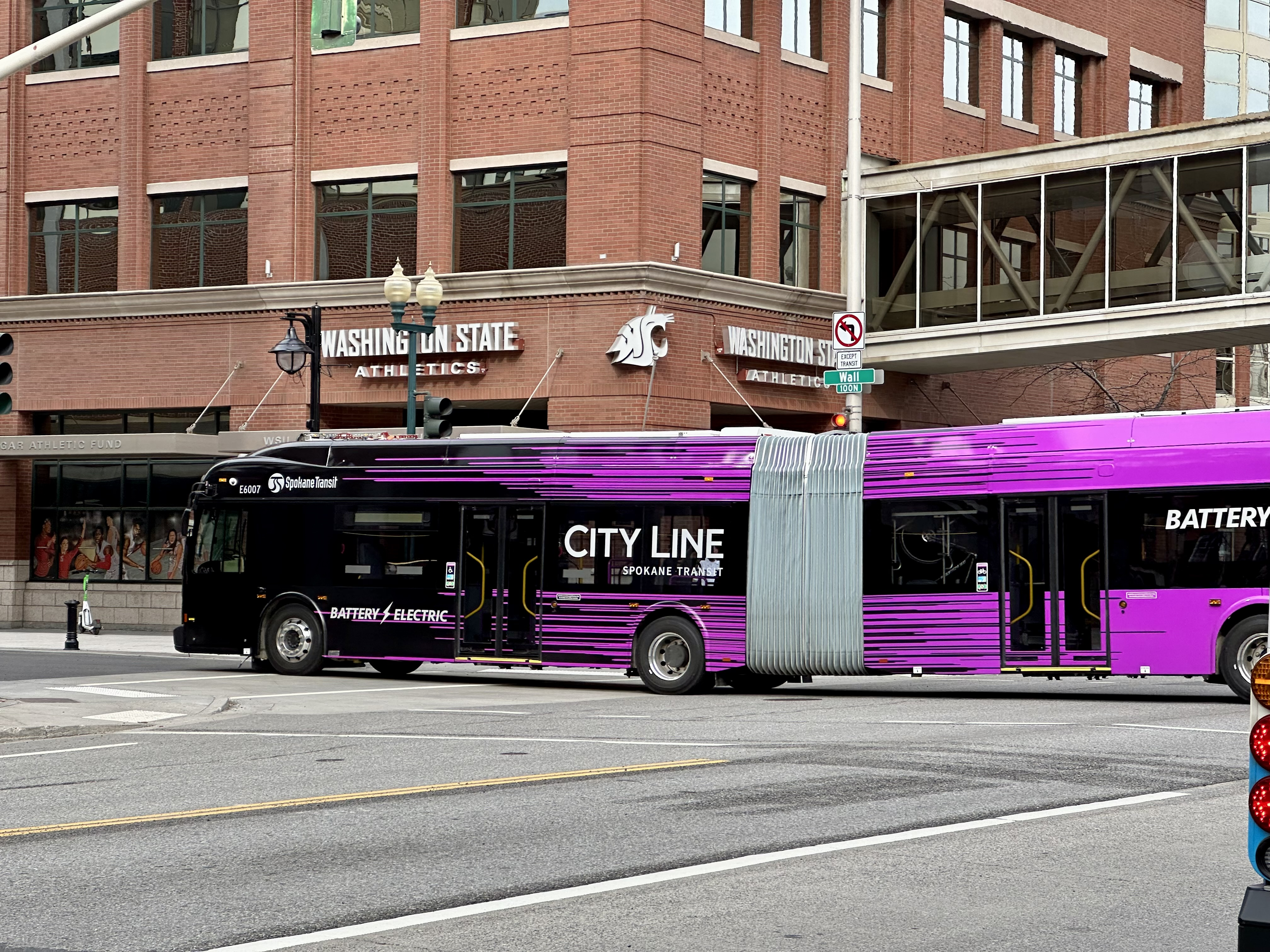
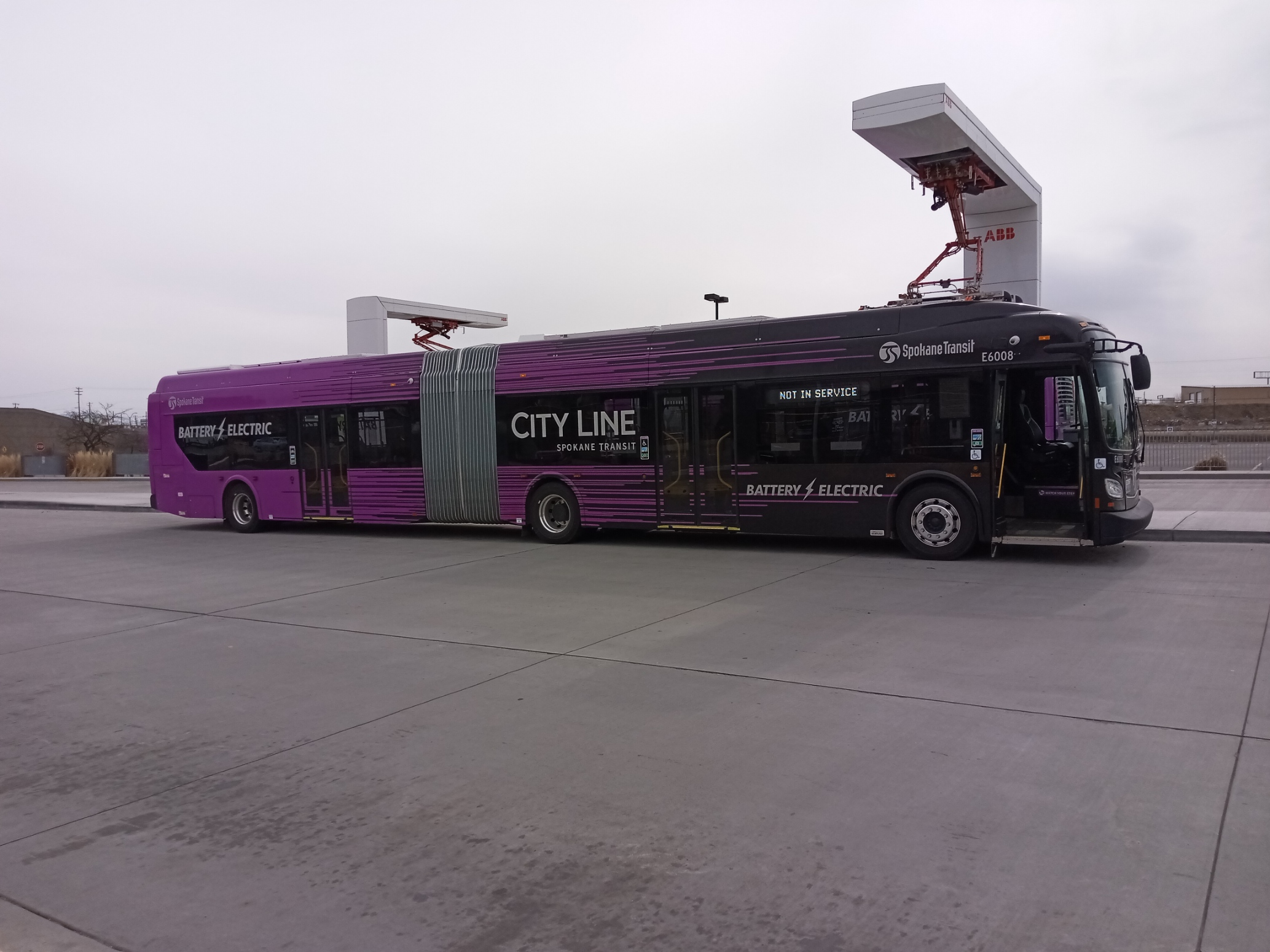
City Line testing, pictured in March 2023, included route trial runs (left, on route passing by the STA Plaza) and rapid bus charge testing at SCC Transit Center (right)

Six months ahead of its launch, testing of City Line began in January 2023. Aspects that were evaluated included testing the line's real-time bus tracking system, real-time displays at stations, route timing, and range capabilities of City Line's battery-electric buses.

By the conclusion of the phase, Spokane Transit Authority estimated that it had put in more than 10,000 hours of testing to ensure as few issues as possible after launching the service.

Spokane Transit also engaged the public during the testing phase, seeking out test riders to participate in simulated trial runs of the route from May 10–11, 2023 to obtain feedback from users.

=== Opening ===
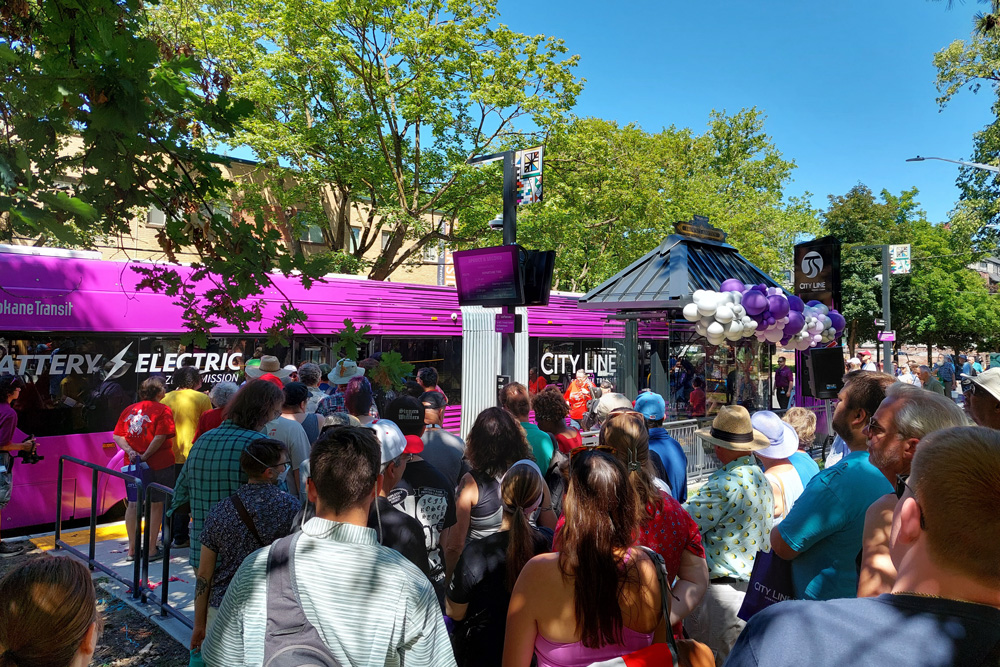
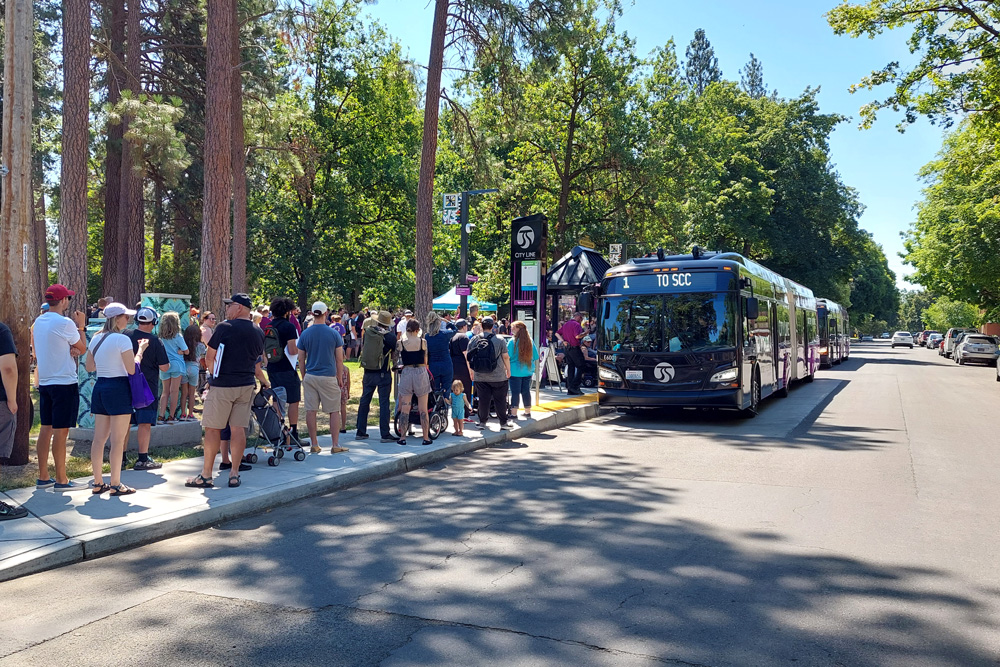
Passengers queue to ride the first City Line buses at a community service launch celebration at Coeur d'Alene Park in Spokane's Browne's Addition neighborhood.

The route began service on July 15, 2023.

STA hosted simultaneous launch day celebration events in the Browne's Addition, Downtown/Riverside, University District, Logan, and Chief Garry Park neighborhoods with food and music. Three days later, the official ribbon-cutting ceremony occurred on July 18, 2023, on the campus of Gonzaga University with leaders from Spokane city council, Spokane county commissioners, Washington State Governor Jay Inslee, and the deputy directory of the Federal Transit Administration, Veronica Vanterpool.

In April 2023, the STA board authorized an introductory fare free period for City Line. The fare-free period was set to run from the service launch date of July 15, 2023, to Labor Day on September 4, 2023, in order to encourage use of the new route and for the community to see the new electric busses and Eastern Washington's first bus rapid transit line.

Although the City Line was planned with 7.5 minute headways during peak hours, due to coach operator staffing shortages, the route opened with a reduced peak frequency of 15-minutes. Spokane Transit announced plans to implement City Line's 7.5 minute peak headways the following year, which ultimately commenced with the agency's January 21, 2024 service change.

== Route ==
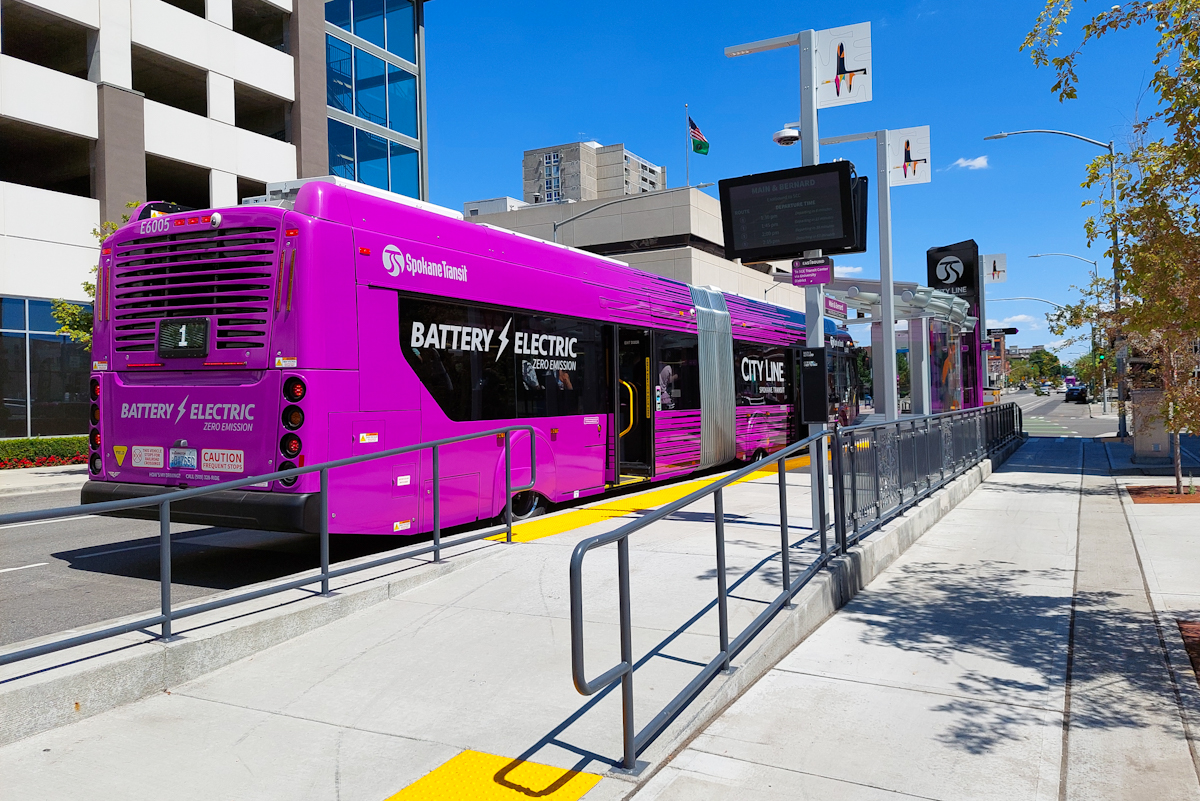
Spokane Transit City Line bus at Main & Bernard station in the Convention Center District

City Line traverses a six-mile, east–west route across Spokane between the Browne's Addition neighborhood and Spokane Community College with one-way travel times of approximately 25–30 minutes, depending on time of day and traffic conditions. The route is served by 20 stations in each direction, which are typically spaced between 1/4 to 1/3 mile apart.

The route begins west of Downtown Spokane, circling Coeur d'Alene Park in Browne's Addition. After departing, it turns east along Pacific Avenue, one of the main roads serving the Browne's Addition neighborhood, with higher density apartment buildings and commercial nodes along the road.

From Browne's Addition, City Line proceeds through Downtown Spokane. Many stations in Downtown Spokane are split into station pairs along two separate parallel roadways due to the routing of City Line along one-way roads in Downtown. In Downtown's West End, which is home to numerous breweries, condominiums, apartment buildings, and the Davenport Arts District, the route runs along First Avenue in the eastbound direction and Sprague Avenue in the westbound direction. The eastbound and westbound paths briefly converge in the core of Downtown at the STA Plaza, where passengers have the opportunity to connect to nearly every other route in the Spokane Transit network. After the STA Plaza, the route splits again with eastbound travel running along Main Avenue, and westbound travel running along Riverside Avenue. Stations along this portion of the line serve Riverfront Park, Convention Center District, and Downtown's East End.

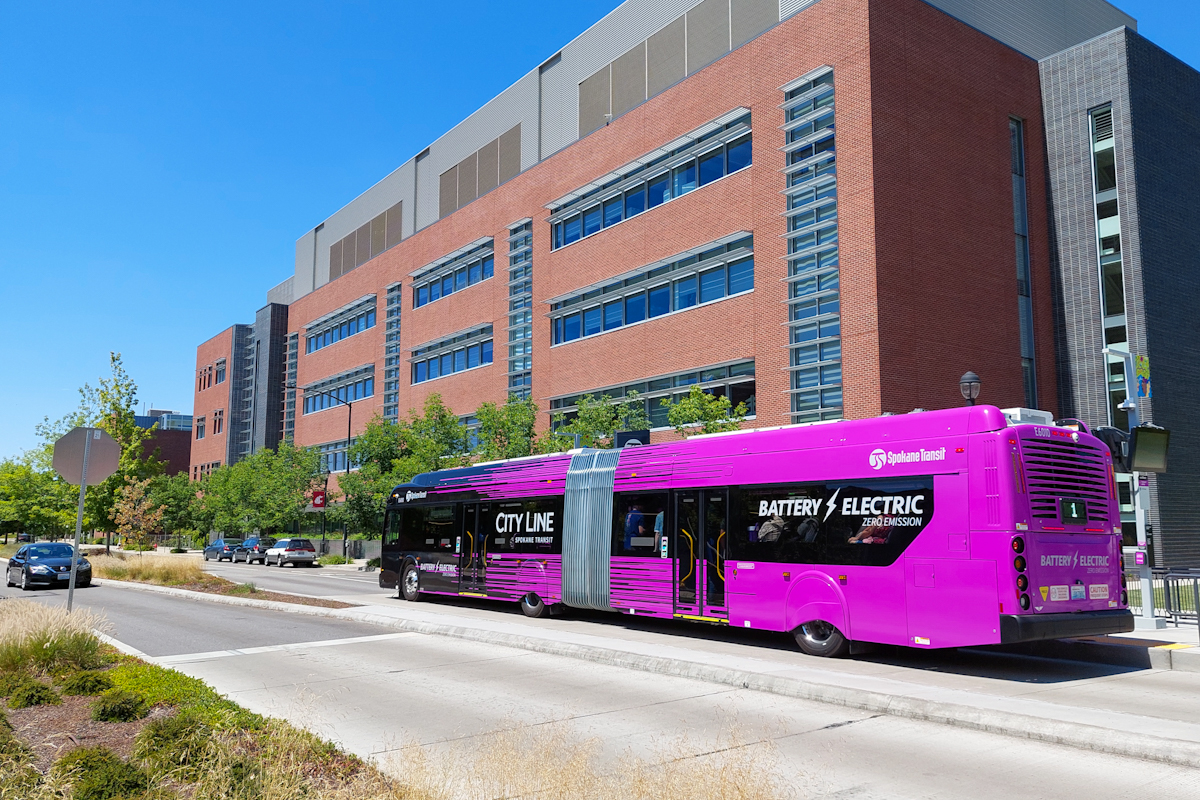
City Line bus along Spokane Falls Boulevard on the WSU Health Sciences Spokane campus in the University District

Exiting Downtown, City Line resumes its routing on two-way streets for the remainder of its route, entering the University District along a small north–south segment on Pine Street. At Spokane Falls Boulevard, the route turns east–west with a major station on the WSU Health Sciences Spokane campus. After crossing the Spokane River, the route turns north–south along Cincinnati Street, running through the Gonzaga University campus. Two stations along Cincinnati Street serve the Gonzaga Law School, Gonzaga's athletic facilities (including the McCarthey Athletic Center), University of Washington School of Medicine Spokane campus, the Centennial Trail, and the core of Gonzaga's campus.

At the north end of Gonzaga's campus, City Line continues east–west along Mission Avenue through the Logan neighborhood, serving destinations such as Mission Park, Witter Aquatic Center, Avista Utilities' headquarters, and another connection to the Centennial Trail.

From there, the route continues along Mission Avenue, crossing the Spokane River into the Chief Garry Park neighborhood. After passing through several stations, the City Line route reaches its eastern terminus at the Spokane Community College Transit Center, which provides riders transfer opportunities to other STA routes, a driver layover point, and rapid charging facilities for City Line's battery electric buses.

City Line Route Map

=== Stations ===
All stops and stations feature near-level boarding, real-time information, fare validators, off-board fare collection, and either a shelter or windscreen. Spokane Transit also collaborated with the City of Spokane to implement transit priority at some intersections.

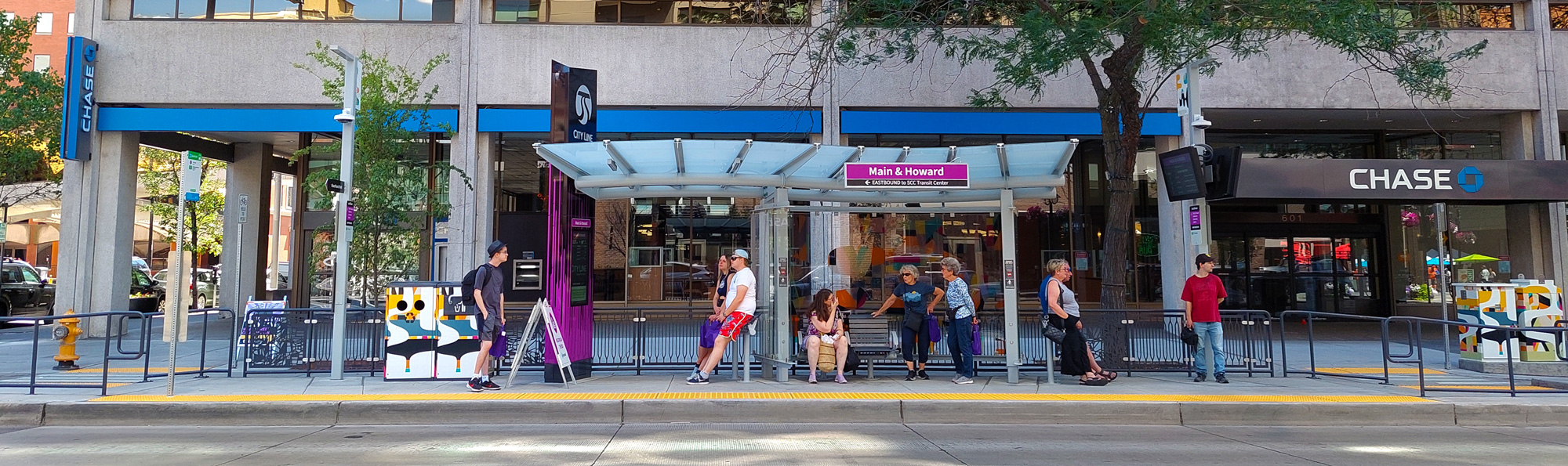
Elevation view of Main & Howard City Line Station

Station name	Neighborhood / District	Opened	Connections	Station type	Points of interest served
Cannon & Fourth	Browne's Addition	2023	STA Routes 60, 61	Bulbout	
Spruce & Second	Browne's Addition	2023		Side	Coeur d'Alene Park
Pacific & Hemlock	Browne's Addition	2023		Center	Northwest Museum of Arts and Culture
Pacific & Cannon	Browne's Addition	TBD – future infill		Center	
Pacific & Oak	Browne's Addition	2023		Center	
First & Adams (Eastbound); Sprague & Adams (Westbound)	Davenport District	2023	STA Routes 20, 661	Bulbout	
First & Monroe (Eastbound); Sprague & Monroe (Westbound)	Davenport District	2023	STA Routes 6, 20, 60, 61, 62, 66, 661	Bulbout	Fox Theater
STA Plaza	Downtown Spokane	1995	Numerous STA bus routes (see STA Plaza); Travel Washington Gold Line	Bulbout (eastbound); Transit Center (westbound)	Downtown Core
Main & Howard (Eastbound); Riverside & Stevens (Westbound)	Downtown Spokane	2023	STA Route 11 (Eastbound) STA Routes 4, 6, 14, 22, 23, 25, 26, 27, 28, 45, 74, 90, 94, 144, 172, 173, 190, 247, 724, 771 (Westbound)	Island	Riverfront Park
Main & Bernard (Eastbound); Riverside & Bernard (Westbound)	Convention Center District	2023	STA Routes 6, 14, 25, 74, 90, 172, 173, 190, 724, 771 (Westbound)	Island	First Interstate Center for the Arts; Spokane Convention Center; Spokane Intermodal Center
Main & Division (Eastbound); Riverside & Division (Westbound)	Convention Center District	2023	STA Routes 6, 25 (Eastbound) STA Routes 6, 14, 25, 90 (Westbound)	Bulbout (eastbound); Island (westbound)	
Pine & Main	University District & Logan	2023		Center	
Spokane Falls & Sherman	University District & Logan	2023	STA Route 6 People For People Route 108	Island	WSU Health Sciences Spokane campus
Cincinnati & Springfield	University District & Logan	2023		Center	McCarthey Athletic Center; Centennial Trail; UW Spokane
Cincinnati & Desmet	University District & Logan	2023		Side	Gonzaga University
Mission & Columbus	Logan	2023	STA Routes 26, 28	Center	
Mission & Perry	Logan	2023		Side	Mission Park; Centennial Trail
Mission & Napa	Chief Garry Park	2023	STA Route 14	Side	
Mission & Cook	Chief Garry Park	2023		Side	Chief Garry Park
Mission & Regal	Chief Garry Park	2023		Side	
SCC Transit Center	Chief Garry Park	2019	STA Routes 32, 33, 34, 39	Transit Center	Spokane Community College

== Service ==
City Line operates for approximately 19 hours per day Monday through Friday, from about 5:00 am to 12:00 am, and approximately 18 hours per day on Saturdays, from about 6:00 am to 12:00 am. Operating hours on Sundays are reduced to about 16 hours, from around 6:00 am to 10:00 pm.

7.5-minute frequencies are provided during weekday commuter peak hours, approximately between the morning hours of 7 am to 9 am, and afternoon hours of 3 pm to 6 pm. Mid-day frequency on weekdays is approximately 10 minutes. Off-peak, City Line provides 10 to 15-minute frequencies throughout most of the service day Monday through Saturday, with frequencies dropping to 20 and 30 minutes in the early morning and late evenings. Sunday frequencies are 15 minutes during the day and 30-minute intervals in the early morning and at night.

=== Fares ===
City Line busses support fares at each door via on-board fare collection unit that can accept QR codes via the STA Connect app, NFC via the physical STA Connect cards, and contactless payments such as Apple Pay and Google Pay. Off-board validators are also available at several City Line stations for passengers to validate their fares before boarding.

Cash payments can also be made on-board buses at right-hand board stations using the front door of the bus, similar to Spokane Transit's regular buses. However, at left-hand boarding City Line stations, on-board cash payments are not possible due to lack of front door on the driver side of the bus. Instead, passengers must use on-platform ticket vending machines to make a cash purchase and scan their printed ticket on an on-vehicle fare validator when boarding.

Fares on City Line follow the fare structure of the rest of the Spokane Transit, costing $2.00 for a standard adult two-hour pass.

== Vehicles ==
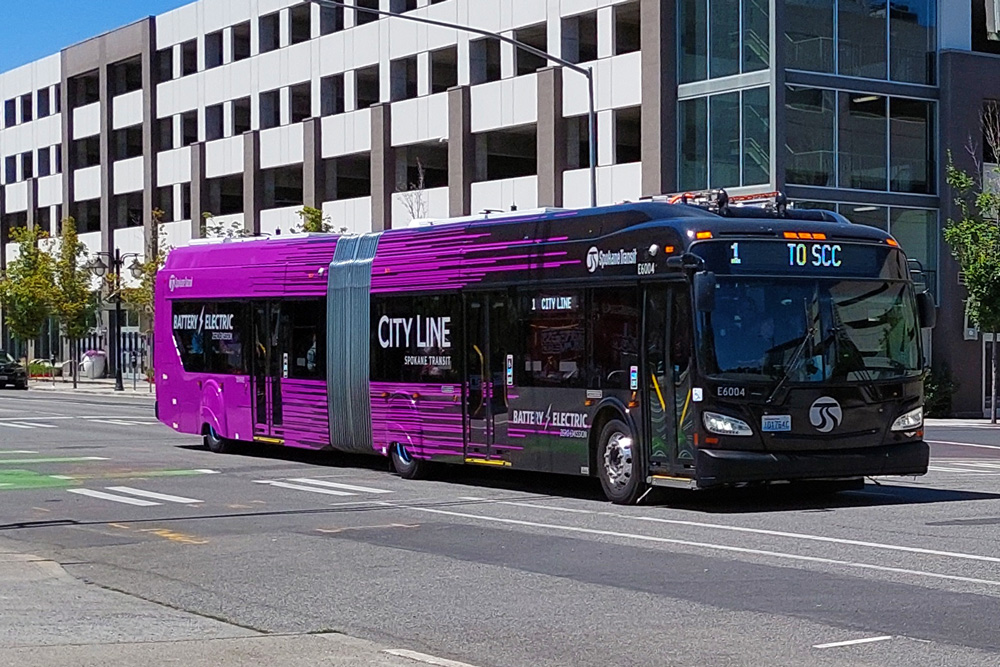
Image of a typical battery electric bus used on City Line, with branded livery

The City Line utilizes 60-foot long New Flyer Xcelsior CHARGE battery electric buses. A $13.9 million purchase for 10 buses was approved by the Spokane Transit Board of Directors on April 16, 2020. Spokane Transit planned to take delivery of the first of the buses in Q2 2021 for testing with the remaining 9 vehicles delivered toward the end of 2021, in time for the start of City Line operations in 2022. However, it took delivery of the first bus ahead of schedule in December 2020, publicly revealing it for the first time in March 2021.

The buses feature a special black and purple livery and have five doors—three on the right and two on the left to support the interoperability between side-boarding platforms and center-boarding platforms along the route.

=== Electric capability and rapid charging ===
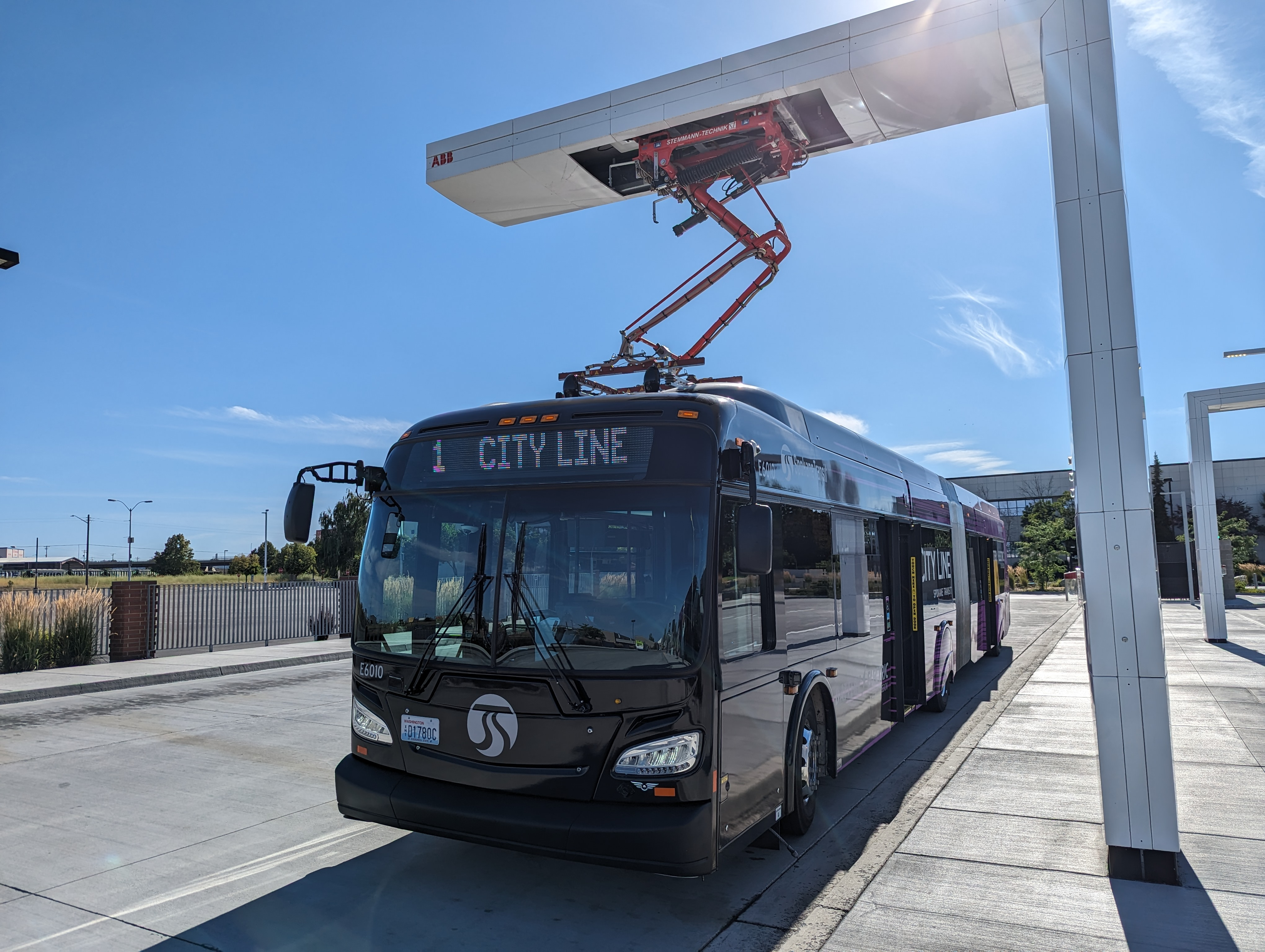
The buses used on the City Line have doors on both sides and charge their batteries via overhead rapid chargers.

The initial fleet of buses utilized on City Line are equipped with batteries that have a 320 kilowatt-hour (kWh) capacity, enabling a driving range of 120 to 150 miles. From an operational perspective, Spokane Transit projects the range of a fully-charged City Line bus to be enough to operate non-stop throughout the entirety of the line's 7.5-minute peak service frequency on weekdays, with each peak lasting a duration of two to three hours. After the initial peak, buses connect to rapid chargers during 15-minute layover periods at the line's eastern terminus, Spokane Community College Transit Center, before beginning another route run. The rapid charging strategy implemented on City Line allows its fleet to remain on-route throughout the day and as well as end each service day mostly charged, minimizing the time needed to finish its charging cycle overnight at STA's bus depot.

Rapid charging on-route is accomplished through overhead charging stations. The equipment, by ABB Ltd., is equipped with a SAE J3105 pantograph that drops from above, making contact with the roof mounted-charger on the bus below.
