= Browne's Addition, Spokane =

Browne's Addition
- Spokane Neighborhood
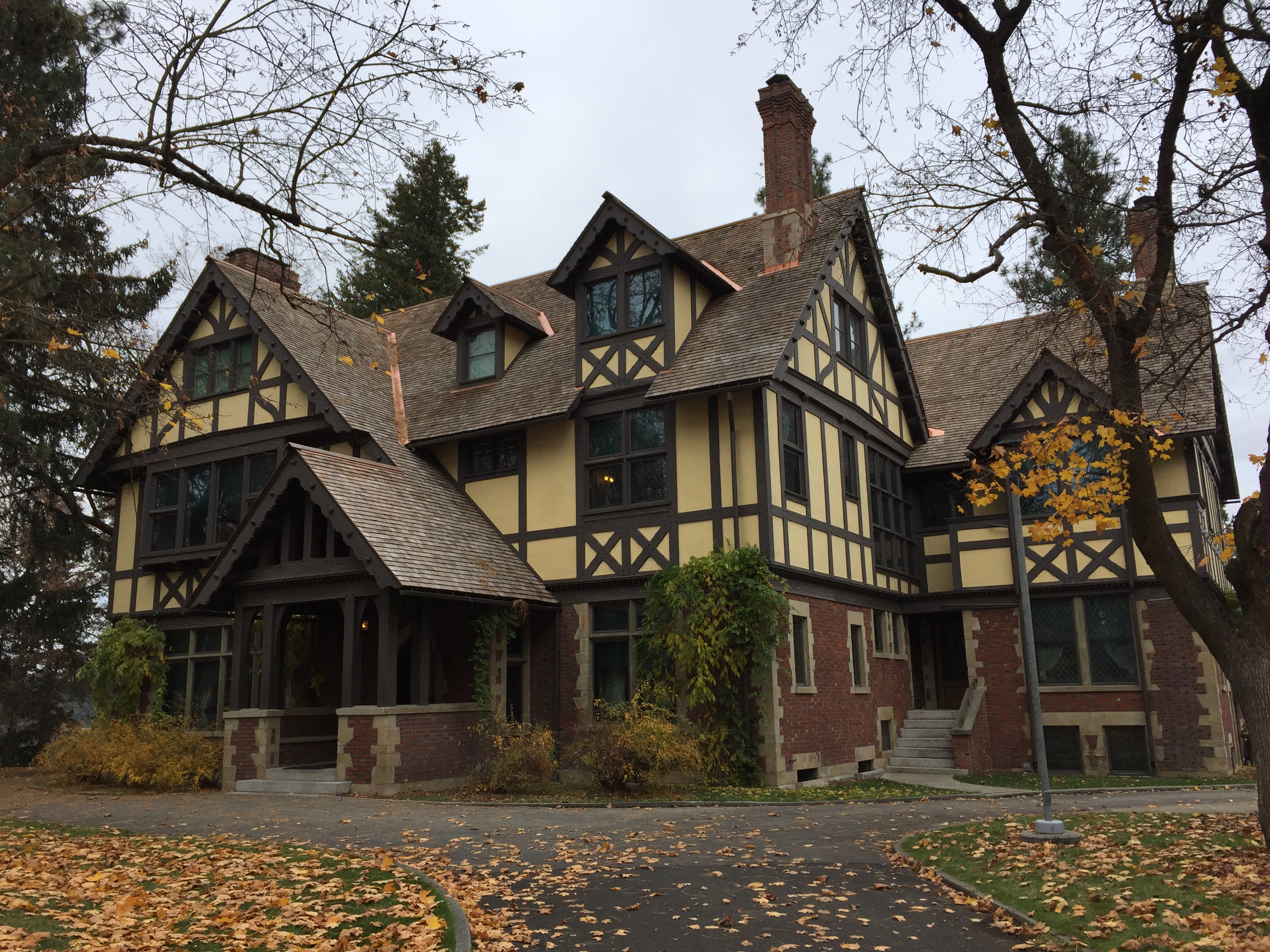
- The historic Campbell House

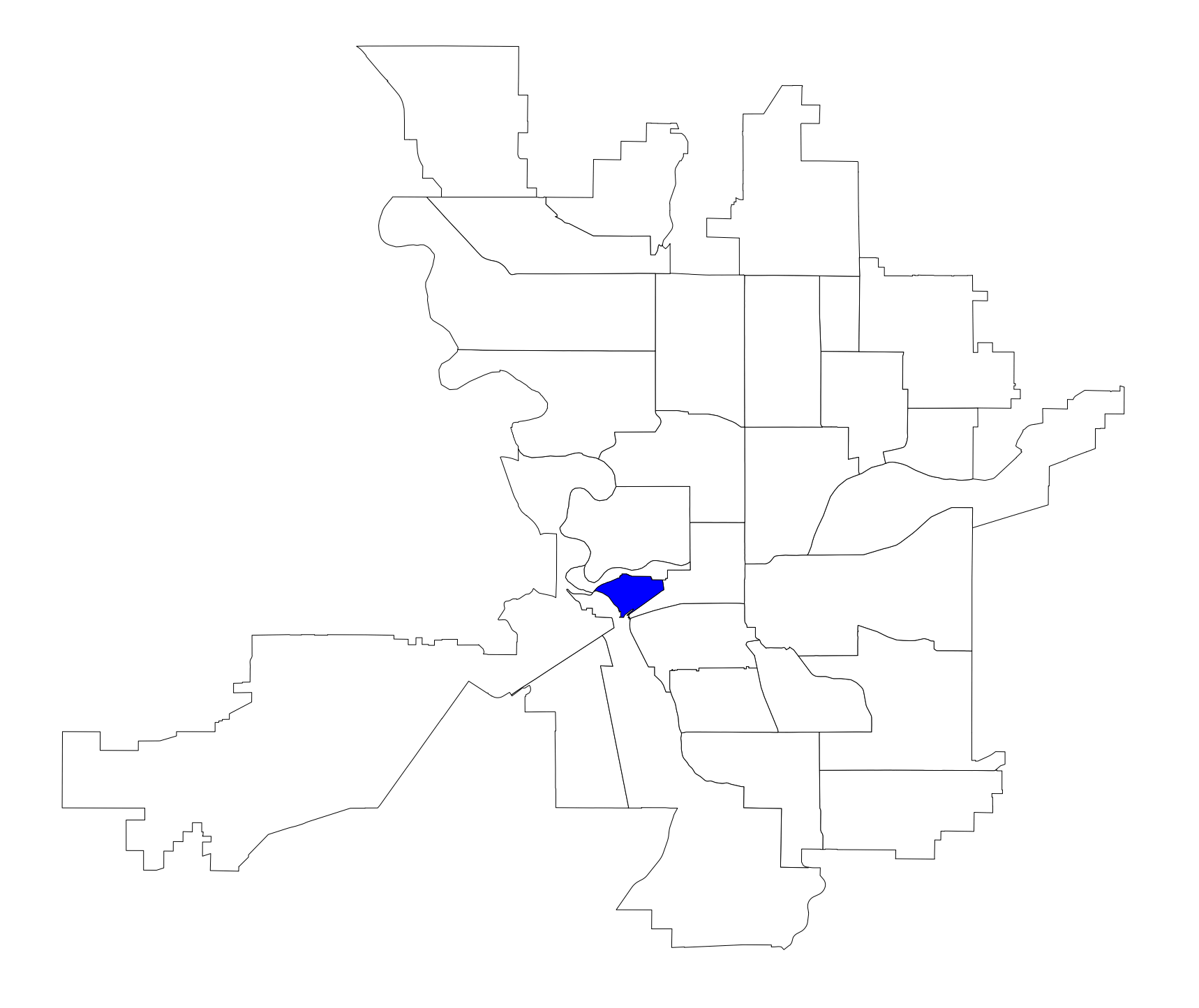
- Location within the city of Spokane
- Coordinates: 47°39′20.0″N 117°26′29.8″W
- Country: United States
- State: Washington
- County: Spokane
- City: Spokane

Population (2017)
  - Total: 2,959

Demographics 2017
  - White: 74.8%
  - Latinx: 7.1%
  - Black: 5.9%
  - Asian/Native Hawaiian/Pacific Islander: 6.2%
- Time zone: UTC-8 (PST)
  - Summer (DST): UTC-7 (PDT)
- ZIP Codes: 99201
- Area code: 509

Browne's Addition, often referred to shorthand as just Browne's, is a neighborhood in Spokane, Washington. It is located directly west of Downtown Spokane and is one of the oldest and densest neighborhoods in the city. The area is known for its numerous historic mansions, many of which have been converted into multi-family apartments. The terrain is flat in the neighborhood despite the degree of topographical relief in the immediate surrounding area. Latah Creek cuts a deep valley to the west, separating Browne's Addition from the Sunset Hill portion of the West Hills neighborhood and the Spokane River gorge drops off dramatically to the north into the Peaceful Valley neighborhood. The South Hill area of Spokane rises to the southwest.

Browne's Addition is known as one of Spokane's centers of culture, with its collection of historic structures, vibrant culinary and nightlife scene, numerous community festivals, and for being the location of the Northwest Museum of Arts and Culture.

== Geography ==
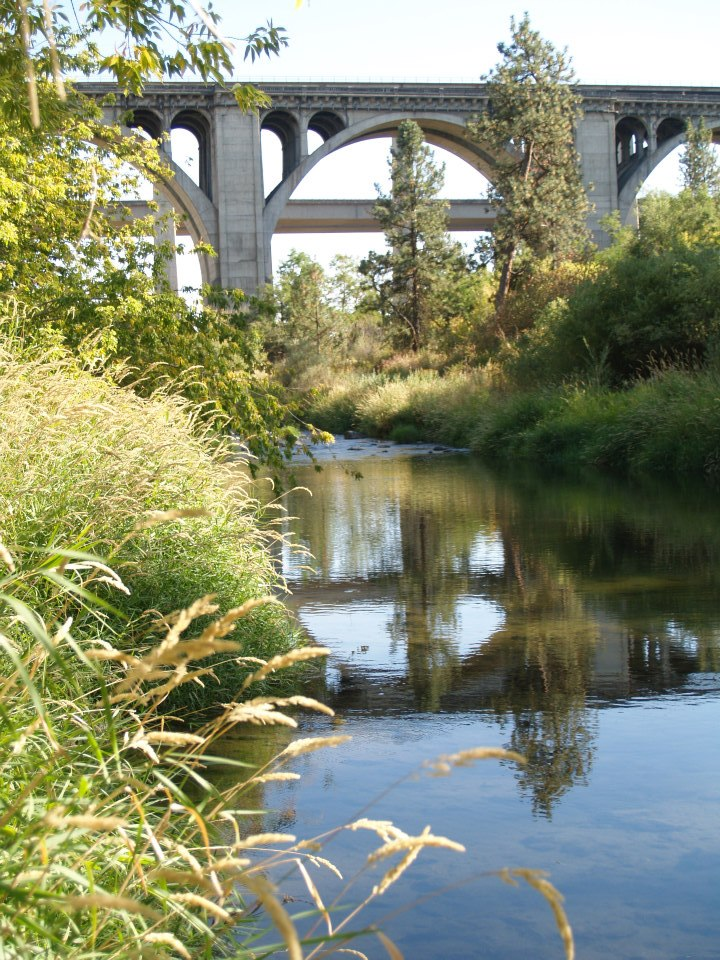
Bridges crossing Latah Creek from Browne's Addition (left) to the West Hills.

Browne's Addition is immediately to the west of Downtown Spokane. There is something of an interface area between Downtown and Browne's in the Carnegie Square area, which straddles the border between the two neighborhoods on Riverside and 1st Avenues. Spokane Fire Department Station 4 is located on the Browne's Addition side of this interface, surrounded by the off-and-on-ramps of the Maple Street Bridge.

The Spokane River cuts a deep gorge to the north of Browne's Addition, with the Peaceful Valley neighborhood occupying the area between the slope and the river itself. Latah Creek, which flows into the Spokane River a few hundred feet northwest of Browne's Addition, cuts a similarly deep valley to the west of the neighborhood, forming the border between Browne's Addition and the High Bridge Park portion of the Latah/Hangman neighborhood. Sunset Boulevard, which crosses Latah Creek to connect the Sunset Hill area of the West Hills neighborhood with Browne's Addition, Downtown Spokane and the rest of the city, acts as the southern border of the neighborhood. Though, the elevated railroad tracks running adjacent to and immediately south of Sunset Boulevard are the official boundary between Browne's Addition and the Cliff/Cannon Neighborhood of the South Hill.

Riverside Avenue passes from Downtown Spokane through the northern edge of the neighborhood, providing an arterial and thoroughfare through the neighborhood down into Peaceful Valley and on into the West Hills. Pacific Avenue and Second Avenue provide the main east-to-west thoroughfares through the neighborhood, with both coming to an end on the western edge of Browne's Addition. Sunset Boulevard on the south, like Riverside on the north, is a thoroughfare that goes through and beyond the neighborhood. There are no true north-south arterials in the neighborhood, due to the gorge cut by the river to the north and the elevated railroad tracks to the south. Cannon Street acts as the closest thing to a north-south arterial in the neighborhood, as its roundabout intersection with Pacific Avenue can be considered to be the heart of the neighborhood.

The City Line bus rapid transit route is, as of 2021, under construction in Browne's Addition. It will connect the neighborhood, on its western end, to Spokane Community College in Chief Garry Park via Downtown Spokane and Gonzaga University. It is expected to open in 2023, though infrastructure for the line has been constructed in the neighborhood as of 2021.

Coeur d'Alene Park, named for nearby Coeur d'Alene, Idaho is located in the middle of the neighborhood. It takes up four square blocks centered on Third Avenue and Hemlock Street and provides basketball courts, tennis courts, a playground, restrooms, picnic facilities and a gazebo in the center. Tall, old ponderosa pine trees are common throughout the park and neighborhood.

== History ==
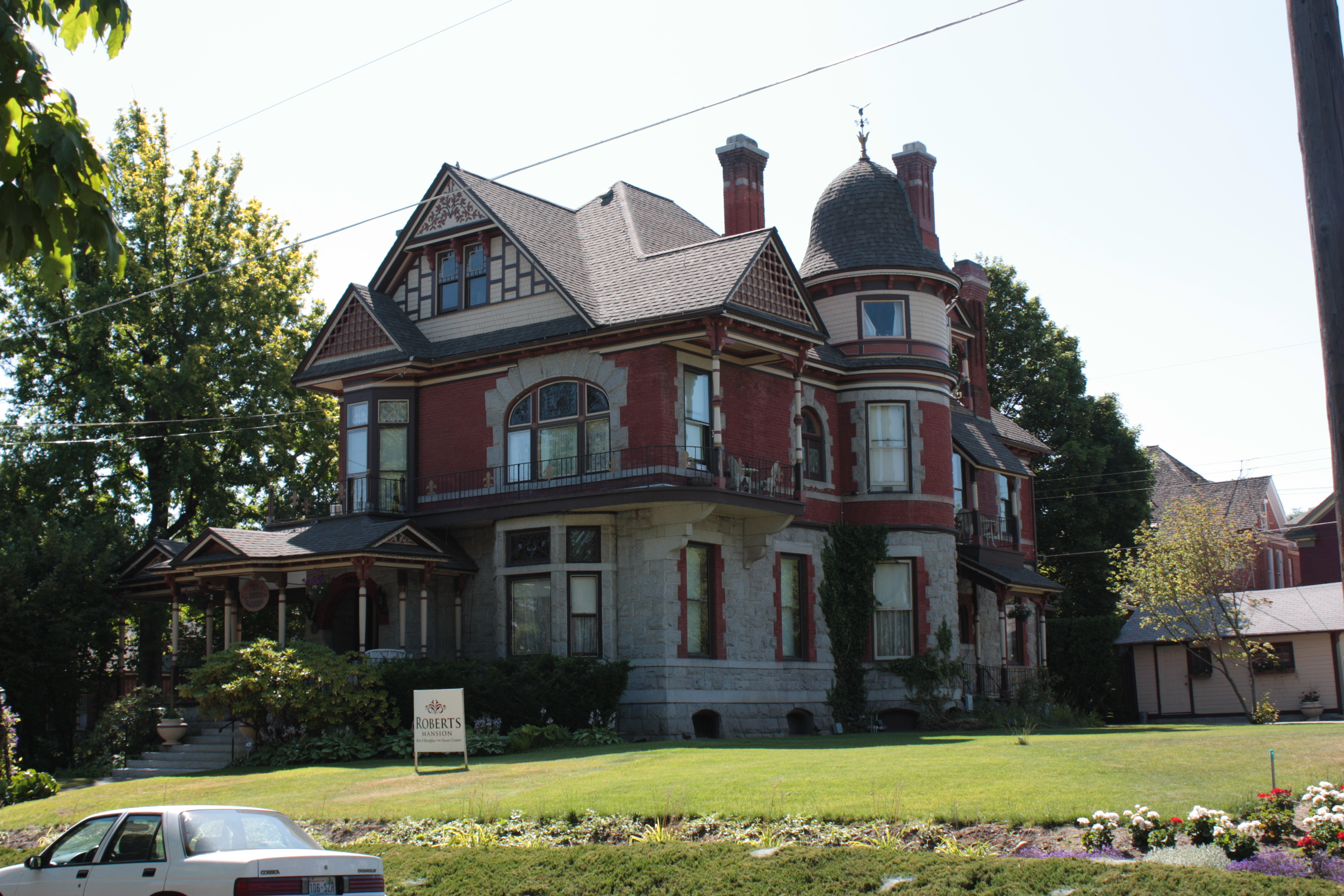
The Loewenberg-Roberts House, a historic mansion that now operates as a bed and breakfast and events center

The Spokane people inhabited the area that is now known as Browne's Addition for thousands of years prior to the arrival of European settlers. The area was part of the tribe's wintering ground. Development and growth in the neighborhood, particularly on tribal burial grounds, continues to be a point of contention as of 2020.

Browne's Addition was Spokane's first neighborhood. It is home to numerous historical structures that date back to the early days of Spokane. Its namesake, J.J. Browne, arrived in Spokane in 1878. Browne, along with A.M. Cannon, namesake of the Cliff/Cannon neighborhood to the south, bought a quarter of the Spokane townsite from its founder, James Glover. They later added 160 acres to the west of the townsite that would eventually become the Browne's and Cannon's Additions.

Chinese immigrants played a critical, if forgotten, role in the early city of Spokane and the Browne's Addition neighborhood. Racial enmity between white and Chinese settlers was problematic. There was a Chinese cemetery on the western edge of Pacific Avenue in the 1880s, though the graves were later exhumed and the remains moved to China.

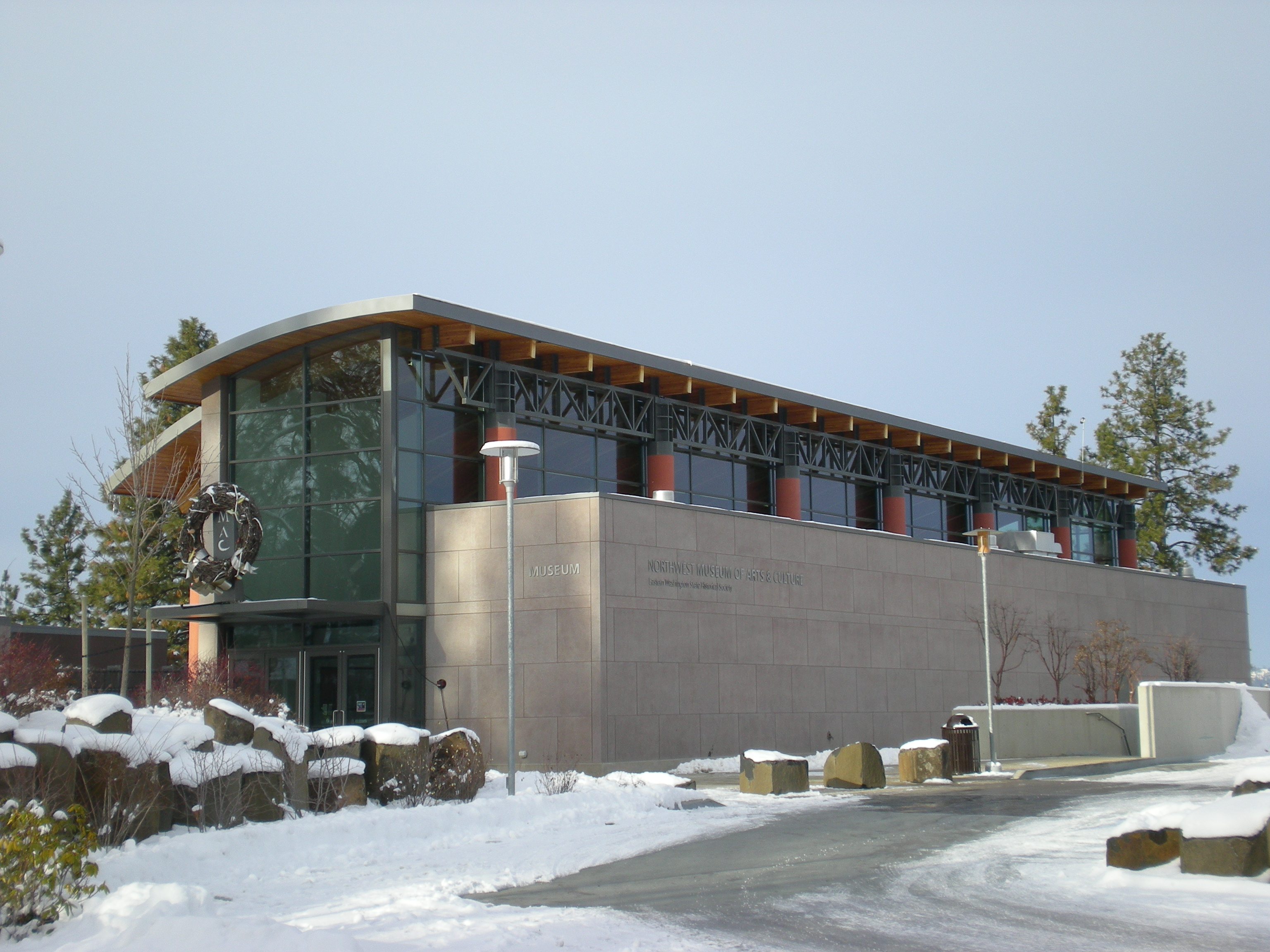
The Northwest Museum of Arts and Culture

Browne's Addition was home to many of the mining magnates from the surrounding region, who sought out the ability to live luxuriously away from, but within reach of, the rowdy mining areas from which they profited. As a result, many large mansions were built in the neighborhood, including the historic Campbell House. Many of these mansions remain today, with some still serving as single-family housing but the majority have moved onto other uses. Some, like the Campbell House on the campus of the Northwest Museum of Arts and Culture are preserved for their historic value, while others like the Patsy Clark Mansion, have become commercial spaces. Most, however, serve as multi-family apartment-style dwellings, a trend which began in the 1920s.

As urban decay took hold in the middle of the 20th century, Browne's Addition's fortunes turned. No longer was it the home for the wealthiest in the community; its mansions became divided up into apartments and some smaller dwellings were torn down to make room for multi-family housing. Crime and drug addiction became rampant to the point that the neighborhood was often referred to as "Browne's Addiction."

Since the 1990s that stigma has faded as the neighborhood has seen reinvestment. It is now the most culturally diverse neighborhood in Spokane and home to residents of all income levels, with some condominiums selling for $600,000 and some apartments renting for $300 per month as of 2009. That same year, the American Planning Association listed Browne's Addition as one of its ten best neighborhoods in the country. The revitalization of the neighborhood has not come without controversy, however, as many residents see the new developments as detrimental to the historic nature of the neighborhood.

=== Historic places ===
Browne's Addition is home to six individual properties listed on the National Register of Historic Places, many of which are also listed as contributing to the NRHP's Browne's Addition Historic District which comprises most of the area of the neighborhood.

	Name on the Register	Image	Date listed	Location	Description
1	Amman	Amman	February 12, 1987 (#87000086)	W. 1516 Riverside; 47°39′25″N 117°26′01″W	Built in 1904.
2	Campbell House	Campbell House	May 31, 1974 (#74001979)	W. 2316 1st Ave. 47°39′25″N 117°26′45″W	Built in 1898, this house is now part of the Northwest Museum of Arts and Culture.
3	Patsy Clark Mansion	Patsy Clark Mansion	October 31, 1975 (#75001873)	W. 2208 2nd Ave. 47°39′19″N 117°26′39″W	
4	Coeur d'Alene Park	Coeur d'Alene Park	December 12, 2018 (#100003228)	2111 W 2nd Ave. 47°39′13″N 117°26′41″W	
5	Finch House	Finch House	July 12, 1976 (#76001917)	W. 2340 1st Ave., S. 104 Poplar; 47°39′27″N 117°26′48″W	Built circa 1897, this home was designed by Kirtland Cutter & Karl G. Malmgren of Cutter & Malmgren.
6	Sunset Boulevard Bridge	Sunset Boulevard Bridge	July 16, 1982 (#82004293)	Spans Latah Creek; 47°39′00″N 117°26′48″W	Built 1911-14. Historic Bridges and Tunnels in Washington TR. Extends into West Hills.

== Demographics ==
As of 2017, 2,959 people live in Browne's Addition across 1,977 households. 86.4% of households are rented, well above the citywide average of 45.3%. People aged 19 and under account for 9.9% of the population, while those 65 and above account for 11.8% of the population, both of which are below their citywide averages. Browne's Addition is known for its young, but adult, population. The median household income is $28,760 and the unemployment rate is 8.2%. In terms of education, 13.5% of the population has nothing more than a high school diploma, well below the citywide average, and 41.8% have a bachelor's degree or above, well above the citywide average. 94.4% of the population was born in the United States. Of the foreign born residents, 27.8% are from Japan, 23.8 from Ethiopia, 11.5% from Vietnam and 7.9% from Norway.

It is known as a hip neighborhood for young adults, with many students and service-industry workers calling it home.

== Education ==
Browne's Addition is served by Spokane Public Schools. There are no schools in the neighborhood. It is part of the Roosevelt Elementary district, located in the adjacent Cliff/Cannon neighborhood. Roosevelt feeds into Sacajawea Middle School in the Comstock neighborhood and then into Lewis and Clark High School.

== Transportation ==
=== Surface streets ===
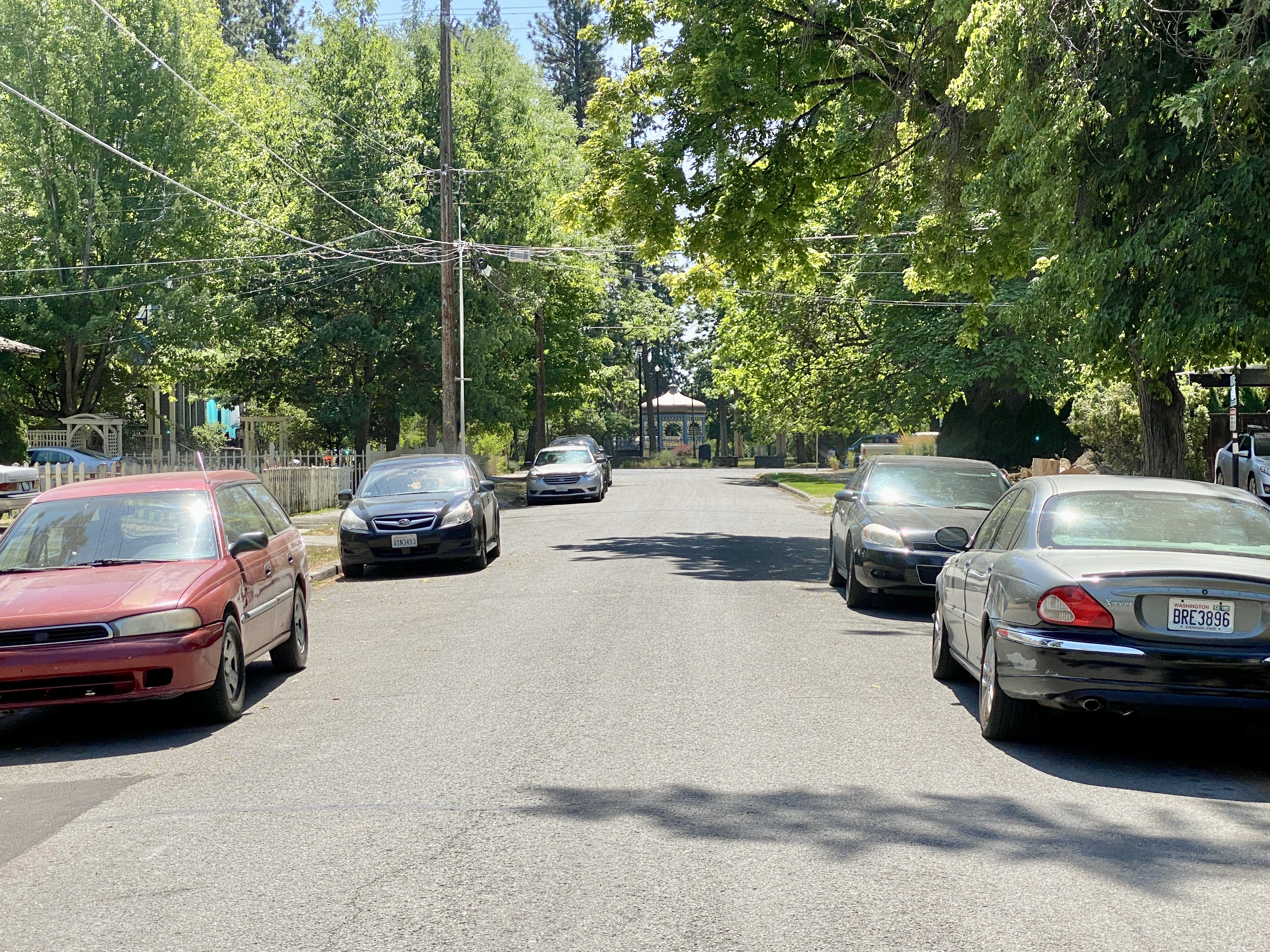
Hemlock Street looking south towards Coeur d'Alene Park

Located directly west of downtown Spokane, Browne's Addition is well integrated in the city's street grid plan. The neighborhood has three principal arterial streets, Maple Street, Walnut Street, and Sunset Boulevard. Only Sunset Boulevard traverses the neighborhood, doing so diagonally across its southern boundary, while Maple Street and Walnut Street only briefly transit the neighborhood on its northeast corner, where there is a junction that forms the Maple Street/Walnut Street couplet. Riverside Avenue is classified by the city as a major collector street in the neighborhood, running east to west across the neighborhoods northern boundary. The rest of the streets are considered to be local access roads.

=== Public transit ===
The Spokane Transit Authority, the region's public transportation provider, serves Browne's Addition with three fixed schedule bus lines.

Route	Termini			Service operation and notes	Streets traveled
1; City Line	Browne's Addition	↔	Chief Garry Park; Spokane Community College	Bus rapid transit route	Cannon St, 4th Ave, 1st Ave, 2nd Ave
20; SFCC	Downtown Spokane; STA Plaza	↔	West Hills; Spokane Falls Community College	High-frequency route	Riverside
60; Airport via Browne's Addition	Downtown Spokane; STA Plaza	↔	West Hills; Spokane International Airport	Basic-frequency route	Riverside, Maple, Pacific, Spruce, Fourth, Cannon, Sunset
61; Hwy 2 via Browne's Addition	Downtown Spokane; STA Plaza	↔	Airway Heights, Washington; Fairchild Air Force Base	Basic-frequency route	Riverside, Maple, Pacific, Spruce, Fourth, Cannon, Sunset
