= St. Andrew's Episcopal Church (Chelan, Washington) =

Historic church in Washington, United States

- St. Andrews Episcopal Church
- U.S. National Register of Historic Places
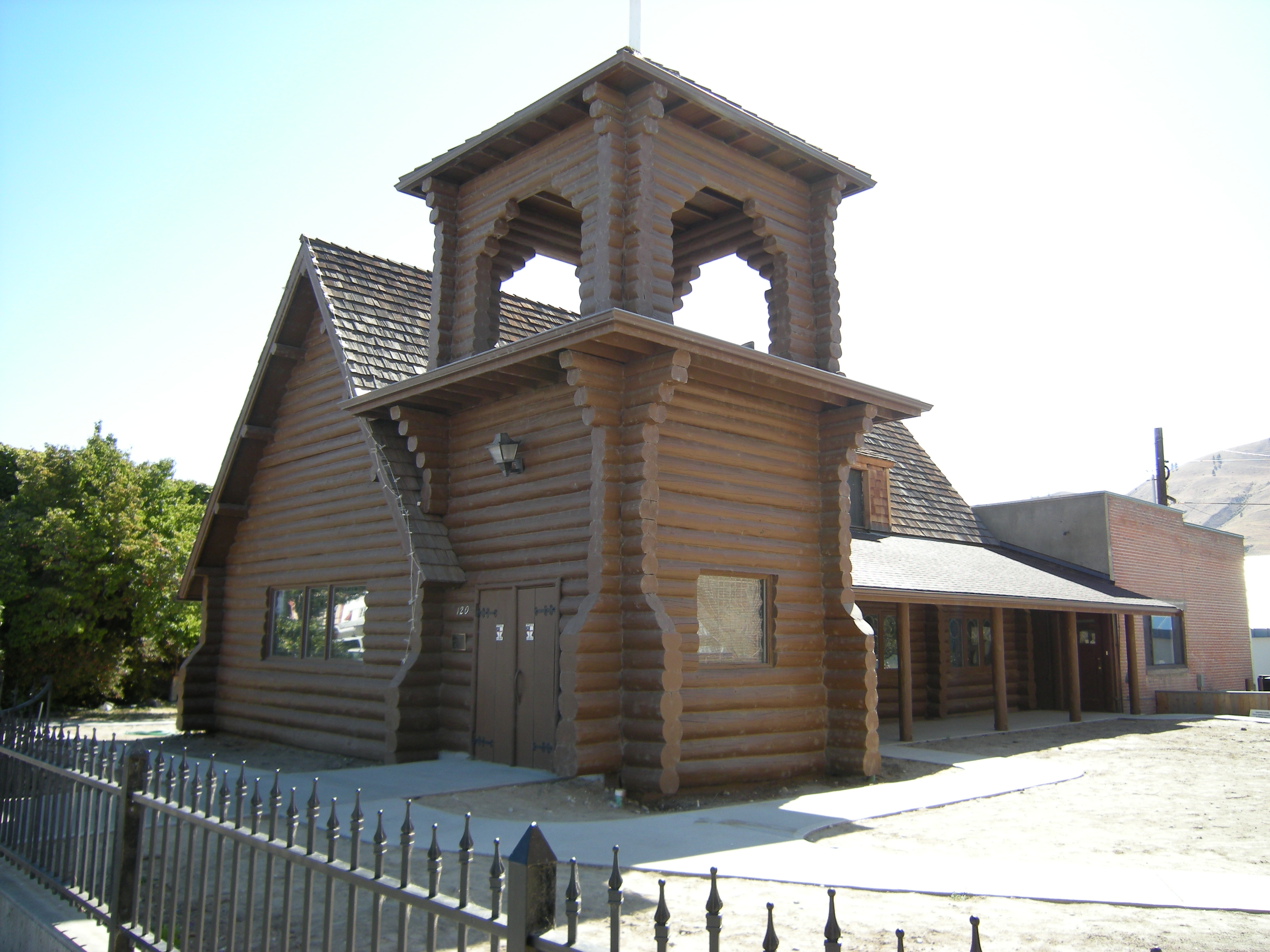

- Location within Washington (state)
- Location: 120 East Woodin Avenue, Chelan, Washington
- Coordinates: 47°50′23″N 120°01′06″W
- Area: less than one acre
- Built: 1897
- Architect: Kirtland Kelsey Cutter; Karl Gunnar Malmgren
- Architectural style: Bungalow/craftsman
- NRHP reference No.: 92000283
- Added to NRHP: March 31, 1992

St. Andrews Episcopal Church is a historic church at 120 E. Woodin Avenue in Chelan, Washington, United States. It was built in 1897 and added to the National Register of Historic Places in 1992. The architect was Karl Gunnar Malmgren from the firm Cutter & Malmgren of Spokane Washington.

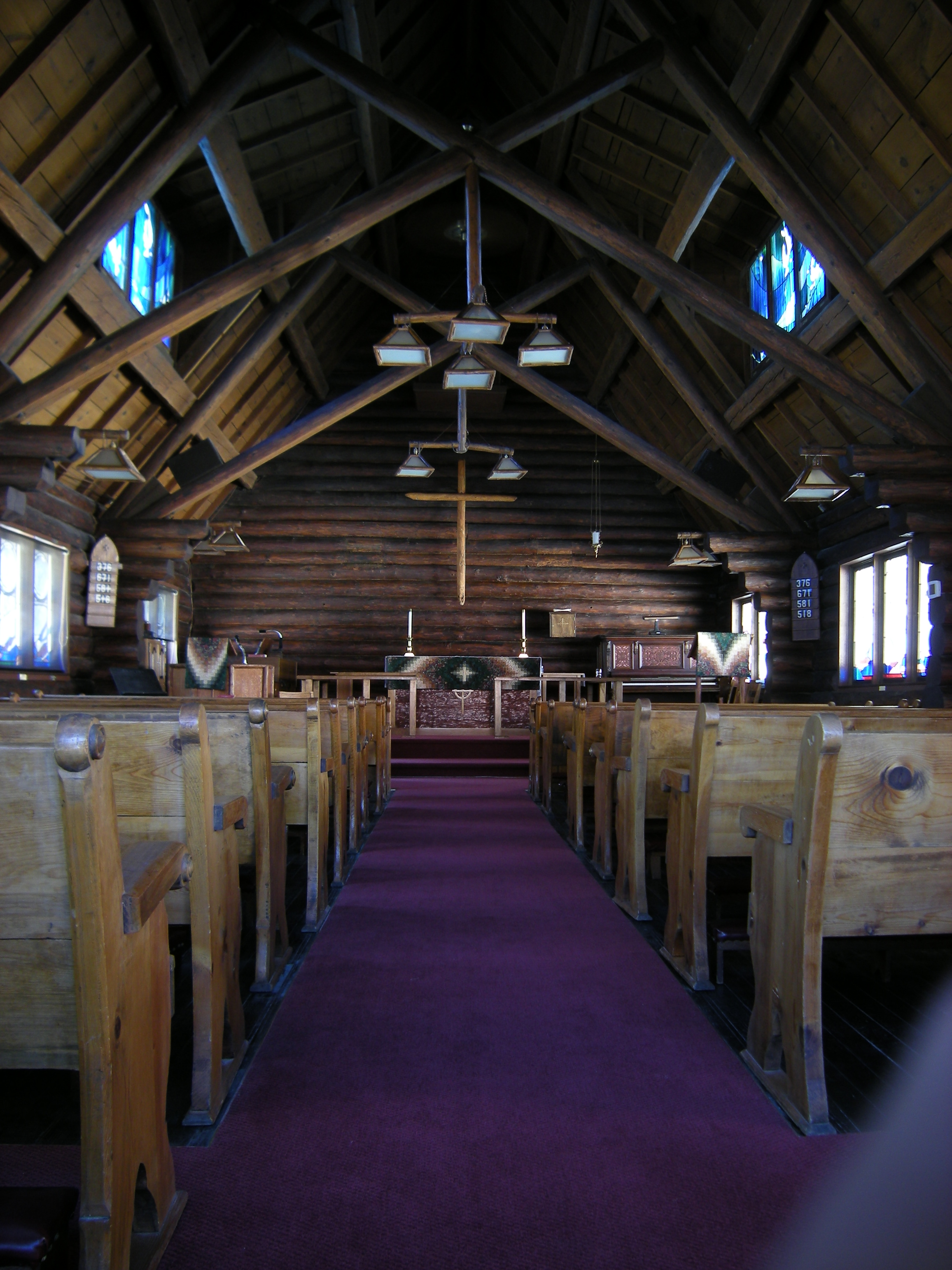
Church interior in 2008
