= Carnegie Camp North Point =

View from lake of North Point Camp.

The Carnegie Camp North Point is on the northern shore of Raquette Lake in the Adirondack Park in New York. It is one of the original Great Camps of the Adirondacks located on Raquette Lake the home to many summer camps of the wealthy built during the Gilded Age.

North Point was designed by Spokane, Washington architect, Kirtland Cutter, for Lucy C. Carnegie, Andrew Carnegie's sister-in-law and matriarch of the Carnegie family. It is speculated that Cutter was selected to design the building after Lucy saw the Idaho Building designed by Cutter at the 1893 Chicago World's Fair. The Assembly Hall building (left) and Dining Hall (right) with guest rooms above were the primary residences of the camp. Other original buildings included guides' cabins, a boat house, ice house and water tower. The buildings were completed in 1903 and used by the Carnegie family until Lucy's death in 1916. The camp was sold by the Carnegie family in 1923.

The North Point Camp was later to become a commercial vacation destination in the 1920s as The North Point Inn and later The North Point Club that encompassed a large complex of nearby cottages and other special purpose buildings. The Assembly Hall and Dining Hall buildings have been maintained as a private residence since the late 1950s.
