= Patsy Clark Mansion =

Historic house in Washington, United States

- U.S. National Register of Historic Places
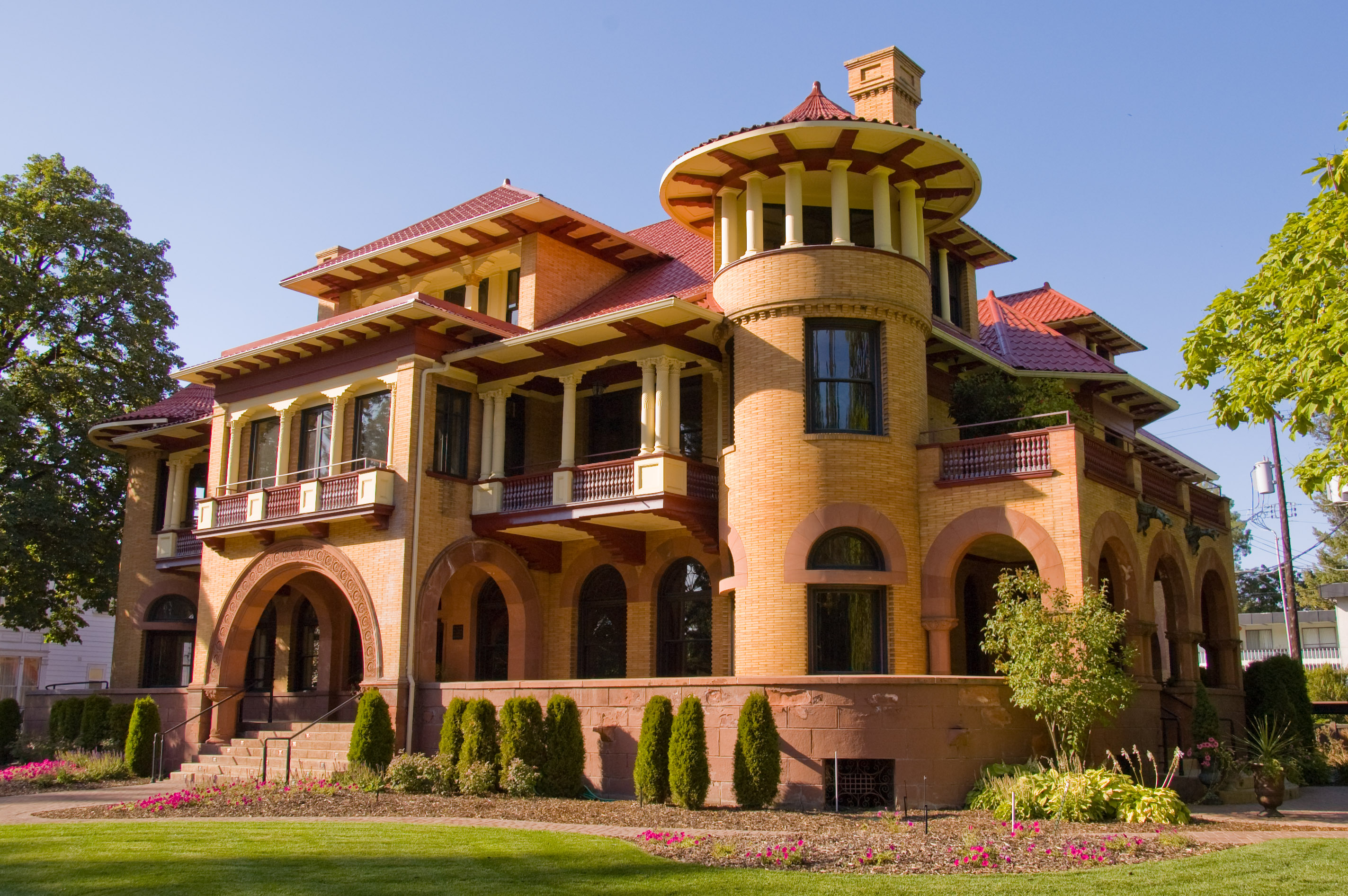

- Location within Washington (state)
- Interactive map showing the location of Patsy Clark Mansion
- Location: W. 2208 2nd Ave., Spokane, Washington
- Coordinates: 47°39′19″N 117°26′39″W
- Area: less than one acre
- Built: 1898
- Architect: Kirtland Kelsey Cutter
- NRHP reference No.: 75001873
- Added to NRHP: October 31, 1975

The Patsy Clark Mansion is a Spokane, Washington, United States, residence that was designed by architect Kirtland Cutter in 1897 for mining millionaire Patsy Clark. It is located at 2208 West Second Avenue in the city's historic Browne's Addition. The mansion had long been used as a restaurant. In 2002, a law firm purchased the mansion for $1.03 million in order to rescue the landmark from further deterioration. The mansion now houses a law firm, while still remaining open for private rentals for small events.

It was listed on the National Register of Historic Places as Clark Mansion in 1975. It is included also as a contributing property in Browne's Addition Historic District.
