= Northwest Museum of Arts and Culture =

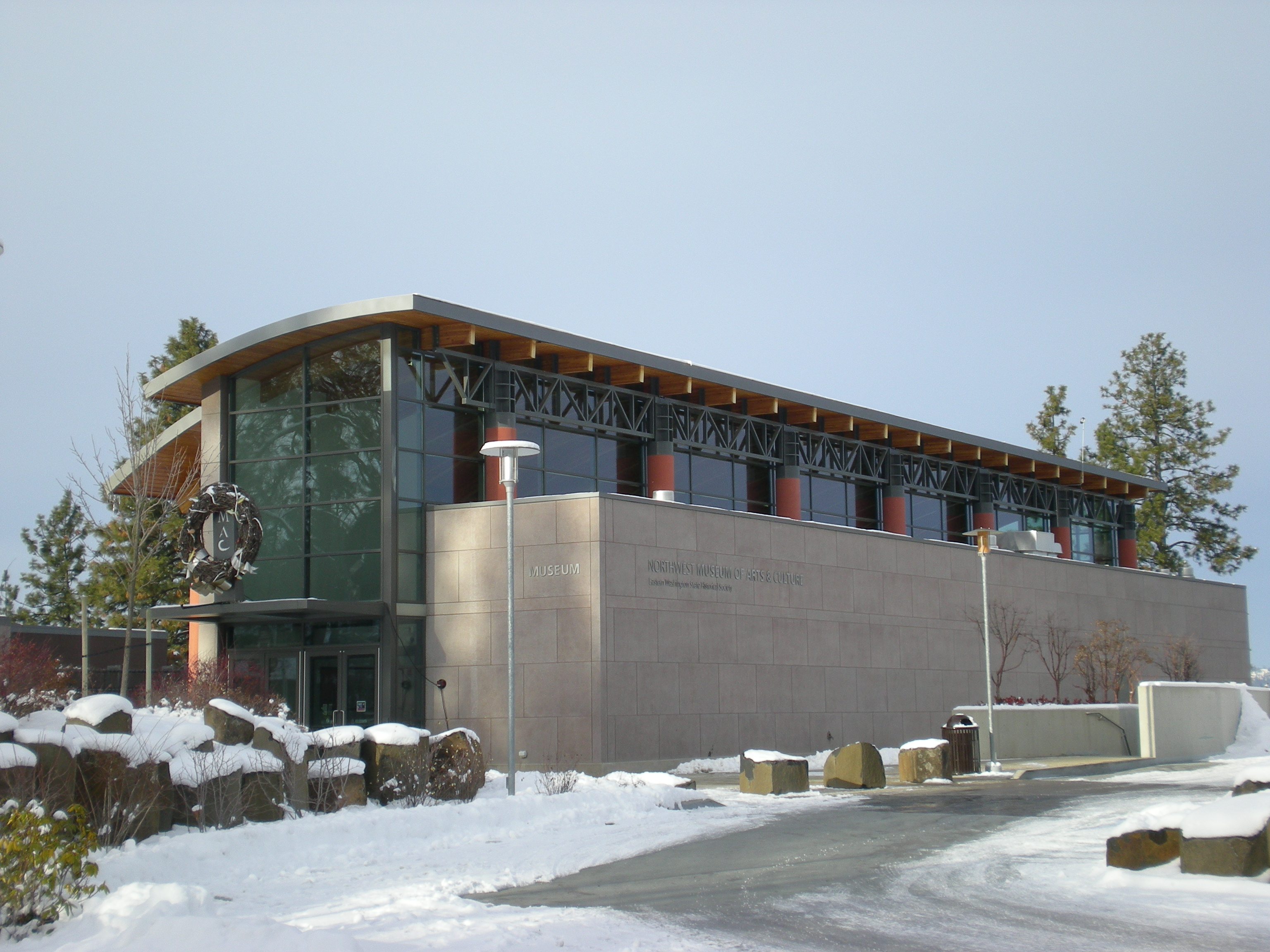
- Main entrance of the Northwest Museum of Arts and Culture
- Former name: Cheney Cowles Museum
- Established: June 5, 1916; 110 years ago (as the Spokane Historical Society)
- Location: Spokane, Washington
- Coordinates: 47°39′25″N 117°26′44″W
- Website: northwestmuseum.org

The Northwest Museum of Arts and Culture, formerly the Cheney Cowles Museum, is located in Spokane, Washington's Browne's Addition neighborhood. It is associated with the Smithsonian Institution, and is accredited by the American Alliance of Museums.

== About ==
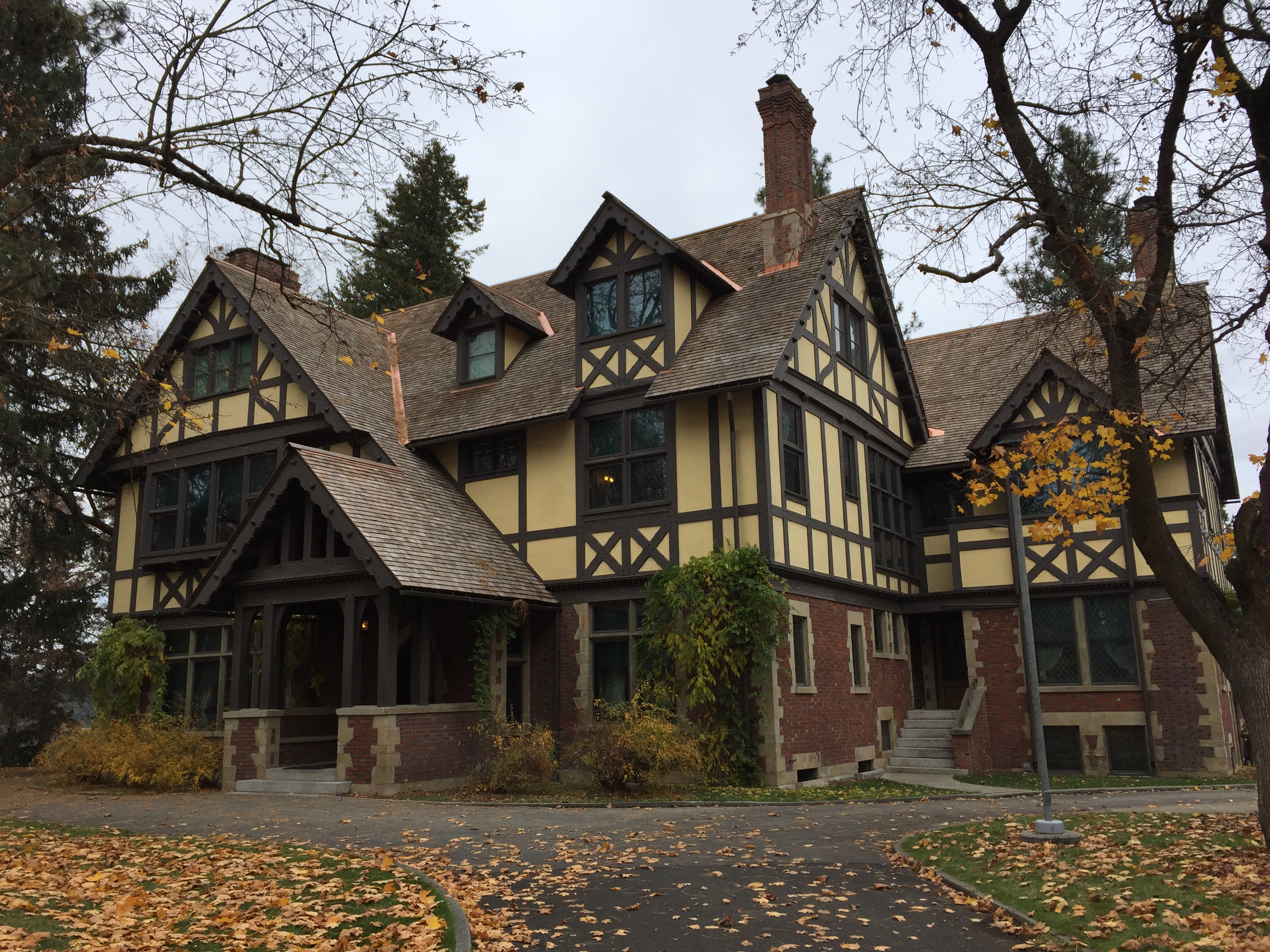
The Campbell House

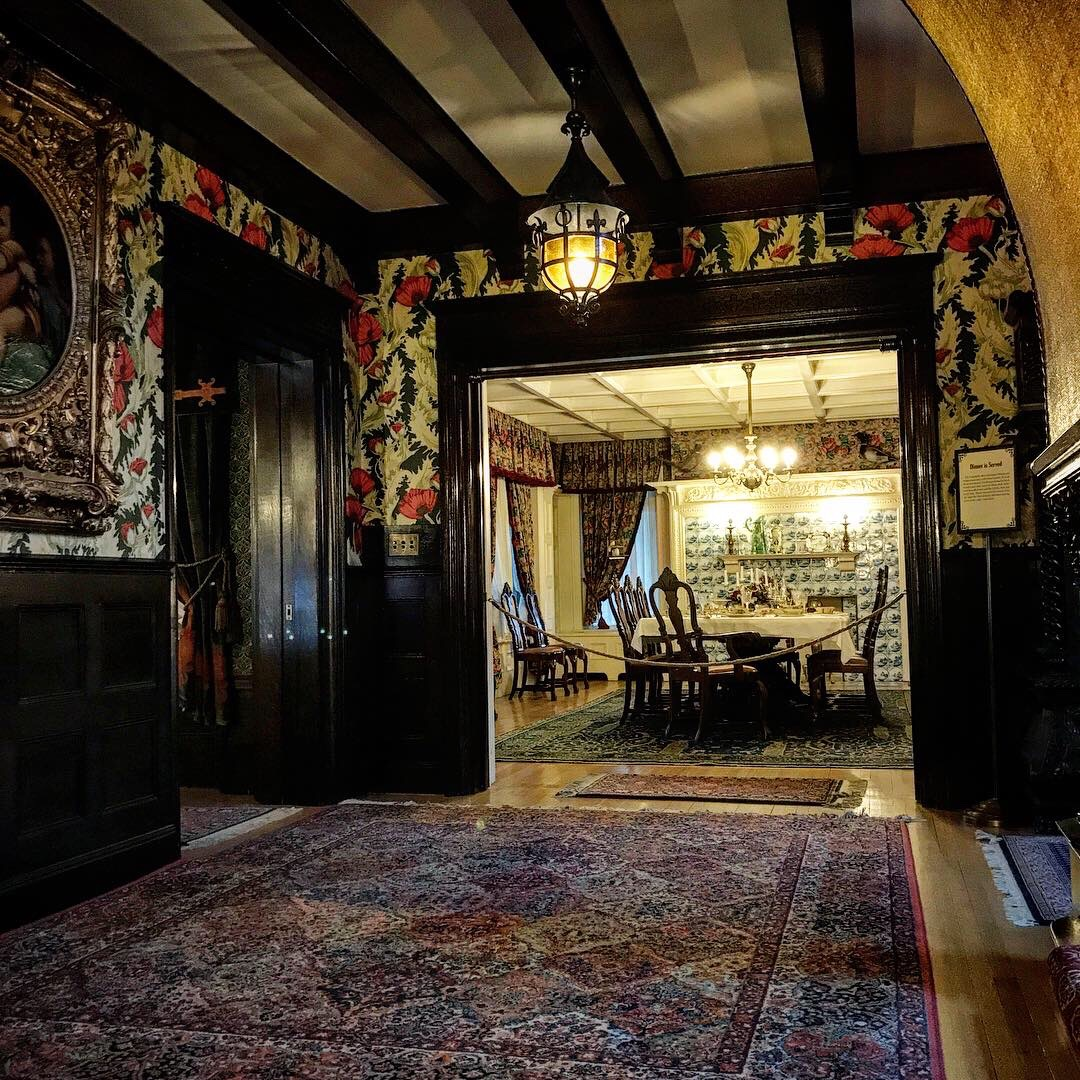
Cambell House entryway and dining room

The MAC, as it is colloquially known, also owns and offers tours at the nearby Campbell House, an 1898 house designed by architect Kirtland Cutter, and included on the National Register of Historic Places listings in Spokane County, Washington.

The Northwest Museum of Arts and Culture (MAC) is the largest cultural organization in the Inland Northwest with five underground galleries, café, store, education center, community room and the Center for Plateau Cultural Studies. The MAC campus also includes the historic 1898 Campbell House, library and archives, an auditorium and outdoor amphitheater. The exhibits and programs focus on three major disciplines: American Indian and other cultures, regional history and visual art.

The Joel E. Ferris Research Library & Archives is open via appointment.

== Gallery ==
The Navigators, a 2009 bronze sculpture by Brad Rude outside the main entrance

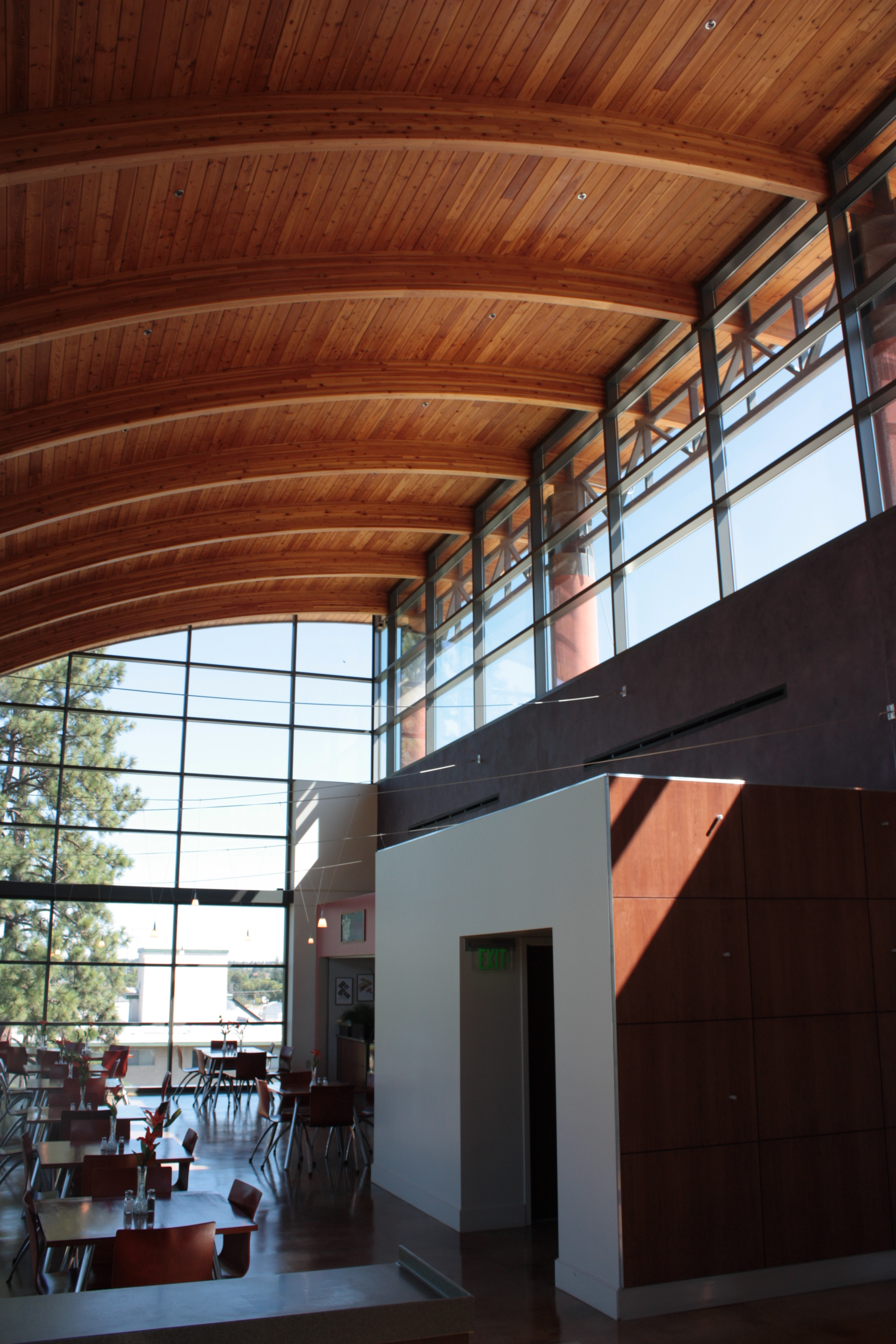
Interior lobby depicting the café
