= Campbell House (Spokane, Washington) =

- U.S. National Register of Historic Places
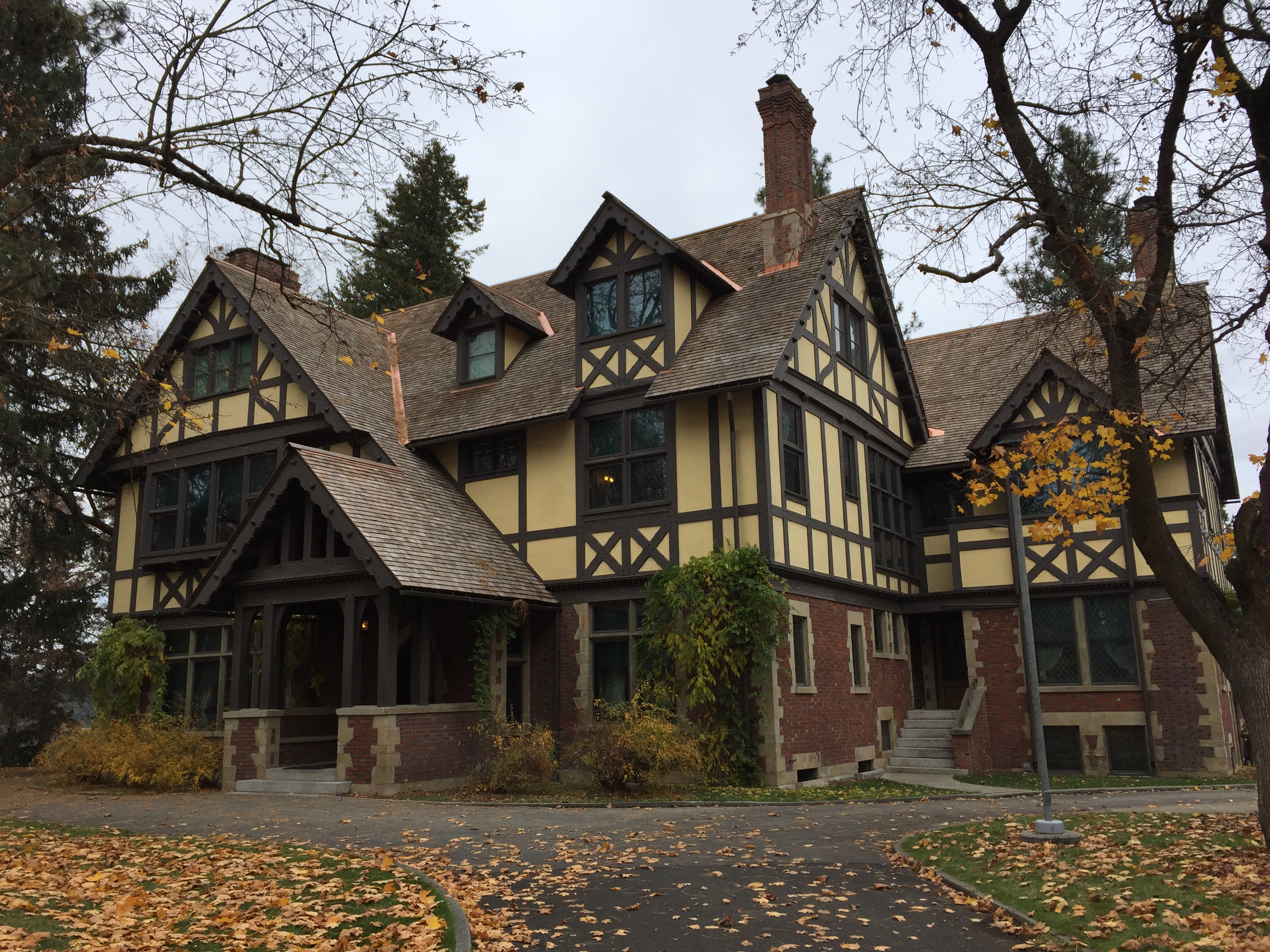
- Front exterior of the Campbell House

- Location within Washington (state) Location within the United States
- Interactive map showing the location of Campbell House
- Location: 2316 W. 1st Avenue; Spokane, Washington, U.S.
- Coordinates: 47°39′25″N 117°26′45″W
- Built: 1898
- Architect: Kirtland Kelsey Cutter
- Architectural style: Arts and Crafts Revival
- NRHP reference No.: 74001979
- Added to NRHP: May 31, 1974

Campbell House is a historic house preserved and stewarded by the Northwest Museum of Arts and Culture located in the Browne's Addition neighborhood of Spokane, Washington, United States. Built in 1898, the Arts and Crafts Revival-style house was designed by Kirtland Kelsey Cutter, known at the time as "Spokane's most fashionable architect", for Amasa B. Campbell (1845–1912), Grace M. Campbell (1859–1924), and their first and only child, Helen Campbell Powell (1892–1964).

Following Grace Campbell's death in 1924, Helen donated the house to the Eastern Washington State Historical Society in memory of her mother. Museum exhibits were housed in the building until the Northwest Museum of Arts and Culture, formerly the Cheney Cowles Memorial Museum, was completed next door in 1960. From 1984 to 2001, a formal restoration project impacted all elements of the Campbell House complex, from refurbishing the interior to re-wiring electrical components. Today, Campbell House operates as a house museum, interpreting life at the turn of the 20th century. It was listed in the National Register of Historic Places in 1974.

== Gallery ==
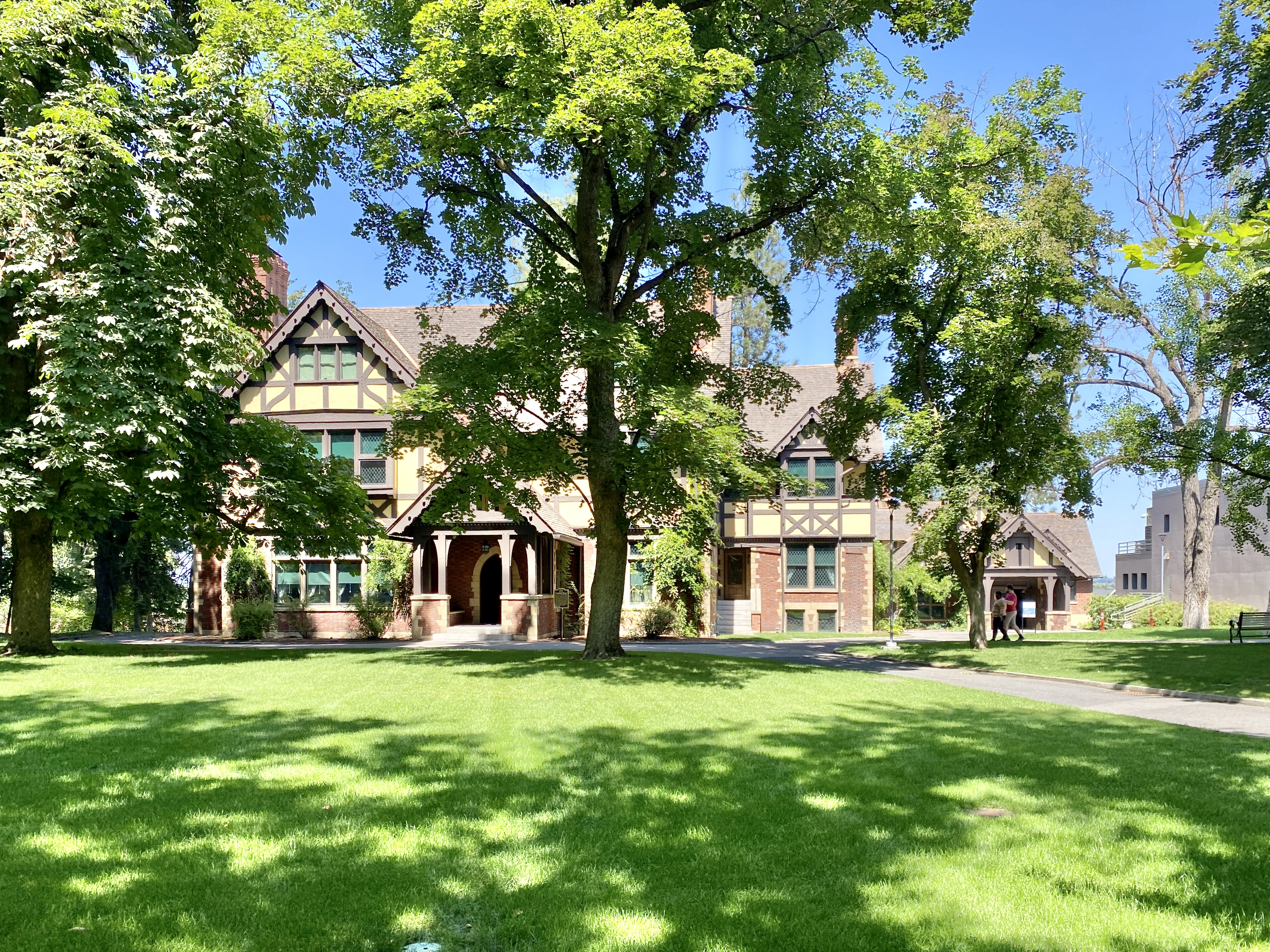
Campbell House in summer

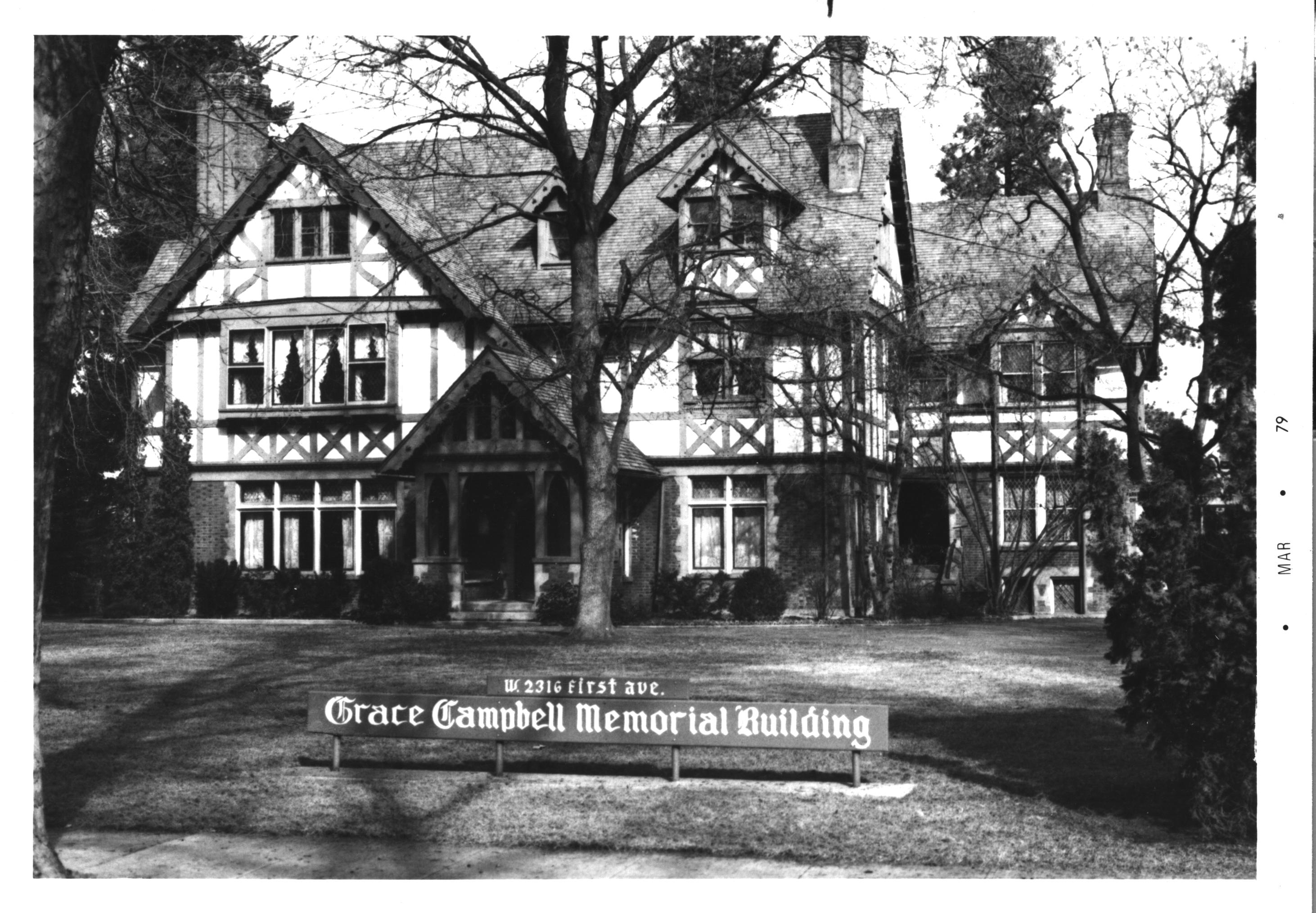
Campbell House, 1979
