= Kirtland Cutter =

American architect

Kirtland Kelsey Cutter
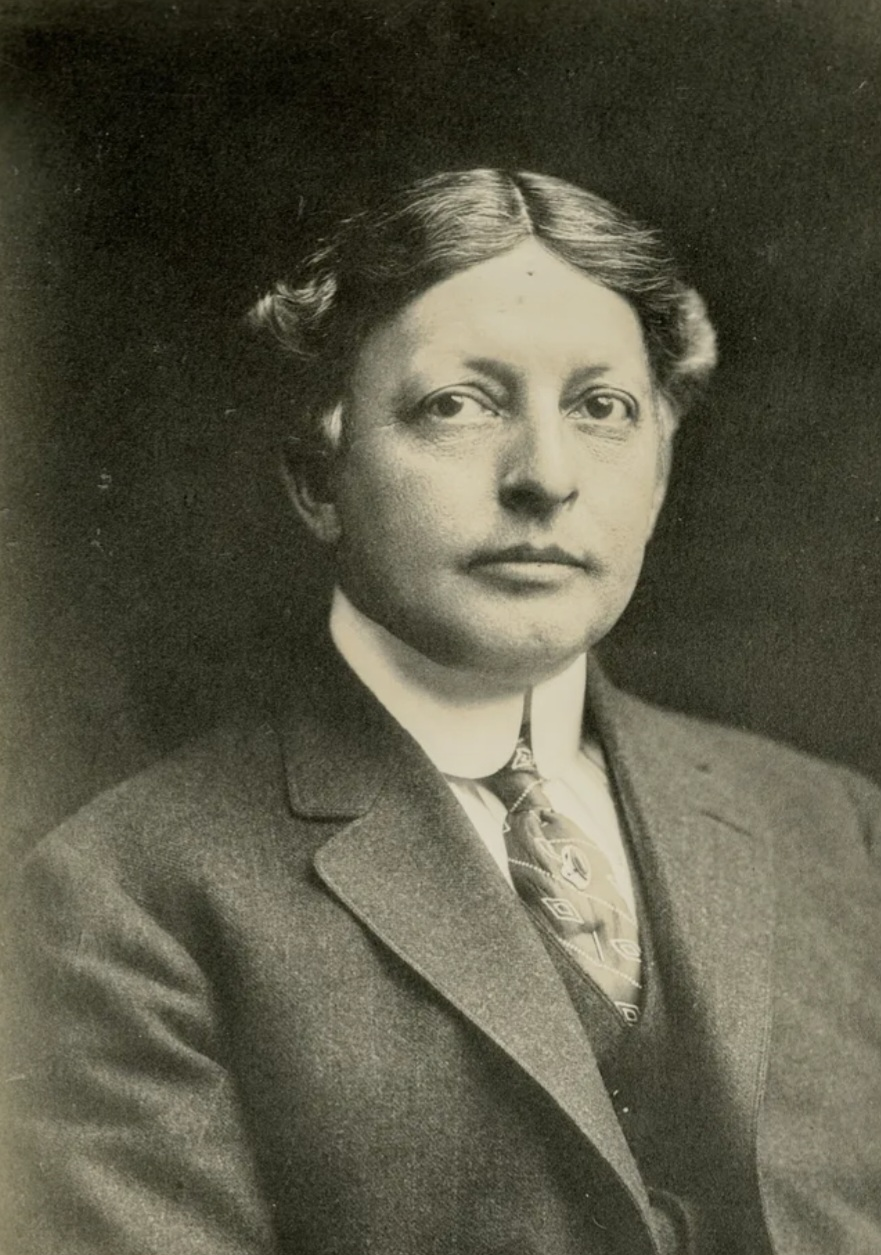
- Born: August 20, 1860; East Rockport, Ohio
- Died: September 26, 1939 (aged 79); Spokane, Washington
- Occupation: Architect
- Parent(s): Caroline Atwater Pease; William Cutter
- Buildings: Rainier Club; Lake McDonald Lodge; The Davenport Hotel
- Projects: Idaho Building at the Chicago's World Fair

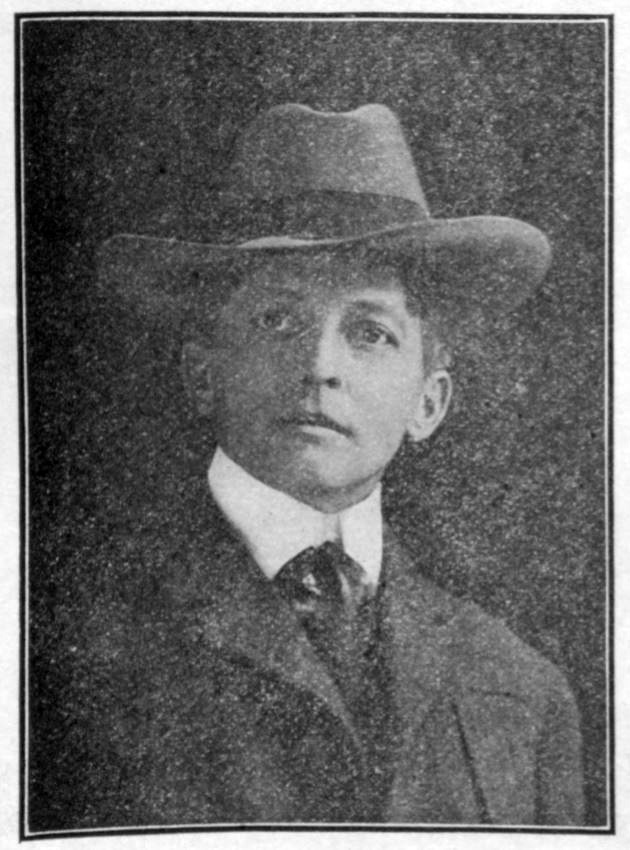
Kirtland Kelsey Cutter

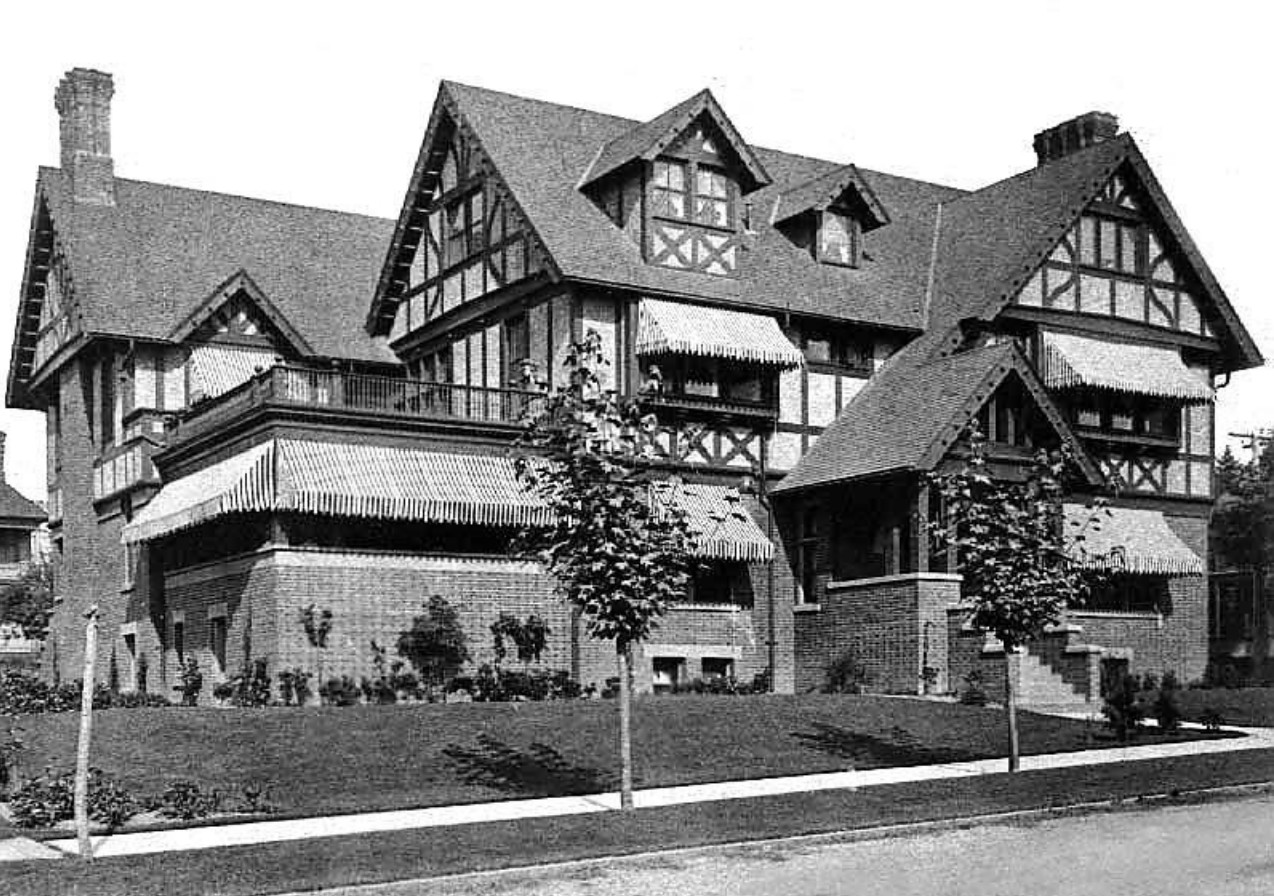
Stimson-Green Mansion, designed 1898 by Kirtland Cutter

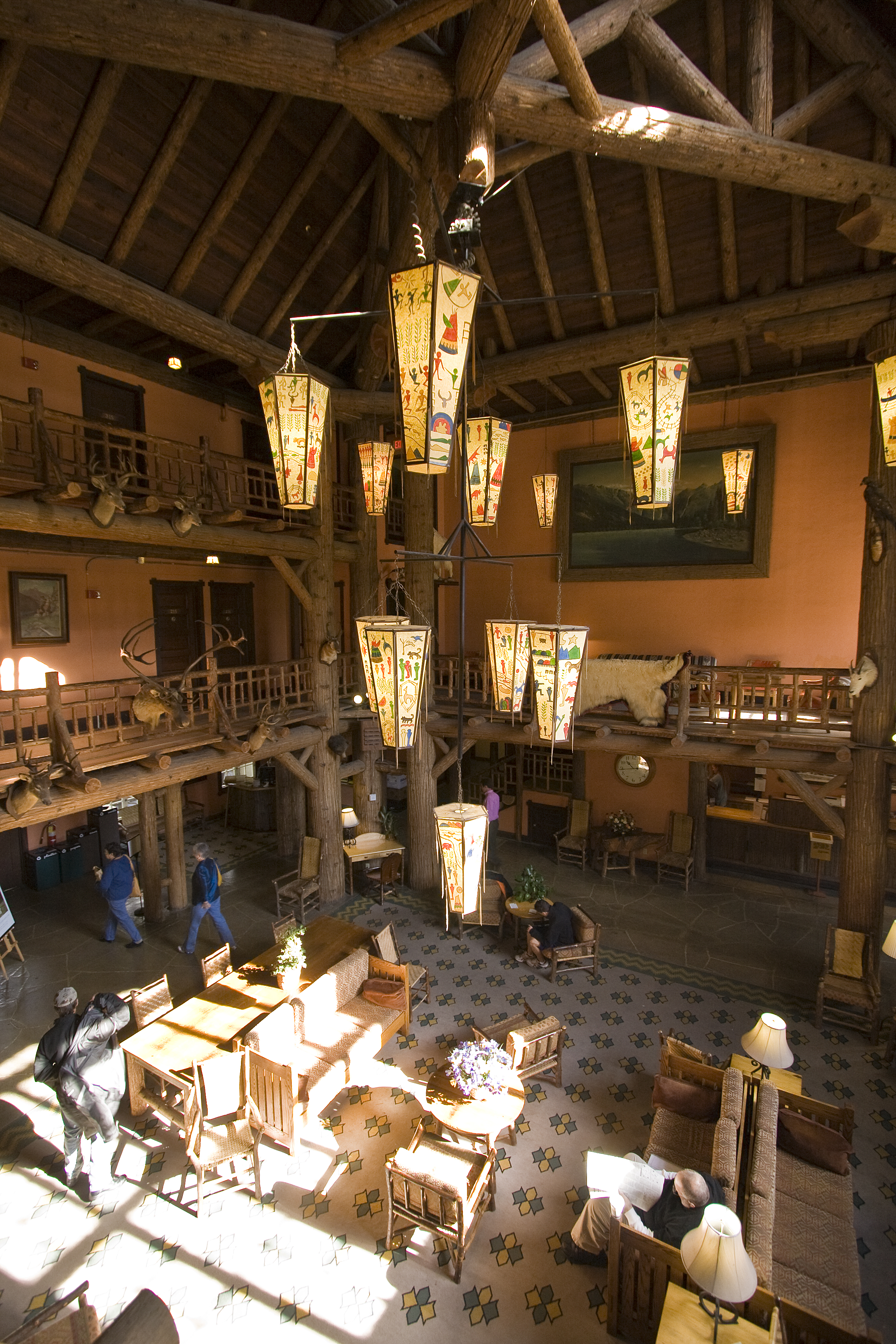
Interior of Lake McDonald Lodge, Glacier National Park; architect: Kirtland Kelsey Cutter.

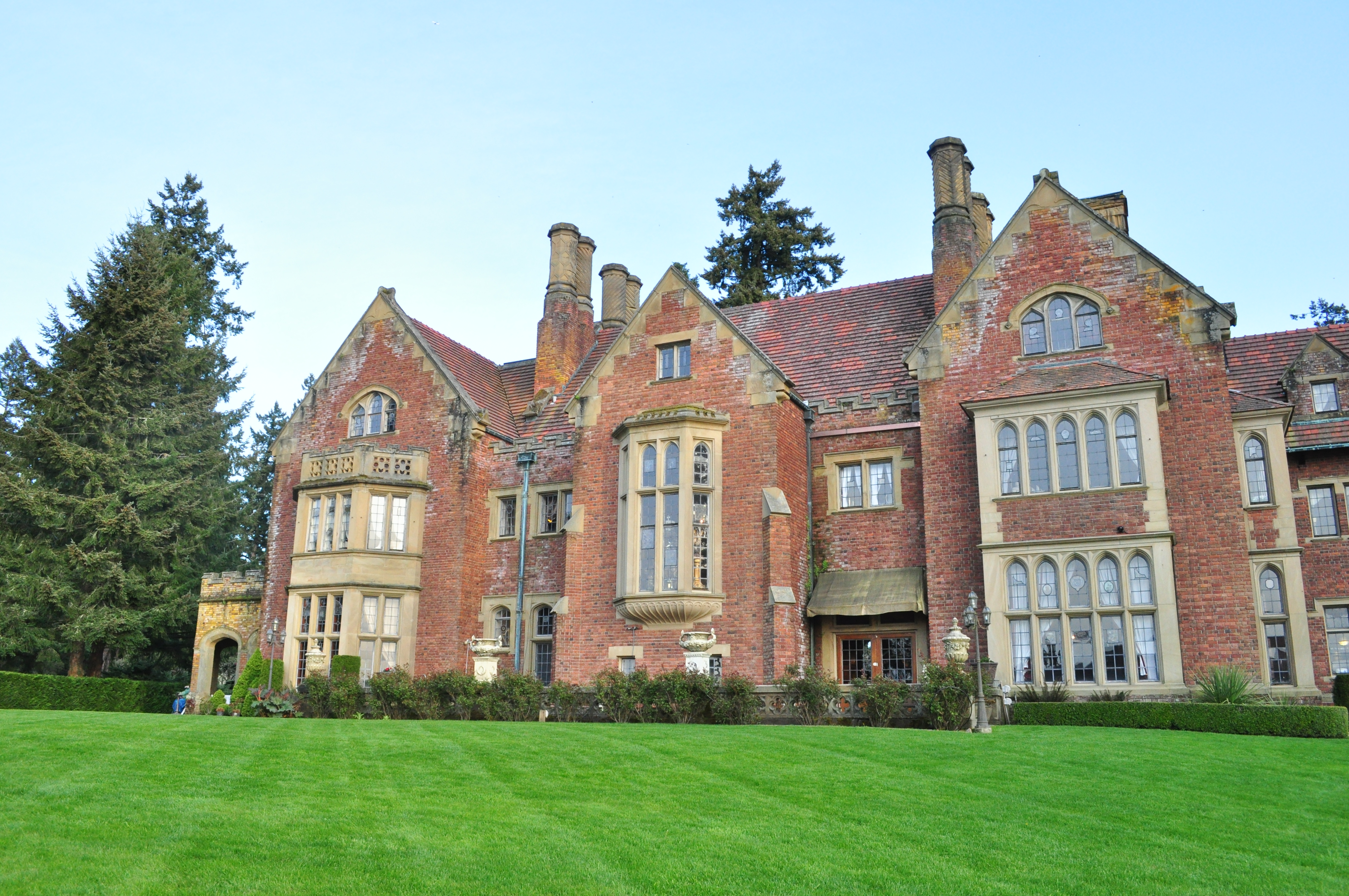
Thornewood Castle, former residence of Chester Thorne, Lakewood, Washington; architect Kirtland Kelsey Cutter; built 1911.

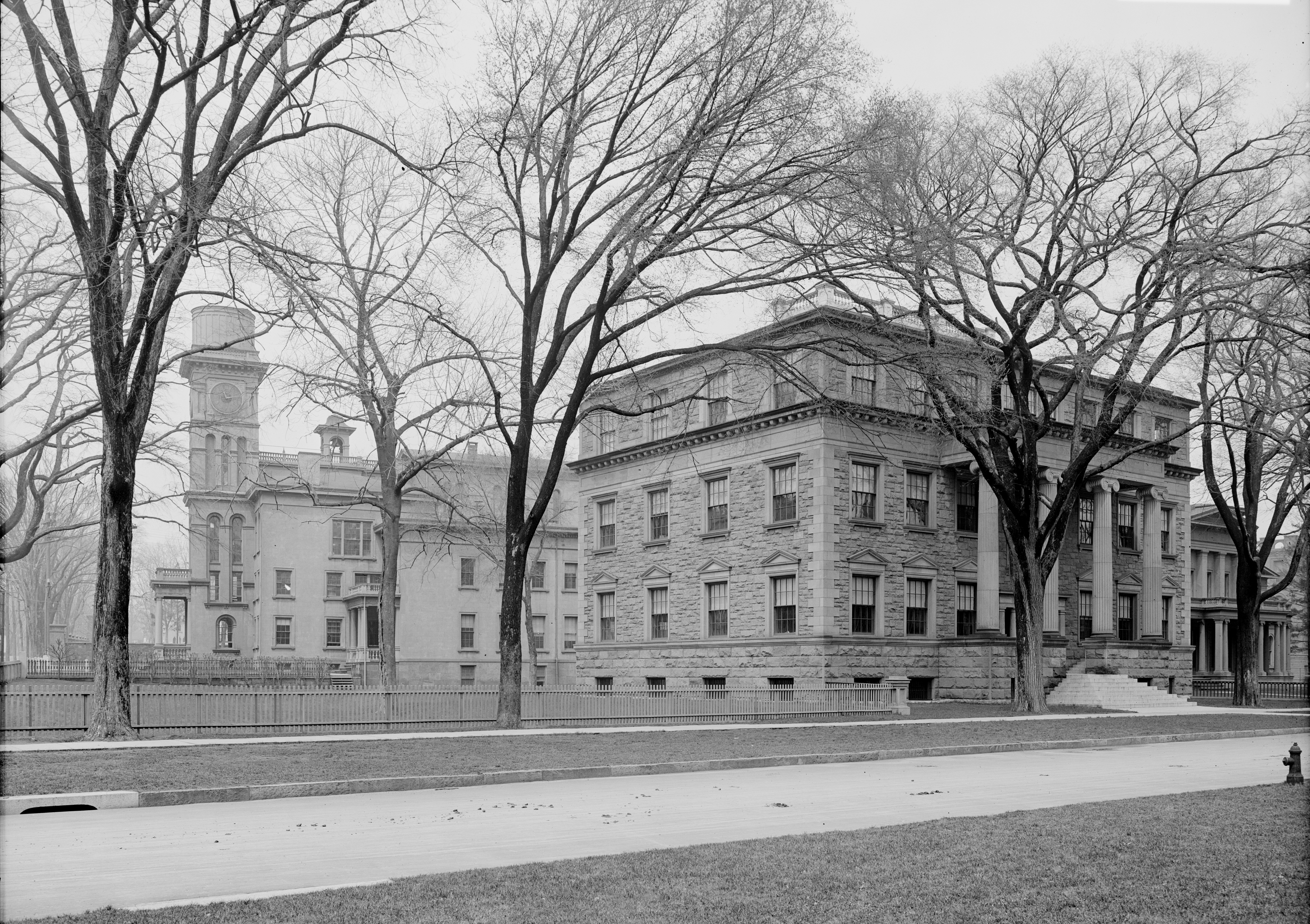
Foreground: Kirtland Hall, Yale University. Formerly on the Sheffield Scientific School Campus. (Architect: Kirtland Kelsey Cutter, 1902).

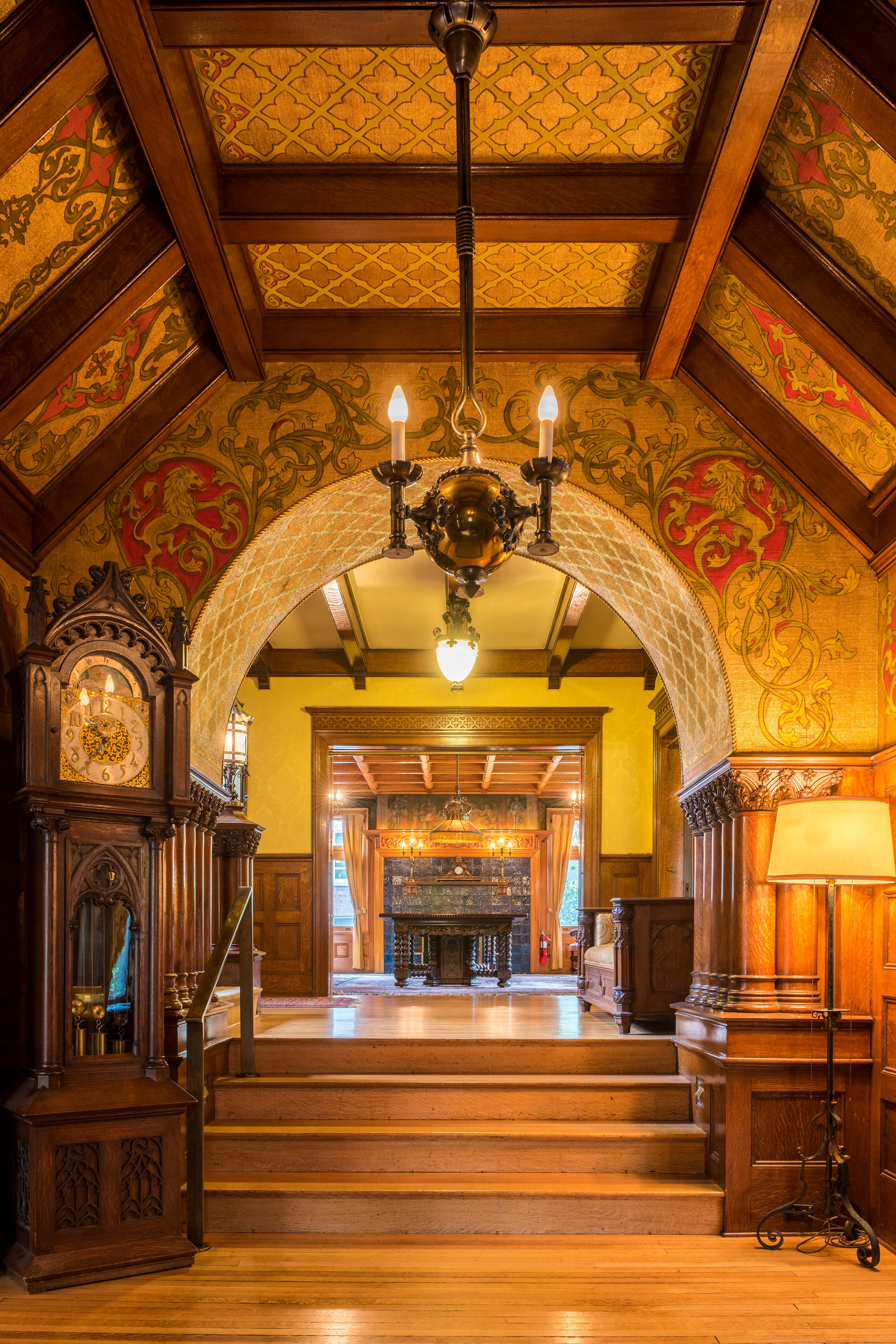
Entrance Hall, Stimson-Green Mansion, Seattle, Washington; Commissioned in 1898; Architect Kirtland Kelsey Cutter. Completed ca. 1901.

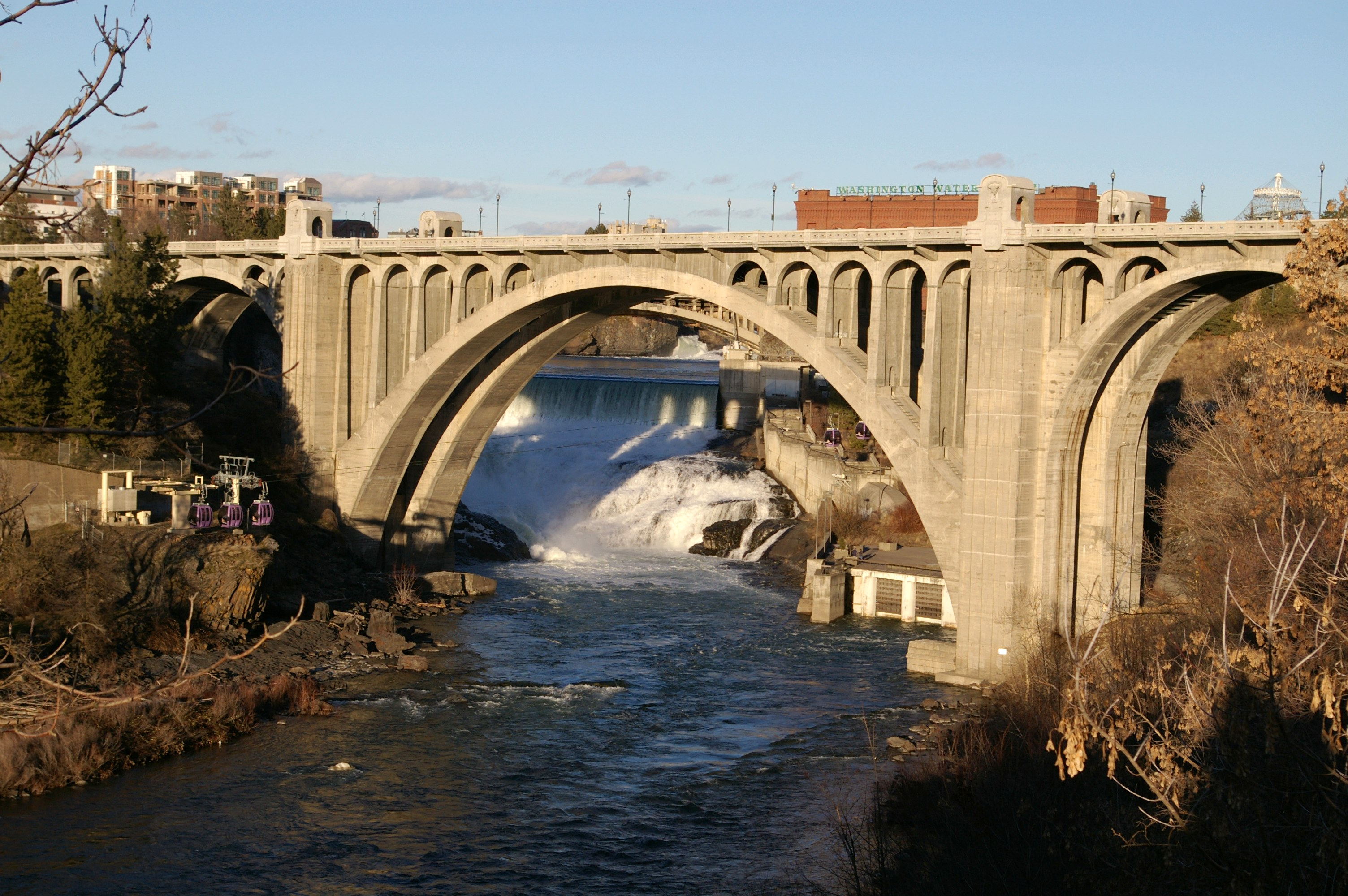
Monroe Street Bridge, Spokane, Washington; Designer/Architect: Kirtland Kelsey Cutter.

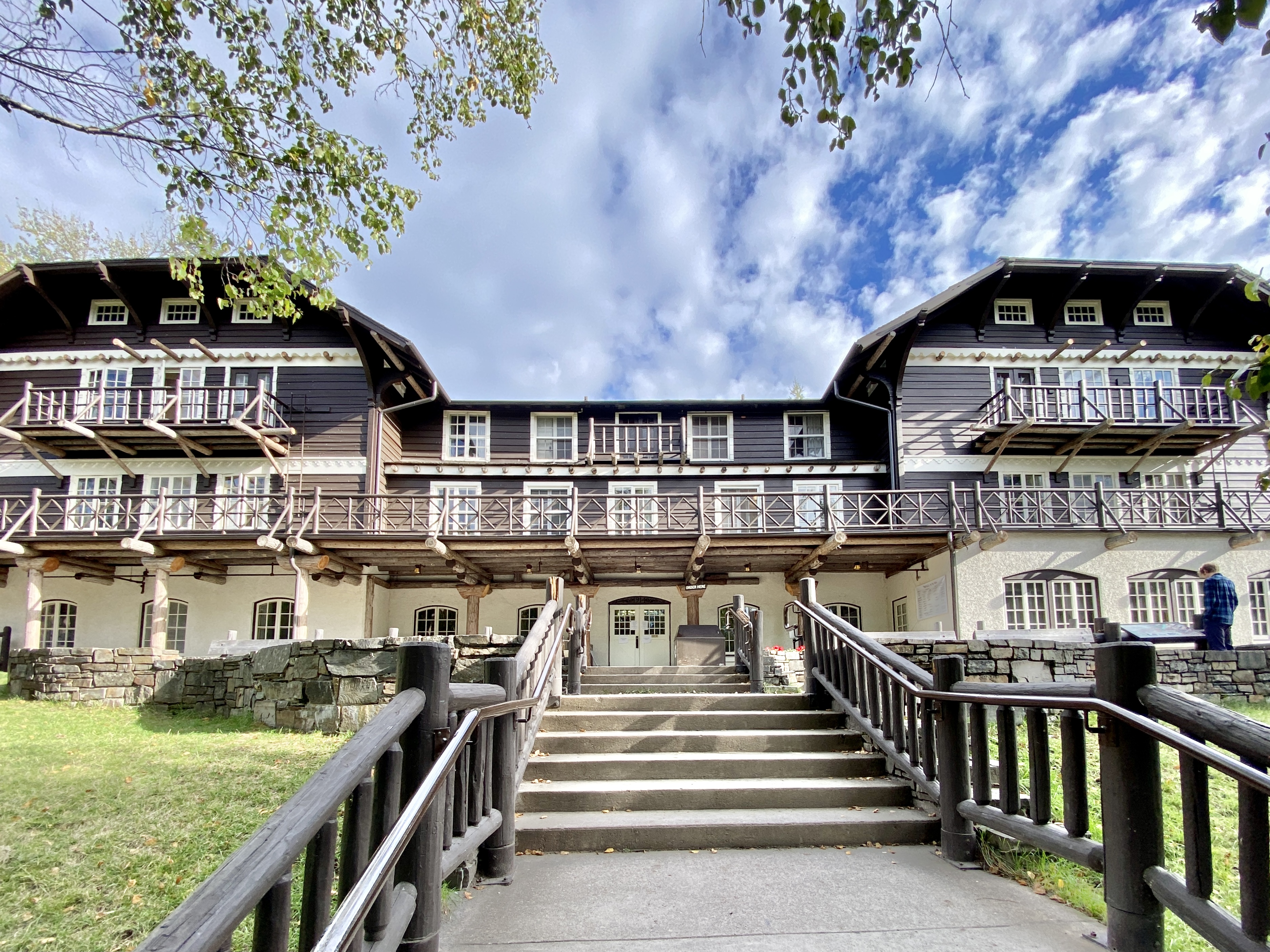
Lake McDonald Lodge exterior, Glacier National Park, Montana, USA; architect: Kirtland Kelsey Cutter.

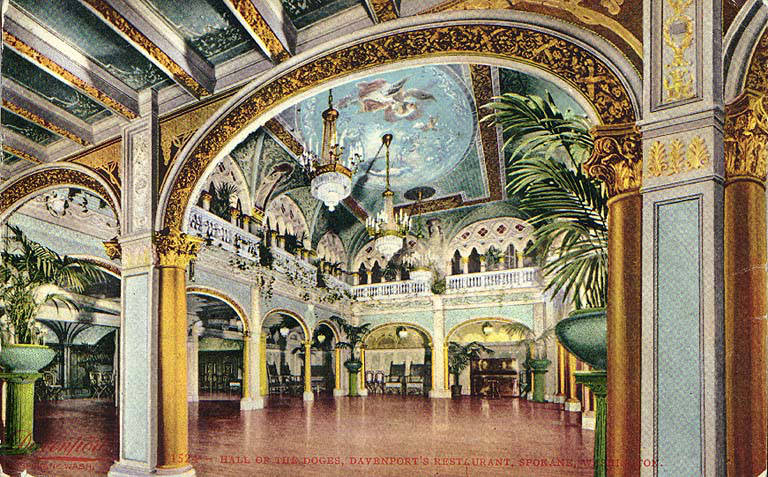
Hall of the Doges, Davenport's Hotel and Restaurant, Spokane, Washington. Image ca. 1908. Architect: Kirtland Kelsey Cutter.

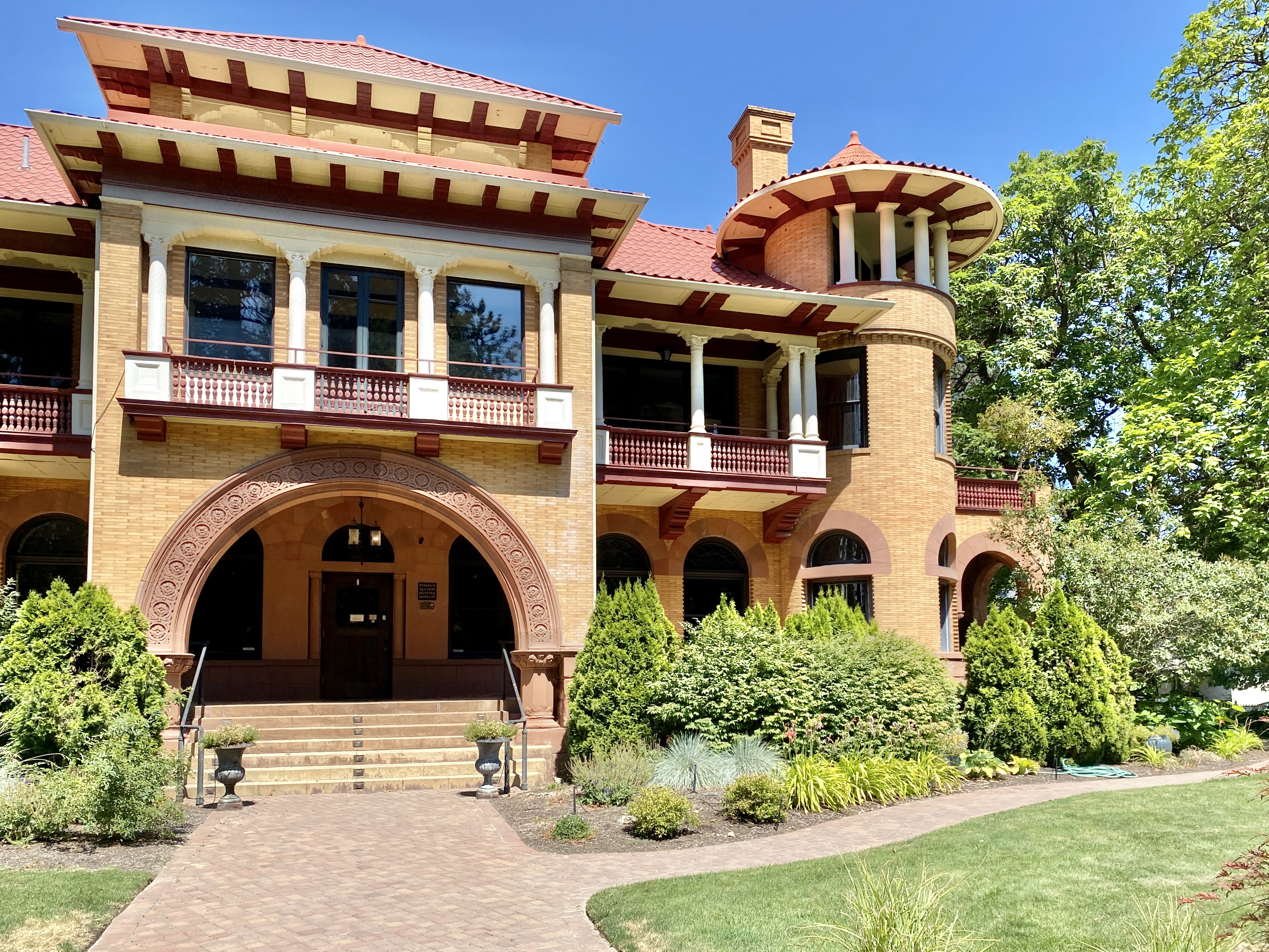
Patsy Clark House aka Patsy Clark Mansion, Spokane, Washington; architect: Kirtland Kelsey Cutter.

Kirtland Kelsey Cutter (August 20, 1860 – September 26, 1939) was a 20th-century architect in the Pacific Northwest and California. He was born in East Rockport, Ohio, the great-grandson of Jared Potter Kirtland. He studied painting and illustration at the Art Students League of New York. At the age of 26 he moved to Spokane, Washington, and began working as a banker for his uncle. By the 1920s, Cutter had designed several hundred buildings that established Spokane as a place rivaling Seattle and Portland, Oregon in its architectural quality. Most of Cutter's work is listed in State and National Registers of Historic Places.

His design for the 1893 Chicago World's Fair Idaho Building was a rustic design log construction. It was a popular favorite, visited by an estimated 18 million people. The building's design and interior furnishings were a major precursor of the Arts and Crafts movement.

Cutter also worked in partnership with Karl G. Malmgren as Cutter & Malmgren and variations.

== Notable designs ==
=== Buildings in Spokane, Washington ===
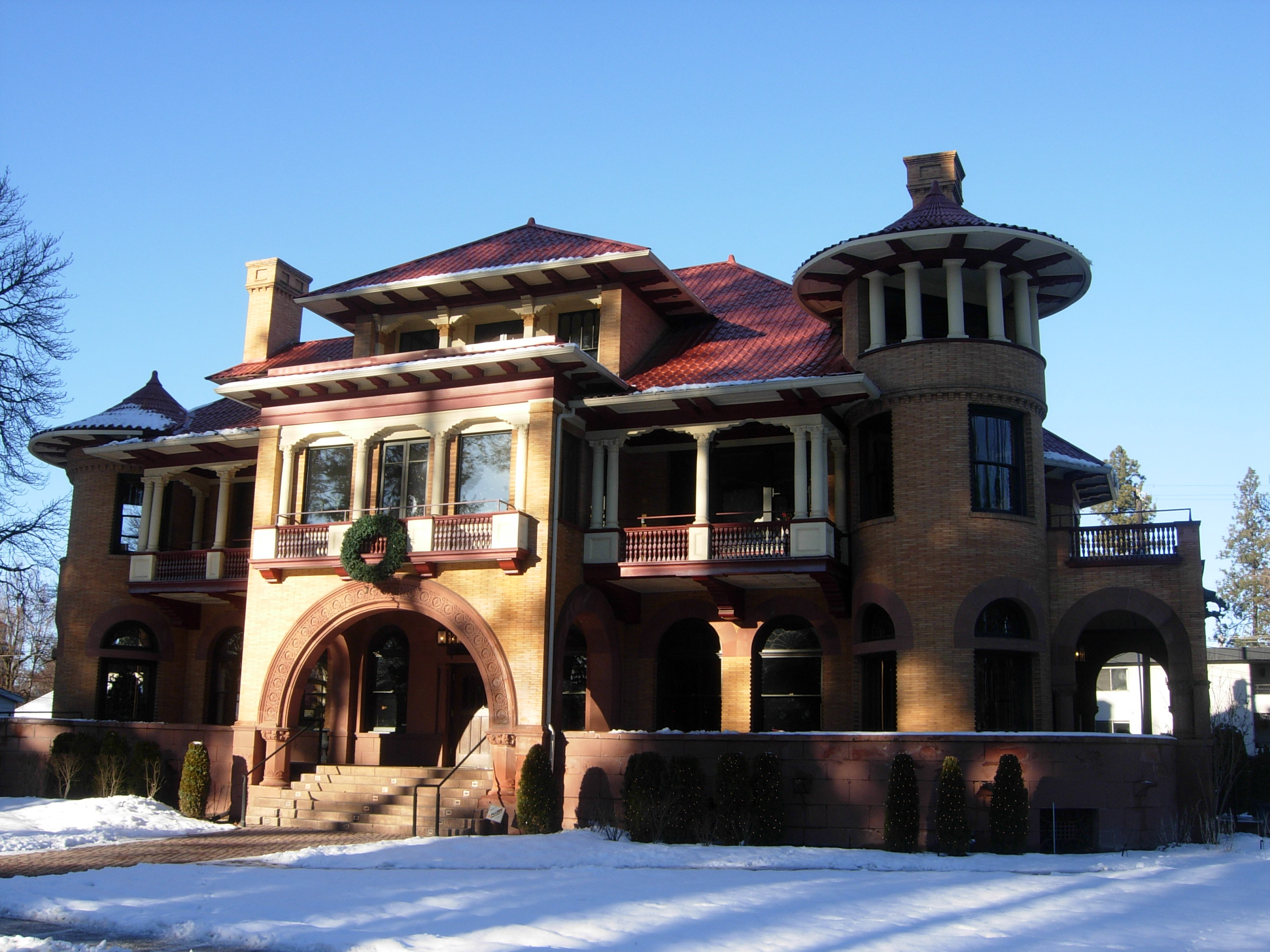
Patsy Clark Mansion

- 1887: Kirtland Cutter's Chalet Hohenstein 628 West 7th Avenue – was demolished to build condominiums in the 1960s
- 1888: Glover Mansion 321 W Eighth Avenue – Now a conference and events center.
- 1889: F. Lewis Clark Lodge Gate 705 West 7th Avenue – temporary home for Clark
- 1889: F. Lewis Clark House 703 West 7th Avenue – Clark named it Undercliff it was later changed to Marycliff
- 1889: F. Rockwood Moore House 507 West 7th Avenue
- 1897: John A. Finch House 2340 W First Avenue – Designed with Karl Malmgren.
- 1897: Austin Corbin House 815 West 7th Avenue
- 1897: D. C. Corbin House 507 West 7th Avenue – Now houses the Corbin Art Center
- 1898: Amasa B. Campbell House 2316 W First Avenue – Now part of the Northwest Museum of Arts and Culture.
- 1898: Patsy Clark Mansion 2208 West Second Avenue – Contains the largest stained glass window ever made by Tiffany Studios.
- 1898: Wakefield House, 2328 W First Avenue – First example of Mission Revival Style architecture in Washington State.
- c. 1900: Manito United Methodist Church, 3220 S Grand Blvd
- 1904: Robert E. Strahorn Residence Strahorn Pines designed by J.J. Browne in 1887 remodeled by Cutter
- 1907: J.M. Corbet Corbet-Aspray House 820 West 7th Avenue
- 1907: Gardner and Engdahl/The Gables Apartments 1302–1312 West Broadway Avenue
- 1909: Post Street Electric Substation – designed for Washington Water Power, now called Avista
- c. 1910: The Hall of Doges, above Davenport's Restaurant – see The Davenport Hotel
- 1910: Spokane Club, 1002 W Riverside Avenue
- 1910: Western Union Life Insurance Building
- 1911: Monroe Street Bridge – Designed aesthetic elements.
- 1912: Waikiki Mansion – Now Gonzaga University's Bozarth Center.
- 1912: Louis Davenport House 34 West 8th Avenue
- 1914: The Davenport Hotel
- 1915: Sherwood Building 510 West Riverside

=== Other Washington State sites ===
- 1892: Wardner's Castle 1103 15th Street, Bellingham, Washington.
- 1893: Cutter House 802 North Yakima Avenue, Tacoma, Washington
- 1898: Charles Stimson's Stimson-Green Mansion, 1204 Minor Ave, Seattle, Washington
- 1904: Rainier Club, Seattle, Washington
- 1905: Remodeling of the Tacoma Hotel, Tacoma, Washington, – Designed by McKim, Mead & White in 1883.
- 1906-1908: Charles J. Smith house, 1147 Harvard Avenue E, Seattle
- 1908: Seattle Golf and Country Club
- c. 1909 Yale Hotel in Chewelah – Designed with Karl Malmgren.
- 1909: Thornewood Castle, Lakewood, Washington – Set of Rose Red TV movie by Stephen King
- 1912: Cutter Theatre, Metaline Falls, Washington – Formerly the Metaline Falls High School Building
- 1912: Rock House, 102 5th Ave Metaline Falls, Washington – Private residence on the Pend Oreille River.
- 1922: Heather Hill 11430 Gravelly Lake Dr SW, Tacoma

=== Out of state locations ===
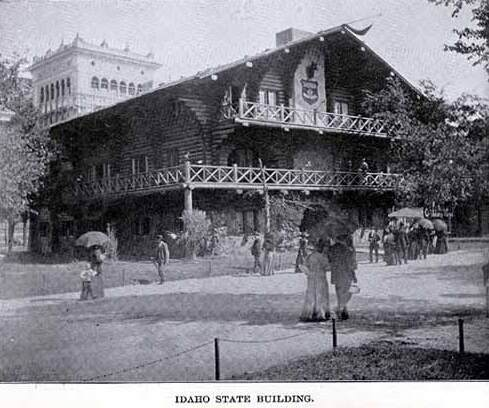
Idaho Building

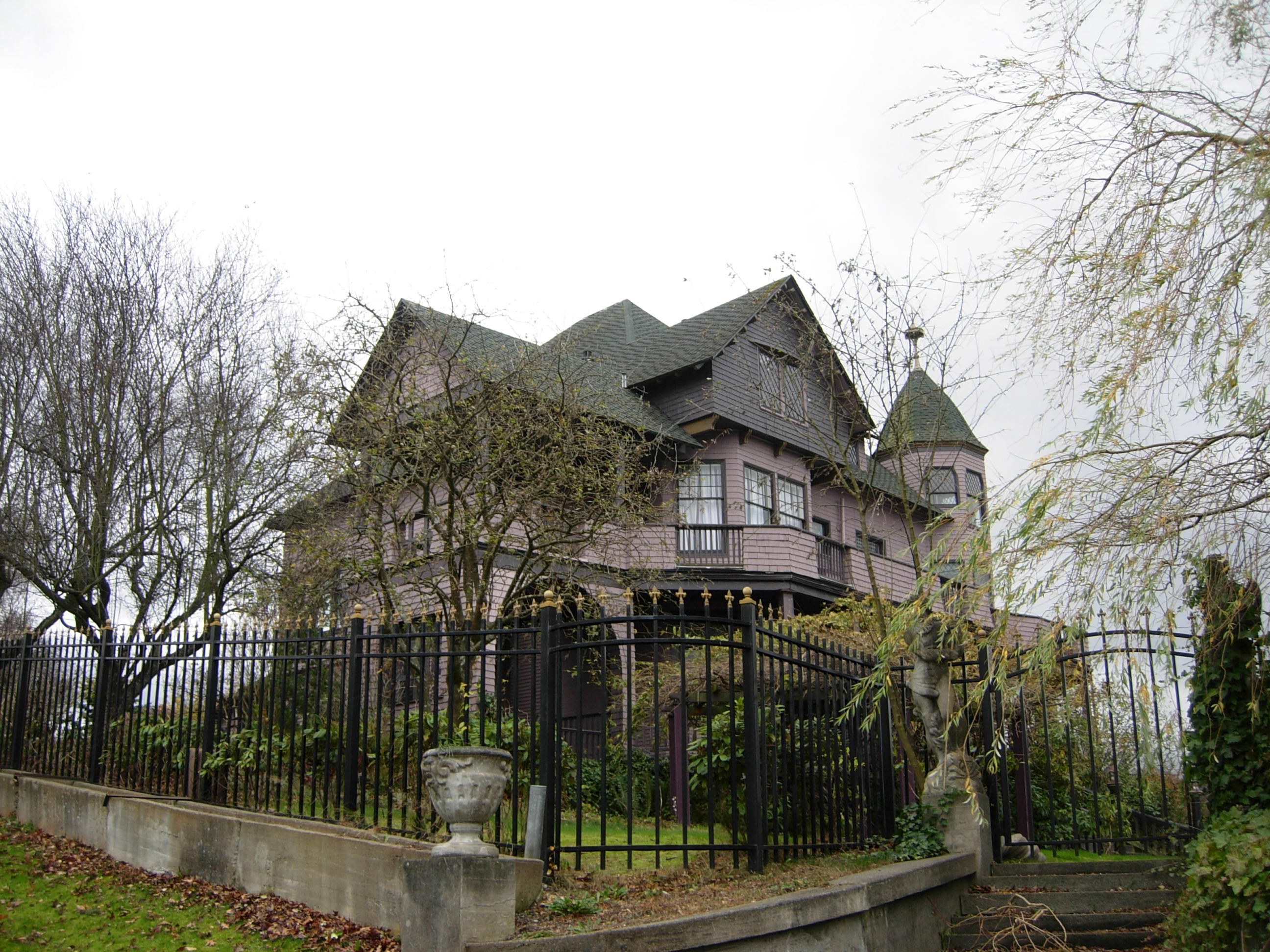
- Wardner's Castle, Bellingham, WA.
  1893: Idaho Building, Chicago, Illinois for World's Columbian Exposition in partnership with John C. Poetz
- 1895: Charles E. Conrad Mansion, Kalispell, Montana
- 1902: Kirtland Hall, New Haven, Connecticut – Sheffield Scientific School
- 1903: Carnegie Camp North Point, Raquette Lake, New York- Summer Home of Lucy Carnegie
- 1904: Idaho State Building, St. Louis, Missouri for Louisiana Purchase Exposition.
- 1906: The Hurlbut Mansion, Lewiston, Idaho – Formerly the Children's Home Finding and Aid Society of North Idaho
- 1907: Fredrick Blackwell Residence - Located in Spirit Lake, IDAHO - designed by Cutter
- 1907: Bozanta Tavern - Later became Hayden Lake Country Club in 1927, Hayden Lake, Idaho
- 1910: Holy Trinity Episcopal Church, Wallace, Idaho
- 1913: John P.and Stella Gray Estate, Coeur d'Alene, Idaho
- 1913: Lake McDonald Lodge, Glacier National Park
- 1913: William H. Cowles House Eucalyptus Hill Santa Barbara, California
- 1917: Wilcox Manor, Portland, Oregon
- 1922: Lewis-Clark Hotel, Lewiston, Idaho
- 1926: Autzen Mansion, Portland, Oregon
- 1929: Los Cerritos, Long Beach, California – three homes in subdivision
- 1937: Fleming House, Balboa Island, Newport Beach, California – Built for Victor Fleming, director of The Wizard of Oz and Gone with the Wind
