= Cutter & Malmgren =

US architectural firm

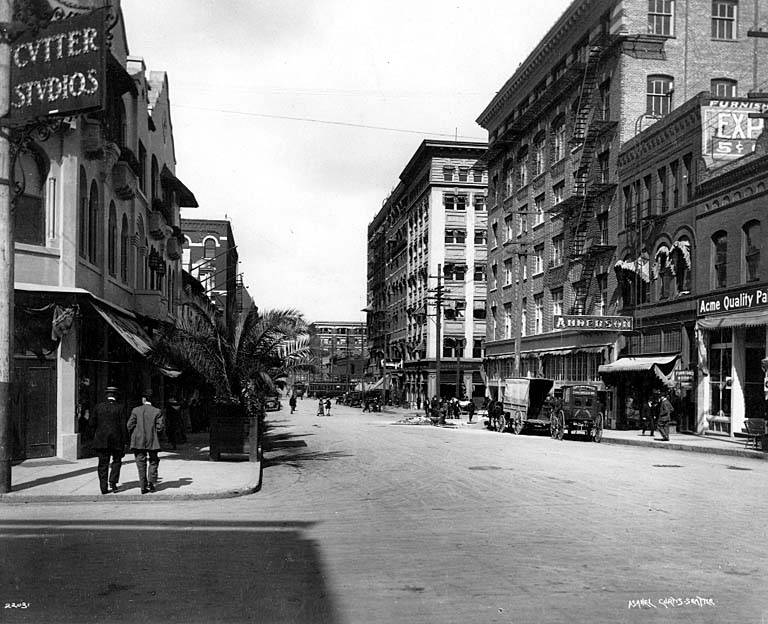
Cutter Studios in 1911

Cutter & Malmgren was an architectural firm of Kirtland K. Cutter and Karl G. Malmgren in Spokane, Washington that existed from c.1889 to 1917. The firm designed multiple buildings that are listed on the U.S. National Register of Historic Places.

The firm was founded in c.1889 by Cutter and John Poetz as Cutter & Poetz. Upon Poetz's retirement, it was reorganized as Cutter & Malmgren. The partnership closed in 1917, after which Cutter continued in individual practice.

== Work ==
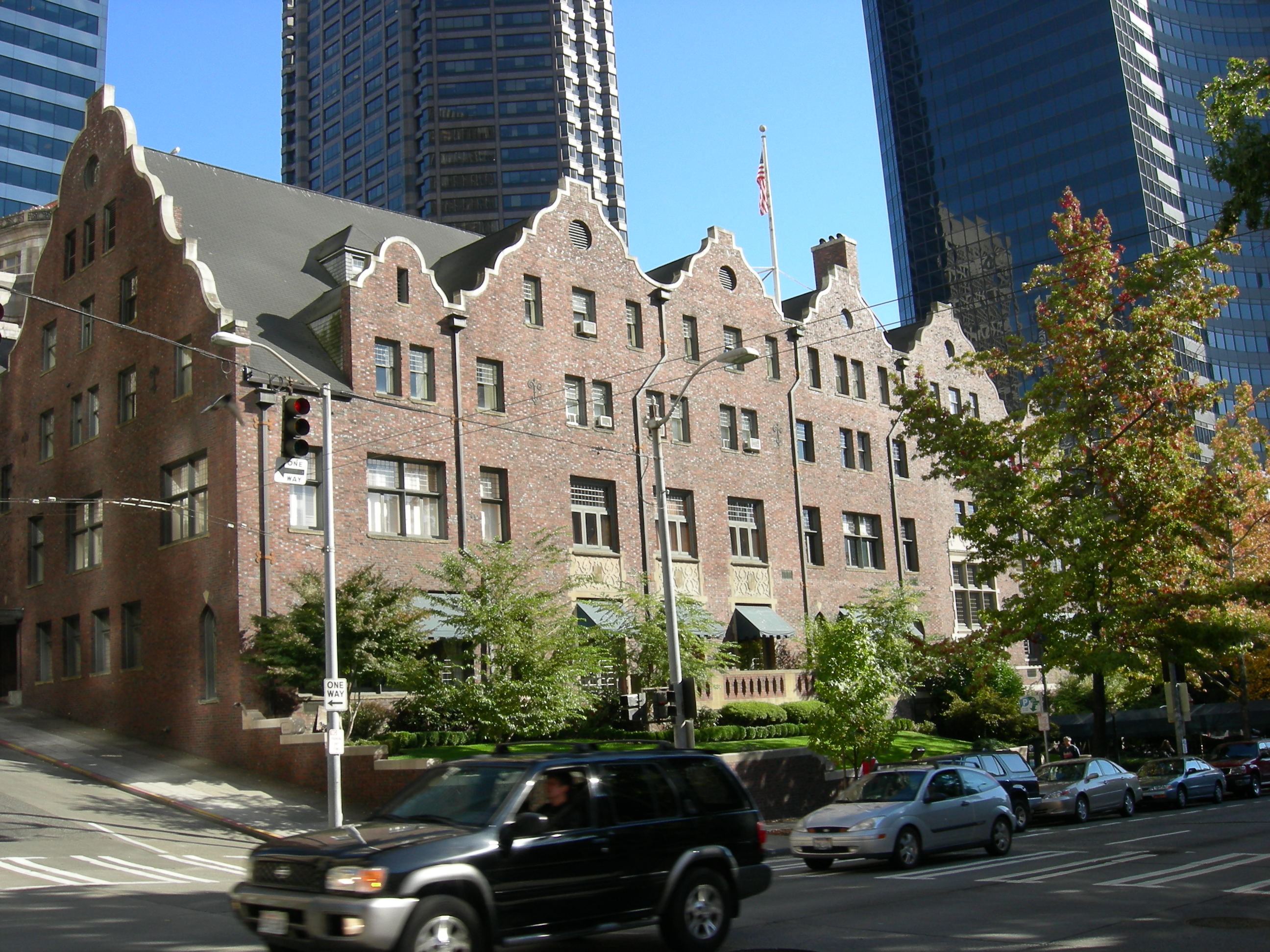
Rainier Club

Works of the partnership or Malmgren alone (with attribution specifics) include:

- Daniel C. and Anna Corbin House, 507 W. Seventh Ave., Spokane (Cutter & Malmgren), NRHP-listed
- Finch House, W. 2340 1st Ave., S. 104 Poplar, Spokane, built c. 1897.
- Metaline Falls School, 302 Park, Metaline Falls, WA (Cutter & Malmgren), NRHP-listed
- Rainier Club, 810 4th Ave., Seattle, WA (Cutter & Malmgren), NRHP-listed Built 1903 in Tudor Revival, Jacobethan Revival style.
- Sperry Chalets, E of West Glacier, West Glacier, Montana (Cutter & Malmgren), NRHP-listed
- Spokane Sash and Door Company Flats, 1302-1312 W Broadway Ave., Spokane (Cutter & Malmgren), NRHP-listed
- St. Andrews Episcopal Church, 120 E. Woodin Ave., Chelan, Washington (Malmgren, Karl G.), NRHP-listed
- Dr. Charles and Elsie Thomas House, 1212 N. Summit Blvd., Spokane (Cutter & Malmgren), NRHP-listed
- Ralston and Sarah Wilbur House, 2525 E. 19th Ave., Spokane (Cutter & Malmgren), NRHP-listed
- One or more contributing elements in Nettleton's Addition Historic District, an area bounded by W. Summit, Mission, N Summit, A St. Bridge, and Chestnut, Spokane (Cutter & Malmgren), NRHP-listed
- One or more contributing elements in Ninth Avenue Historic District, roughly bounded by 7th Ave., Monroe St., 12th Ave. and the Burlington Northern RR tracks, Spokane (Cutter and Malmgren), NRHP-listed
- Clubhouse, Seattle Golf Club, Shoreline, Washington
