= Karl G. Malmgren =

Swedish-born American architect

- Born: 1862; Örebro, Sweden
- Died: May 21, 1921 (aged 58); Spokane, Washington, U.S.
- Occupation: Architect

Karl Gunnar Malmgren (1862 – May 21, 1921) was an architect in the Pacific Northwest. During much of his career, he worked in partnership with architect Kirtland Cutter (1860–1939).

== Biography ==
Malmgren was born in Örebro, Sweden and studied architecture and decorative arts throughout Sweden and Germany. Malmgren worked with Swedish architect, P.L. Anderson for seven years upon completing his schooling. Malmgren immigrated to the United States in 1888, initially settling in Seattle. In 1889, Malmgren moved to Spokane and started working for K. R. Cutter and Company, also known as Cutter & Poetz. With the retirement of John Poetz in 1894/1895, the firm was restructured as Cutter & Malmgren. The partnership closed in 1917, after which Karl Malmgren and Kirtland Cutter continued in individual practice. Around 1919, Malmgren entered partnership with Spokane architect Charles I. Carpenter (1888-1938).

== Personal life ==
Malmgren married Mary Arneson in 1891 and they eventually had five children: Louise, Carl, Marie, Arthur and Frances. He died from throat cancer in Spokane on May 21, 1921, at age 58.
