= Riverfront Park (Spokane, Washington) =

Urban park and Expo '74 legacy site in Spokane, Washington, United States

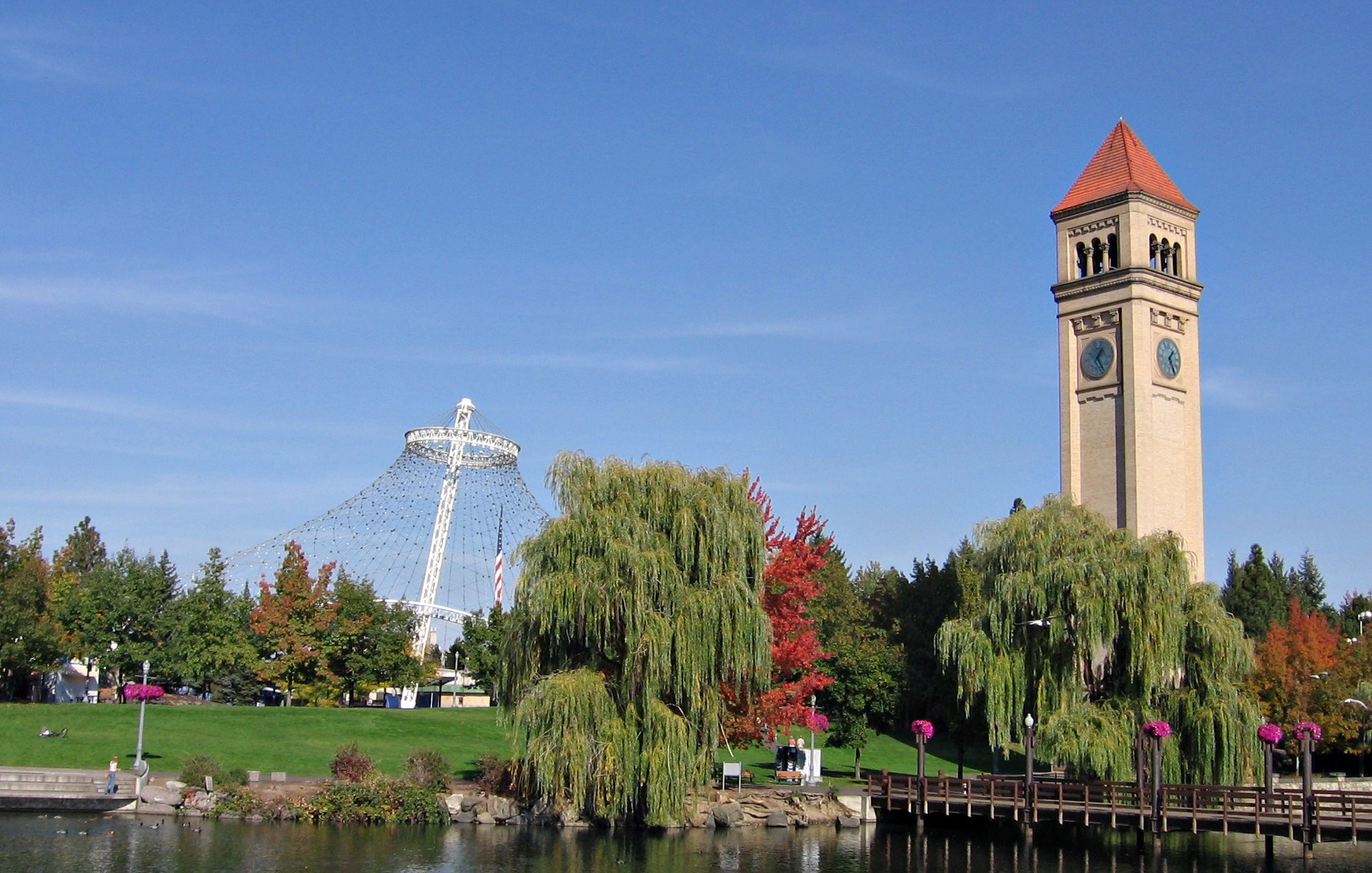
- Riverfront Park in 2005.
- Interactive map of Riverfront Park
- Type: Urban park
- Location: Riverside, Spokane, Washington, U.S.
- Coordinates: 47°39′45″N 117°25′12″W
- Area: 100 acres (0.40 km^{2})
- Opened: May 5, 1978, 48 years ago
- Operator: Spokane Parks & Recreation Department
- Visitors: about 3 million annually
- Status: Open year round (daily, 6 am to midnight)
- Public transit: Spokane Transit Authority; Routes: 6,11, 25, 26, 27, 28
- Website: RiverfrontSpokane.org

Riverfront Park, branded as Riverfront Spokane, is a public urban park in downtown Spokane, Washington that is owned and operated by the Spokane Parks & Recreation Department. The 100-acre (40 ha) park is situated along the Spokane River and encompasses the Upper Spokane Falls, which is the largest urban waterfall in the United States.

The site of the park and the surrounding falls were a Native American gathering place, which had a number of fishing camps near the base of the falls. The first American settlers came in 1871, establishing a claim and building a sawmill near the falls that would later be purchased by James N. Glover, who was aware of the water power potential of the falls and that the Northern Pacific Railroad Company had received a government charter to build a main line through the area. By the late 19th century, much of the area along the Spokane Falls had become industrialized with sawmills and flour mills, utilizing the fast-moving Spokane River and Spokane Falls for its hydropower. Flumes and waterwheels were used to mechanically drive sawmills and flour mills located along the river. To satisfy the growing demand for electricity and modernize the city, the Washington Water Power company constructed a timber dam (replaced in 1974) on the river at the Lower Falls in 1890 and another dam on the Upper Falls in 1922. These operating hydroelectric facilities on the falls from the park's industrial past are among the sights of interest in Riverfront Park.

Located on the site of a former railyard, the park site's potential as a showcase for the Spokane Falls was recognized as early as 1908, but it would be another 64 years before those visions could be realized. Downtown Spokane, including what is now Riverfront Park was a hub for passenger and freight rail transport and remained that way for several decades. In 1972, the active railyards were removed, and the area around the Spokane Falls reclaimed, when construction commenced on an urban renewal project that built a fairground to host the upcoming environmentally-themed Expo '74 World's fair. Post-fair plans for the site which hosted the fair from May 4 to November 3, 1974, called for the preservation of the site as a legacy of Expo '74 and converting it into an urban park after the fair's conclusion. After several years of work to convert the site, Riverfront Park was officially opened in 1978. Several of its most recognizable buildings such as the U.S. Pavilion, Spokane Convention Center, and First Interstate Center for the Arts remain from Expo '74 as legacy pieces. The park is also home to historic features such as the Great Northern clock tower and Looff Carrousel; other sites of interest near the park include the River Park Square mall, Mobius Science Center, and The Podium sportplex. The park sees over three million visitors annually and has a Spokane Visitor Information Center at 620 W. Spokane Falls Boulevard with maps and information on local attractions, history, and tours.

== Location and overview ==
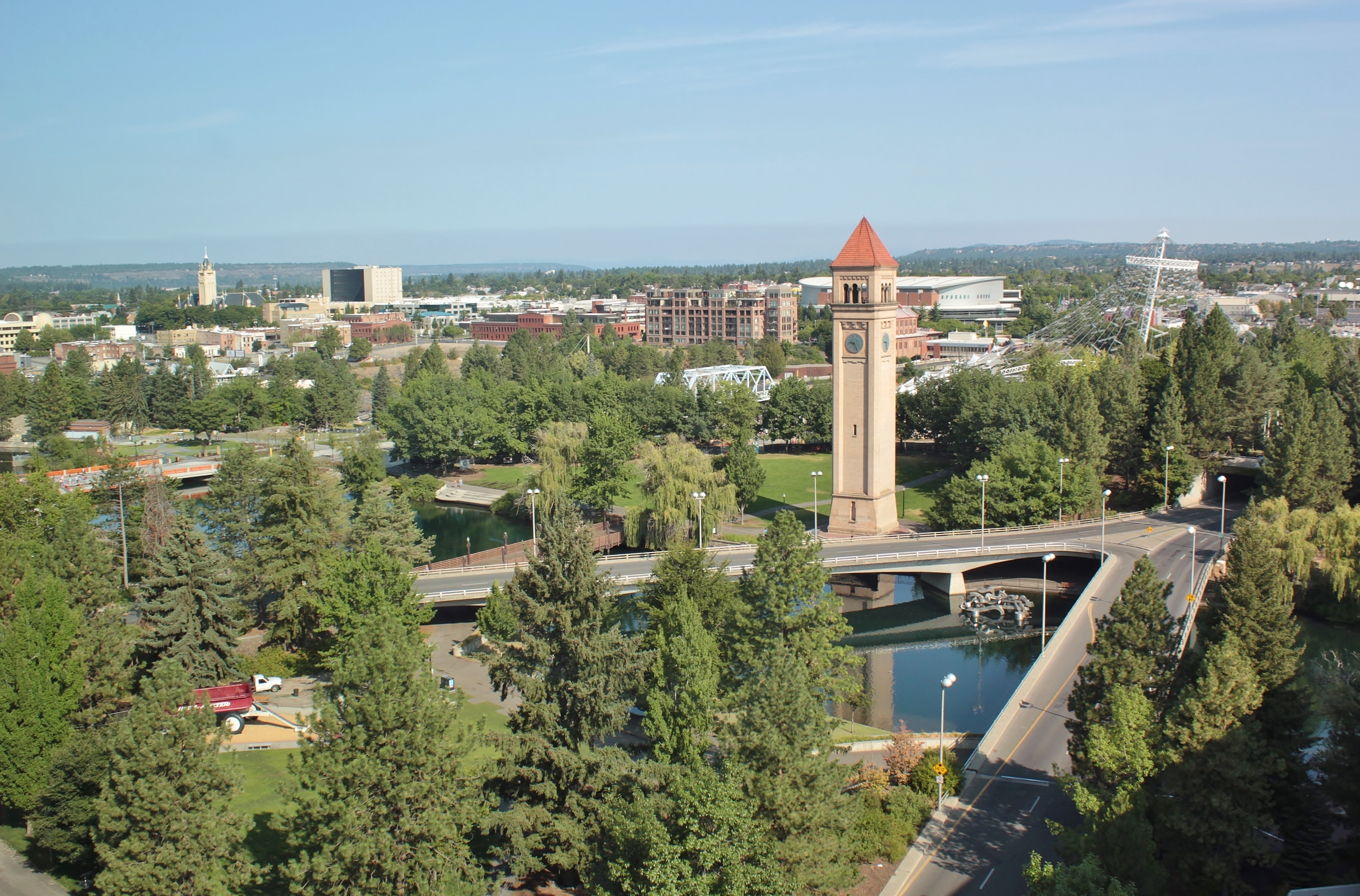
Riverfront Park is situated within an urban context in Downtown Spokane.

=== Geography ===
Riverfront Park is located just north of the downtown Spokane core, in Spokane's Riverside neighborhood, and is generally bounded by Spokane Falls Boulevard to the south, Post Street to the west, and the northern banks of the Spokane River, and Division Street to the east. Portions of its North Bank area extend farther north from the river, bounded by Howard Street to the west, Cataldo Avenue to the north, and Washington Street to the east. A majority of the park's elevation ranges from 1,880 feet (570 m) to 1,890 feet (580 m) above sea level, placing it more or less level with the surrounding downtown Spokane, but the elevation varies as one moves onto the park's two islands and closer to the Spokane River.

The Spokane River and its waterfalls, the park's namesake and main natural attraction, flows from east to west through the park, beginning as a single run, and eventually splitting up across three channels, creating the two main islands featured in the park. The first split into a northern and southern channel creates Havermale Island, the larger of the two islands. Further downstream, at around the midpoint of Havermale Island, the northern channel splits again into the north and mid channels, creating snxw meneɂ (pronounced sin-HOO-men-huh, which means "Salmon People" Island in Salish), formerly known as Canada Island. These northern two channels contain the Upper Spokane Falls, surrounding snxw meneɂ. All three channels converge back into a single run just downstream of the Upper Falls. The park's Upper Spokane Falls is the second largest urban waterfall in the United States.

=== Areas ===
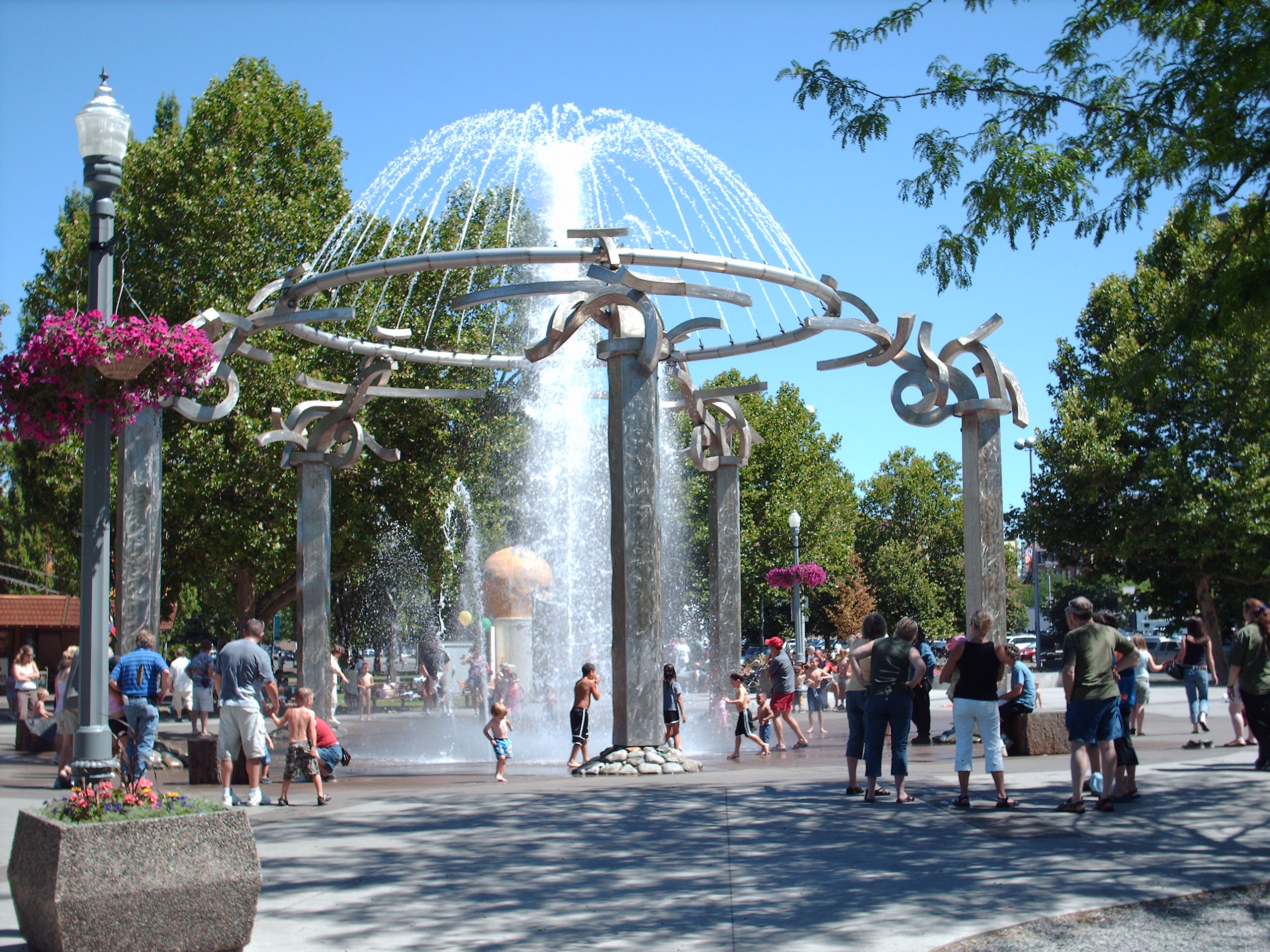
The Rotary Fountain

Riverfront Park can be described through several unofficial, general areas: the South Channel area, Havermale Island, and the North Bank area. The South Channel area of the park is located along the southern branch of the Spokane River after its initial split, along Spokane Falls Boulevard, and contains several of the park's features including the Looff Carrousel, Numerica Skate Ribbon, and Rotary Fountain. The area also serves as the South Gateway to Riverfront Park. Unofficial extensions of this area of the park came as a result of the linking of Riverfront Park to Huntington Park via a plaza between Spokane City Hall and the Post Street Electric Substation and a combined sewer overflow project featuring a 2,200,000 US gallons (8,300,000 L) subterranean storm water tank with a multi-level plaza on top of it above ground, connecting the sidewalk fronting Spokane City Hall with a wide promenade, the A Place of Truths Plaza, that overlooks Huntington Park and reaches the south landing of the Monroe Street Bridge. Moving northward across the South Channel is Havermale Island which encompasses a number of grassy meadows, natural conservation areas, amphitheaters, the U.S. Pavilion, and the Great Northern clock tower. The northern area of Riverfront Park, just across the Spokane Falls from Havermale Island, is generally referred to as the North Bank and contains the park's northern gateway. Up until Riverfront Park's 2021 redevelopment, much of the North Bank area was underdeveloped as a park and primarily used for parking and park maintenance facilities. The North bank redevelopment created features which included an ice age floods themed playground, Hoopfest basketball courts, the Skate and Wheels Park, and a climbing boulder as well as the Howard Street Promenade which showcases ample views of the Spokane falls and other water features of the Spokane River. Overlooking and adjacent to the north bank playground is The Podium, a multi-use sportsplex with a seating capacity of 3,000 constructed in 2021.

=== Urban context and connectivity ===
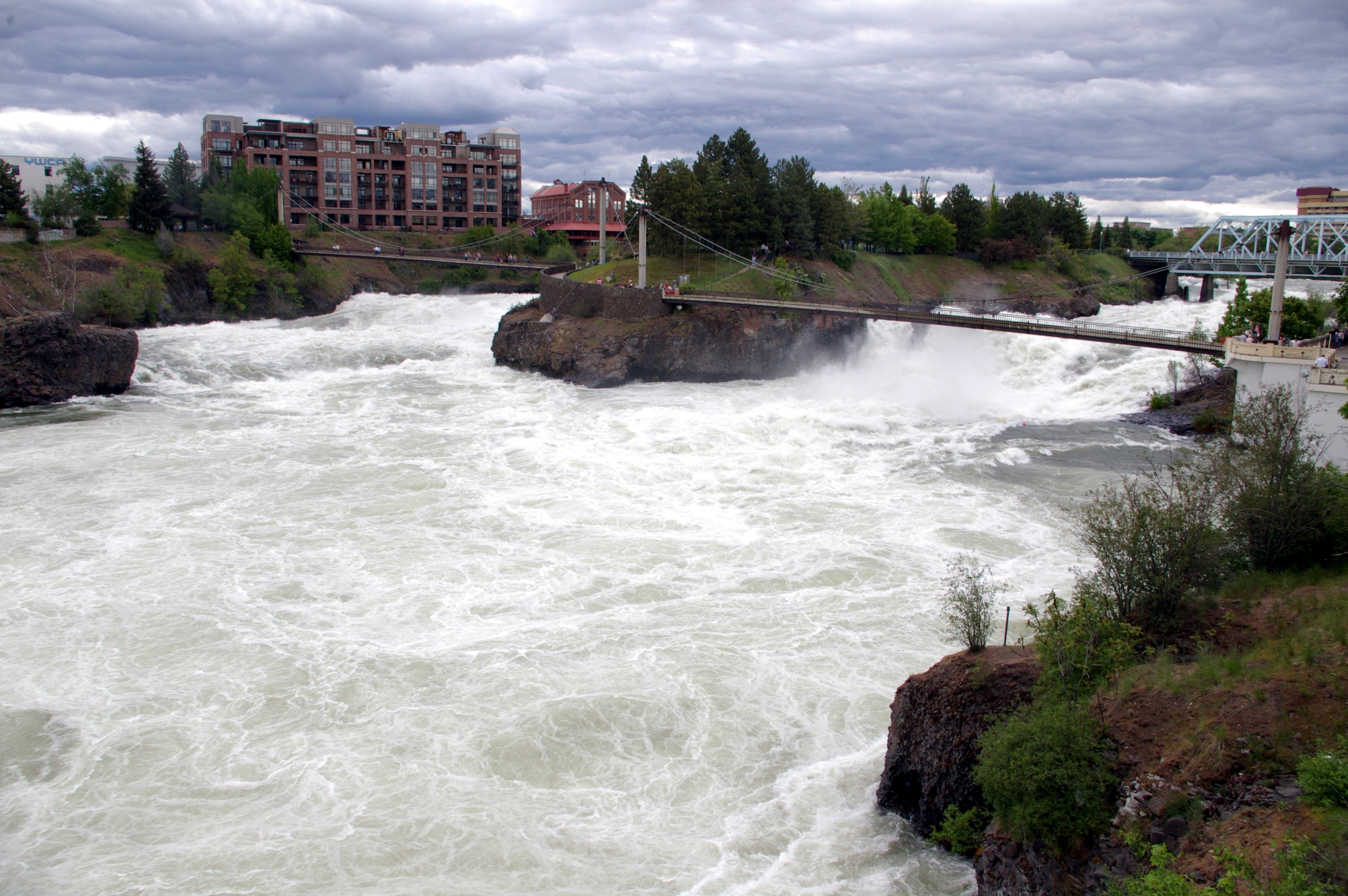
One of the many pedestrian footbridges that cross the Spokane River and provide up-close viewing of the Spokane Falls.

Riverfront Park's location in downtown Spokane creates a highly urban context for the park. The park's southern boundary of Spokane Falls Boulevard along the downtown core creates a distinct urban streetwall, or park-city edge, similar to edges that exist in other urban parks such as Grant and Millennium Parks in Chicago, the National Mall in Washington, D.C., and Central Park in New York City. Zoning regulations along this southern edge have been debated, pitting developers' concerns that height restrictions are hindering development against concerns that increased building heights along Spokane Falls Boulevard would cast undesirable shadows onto the park below.

The park is also well connected to the urban areas and destinations that surround all sides. The park's southern and western boundaries consist entirely of roadways, which are lined with sidewalks that open directly onto adjacent plazas and lawns within Riverfront Park. Further east, the First Interstate Center for the Arts, and Spokane Convention Center physically occupy a large amount of the park's frontage, but, access between downtown and the park, and even access from the buildings themselves, is integrated into the architectural design of those facilities through large breezeways, terraces and door openings. Along the northern boundary of the park, the natural topography of the Spokane River's banks, combined with private development that lines much of that side of the river, makes access slightly more limited. Despite this, access points to the park are still frequently available through trails that parallel the river and intersect with roadways and connect with the parking lots of these private developments along the way.

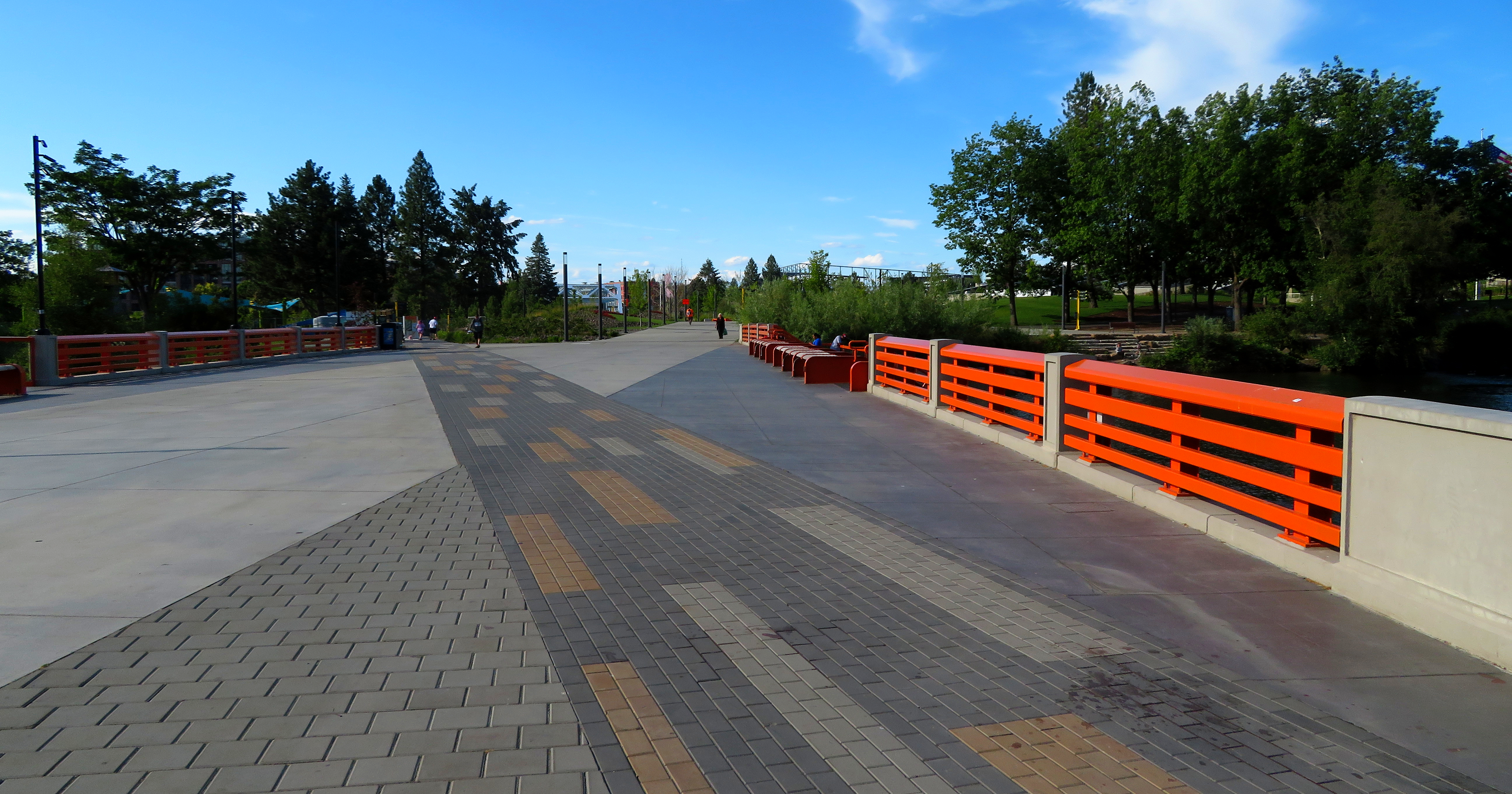
The Howard Street promenade was built to provide a straight route across the park

A number of paths and roadways also traverse the park, providing further connectivity to surrounding areas beyond. In the north—south direction, the Howard Street Promenade provides a direct link between the core of downtown Spokane and the North Bank areas of downtown. The promenade runs from the Rotary Fountain on the park's southern boundary, across snxw meneɂ, and ends at the park's northern entrance across the street from the Spokane Veterans Memorial Arena. Prior to the completion of the promenade, it was still possible to pass through the park in a north—south manner, but the route was much more meandering and circuitous and did not offer a direct link (neither physically or visually) between the two ends of the park. Other major north—south paths through the park include pedestrian suspension bridges over the Upper Spokane Falls toward the west end of the park, pedestrian bridges near the east end that connect the First Interstate Center for the Arts with a hotel on the north bank of the river, and the Washington Street Bridge which carries cars and pedestrians through the center of the park.

==== Spokane River Centennial Trail ====
From the east, the Spokane River Centennial Trail, a 37-mile (60 km) National Recreation Trail that is a continuation of the North Idaho Centennial Trail in Idaho, meanders through from the adjacent University District and WSU Health Sciences Spokane campus, entering Riverfront Park from underneath the Division Street Bridge as it travels to its western terminus in Sontag Park near the Nine Mile Dam. As it meanders westward through the park, it passes by many of the park's features including the Spokane Convention Center, First Interstate Center for the Arts, Red Wagon, Looff Carrousel, Rotary Fountain, and the Numerica SkyRide and Skate Ribbon. The trail exits the west end of the park via the Post Street Bridge, continuing on underneath the Monroe Street Bridge toward Kendall Yards, and eventually, Riverside State Park.

== History ==
=== Site history ===
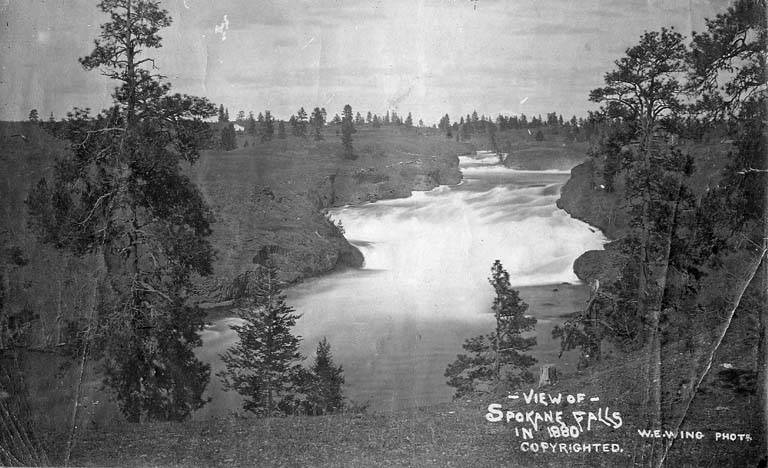
Spokane Falls, 1880.

The origins of Riverfront Park are heavily influenced by the initial settling of the city of Spokane on the Spokane Falls along the Spokane River, which was chosen because of the falls' hydropower potential to support a late 19th century city and its economy, and the eventual reaction to the immense amount of industrial and railroad development that engulfed and obscured the area around the falls as Spokane expanded over the ensuing decades.

The site of the park and the surrounding falls were originally inhabited by Native Americans, who had a number of fishing camps near the base of the falls. Regional tribes would convene at this bountiful fishery during the annual Chinook salmon run to fish, trade, and engage in cultural activities. Along the falls, the salmon would be caught using various fish trap methods and the catch would be dried and smoked on site to preserve and store them for sustenance during the sparse winter months. Among the gathering tribes, a "Salmon Chief" is chosen to coordinate fishing efforts, hold prayer, lead singing ceremonies, and bless and distribute the catch equitably to the tribes.

American settlers first occupied the site in 1871 when a claim was established at Spokane Falls. In 1873, James N. Glover, who would go on to become influential in the initial birth and growth of Spokane and is considered one of its founders, passed through the region with his business partner Jasper N. Matheney. The two, who recognized the value of the Spokane River and its falls for the purpose of water power and were also aware that the Northern Pacific Railroad Company had received a government charter to build a main line through the area (a line that would eventually become the Northern Transcon route), proceeded to buy the claims of 160 acres (65 ha) along with the sawmill from the original settlers.

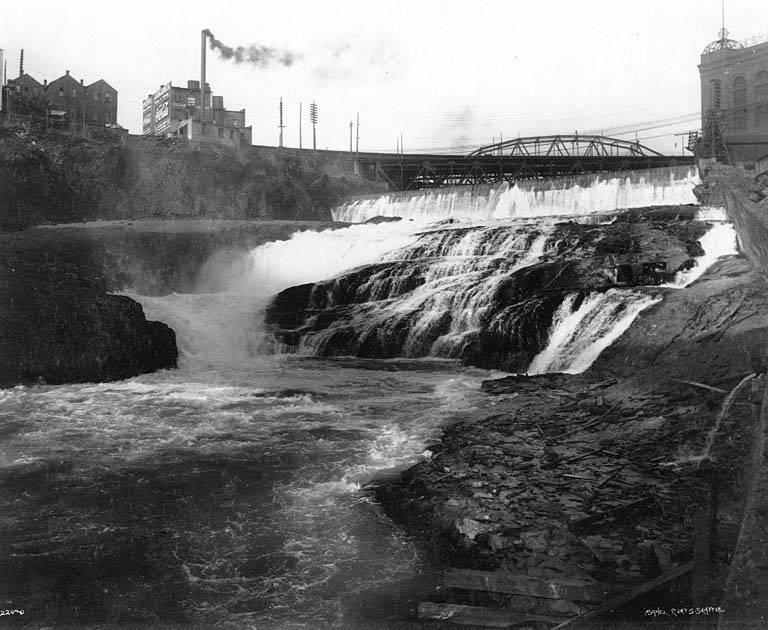
Industrial development along the Spokane Falls in the early 1900s

By the late 19th century, much of the area along the Spokane Falls had become industrialized with sawmills, flour mills, and hydroelectricity generators. Several residences also began to occupy Havermale Island in the heart of what is now Riverfront Park, but, they were forced to relocate when the Great Northern Railway began to build tracks into downtown Spokane in 1892. This neighborhood included a laundromat, city hall, the city fire department and city jail; the 1900 census recorded 317 residents living in the area, 73 of which were prisoners in the city jail and a relatively large proportion of the area were former Chinese railroad laborers that lived in Spokane's Chinatown, the northern edge of which was located on Front Avenue (Spokane Falls Boulevard today) between Howard and Washington Street along the south bank of the Spokane River. In 1902, with the completion of the Great Northern Railway Depot on Havermale Island, trains began running to the city's center and began an era in which railroads would dominate the landscape in downtown Spokane.

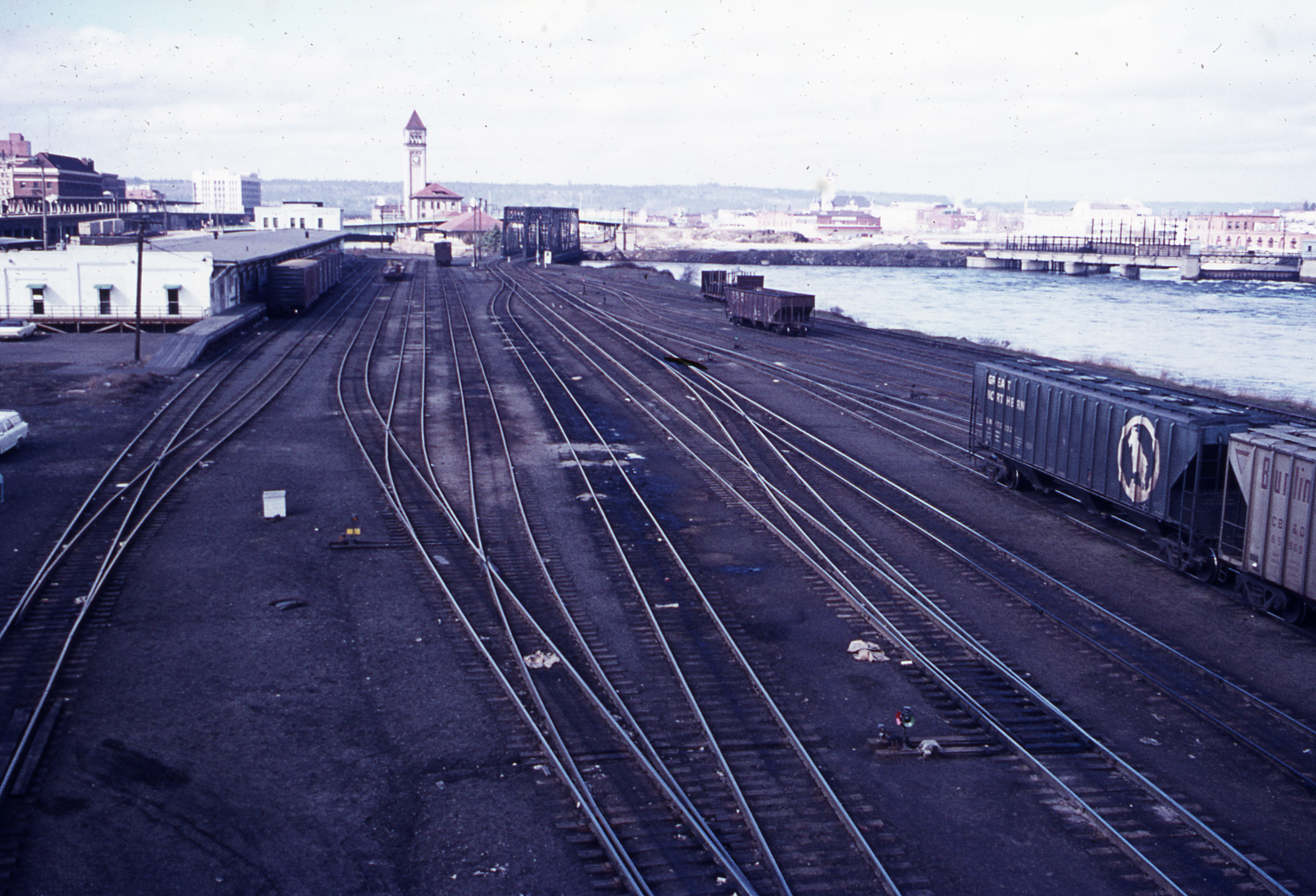
The site of Riverfront Park, as seen in 1972, was a former railyard.

As Spokane continued to grow in the early 20th century, railroading became a major part of Spokane's development and heritage, which led the city to become one of the most important rail centers in the western United States. Spokane eventually became the site of four transcontinental railroads, including the Great Northern, Northern Pacific, Union Pacific, Chicago, Milwaukee, St. Paul and Pacific Railroad, as well as regional ones like the Oregon Railway. The presence of railroads within the downtown core was noted by the Olmsted Brothers in 1908 when they began to develop a master plan for parks in the City of Spokane. As the brothers were planning in the Spokane River Gorge, they skipped the area that Riverfront Park now sits on, sarcastically noting that it had already been partially "improved" and hoped that the City of Spokane would one day acquire the area surrounding the Spokane Falls for a public park.

By 1914, the Union Pacific had built their own station on the park's site, along with elevated tracks leading up to it. The heart of downtown Spokane became a hub for passenger and freight rail transport and remained that way for several decades. By the mid-20th century, the problems of having a large amount of railroads in the middle of the city were beginning to be realized. The elevated railway, warehouses, and other lines leading into the park severely restricted both physical and visual access to the Spokane River and its falls, leading some locals to compare it to the Great Wall of China. Additionally, the high volume of train traffic created a very noisy downtown, and numerous at-grade railroad crossings were causing traffic congestion issues.

=== Urban renewal, reclaiming the riverfront, Expo '74, and park creation ===
In the 1950s, the core of downtown Spokane began to empty out due to suburbanization, a trend that was prevalent amongst many American cities during this time. This trend sparked urban renewal discussions in Spokane and in 1959, a group called Spokane Unlimited was formed by local business leaders to try and revitalize downtown Spokane. The group would hire New York-based Ebasco Services to create an urban renewal plan, which was released in 1961 and called for the removal of the numerous train tracks and trestles in downtown and reclaiming the attractiveness of the Spokane River in the central business district.

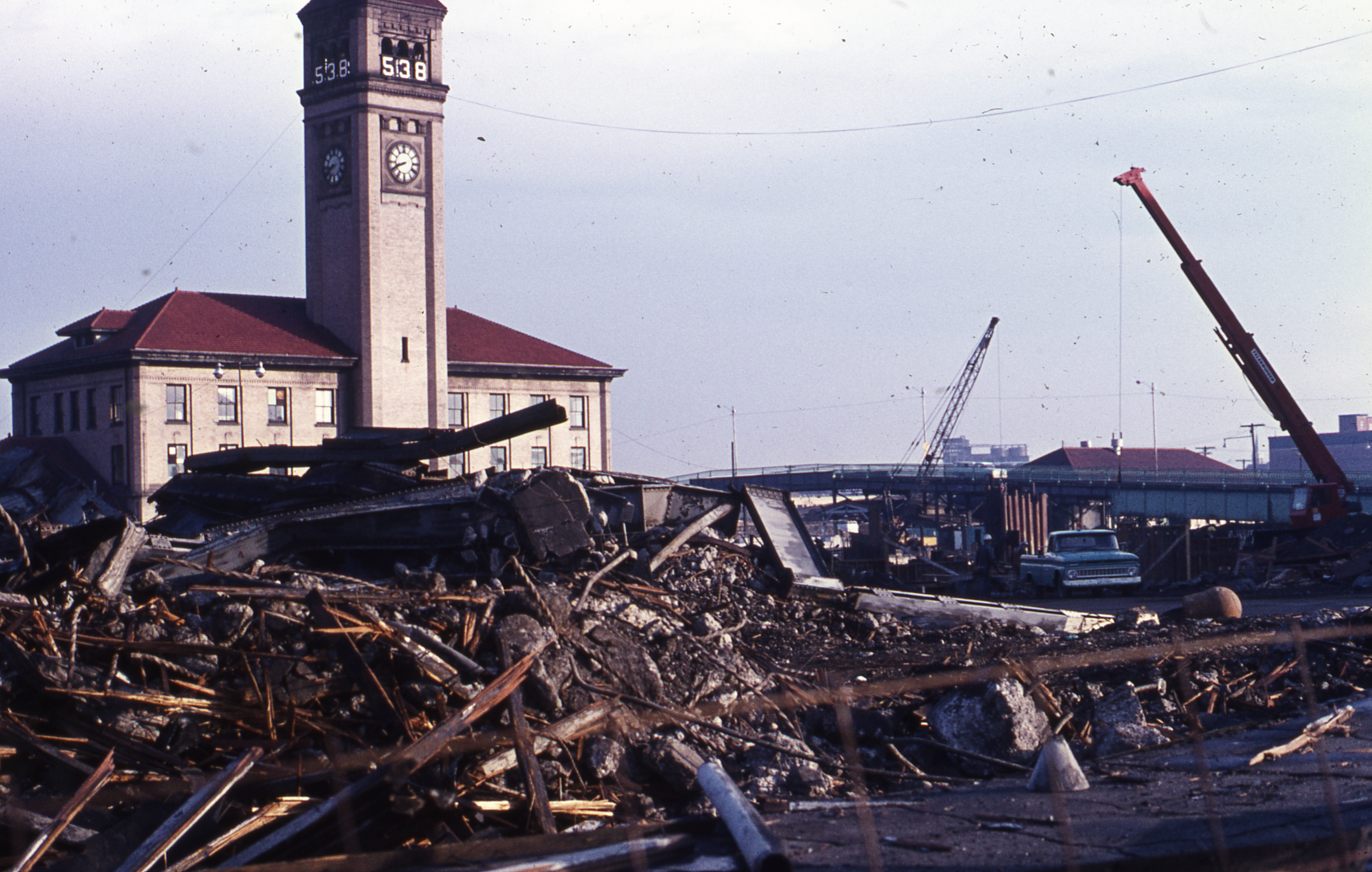
Construction on the Expo '74 site began in 1972 with the removal of existing rail lines and trestles. The "538" on the clock tower was a count down of days until Expo.

The plan proposed a timeline that would incrementally renew the area over the next two decades, wrapping up in 1980, and proposed that the effort be funded through bonds, gas taxes, and urban renewal money from the federal government. One part of the plan, and the first portion to go to voters for approval, would have constructed a new government center. However, efforts to pass bonds to fund the construction were overwhelmingly defeated by Spokane voters over the next couple of years, and by 1963, Spokane Unlimited had to revise its vision. They hired King Cole, who had recently worked on some urban renewal projects in California, to execute Ebasco's urban renewal plans in Spokane. In light of the failed votes, Cole formed a grassroots citizen group, called the Associations for a Better Community (ABC), to build community support through the 1960s around the idea of beautifying the riverfront and turning Havermale Island into a park.

With support around beautification growing, Spokane Unlimited would go on to commission a feasibility study in 1970 for using a marquee event, proposed to be in 1973 to celebrate the centennial of Spokane, to fund the beautification. However, the report stated that a local event would not have the stature to bring in enough funding for the group's beautification aspirations, and that it needed to go bigger; it suggested that Spokane host an international exposition that could bring in state and federal dollars, as well as tourists from outside Spokane, to fund a riverfront transformation. This idea caught on and inquiries were made to the Bureau of International Expositions and an additional study was commissioned in the fall of 1970, and the results both came back very positive. The 1974 world expo was identified as the target event.

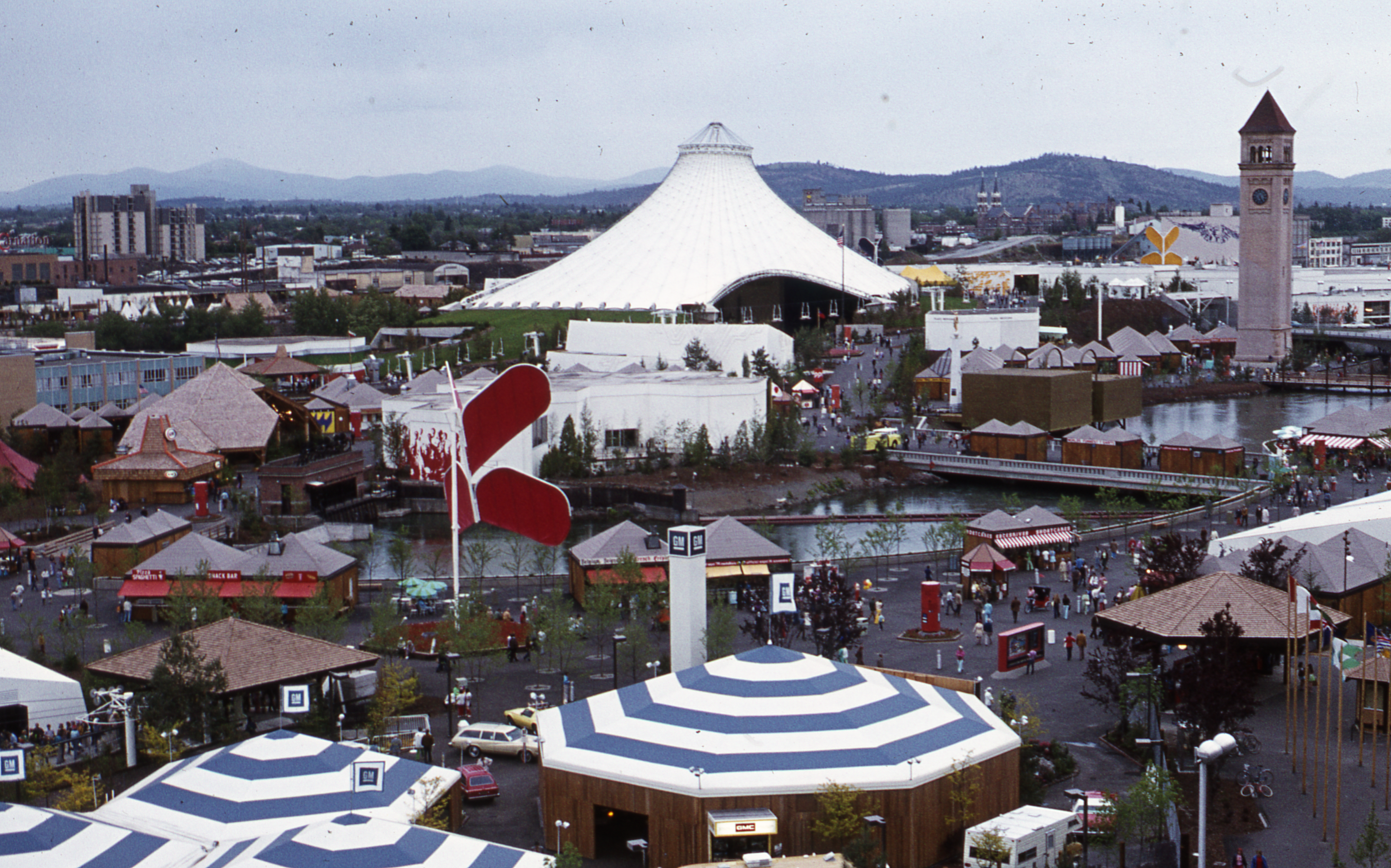
Aerial of the Expo '74 site during the fair. The site later became Riverfront Park.

Efforts to host the expo just three-and-a-half years later began immediately and was a tall order considering that Spokane would become the smallest city at the time to ever host a World's fair, and that the proposed site had 16 owners, including the railroads. Funding came from local, state, and federal sources, including a new business and occupation tax that the Spokane City Council passed in September 1971 after a ballot bond measure to provide local funding failed the month prior. The event was officially recognized by then-President Richard Nixon in October 1971, and the following month, the Bureau of International Expositions gave their sign-off on the event as well.

With approvals and funding falling in place, one last challenge was transforming the site and removing the railroads. Through intense negotiations, the Expo '74 planners, including King Cole were able to convince the railroads to agree to a land swap and donate the land needed for the Expo site. The railroads were consolidated onto the Northern Pacific Railway lines further to the south in downtown Spokane, freeing up the site for construction to transform it to host the environmentally-themed Expo '74. Demolition began in 1972, and the fair was held from May to November 1974, welcoming nearly 5.6 million attendees.

After the world's fair concluded, the site was converted into Riverfront Park by landscape architecture firm Robert Perron and Associates. Perron sought to accentuate the site's natural features such as the upper and lower falls by utilizing observation points that were previously occupied by industrial buildings and warehouses, train tracks, and parking lots. Flowing footpaths connect the various sites and follow the terraformed landscape, revealing elements and viewpoints around the edges of the park, at the center of which is a natural amphitheater. The more developed southern edge of the park adjacent to the downtown central business district features the more artificial and manicured elements of the park, such as green spaces, fountains, and pools while the northern edge retains a more rugged aesthetic that more closely resembles the appearance of the natural environment. The park was dedicated in 1978 by President Jimmy Carter in a ceremony on May 5 that was attended by roughly 50,000 people.

=== 2016–2021 redevelopment ===
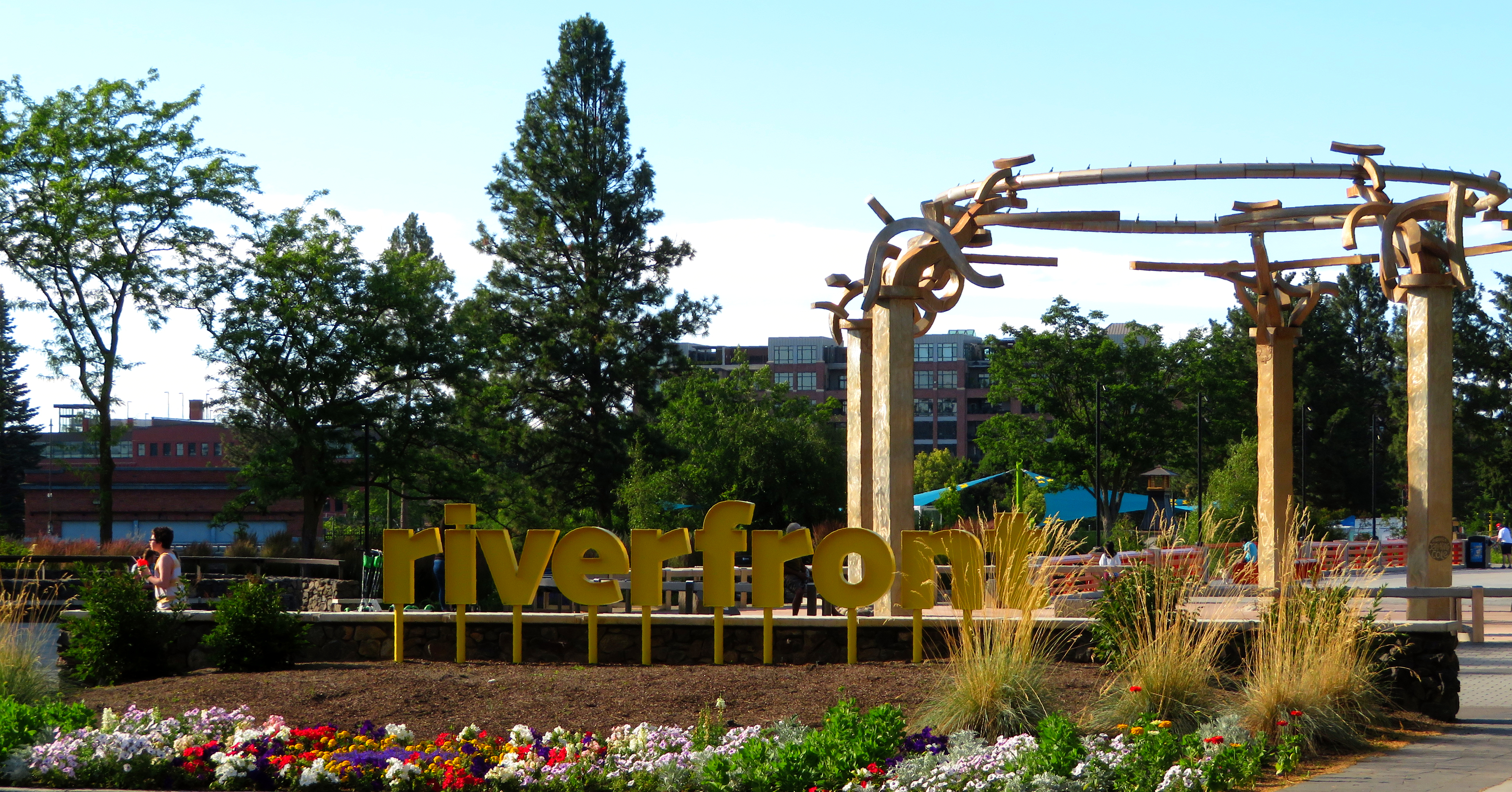
New signage and landscaping at the main Howard Street southern entrance

Riverfront Park had remained largely unchanged and had not seen any major investments since its conversion to a park after Expo '74 and many of its physical facilities were beginning to show their age and disrepair. In 2012, with a vision to reinvigorate Riverfront Park for the next generation, the Spokane Park Board approved the beginnings of an updated master plan for the park. This first phase of the new master plan would outline general concepts only, but in June 2013, details and estimated costs began to be developed by a 20-member advisory committee. Aspirations for the park's future included using it as a key fixture in downtown Spokane to draw more people to the center of the city, boosting the number of events in the park, creating sustainable revenue, increasing viewing opportunities to the Spokane River, and also protecting natural resources and habitat around the park.

The new master plan was completed by early summer 2014, and put toward the Spokane City Council for adoption that summer with the goal of putting it on the general election ballot for a public vote later that year. In November 2014, Spokane voters passed a $64.3 million bond to redevelop Riverfront Park. The bond measure was approved by 67 percent of votes, having the required 60 percent to pass. Passage of the bond measure, called Proposition No. 2 did not raise taxes on citizens as it effectively replaced another parks special property tax that was set to expire. The new bonds raised to pay for the park's redevelopment are set to mature in 2035. Key projects of the bond measure included a renovation of the U.S. Pavilion, construction of a new skate ribbon to replace the former Ice Palace that was hosted each winter at the Pavilion, construction of a new building to house the historic Looff Carousel, and the construction of new public spaces such as the Howard Street Promenade and a regional playground. The advisory committee hired Olson Kundig Architects to conceptualize the design of the new structures and grounds within the framework of the master plan and with input from stakeholders. One of the principal architects of the firm, Tom Kundig, was raised in Spokane and is the son of architect Moritz Kundig, who had a leading role in the design of the same grounds to prepare for Expo '74; the new additions to the park pay homage to the fairs' environmental theme.

Construction on the phased, five-year long project began in 2016 with a ground breaking ceremony on July 8 at the site of the future Numerica Skate Ribbon and the final major phase of construction associated with the park, the north bank playground was completed and opened to the public in May 2021. Another city project adjacent to the park, The Podium sportsplex, along the park's northern boundary was also completed in 2021. The Post Street Bridge that form's the park's western boundary was renovated and enhanced, re-opening for traffic in June 2024.

== Features and attractions ==
=== Natural attractions and open space ===
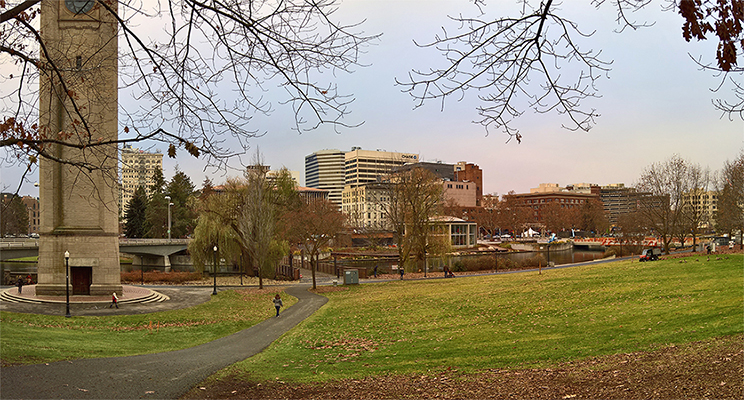
The Clock Tower Meadow is one of many open space grassy meadows that exist throughout Riverfront Park.

The Spokane River and Spokane Falls are the main natural attraction of Riverfront Park and are visible from many areas of the park. Along the river's calm south channel, many of the walking paths and lawns go right up to the river's edge, allowing park-goers to get close to the water. People have been known to stick their feet in the water and fish in the south channel from time to time. Access and visibility to the river's north channel, which is home to the falls, is generally more limited due to the faster and rougher water and river gorge that is created by the falls. However, many official viewing points exist, most notably two pedestrian suspension bridges at the west end of snxw meneɂ that provide up-close viewing of the falls.

Riverfront Park features a number of open grassy meadows on the south side of Havermale Island facing the calmer south channel of the Spokane River, including the Lilac Bowl, which is a natural amphitheater, and the Clock Tower Meadow, adjacent to the Great Northern clock tower.

Native flora are also featured in the park to create a markedly more natural environment. The Riverfront Park Conservation Area at the site of the reclaimed land that was occupied by a YMCA building, is approximately 1-acre (0.40 ha) and runs right alongside the falls and highlights a stream that ran underneath the former building site.

In collaboration of the Spokane Humane Society, on June 18, 2022, the Spokane Parks Foundation announced the Spokane Humane Society Paw Park which will be developed across from the Lilac Bowl. The timeline of the project is not yet solidified.

=== Fauna ===
A number of animal species have been spotted in the park, including marmots, osprey, beaver, and mule deer. Some of the more common animals seen at the park are ducks, Canada geese, squirrels and marmots. Marmots are common in and around the river, the park, the Centennial Trail, and other areas around the city, which is unusual outside the region as they typically live in more remote, mountainous locations.

=== Structures and built attractions ===
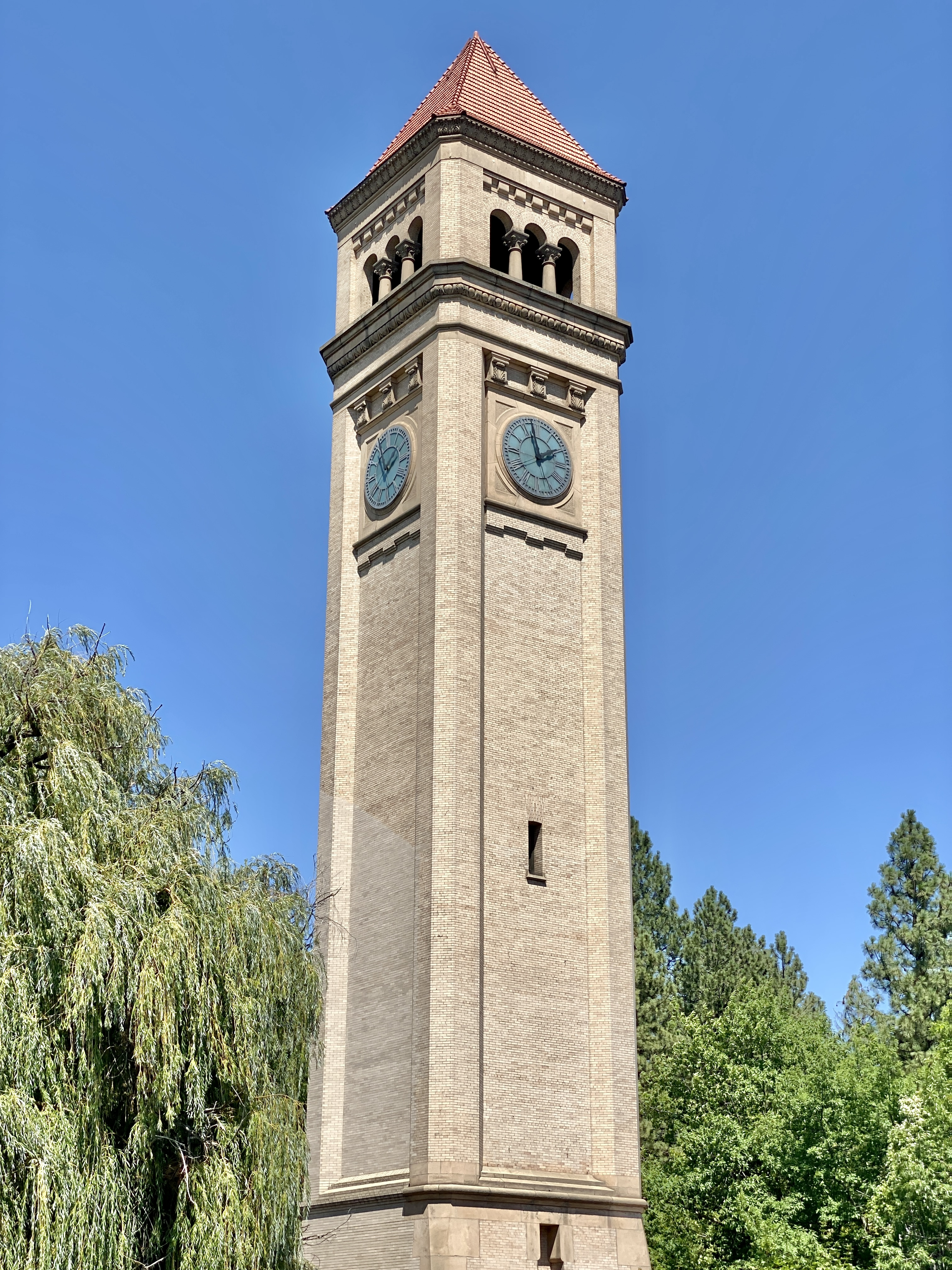
The Great Northern clock tower used to be part of a railway depot before Expo '74. The location of the former depot's roofline can be seen where the brick changes color.

Riverfront Park is also known for its built attractions. Two of Riverfront Park's structures, the U.S. Pavilion and Great Northern clock tower, are a couple of Spokane's most recognizable landmarks and have been featured prominently in the logo of Riverfront Park for a number of years. While prior versions of the park's logos depicted the two landmarks more literally, the park's latest logo, released in 2017, features abstractions of the landmarks' forms. The logo evokes the triangular-shaped form of the pavilion along with its arc-shaped bottom structural component and leaning posture. The thin, rectangular shape and triangular top of the clock tower, along with its round clock faces are also abstracted into the design. Other geometric aspects of the logo are inspired by the cable-work of the Pavilion's structure, Spokane's street grid, and the crossing of many paths.

==== Great Northern Railway clock tower ====
The Great Northern Railway clock tower is located on Havermale Island and was originally constructed in 1902. It was part of the Great Northern Railway Depot that existed on the Riverfront Park site prior to Expo '74. When the rail tracks were removed and site transformed in preparations for Expo, the depot was demolished in 1973, but the clock tower was left standing after a public push to save it and has now become a Spokane icon, reminding people of the role that railroading played in the development of Spokane. This local historic preservation effort was headed by Jerry Quinn, who organized a group that sought to preserve the Great Northern Railway depot in its entirety called "Save Our Stations", although failing in that effort at the ballot box, the committee overseeing the World's Fair site preparation thought something had to be retained to appease the "railroad buffs." The location roofline of the former depot can be seen on the face of the tower where the sandstone masonry blocks change color.

The tower stands at 155 feet (47 m) and 6 inches (150 mm) tall, and features a 9 ft (2.7 m) diameter clock face on all four of its sides. The clock itself is controlled by a solid 700 lb (320 kg) brass pendulum that needs to be hand-cranked every week by park staff. While the clock chimes every hour, it has never had bells in its entire history. Even when it was first built, it had electronic speakers that replicated chime tones.

==== U.S. Pavilion ====
The U.S. Pavilion, officially named the U.S. Federal Pavilion, and also referred to as the Pavilion at Riverfront, or simply the Pavilion, is a steel and cable structure located in the center of Riverfront Park on Havermale Island. The Pavilion, which served as the pavilion for the United States during the event and is one of the legacy pieces of Expo '74, is used as an event center with indoor and outdoor event space, and an amphitheater for concerts and live performances with raised catwalks and viewing platforms. When not in use, the Pavilion functions as open public space, providing views to the Spokane River.

===== History =====
The City of Spokane was extended federal recognition of the environmentally-themed Expo '74 by then-US President Richard Nixon on October 15, 1971. Soon after, the U.S. Department of Commerce issued a proposal for federal participation in the event. It recommended that the president would find the national interest of the United States served by its participation. It stated that the theme of the fair was of great national importance and interest, and that participation would help provide a platform to showcase the country's accomplishments in the environmental field on a world stage. Besides having a platform to increase awareness to the world about the dangers of environmental damage and initiatives taken to counter it, participation in the exposition would also yield economic benefits to the United States, including bringing foreign travelers and giving American manufacturers an opportunity to showcase their anti-pollution equipment that could create new overseas trade opportunities for the United States.

It was proposed that the best way for the United States to participate in the exposition would be through an exhibit to be housed within a pavilion constructed by the United States government. Additionally, in order to ensure a good cost-benefit to the U.S. government, it was recommended that the pavilion be designed to be permanent and remain after the fair for residual use by the Department of the Interior as a component of a civic center and urban park (what is now Riverfront Park) that would be left over as a legacy after Expo '74 concluded. A four-acre plot of land within the Expo '74 site was to be deeded by the City of Spokane to the U.S. Government for the Pavilion. Prior to the transformation of the larger 100-acre Expo site, a Travelodge motel, built in 1959, sat on the land that the U.S. Pavilion now occupies.

To prepare for the design and construction of the Pavilion, the Department of Commerce issued a request for proposal in December 1971 from firms across the country for preliminary design concepts. Twenty firms initially responded to the proposal, of which half were chosen to advance in the competition. Three finalists were eventually named, with Los Angeles-based Herb Rosenthal & Associates being awarded the contract to develop the plan, including schematic concepts and cost estimates. The firm partnered with the Portland, Oregon office of Skidmore, Owings, & Merrill as well as Spokane-based Trogdon-Smith, a firm that would later merge with other firms and eventually become NAC Architecture.

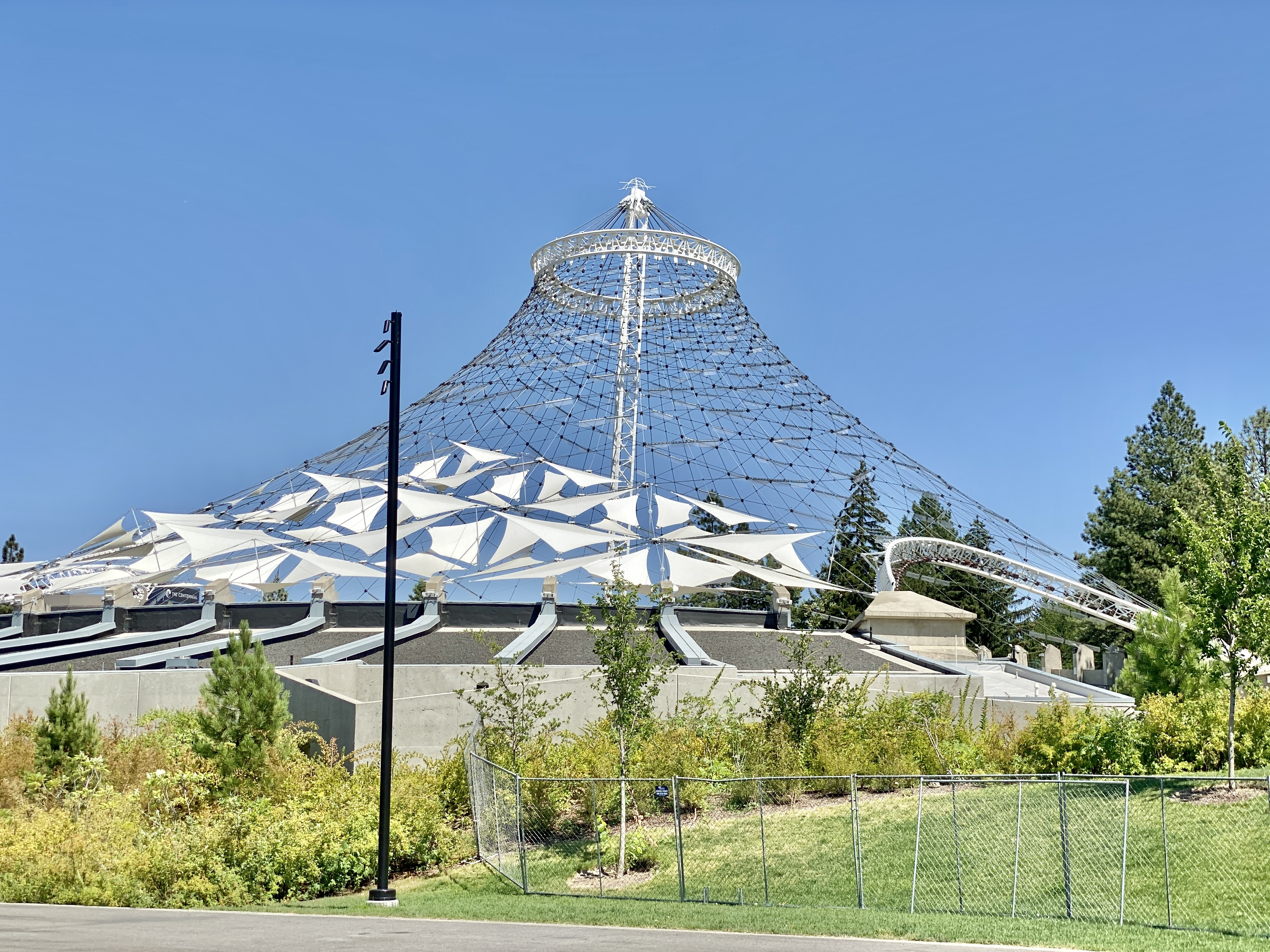
The cable structure of the U.S. Pavilion in 2024.

In January 1973, after unsuccessful negotiations with Skidmore, Owings, & Merrill, who was already on the design team, a contract for the pavilion's final design was awarded to Seattle-based architecture firm Naramore, Bain, Brady & Johanson, now known as NBBJ. The final design differed slightly from the earlier conceptual designs, but still retained a lot of the original elements including soft canopy covering a courtyard, theater, holding area, and permanent building. The Pavilion was formed to look like a giant tent (and was originally covered) as a way to support the fair's environmental theme and was the largest structure at the fair. The design of the pavilion was described by the U. S. Department of Commerce as "an expression of environmental concern...[with the] structure's smooth, graceful contour harmonized fully with the surrounding shoreline terrain." In 1972, the United States Congress provided $11.5 million ($88.5 million in 2025 dollars) to build the pavilion and outfit it with exhibits.

To help ensure a successful construction project and on-time delivery, the construction of the project was managed and administered by the General Services Administration (GSA) rather than the Commerce Department. The Commerce Department was short-staffed and experiencing a heavy workload at the time, and its base in Washington, D.C. was considered too remote to Spokane to run the construction successfully. It subsequently entered an agreement with the GSA, which leveraged its Pacific Northwest connections at the GSA regional office in Auburn, Washington. The GSA's agreement with the Department of Commerce called for the project to utilize a construction management technique, and by mid-December 1972, the GSA began the process of selecting a construction management firm through an invitation-to-bid process, eventually selecting California-based Rhodes-Schmidt as the low bidder. Due to time constraints, the GSA decided to use a phased-bid project delivery method so that as soon as the architects completed a portion of the design, it could be put out to bid for construction. The first construction contract was awarded on April 25, 1973, for earthwork, foundation components, and underground utilities, and a groundbreaking ceremony was held just six days later on May 1, 1973 in a ceremony attended by a number of distinguished guests including local, federal, and Expo '74 officials, and foreign dignitaries representing nations such as the Soviet Union.

The Pavilion's tower stands 150 feet (46 m) tall, and the structure contains roughly 4.6 miles (7.4 km) of cabling. As part of its original design, the Pavilion featured a vinyl covering that was installed in 1973. The covering, which cost $1 million and weighed 12 tons, was not meant to last, and was removed in early 1979. The Pavilion has had its iconic skeleton-look with exposed cabling ever since.

===== Renovation =====
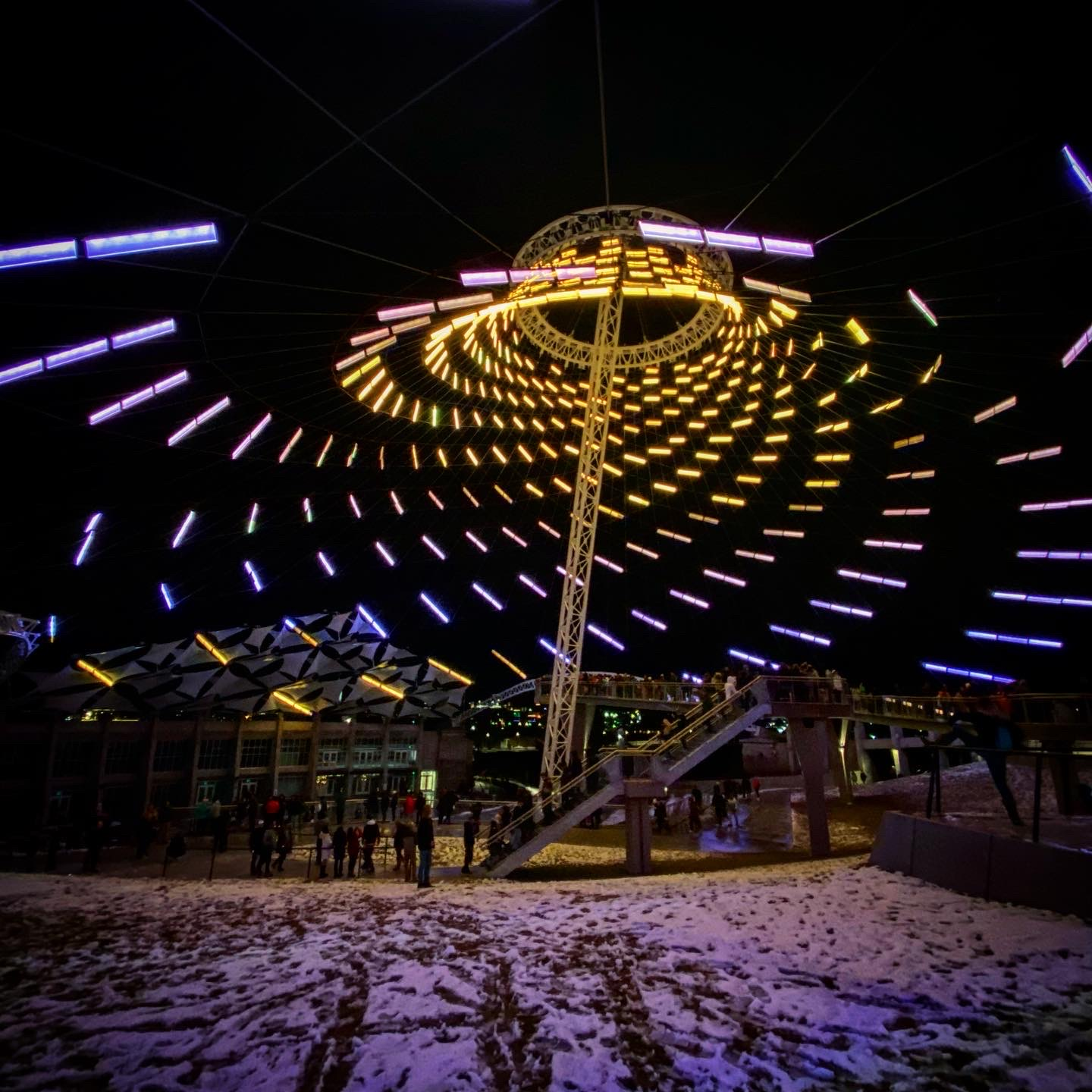
The U.S. Pavilion on New Year's Eve 2019 featuring the new light blades.

The Pavilion underwent a full renovation in 2018 as part of Riverfront Park's redevelopment. As part of the project, the IMAX theater was removed along with a number of other structures that had been added to the pavilion since its original construction. The renovated pavilion reopened on September 6, 2019, and features an open floorspace for events and sloped and terraced landscaping to provide seating areas for audiences. One "indoor space" from the pavilion before redevelopment remains incorporated into the redesign to be used as a ticketed entry point when needed, and also features rental space and park offices. Additionally a 40 ft (12 m) high platform was constructed in its center to provide views of the Spokane River. There was debate about recovering the pavilion's structure like it was during Expo '74, but concerns about budget and schedule made it unfeasible. Instead, several dozen panels mounted on the west side of the cable structure create shade for portions of the renovated pavilion's floor and seating areas.

The redesign also added plexiglass "blades" illuminated by LEDs to the cables that make up the Pavilion. The redesign team wanted to highlight the Pavilion at night in a way that would incorporate and enhance the unique look of the net-like canopy. There are 476 blades that measure 3 ft (0.91 m), 4 ft (1.2 m), and 6 ft (1.8 m) in length but are controllable in 6 in (150 mm) segments. The U.S. Pavilion displays animated light shows from Dusk-10pm on Fridays, Saturdays, and Sundays and specialized light shows or static looks created for holidays and special events. In August 2020, the lighting design for the Pavilion won awards for Outdoor Lighting Design and Control Innovation from the Illuminating Engineering Society.

==== Looff Carrousel ====
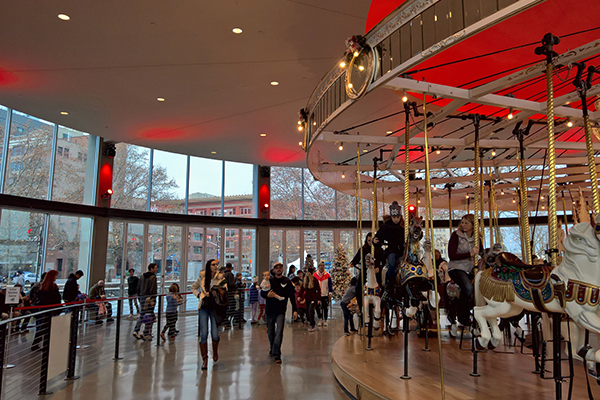
The Looff Carousel features hand-carved animals and has operated in Spokane for over 100 years.

Riverfront Park is home to one of the many hand-carved carousels built by prominent late 19th and early 20th century carousel builder, Charles I. D. Looff, who is notable for building the first carousel at Coney Island and one of the piers that make up the Santa Monica Pier. Spokane's carousel, which was added to the National Register of Historic Places in 1977, and still operates for riders today, was built in 1909 as a wedding gift from Looff to his daughter Emma and her husband Louis Vogel. The ride was first installed in nearby Natatorium Park, and operated there until the park's closure in 1968. When Expo '74 came, organizers originally wanted to bring the carousel out of storage and showcase it to the world during the event, but it was deemed impractical due to the restoration and moving costs. It would not be until 1975, after the conclusion of Expo '74, that the ride would be installed on the expo's legacy site that is now Riverfront Park. The building that housed the German Hofbrau during the world's fair became the new home for the carousel, and it operated in there until 2016 when the ride temporarily closed for Riverfront Park's redevelopment.

During the redevelopment, the carousel was stored and refurbished while the former German Hofbrau building that housed it was demolished and replaced. A new building was constructed in its place on the same site and opened on May 12, 2018.

==== Red Wagon ====
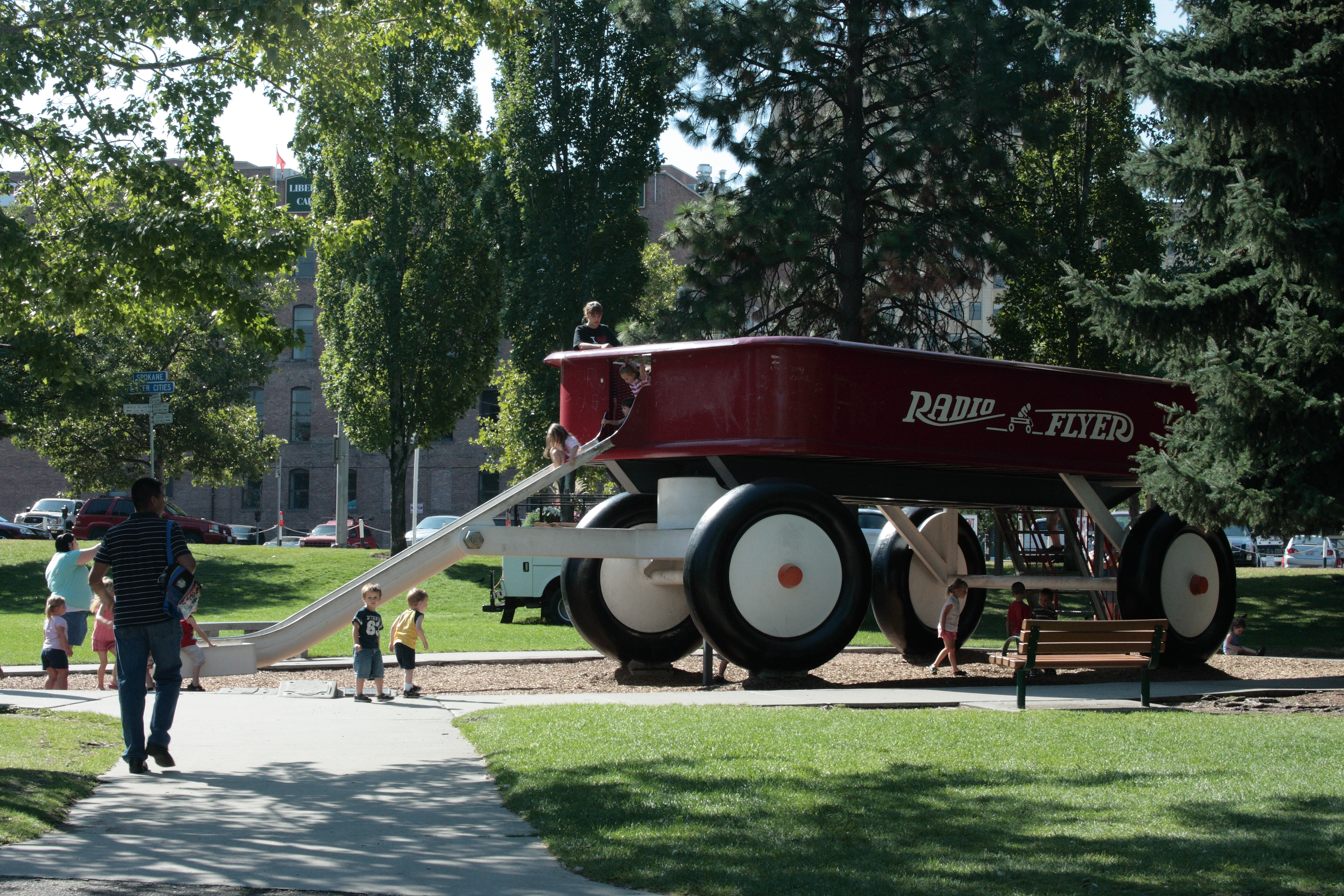
The Childhood Express.

The Red Wagon, officially named The Childhood Express, is a play sculpture that is modeled after a Radio Flyer wagon. The Red Wagon is located along Spokane Falls Boulevard on Riverfront Park's southern boundary, between the First Interstate Center for the Arts and the Looff Carousel, and diagonally across from the Davenport Grand Hotel. Created by local sculptor, Ken Spiering, the feature stands 12 feet (3.7 m) high, spans 27 feet (8.2 m) long, and weighs 26 tons from its steel and concrete structure. The sculpture was commissioned by the Junior League with donations from its Spokane chapter and other local business for Washington State's Centennial celebration (the state achieved statehood in 1889) and was dedicated to Spokane's children on August 18, 1990.

Users can enter and exit the wagon through a staircase located at the underside of its rear end, taking them up to a wooden platform "within" the wagon. The platform covers the entire extent of the wagon, allowing users to walk right up to the edge of the wagon where its "walls" double as guardrails. At the front end, the wagon's handle doubles as a playground slide, providing another way for users to exit and interact with the sculpture. In May 2022, The Red Wagon received significant repairs for the first time in the 33 years since its construction, and a fresh coat of paint.

==== Numerica SkyRide ====
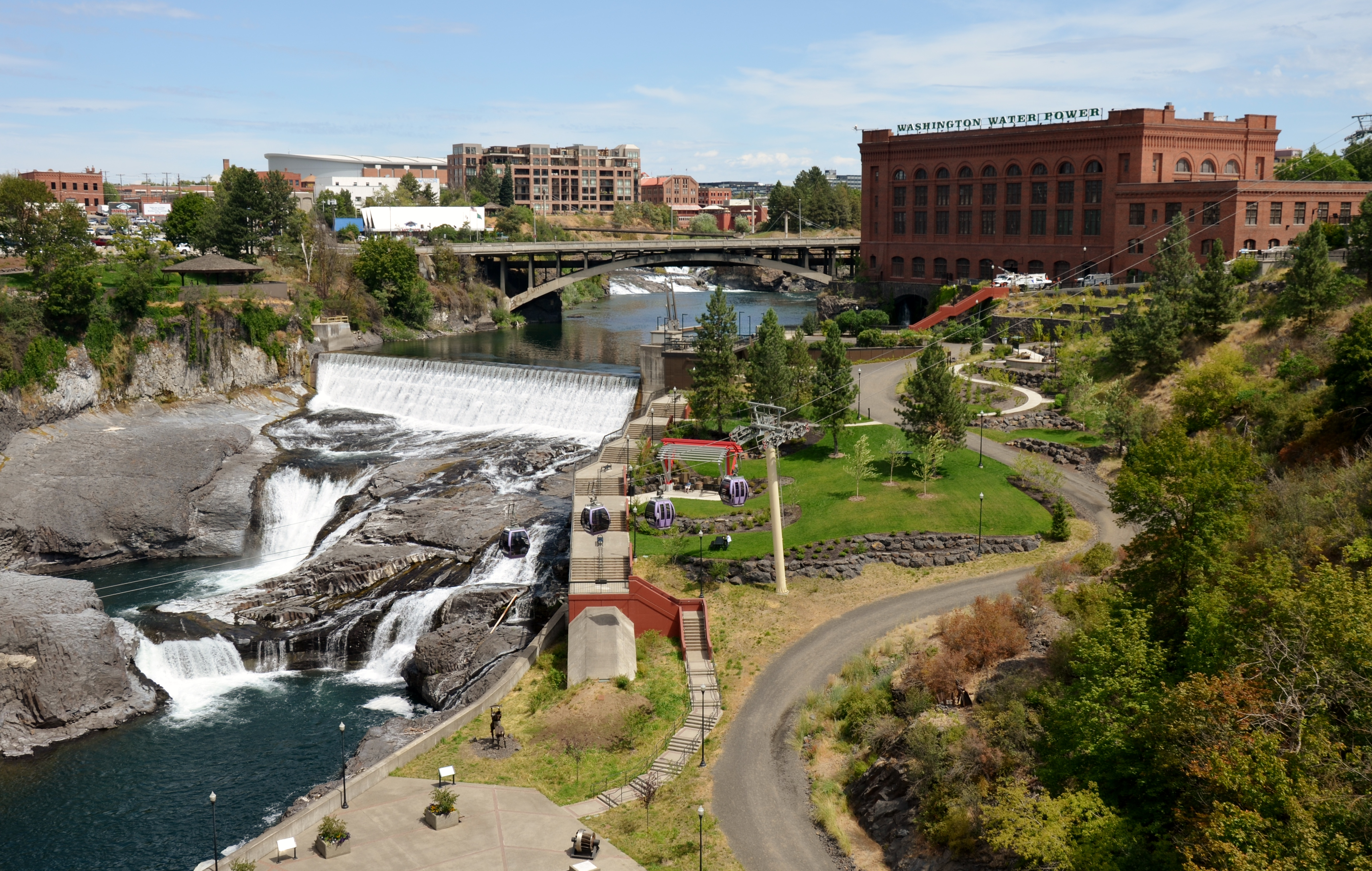
A view of the SkyRide as it passes over Huntington Park.

The Numerica SkyRide is a gondola lift ride located at the southeast corner of Riverfront Park that takes people westward from the park, past Spokane City Hall and over Huntington Park, descending down into the Spokane River gorge to view the Lower Spokane Falls. The ride then crosses the river and makes a loop back toward Riverfront Park after passing beneath the Monroe Street Bridge.

The current iteration of the ride was constructed in 2005 by the Doppelmayr Garaventa Group. The original version of the SkyRide was built in the 1960s by the Riblet Tramway Company and purchased by the City of Spokane secondhand for Expo '74. The ride had two routes at Expo, one over the exposition's fairgrounds, and the other descending down the Spokane River Gorge to view the Spokane Falls. The fairgrounds route was removed after the conclusion of Expo, but the Falls route was retained. The original ride had open-air gondolas, which served until the ride's reconstruction in 2005, which rebuilt the attraction and upgraded it with fully enclosed gondolas as part of a $2.5 million project. Refurbishment to the original ride was considered, but ultimately the decision was made to replace the entire system and its parts.

The naming rights to the ride were acquired in February 2019 by Numerica Credit Union for a ten-year term along with the adjacent Numerica Skate Ribbon.

==== Numerica Skate Ribbon ====
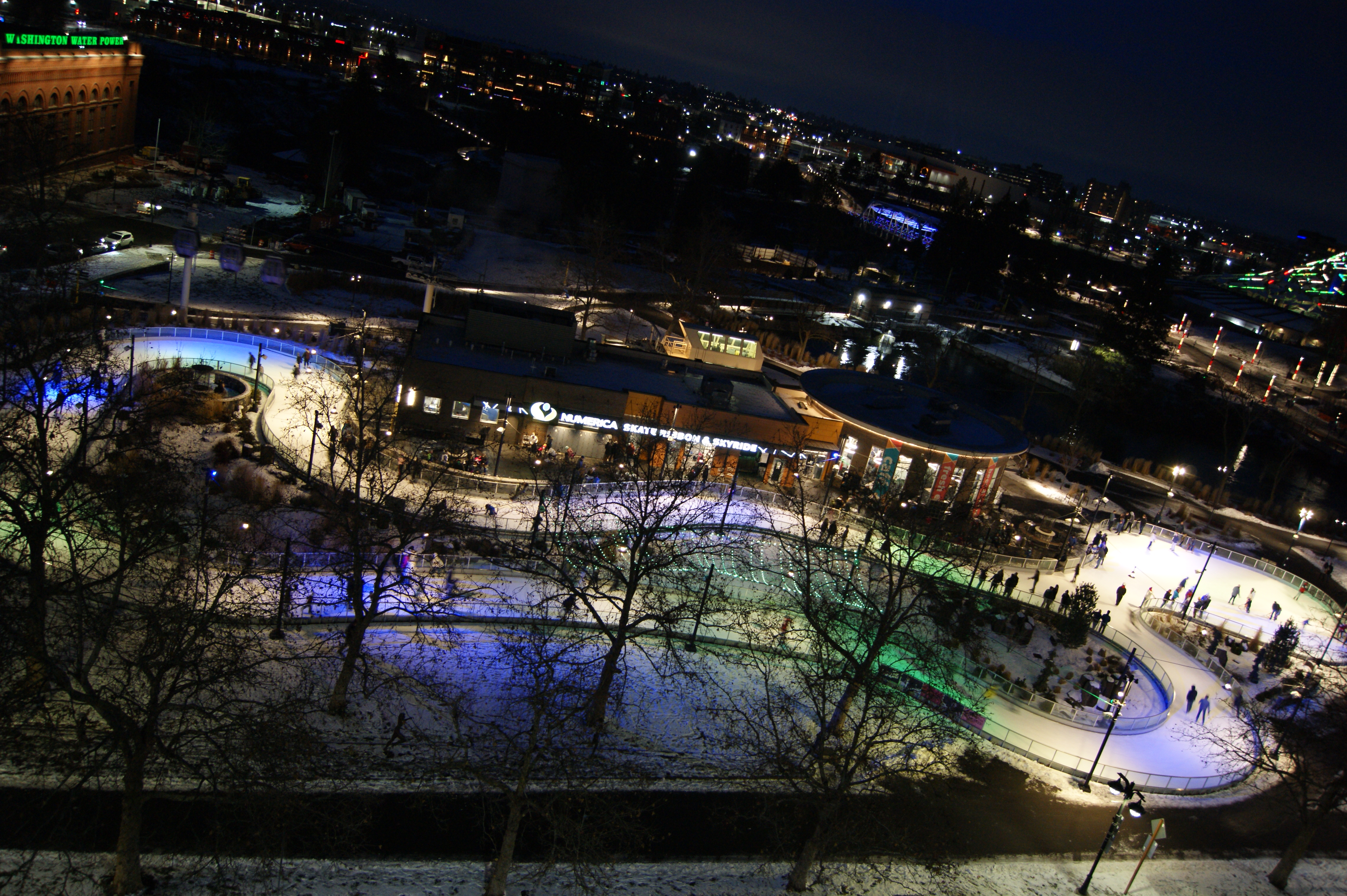
The Numerica Skate Ribbon and SkyRide in December 2021.

The Numerica Skate Ribbon, originally known as the Riverfront Skate Ribbon, opened in 2017 as part of Riverfront Park's redevelopment. The venue is located at the southwest corner of the park, across from River Park Square and Spokane City Hall. The ribbon primarily serves as a year-round skating venue, with hard surface skating accommodated in the warmer months and ice skating offered in the winter months. The facility also has a café and hosts other events throughout the year on its concrete surface, such as art walks, beer gardens, weddings, and other events.

The ribbon was constructed to replace the seasonal Ice Palace ice skating rink that Riverfront Park set up annually under the U.S. Pavilion. During its planning and design stages, the design and format of the ribbon, which features a 715-foot (218 m) meandering and sloped path as well as an ice pond, drew criticism from certain user groups for its contrast to the flat and open ice rink format of the former Ice Palace. The new format meant that the ribbon would no longer be able to accommodate hockey players and ice skating instructors with large classes for the same purposes as before.

In February 2019, Numerica Credit Union acquired the naming rights for the Skate Ribbon along with the adjacent SkyRide. The $90,000 a year deal runs through early 2029, with an option to extend another 10 years. The revenue will be used to support programming and maintenance at the park.

==== Sister Cities Connections Garden ====
A sculpture garden and plaza northwest of the Howard Street footbridge was unveiled in September 2019 that features sculptures that pay homage to Spokane's five sister cities of Nishinomiya, Jilin, Jecheon, Limerick, and Cagli as well as Spokane itself. The garden includes a sculpture of a golden harp encased in glass for Limerick, an 11 ft (3.4 m) tall replica of the Imazu Lighthouse for Nishinomiya and a 5 ft (1.5 m) fish sculpture which honors the city of Spokane and the Native American tribes. Sculptures for the other sister cities will be designed and installed in the future.

==== Providence Playspace ====
The Providence Playspace is a Shane's Inspiration playground that was opened in October 2020 on the park's south end near the Upper Falls Power Plant. The project is not part of Riverfront Park's redevelopment bond, rather, it was funded by donors, including a $1 million donation from Providence Health & Services. Shane's Inspiration focuses on designing playgrounds that are all-inclusive and accessible to all children, including those with physical or developmental disabilities, and Riverfront Park's playground will be the first of its kind in Spokane. The playground totals 11,600 sq ft (1,080 m^{2}) and includes 20 different kinds of play pieces, including a sand box table for a hands-on tactile experience, a "cozy dome" quiet space, and several music making pieces.

==== Ice Age Floods Playground and Skate and Wheels Park ====
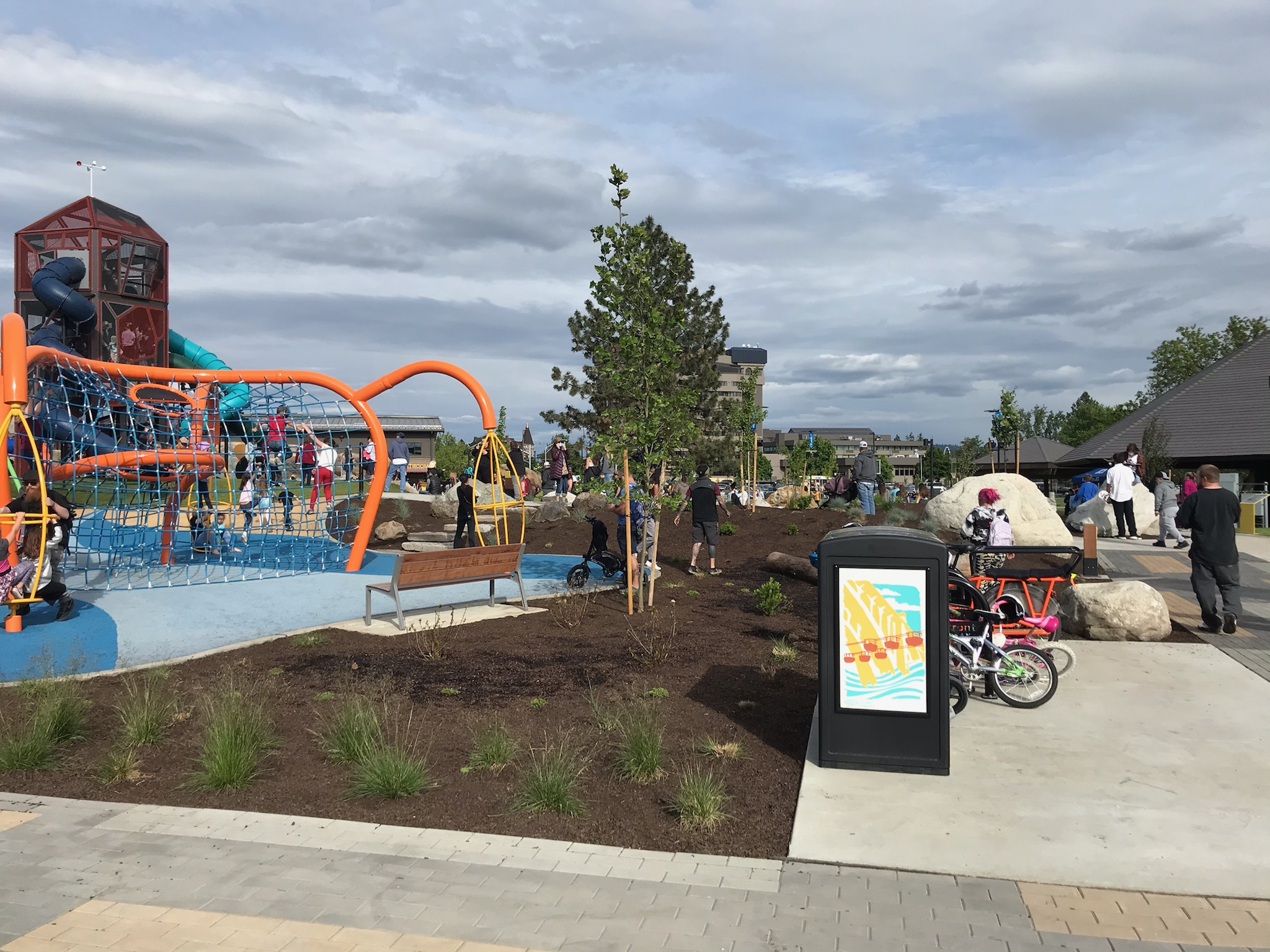
The grand opening of the North Bank Park.

The final major phase of construction associated with the $64 million 2014 park bond was the development of the 40,000-square-foot (3,700 m^{2}) North Bank park which included the Ice Age Floods Playground and the Skate and Wheels Park. Designed to be a destination park that can appeal to all ages and a variety of interests, the grand opening of the North Bank was on May 21, 2021.

The Ice Age Floods Playground is themed after the Missoula floods that shaped the landscape of the region and caters primarily to children, providing an interactive way to learn while they play. It features the three-story Columbian slide tower, a Glacial Dam splash pad, a log-jam climbing wall, and a play fossil dig with buried "fossils" among other playscapes. The climbing wall, which is supposed to represent the ice dam, that caused the ice age floods bears a quote from geologist J Harlen Bretz, who is credited with the then-controversial theory of the ice age floods that created the regions unique geography amid decades of skepticism from the scientific community, the quote reads: "I could conceive of no geological process of erosion to make this topography, except huge, violent rivers of glacial melt water..." In the center of the play area is the Roskelley Performance Climbing Boulder, a climbing rock dedicated to mountaineer and Spokane native, Jess Roskelley, who died in an avalanche in 2019 while descending Howse Peak in Alberta; in addition to bearing his name, the rock has his life motto inscribed on it: "fortitudine vincimus" or "by endurance, we conquer" in Latin.

The Skate and Wheels Park is an 8,000-square-foot (740 m^{2}) skatepark that was designed with input from the public and replaces the makeshift Under The Freeway (UTF) Skatepark built under an Interstate 90 underpass downtown. The Skate and Wheels Park incorporates a flatbar from the UTF Skatepark as the centerpiece among other street features and a wallride and two bowls.

==== Spokane Humane Society Paw Park ====
The City of Spokane announced plans for a dog park to be located on Havermale Island and incorporating the existing Expo '74 forestry shelter in February 2022. Originally called the American Forest Pavilion, it was the Expo exhibit for the American Forest Institute and features wood beams and a high pitched roof which is meant to "reflect the spirit of being in a forest;" shortly after the fair it was moved slightly and outfitted with restrooms. The siting of the park was in part determined to make use of the underutilized shelter as a shade structure in the summer months. The initial construction cost for the park is estimated to be $750,000, which will be wholly funded from donations collected by the Spokane Parks Foundation; the Spokane Humane Society contributed $250,000 to the project. Community interest in a new dog park had been building after a local developer had proposed one to the Spokane Parks and Recreation Board the prior July.

=== Art ===
Public art in Riverfront Park

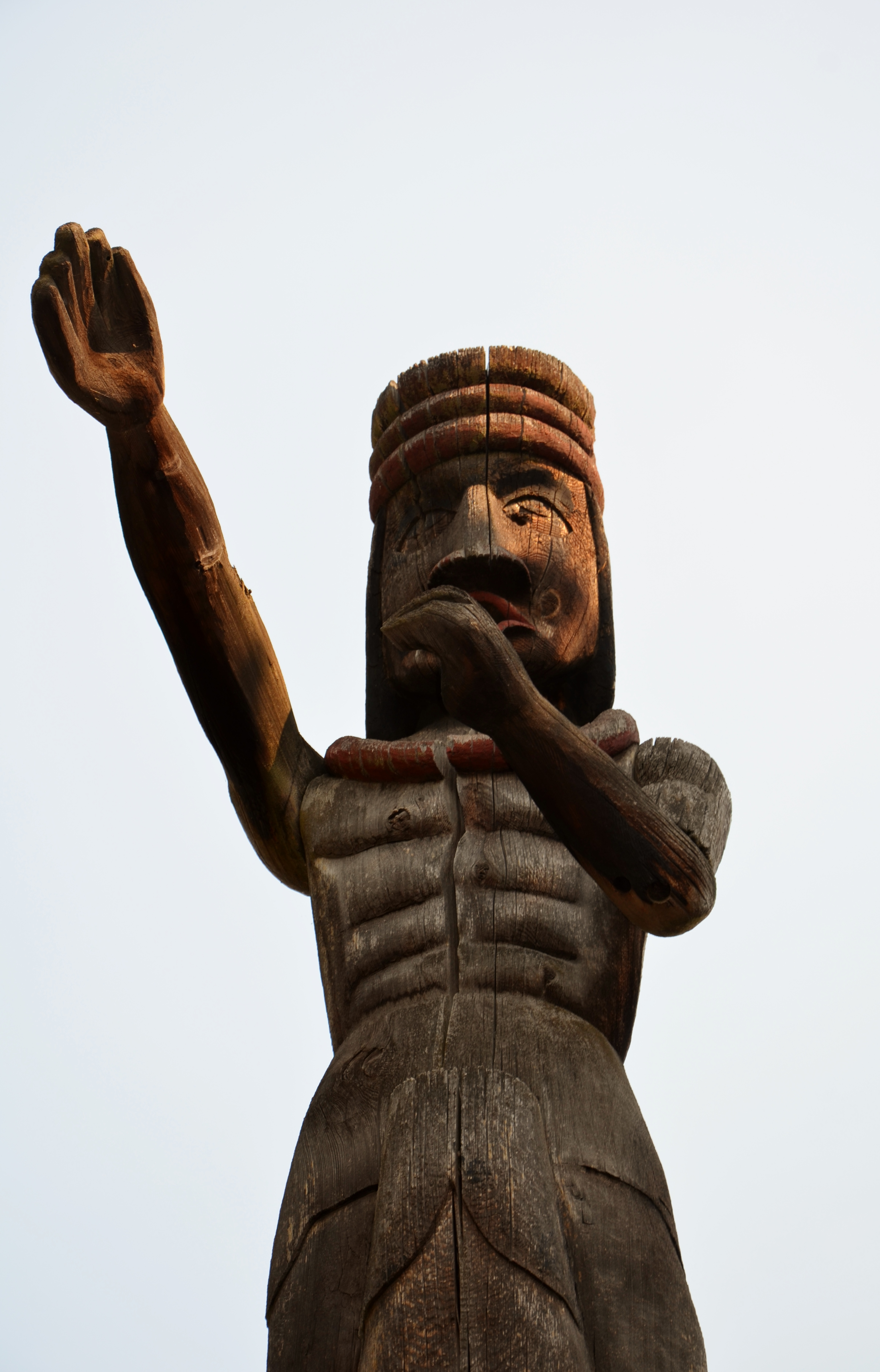
Expo Totem Pole, Charlie Frank and Joe David, 1974

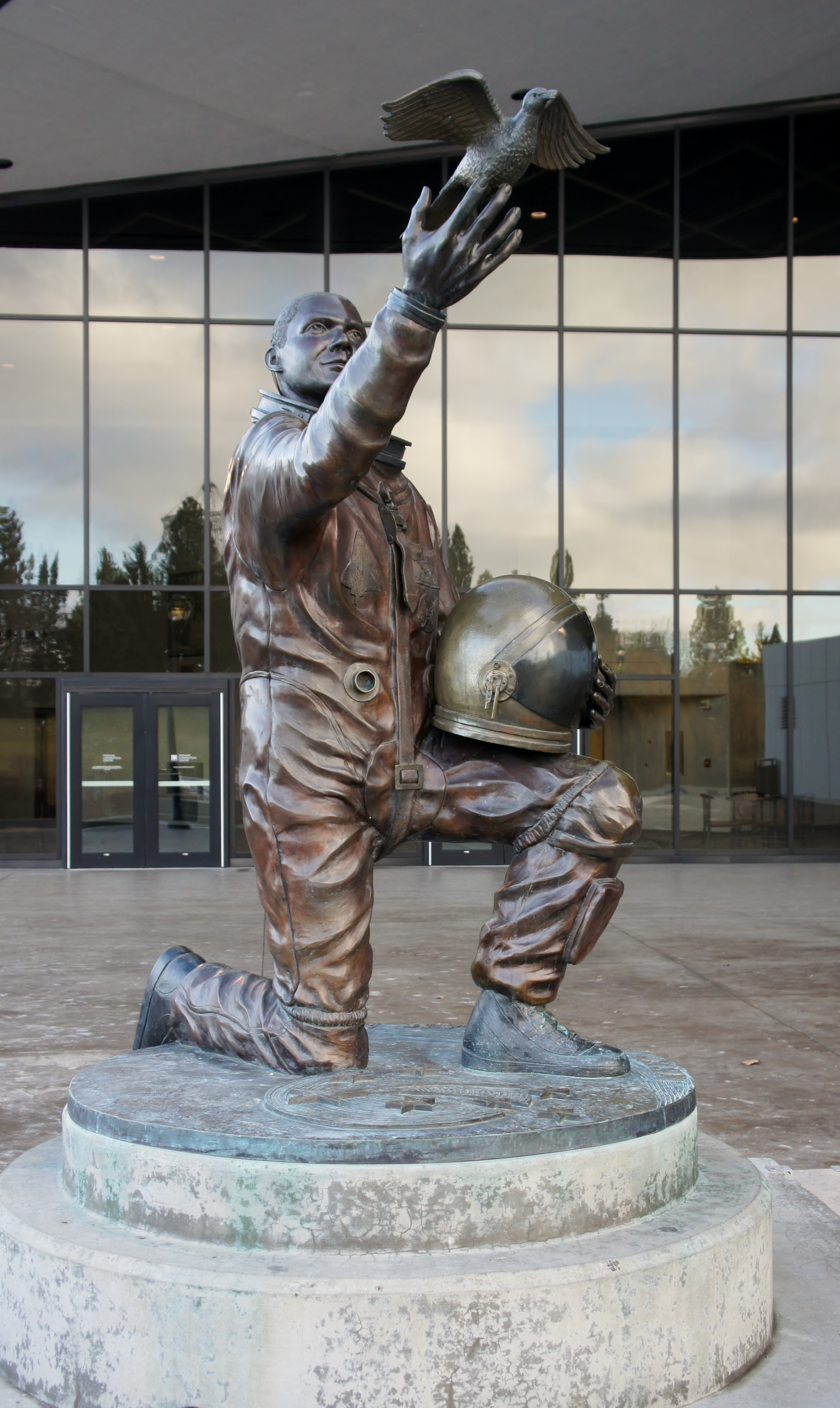
Michael P. Anderson Memorial, Dorothy Fowler, 2006

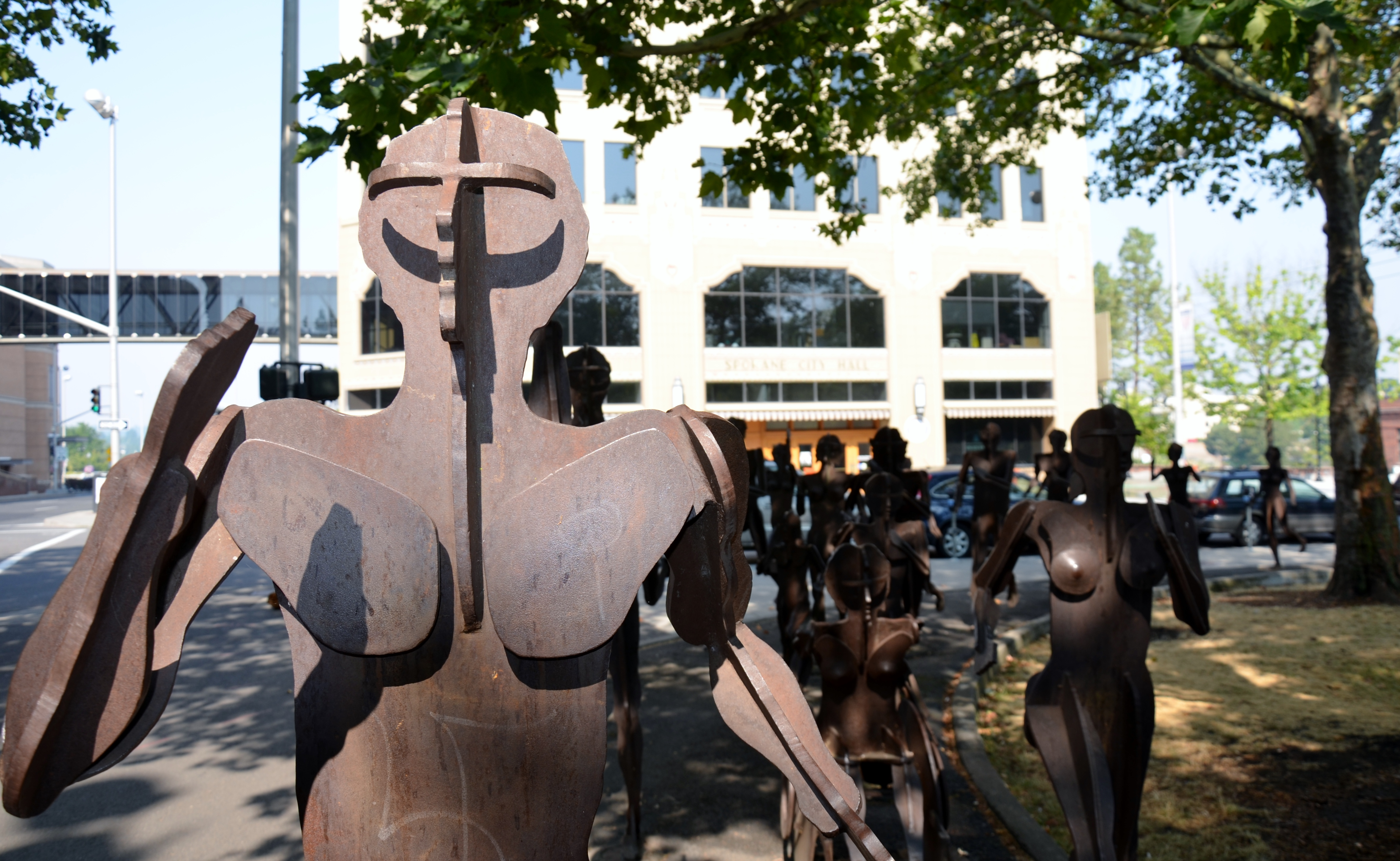
The Joy of Running Together, David Govedare, 1984

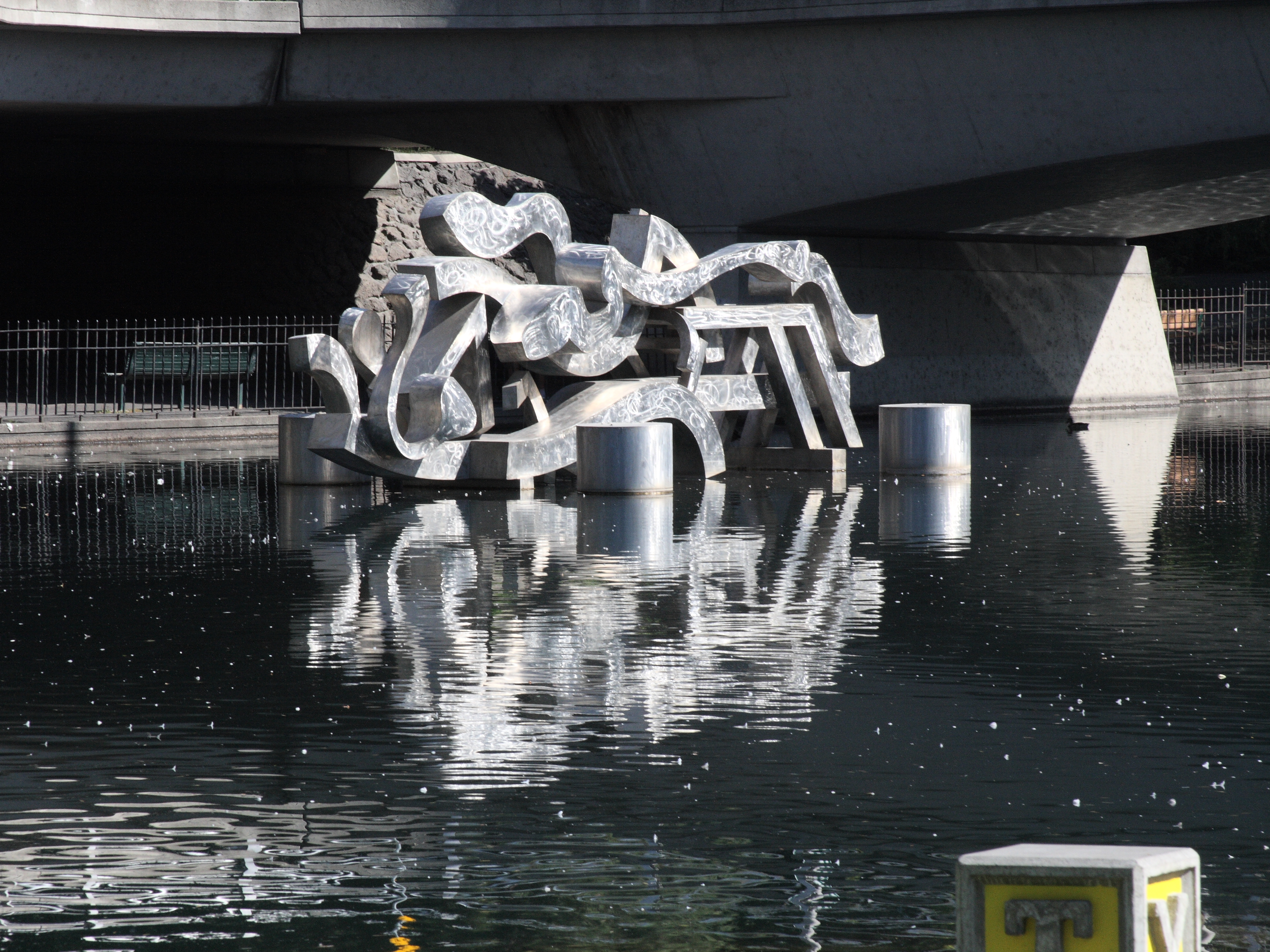
Centennial Sculpture, Harold Balazs, 1978

Riverfront Park features a large quantity of art installations scattered across its landscape, which make up approximately half of the nearly three dozen sculptures installed within the downtown Spokane area. Among the art in the park is a restored 50-foot (15 m) tall butterfly sculpture that was displayed during Expo '74 which has articulating fabric-covered wings that lift and rotate in the wind. More sculptures have been added over the years from a broad spectrum of artists and artistic styles ranging from abstract forms, to lifelike statues, and whimsical sculptures. The pieces also represent a broad range of purposes from a memorial to the veterans of the Vietnam War and notable locals such as astronaut Michael P. Anderson, who was killed in the Space Shuttle Columbia Disaster, to pieces honoring the local Native American heritage, as well as interactive play sculptures, among others.

Local artist, Harold Balazs has a number of pieces installed throughout the park, most notably the Centennial Sculpture, which is an abstract aluminum sculpture floating in the Spokane River, as well as the Rotary Fountain at the southern entrance to the Howard Street Promenade. During the major redevelopment of the park for its 50th anniversary, two additional standalone works were commissioned, The Seeking Place by Sarah Thompson Moore and Stepwall by Meejin Yoon.

==== Garbage Goat ====
One of the park's most popular installations is Goat, a sculpture that was installed in 1974 as part of the art for Expo '74. Commonly referred to as the "Garbage Goat" or the "Garbage Eating Goat", the sculpture is located just east of the Looff Carousel along the southern edge of Riverfront Park. Going along with Expo '74's environmental theme, the sculpture was created as an interactive art piece that doubles as a unique trash collector. Its creation and installation was sponsored by the Spokane Women's Council of Realtors and sculpted by Sister Paula Mary Turnbull, a local nun and leading figure in the Inland Northwest arts scene. As its name suggests, the corten steel sculpture was modeled after a goat and features a vacuum mechanism that sucks up small pieces of garbage through its mouth, allowing users to "feed" it.

In an ironic juxtaposition for the environmentally-themed fair, the art piece was heavily debated before it was even installed, with dairy goat farmers protesting that the creation of the whimsical piece perpetuated the stereotype that goats are reputed to eat anything; they stressed that the public be educated that goats needed to be fed properly like any other animal. A compromise was eventually reached between the farmers and the Expo '74 organizers, which saw the installation of the garbage eating goat sculpture in exchange for real-life dairy goats at the fair getting signage installed that touted their milk production capabilities if fed a proper diet of the "finest of hays and grains".

Over the years, the goat has developed a cult following across generations of Spokanite parents and children. The goat has an unofficial Facebook page with thousands of followers and the Spokane County Regional Solid Waste System has its public educational outreach blog named after it. For its 40th birthday, the City of Spokane put on a celebration of the goat, "feeding" it a slice of birthday cake, and holding a goat-themed party for the public in its honor, which featured beer from a local brewery called Iron Goat Brewing that was sold by the pint at prices found in 1974, the year of the sculpture's creation.

=== Former features and attractions ===
Former attractions

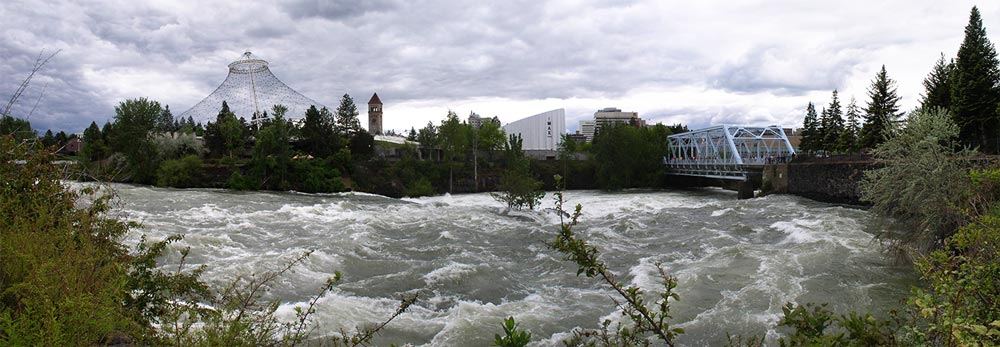
Spokane River running through Riverfront Park on the north side of the US Pavilion and former IMAX theater.

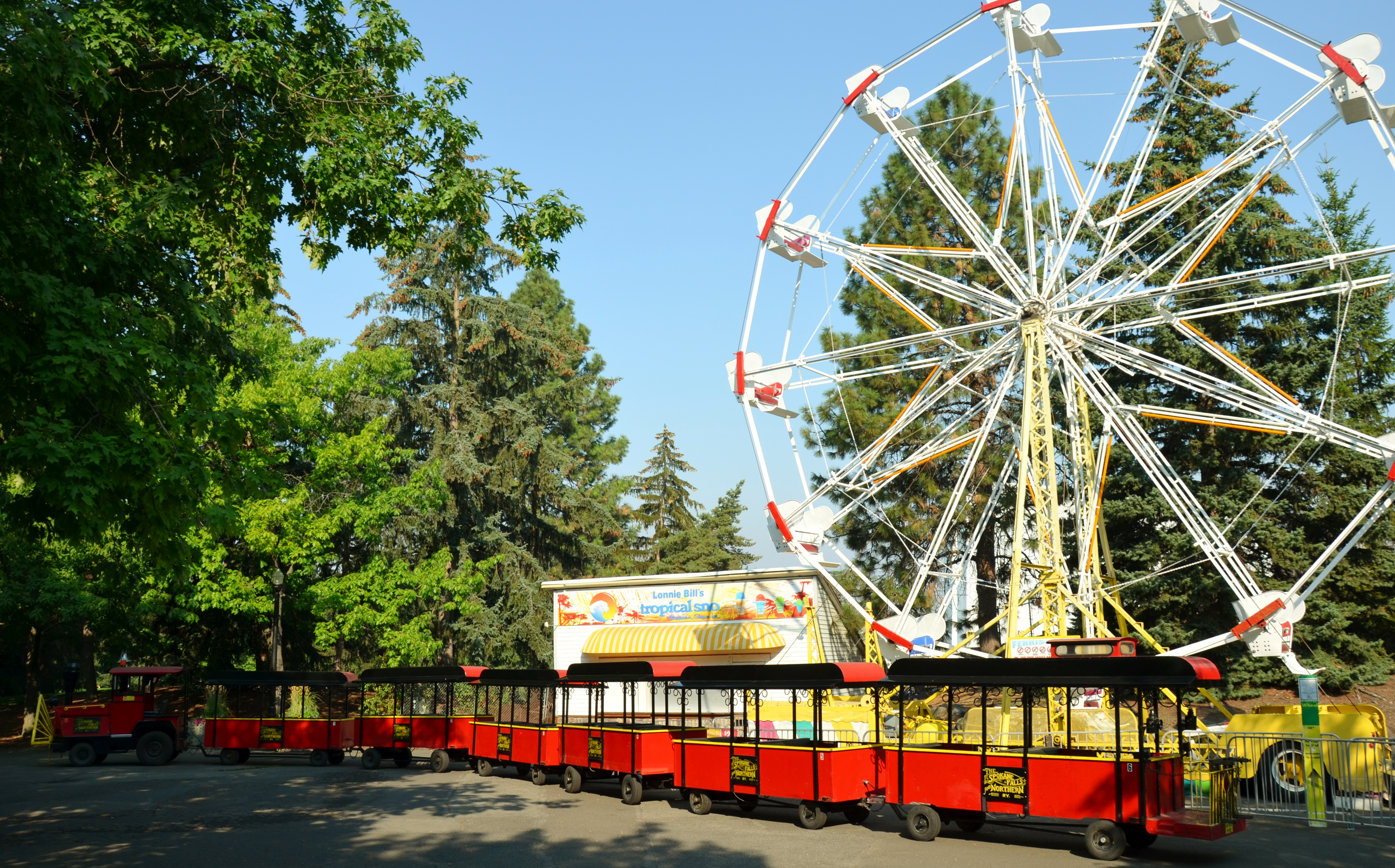
The Tour Train and Ferris Wheel were among the Pavilion Rides

Prior to its redevelopment, Riverfront Park hosted the following features:

- The Ice Palace was a seasonal ice skating rink that was set up underneath the U.S. Pavilion. It was featured from 1977 until its closure in 2017, and was replaced by the permanent Numerica Skating Ribbon during Riverfront Park's redevelopment.
- The IMAX Theater was part of the U.S. Pavilion complex and originally opened in 1978. It reached peak attendance in 2005, but attendance began to wane after an IMAX facility opened at the nearby AMC theater at River Park Square and after it lost licensing to show big-budget Hollywood films. The decision was made in 2016 to permanently close the theater and it was demolished in early 2018 as part of the U.S. Pavilion renovation project in Riverfront Park's redevelopment.
- The Pavilion Rides were a collection of amusement rides owned by the City of Spokane that were set up each summer under the U.S. Pavilion. The rides did not fit in with the new vision of the Pavilion after its redevelopment and were identified by the 2014 master plan to be removed. A new location to host the rides was considered on the redeveloped North Bank, but the proposal was ultimately voted down by the Spokane Park Board in September 2018, and several of the rides were auctioned off.

=== Potential attractions ===
==== Zip line ====
A zip line was originally proposed as an attraction during the 2016–2021 redevelopment of the park. Though not selected as a part of the redevelopment project, it has since gained traction and on May 9, 2022, Spokane City Council voted 5–1 in favor of continuing project planning of the zip line. Running from A Place of Truth Plaza near city hall to Glover Field Park in Peaceful Valley, under the Monroe Street Bridge, the zip line would span 1,400 feet.

== Hydropower ==
=== Early history ===
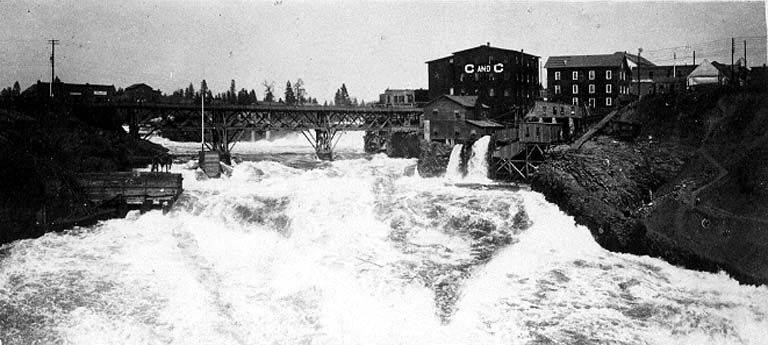
In 1885, the C & C Flour Mill was the site of the first electricity to be produced in Spokane, utilizing the Spokane River for hydroelectricity.

The fast-moving Spokane River and Spokane Falls within and around Riverfront Park has been harnessed for its hydropower ever since the area began to be settled in the 1870s when flumes and waterwheels were used to mechanically drive sawmills and flour mills located along the river. On September 2, 1885, hydroelectricity was used to power Spokane (then-named Spokane Falls) for the first time, illuminating only 10 to 11 arc lights in the downtown business district, when George A. Fitch installed a secondhand Brush electric arc dynamo generator, dismantled from the SS Columbia steamship, in the basement of the C & C Flour Mill located along the river.

As the demand for electricity increased, Fitch was bought out the following year by a group of local businessmen who formed the Spokane Falls Electric Light and Power Company. The group purchased 1,200 incandescent bulbs from Thomas Edison's company and, as part of the purchase agreement, agreed to only use Edison-patented equipment to power them. A 30-kW plant from Edison was soon purchased and installed on the Spokane River's North Channel along the Post Street Bridge, which today forms the western boundary of Riverfront Park, and powered among other things, the city's first opera. The company, looking to expand, would seek an investment from the Edison Illuminating Company in New York, and would rebrand as the Edison Electric Illuminating Co. of Spokane Falls (EEICSF), headquartering in downtown Spokane at the southwest corner of Sprague Avenue and Howard Street.

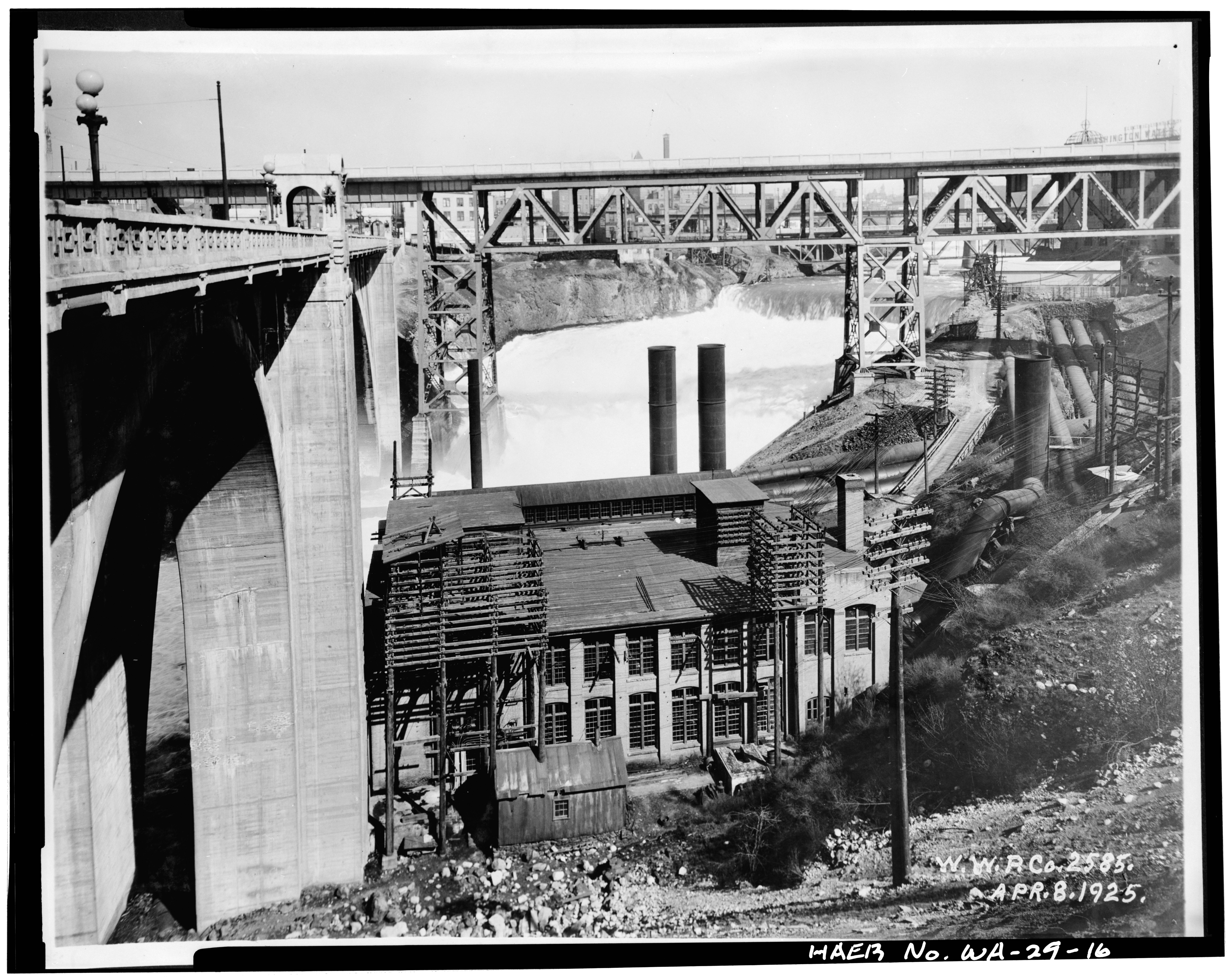
WWP's Monroe Street Power Station in 1925, with its powerhouse in the foreground and penstocks and dam in the background.

By the late 1880s, demand for electricity in the young city was skyrocketing, including 24-hour electric service in the wealthy Browne's Addition neighborhood. This led the EEICSF to expand, installing a new generator at their plant that increased its generating capacity by four times, and also sparked the formation of two competing power companies — the Spokane Falls Water Power Co. in 1887 and Washington Water Power (now known as Avista Utilities) in 1889. Though the demand was high around this time, attaining financing to further the expansion of hydroelectricity began to prove difficult, especially for EEICSF and its east coast-based investors. Many, including Edison himself, began to favor the output consistency of steam power, which was not dependent on the highly-variable flow of a river, as the future of electricity generation.

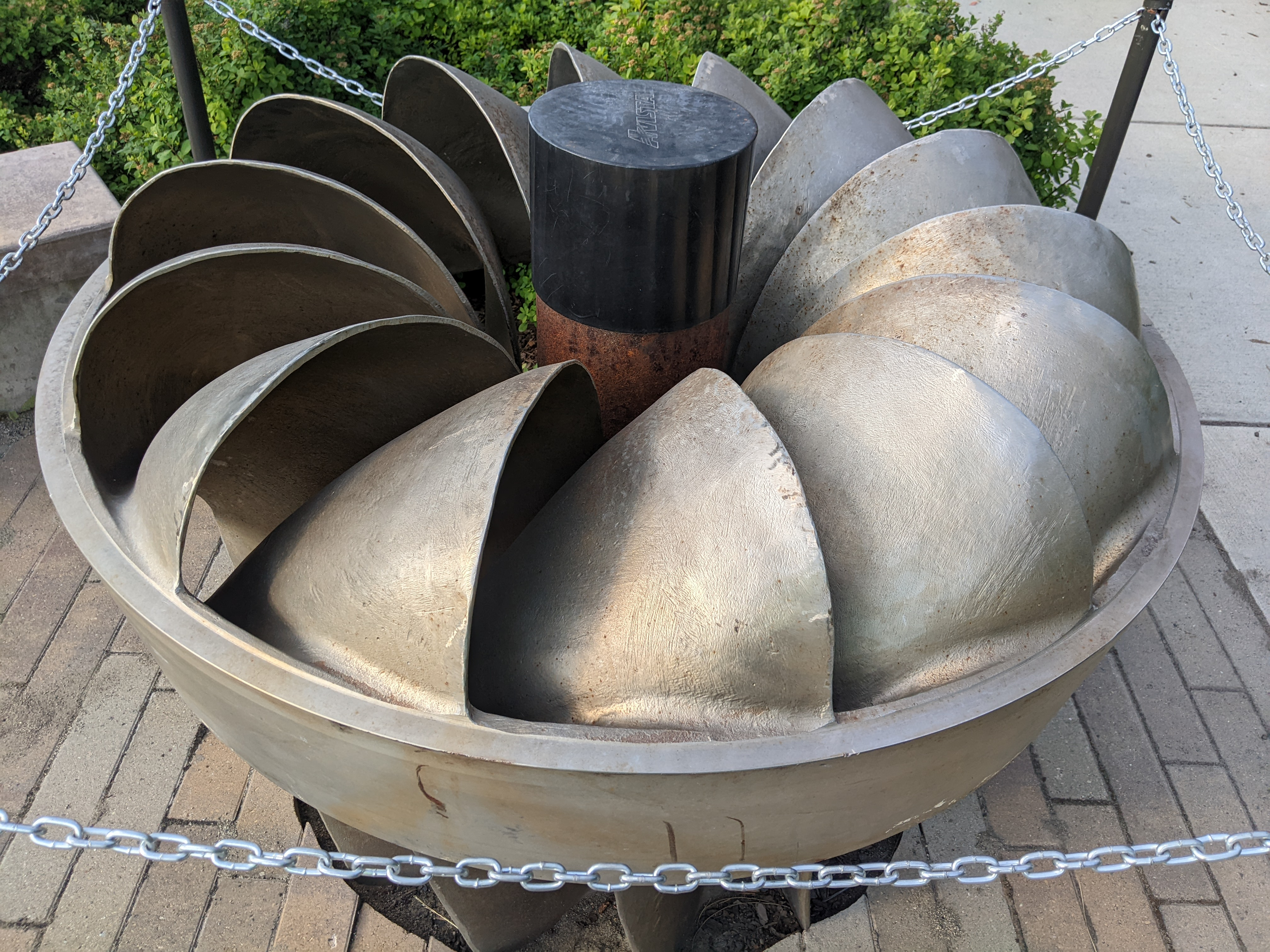
Hydroelectric turbine on display

Despite the market conditions, entrepreneurs at the newly established companies continued to forge ahead in their investment with hydroelectric power generation. Washington Water Power was in the process of installing a generator on the Lower Spokane Falls, just outside of present-day Riverfront Park, when Spokane's Great Fire struck in August 1889. After the fire and the rebuilding of the city, demand for electricity grew so rapidly that Washington Water Power moved ahead with plans for an even larger power generating facility on the Lower Falls and constructed an 18 feet (5.5 m) tall rock-crib dam made of timber, to raise the water levels behind its Lower Falls generator. The construction of the dam, along with a new powerhouse, collectively became known as the Monroe Street Power Station and was completed on November 12, 1890. The enormous generating capacity of the new facility began an era of dominance for Washington Water Power over the other companies that operated smaller generators in the vicinity. Washington Water Power gradually began to purchase portions of the EEISCF, taking a controlling stake in their competitor by 1891, and also acquired other companies that eventually became unified under the Washington Water Power Company name. The dynamos of the other companies were consolidated into the Monroe Street Power Station, which increased its generating capacity from 894 kilowatts to 1,439 kilowatts in 1892.

=== Modern history ===
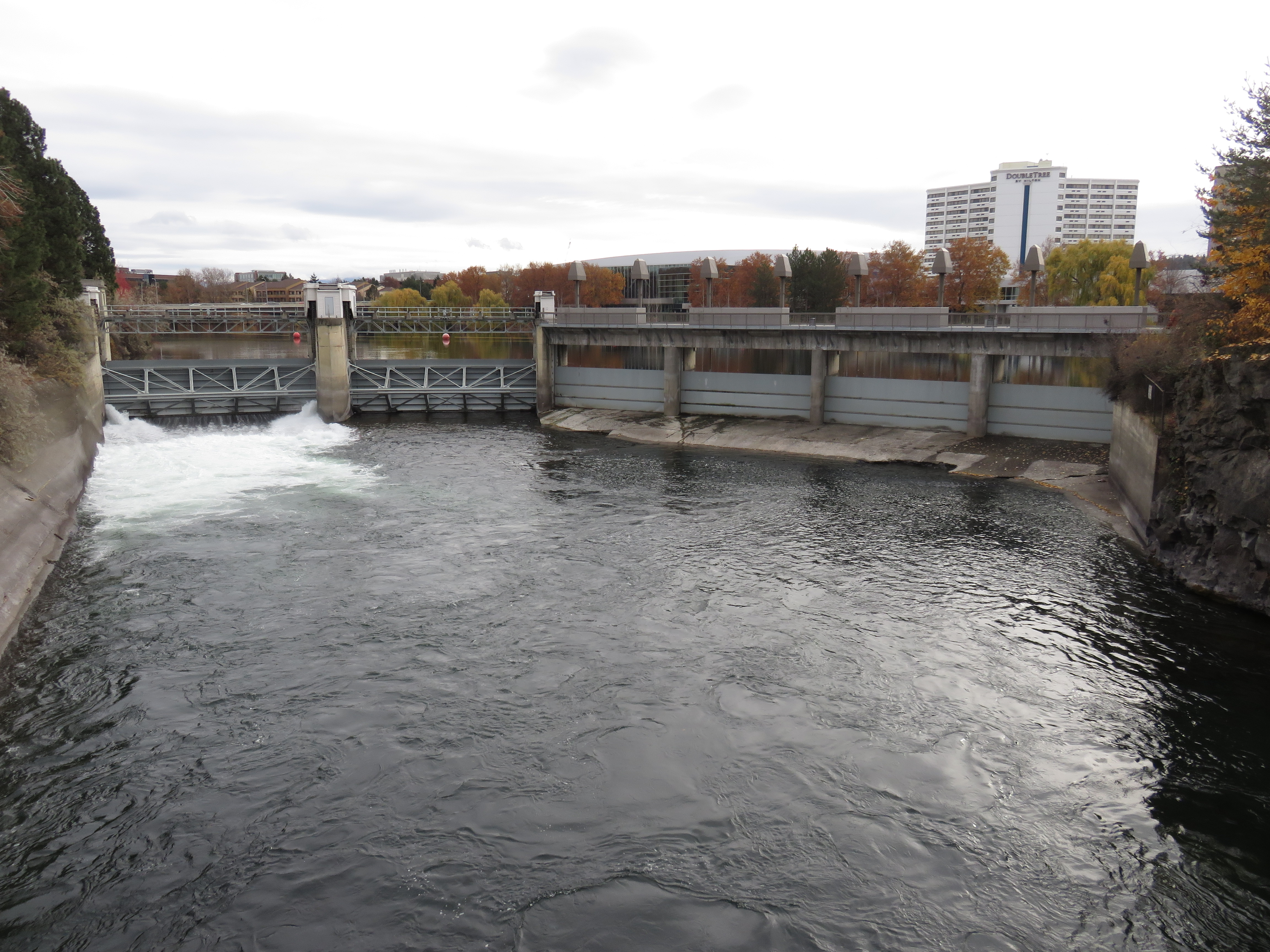
The Upper Falls Diversion Dam, built in 1922, diverts water through the Spokane River's South Channel into the Upper Falls Power Plant.

In 1922, Washington Water Power would construct an additional dam known as the Upper Falls Diversion Dam at the eastern tip of Havermale Island, spanning across the North Channel of the Spokane River over the Upper Spokane Falls. The dam would divert water through the river's South Channel to a 10 MW generator at the Upper Falls Power Plant which was built that same year.

Washington Water Power's timber Monroe Street Dam at the Lower Spokane Falls was damaged in a high water event and eventually replaced with a concrete gravity dam in 1974 in the same location just a few hundred feet west of what would become Riverfront Park. The reconstruction of the dam was completed just before Expo '74 and included the construction of Huntington Park, immediately adjacent to present-day Riverfront Park, that allowed visitors to see water fed into the plant's turbines. In 1992, a project at the Monroe Street Power Station replaced its original powerhouse with an underground one, further expanding Huntington Park by creating a new plaza over the underground powerhouse. The project also replaced its original, century-old 1890 generator (which was then donated to the Henry Ford Museum in Dearborn, Michigan for permanent display) with the station's current 15-MW generator.

=== Legacy ===
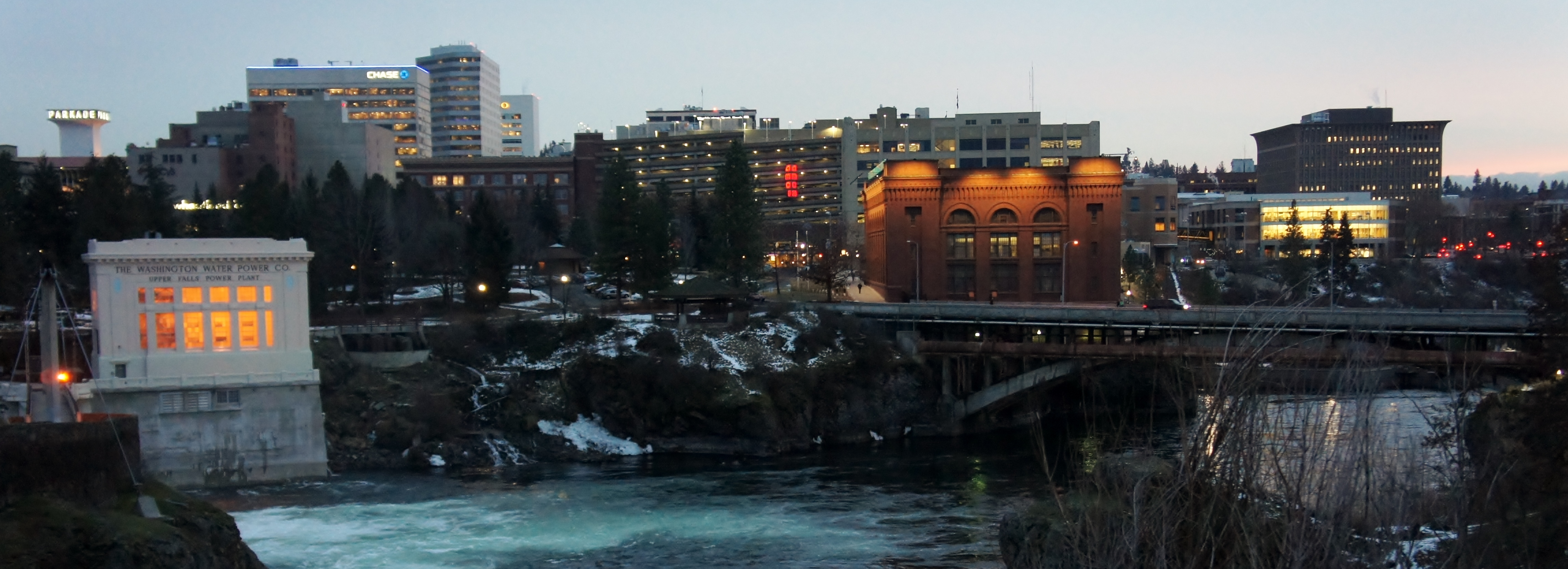
The Upper Falls Power Plant and former WWP electric substation

The impacts of hydroelectricity generation on the Spokane Falls throughout Spokane's history remains visible in Riverfront Park today and plays a major role in its attractions. The adjacent Huntington Park, Lower Spokane Falls, and Monroe Street Power Station are the primary sightseeing features of Riverfront Park's Numerica SkyRide. Additionally, a 2014 project that renovated the Avista Utilities-owned Huntington Park at the Lower Falls, added a new plaza in front of Spokane City Hall that created an unofficial extension of Riverfront Park, effectively bridging the two parks together. Hydroelectric power generation on the Upper Spokane Falls has also shaped Riverfront Park's features. In addition to the Upper Falls Power Plant being listed as an official Riverfront Park sightseeing attraction, the construction of the Upper Falls Diversion Dam created the calm waters of Riverfront Park's South Channel, which is home to a number of the park's attractions including the Looff Carousel, Red Wagon, First Interstate Center for the Arts, and Howard Street pedestrian bridge. The calm water enables many of these attractions, including the steps and floating stage at the First Interstate Center, as well as the lowered viewing platforms on the South Channel Bridge allowing visitors to interact with the river. Avista's Post Street Electric Substation is home to the Mobius Science Center children's museum.

== Festivals and events ==
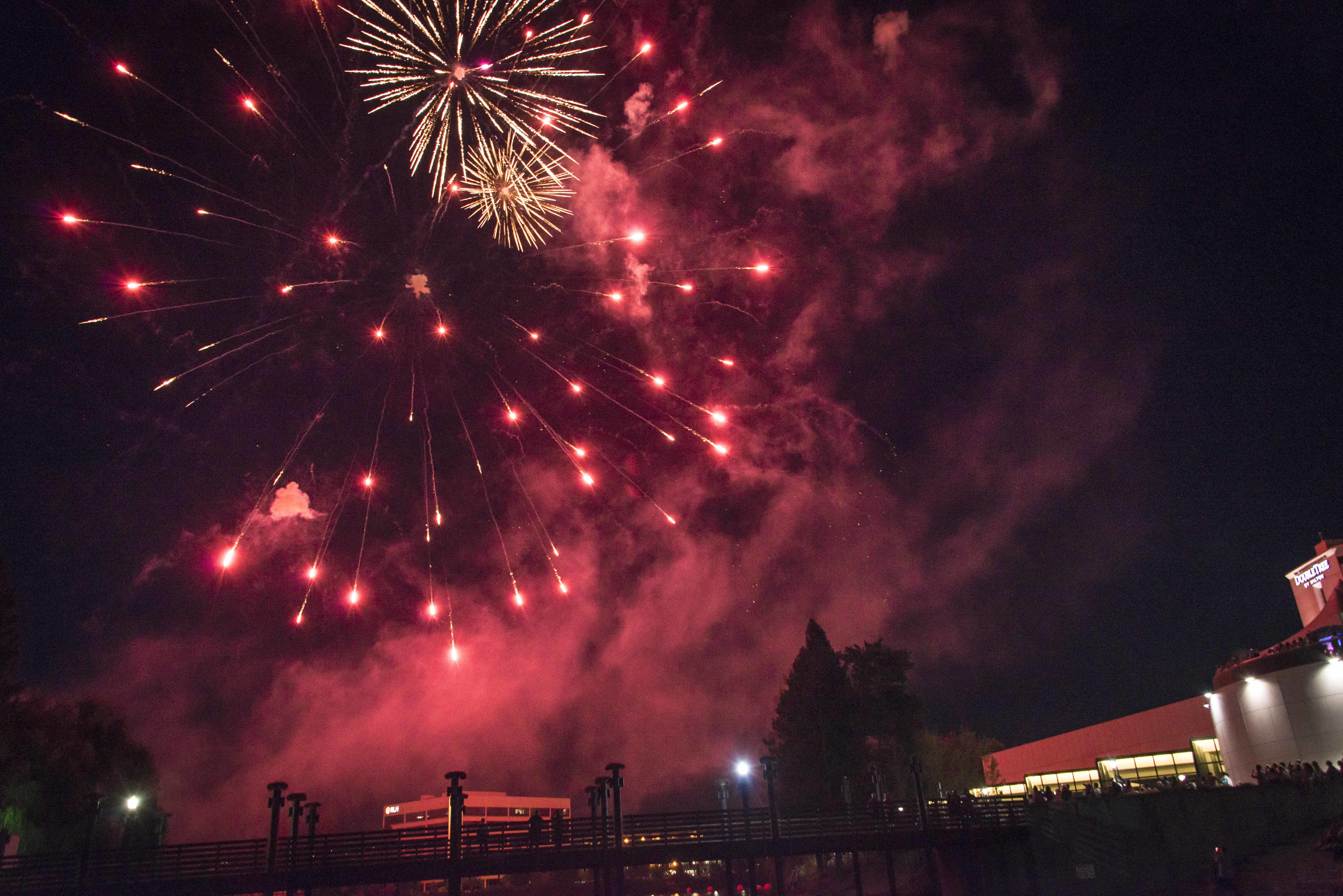
Fourth of July at Riverfront Park

Every year, Riverfront Park plays host to a number of prominent Spokane events including:

- The annual Lilac Bloomsday Run, held in May, uses Riverfront Park as the site of its official post-race activities.
- Spokane Hoopfest, held annually in June, uses Riverfront Park for exhibitors and vendors and its Nike Center Court.
- The Fourth of July festival and fireworks display.
- The Royal Fireworks Concert, an annual concert ending in Handel's Music for Royal Fireworks and a corresponding fireworks display.
- Gathering at the Falls Powwow, an annual celebration held in summer that celebrates the living culture of native people.
- Unity in the Community, an annual celebration of diversity.
- Pig Out in the Park, an annual food and music festival hosted in the park during Labor Day weekend.
