= Paula Mary Turnbull =

American sculptor and nun (1921–2018)

- Turnbull in 1974
- Born: Mary Margaret Turnbull; May 26, 1921; Seattle, Washington, U.S.
- Died: July 20, 2018 (aged 97); Spokane, Washington, U.S.
- Resting place: Holy Cross Cemetery
- Education: Holy Names College (BA); Siena Heights University (MFA)
- Notable work: Garbage Goat

Sister Paula Mary Turnbull (May 26, 1921 – July 20, 2018) was an American sculptor and educator. Known as the "welding nun", she created liturgical and whimsical metal sculptures. Her most famous work is Garbage Goat, a steel sculpture in Riverfront Park in Spokane, Washington, that incorporates a vacuum apparatus allowing the goat to "eat" trash. During her career, Turnbull created dozens of public artworks in Spokane and helped organize the installation of public art at the Expo '74 world's fair.

Turnbull lived at the convent of the Sisters of the Holy Names of Jesus and Mary where she had an art studio. She taught sculpture and art history at Fort Wright College for 25 years and chaired the college's art department. She received degrees from Holy Names College, Siena Heights University, the University of Washington, the Parsons School of Design, and the Art Institute of Chicago.

== Early life and education ==
Mary Margaret Turnbull was born on May 26, 1921, in Seattle, Washington, to Marie Leger and William Garfield Turnbull. She grew up in Alki Point near the beach. She attended Alki Elementary and graduated from Holy Names Academy. She entered the Sisters of the Holy Names of Jesus and Mary in Marylhurst, Oregon, and took her religious vows on August 5, 1941.

Turnbull earned her BA in education and art from Holy Names College in Spokane. She attended Siena Heights University in Michigan in 1956, earning her MFA. She later received advanced degrees from the University of Washington in Seattle, the Parsons School of Design, and the Art Institute of Chicago. She studied under George Tsutakawa in 1963 and Anthony Caro in the late 1970s.

== Teaching career and later life ==
Turnbull taught at elementary schools operated by the Sisters of the Holy Names, including St. Francis of Assisi and St. Patrick's in Spokane, Sacred Heart in Seattle, and All Saints in Portland, Oregon. Beginning in the 1950s, she taught art at Holy Names College (later known as Fort Wright College). Turnbull taught art history and sculpture at Fort Wright for 25 years and chaired the college's art department in the 1970s. She was named Fort Wright Center's artist-in-residence in 1981. For 35 years, she led annual month-long art study groups in Europe and Mexico. During these trips, she would paint watercolors en plein air. Her students included Deborah Copenhaver Fellows and Jim Hodges.

Turnbull lived at the Sisters of the Holy Names of Jesus and Mary convent in Spokane. The Holy Names Art Studio was designed for her on the convent's property. She gave tours of the studio and taught classes, including a weekly figure-drawing class for which she invited nude models. While in her studio, she abstained from wearing her heavy woolen habit to more comfortably use her welding torch.

Turnbull worked in her studio up until her retirement in March 2018. Proceeds from a retrospective of her works went towards a retirement fund for her convent and African missions. She died at Brookdale South Regal on July 20, 2018. She was interred at Holy Cross Cemetery.

== Art ==
Turnbull was an accomplished sculptor, known for her liturgical and whimsical welded metal sculptures. Her technique of creating layered copper tubing evoked the appearance of flowing fabric and became a trademark of hers. She was also a ceramist, woodcarver, and watercolorist. In a 2000 essay in Sisters Today, she wrote that "art tells a story and helps the viewer recognize that deep longing for beauty and the presence of God in all creation."

=== The "welding nun" ===
Early in her career, Turnbull became known as the "welding nun", gaining recognition in the 1950s and 1960s for her liturgical artworks. She created pieces for public display as well as for churches, schools, and private collections throughout the region. Her works included a two-foot crucifix for the St. Aloysius Church convent's chapel, walnut statues for cemeteries, crosses made from mahogany and birch, ceramic holy water fonts, and welded representations of saints. At the Sisters of the Holy Names convent, she designed the metal gates and a sculpture of founder Marie Rose Durocher.

=== Expo '74 world's fair ===
In preparation for Expo '74, Spokane's environmentally-themed world's fair, Turnbull was appointed to the Expo Visual Arts Advisory Committee in 1972. She helped to arrange for the installation of more than a dozen public artworks in Riverfront Park, including pieces by George Tsutakawa and Harold Balazs. Turnbull herself created her most famous work for the expo, the Garbage Goat.

Following Expo '74, Turnbull was commissioned by Australia to design a sundial for Spokane in the park where the Australian pavilion had been located. The seven-foot steel sundial, unveiled in 1976, is embossed with bronze depictions of fauna and flora endemic to Australia on its gnomon.

=== Garbage Goat ===
Turnbull's most iconic work is the Garbage Goat in Spokane's Riverfront Park. Created for the 1974 world's fair, the corten steel sculpture depicts a billy goat and is surrounded by basalt columns. A button embedded in the basalt can be pressed to activate an internal vacuum apparatus. Garbage that is "fed" to the goat is sucked into a receptacle behind the basalt wall. The sculpture was commissioned by the Women's Council of Realtors. Originally, a recording of a voice asking for trash would play as people passed by.

Local dairy goat farmers, upset that the Garbage Goat misrepresented the diets of goats, protested the sculpture. The editor of The Dairy Goat Journal wrote that the sculpture was "degrading, debasing, and grossly misleading". Letters to the editor and columns in the Spokane Chronicle alternatively decried the public's habit of feeding trash to goats at fairs and extolled the role of the Garbage Goat in keeping the area free of litter. As a compromise with the dairy farmers, a sign was displayed near the Garbage Goat describing the proper diets and value of dairy goats.

Since its inception in the 1970s, Garbage Goat has become an iconic landmark, inspiring a "secret goat culture" in Spokane as well as a series of goat-themed businesses. At a 40th birthday celebration for the goat in 2014, the Spokane Parks & Recreation Department estimated that it had "eaten" over 14,000 cubic yards of litter.

=== Public art installations ===
During her long career, Turnbull created dozens of public art installations in Spokane. She designed panels depicting athletes at the Hillyard Aquatic Center, the metal bear mascot at Central Valley High School, the sasquatch statue at the Spokane Community College, and a small statue of baseball player Eddie Gaedel at O'Doherty's Irish Grille. Her 2006 work Fish On is a memorial to Mike Cmos, a worker who died in an accident at the Riverside Park Water Reclamation Facility.

Turnbull's statue Mrs. J.J. Browne and Daughter, depicting 19th-century Spokane resident Anna Stratton Browne and her daughter, was created as part of Spokane's Art in Public Places project. The bronze, brass, copper and steel statue was inspired by Georges Seurat's A Sunday Afternoon on the Island of La Grande Jatte. It was installed in Browne's Addition in 2005. Mrs. Browne's head was stolen in 2014. Once the head was located it was reattached and reinforced with a pipe that extended the length of the neck. Firefighters from the station across the street once stopped an attempted kidnapping of the statue.

== Selected works ==
- Garbage Goat (1974)
- Australian Sundial (1976)
- Mrs. J.J. Browne and Daughter (2005)
- Fish On (2006)
