= Holy Names Academy =

Private school in Seattle, Washington, US

Location
- 728 21st Avenue East; Seattle, (King County), Washington 98112; United States; 47°37′34.19″N 122°18′14.94″W

Information
- Type: Private
- Religious affiliation: Roman Catholic
- Established: 1880
- Founders: Sisters of the Holy Names of Jesus and Mary
- CEEB code: 481100
- Head of school: Kim Dawson
- Faculty: 45
- Grades: 9–12
- Gender: Girls only
- Enrollment: 535 (2025-2026)
- Average class size: 21
- Student to teacher ratio: 13:1
- Colors: Maroon and grey
- Athletics conference: WIAA 3A – Seattle Metropolitan League
- Team name: Cougars
- Accreditation: NWAIS, Cognia
- Newspaper: The Dome
- Yearbook: Excalibur
- Tuition: $25,020 (2025-26)
- Website: holynames-sea.org

Holy Names Academy is a Catholic private all-girls college-preparatory high school, founded by the Sisters of the Holy Names of Jesus and Mary in 1880 and located on the east slope of Seattle's Capitol Hill. It is the oldest continually operating school in Washington state. Located in the Roman Catholic Archdiocese of Seattle, the school is governed by an independent Board of Trustees, and is under the trusteeship of the Sisters of the Holy Names; a number of religious sisters are on the board or the faculty/staff. The school has been named a Blue Ribbon School by the U.S. Department of Education four separate times, and has been multiple times ranked among "America's Most Challenging High Schools" in an annual survey by The Washington Post.

== History ==
The school was officially founded on June 15, 1880, by the Sisters of the Holy Names of Jesus and Mary. Holy Names Academy was founded before Washington officially became a state in 1889. . Its first pupils were 21 day students, one boarding student, and one music student. Initially it was located in two rented houses at the corner of 2nd Avenue and Seneca Street in downtown Seattle. In 1885 the academy moved to its first purpose-built home, a multi-story structure in the Second Empire style crowned with a tall steeple. It was located on 7th Avenue near Jackson Street in what is now in the Chinatown/International District. An advertisement in Polk's Seattle City Directory from 1895 stated: "Thorough instruction is given in all the English branches, art, music, elocution and modern languages. Plain sewing and every variety of fancy needlework taught without extra charge, stenography and typewriting are among the elective studies."

By 1904 planned regrading works on Jackson Street meant another move for the school to what would be their present home in the Capitol Hill neighborhood. Construction began in 1906 and was completed in 1908. The building on 7th Avenue was demolished that same year. The architect of the new domed building, designed in the Baroque Revival style, was Albert Breitung. Its design has been preserved over the years with few exterior changes.

The adjacent Jeanne Marie McAteer Lee Gymnasium was built in 1990 on what was previously tennis courts. In 2017, the school opened the Mary Herche Pavilion, a 3-story structure that connects the original building and the gym, and features a student commons area, a fitness center for all students and faculty, an expanded cafeteria with outdoor seating, and other improvements.

By 2018, the Academy recognized challenges to the school’s long-term sustainability, notably the acute lack of parking in a rapidly changing Capitol Hill neighborhood and insufficient facilities for a thriving athletics program. In response, the school undertook one of the largest capital initiatives in its history—the Foundation for the Future campaign—to support the construction of an underground parking garage and a new athletic complex atop it. Starting in 2019, the previous gym was removed, the site was excavated for a five-level, 243-vehicle garage, and a new Jeanne Marie McAteer Lee Athletic Complex rose at the Roy Street end of the HNA campus. The project was completed in fall 2020.

Holy Names Academy had originally incorporated a boarding school and grade school. A normal school was added in 1908. The normal school closed in 1930, the grade school in 1963, and the boarding school in 1967.

== Architecture ==
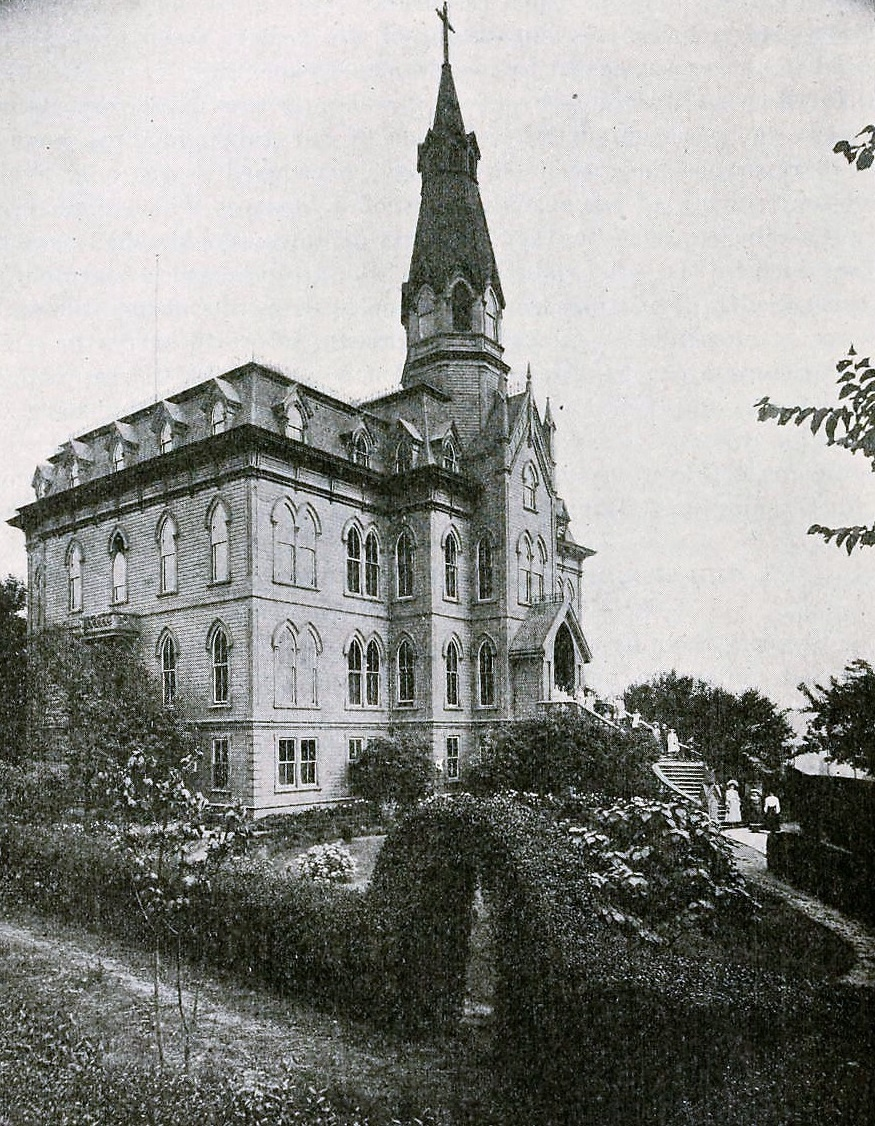
The school's first permanent building photographed in 1905

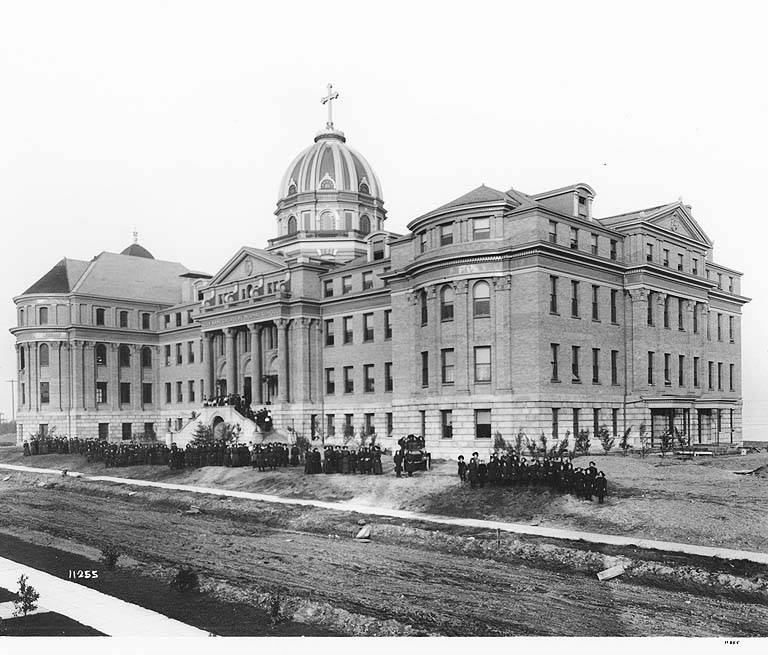
The school's present building shortly after its completion in 1908

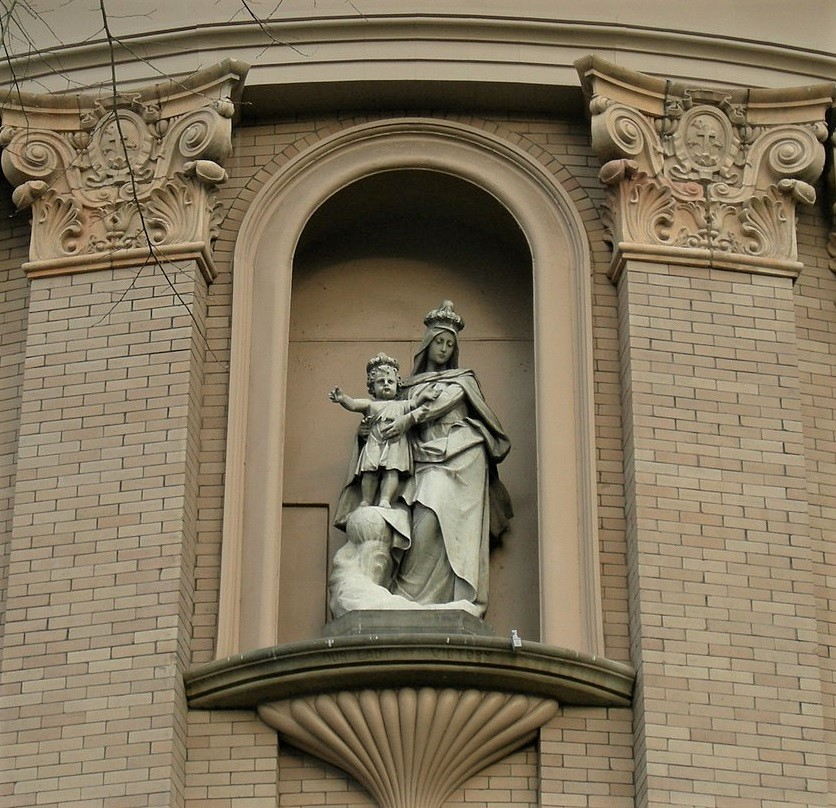
Statue of Mary with the child Jesus on the building's exterior

== Athletics ==
Holy Names Academy has teams for Basketball, Bowling, Cheer, Crew, Cross Country, Flag Football, Golf, Gymnastics, Lacrosse, Slowpitch Softball, Soccer, Softball, Swim/Dive, Tennis, Track/Field, Ultimate Frisbee, and Volleyball. It has won a total of 18 team state titles:

- Basketball (1): 2011
- Cross Country (2): 2014, 2016
- Golf (3): 2001, 2009, 2010
- Gymnastics (3): 2017, 2018, 2019
- Soccer (1): 1999
- Swim/Dive (1): 2005
- Tennis (1): 2017
- Track (6): 1998, 1999, 2000, 2005, 2011, 2019

== Notable alumnae ==
- Paula Mary Turnbull (c. 1939), welding nun
- Jan Haag (1951), founder of the American Film Institute's Directing Workshop for Women, textile artist, and poet
- Lynn Kessler (1958), Washington State legislator and House Majority Leader
- Kathleen Ross SNJM (1959), founding President, Heritage University
- Mary C. Boys SNJM (1965), theologian, scholar, Dean of Academic Affairs at Union Theological Seminary (New York City)
- Catherine LaCugna (1970), feminist Catholic theologian
- Katherine Zappone (1972), Irish legislator and government minister
- Kathleen McGinn (1976), economist and professor at Harvard Business School
- Meagan Flynn (1985), Supreme Court Justice, State of Oregon
- Angela Rye (1998), former pundit and podcaster
- Lindsay Meyer (2007), Olympic rowing athlete
