= Kathleen Ross =

Kathleen Ross, SNJM, is founding president of Heritage University, which opened in 1982.

A member of the religious order of the Sisters of the Holy Names of Jesus and Mary, she graduated from Fort Wright College with a B.A., from Georgetown University with a M.A., and from the Claremont Graduate School with a Ph.D., where she studied with Peter Drucker and Howard Bowen. In 1997 she was a MacArthur Fellow. She is the 2011 CGU Distinguished Alumni Award Recipient. She currently serves on the Board of Trustees of Holy Names University in Oakland, CA.

== Awards ==
- 2010 Henry Paley Memorial Award
- 1995 Washington State Medal of Merit award
- 1997 MacArthur Fellows Program
- 1989 Harold McGraw Prize in education
- 1991 John Caroll Award, by Georgetown University
