= Art Institute of Seattle =

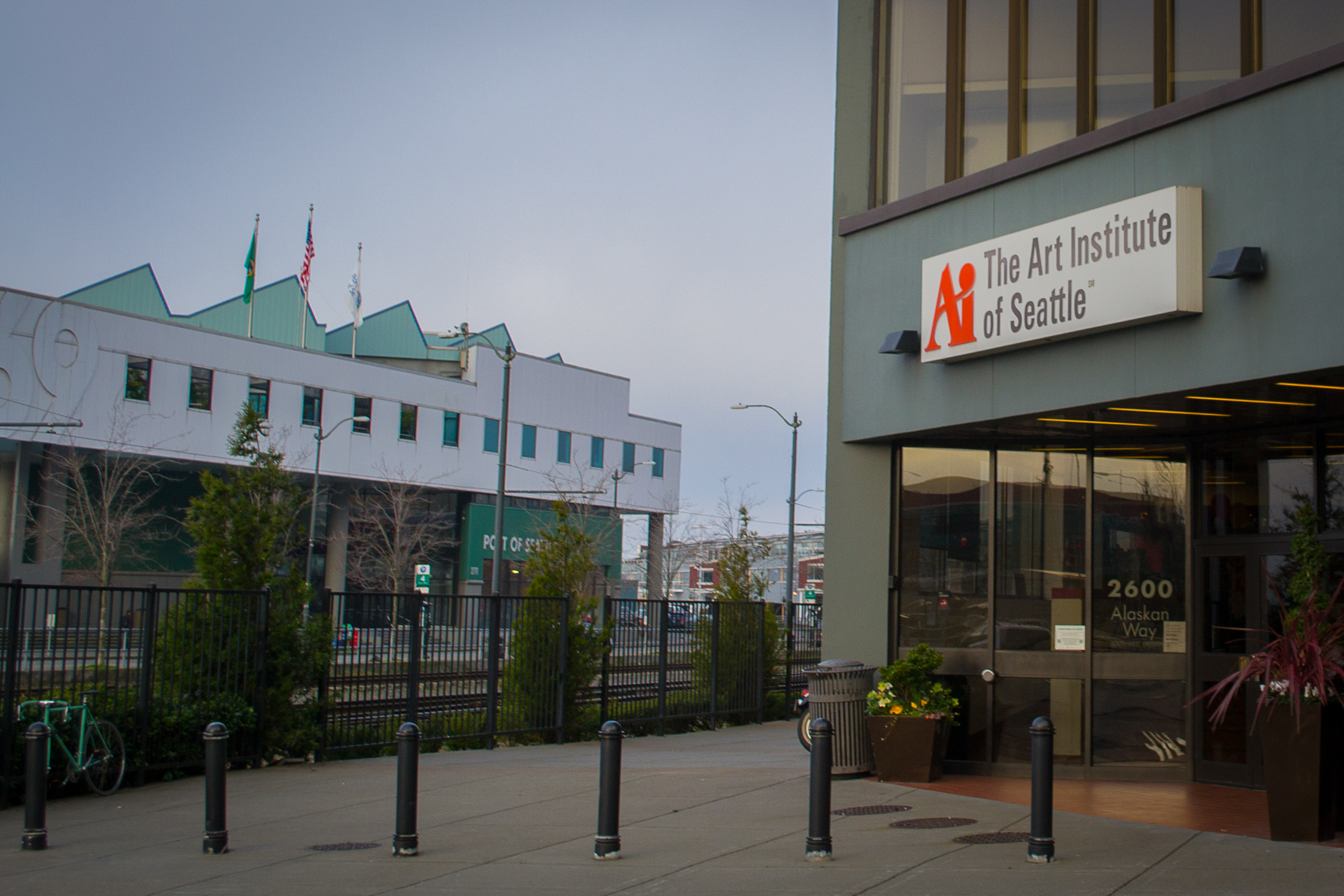
Art Institute of Seattle

Art Institute of Seattle may refer to:

- The Art Institute of Seattle, a for-profit institution offering associate and bachelor's degrees in various fields, which took that name in 1982
- The institution formed in 1917 by the merger of the Seattle Fine Arts Society and the Washington Arts Association, which donated its collection to the Seattle Art Museum in 1933.
