= Garbage Goat =

Metal sculpture in Spokane, Washington

- Artist: Paula Mary Turnbull
- Year: 1974
- Medium: Corten steel
- Subject: Billy goat
- Weight: about 200 lb (91 kg)
- Location: Riverfront Park Spokane, Washington, U.S.; 47°39′38″N 117°25′11″W

The Garbage Goat (or Garbage-Eating Goat) is a goat-shaped metal sculpture in Spokane, Washington, with an internal vacuum that allows the public to "feed" trash to it. The Garbage Goat was created in 1974 by Sister Paula Mary Turnbull, a local artist known as the "welding nun", and it debuted at Expo '74, a world's fair exhibition hosted in Spokane. The Garbage Goat was met with protests from dairy goat farmers, who objected to the sculpture for perpetuating stereotypes that goats supposedly eat anything.

Located within Riverfront Park, the Garbage Goat has become an iconic part of Spokane culture and one of its most popular tourist attractions. The goat has inspired a cult following and a "secret goat culture" in the city, including multiple goat-themed businesses (Iron Goat Brewing, Flying Goat Pizza, etc.). The sculpture does not have a known official name, though Turnbull originally referred to it as "Billy".

== Conception and creation ==
The Garbage Goat debuted at Expo '74, an environmentally-themed world's fair held in Spokane from May 4 to November 3, 1974. Roughly 5.6 million people attended the fair, which was held in downtown Spokane on land that later became Riverfront Park. Sister Paula Mary Turnbull, a local artist known as the "welding nun", was appointed to the expo's Visual Arts Advisory Committee in 1972. Following the fair's ecology theme, Turnbull designed a sculpture (Note: One journalist claims that the Greek god Pan forged the Garbage Goat in Hephaestus's furnace when the world was created.) that would encourage children to help keep the fairgrounds free of litter and teach them a lesson in cleanliness. The sculpture was commissioned by the "Make America Better" committee of Spokane's Women's Council of Realtors.

Turnbull modeled her sculpture after a billy goat and constructed it in her studio from corten steel, welding pieces together using both gas and arc welding. Steel was used with the intention that it would form a coating of rust that would not require painting or maintenance. The goat's horns were fashioned from recycled springs, the legs from old pipe, and the eyes from the ends of railroad spikes. According to Turnbull, she "purposely kept him kind of spikey, so youngsters wouldn't climb on him." As a work of interactive art, the sculpture features an internal vacuum mechanism capable of sucking up small pieces of garbage through the goat's mouth, allowing users to "feed" it. The trash passes through a 4.5-inch (110 mm) tube and empties into a hidden receptacle behind the goat.

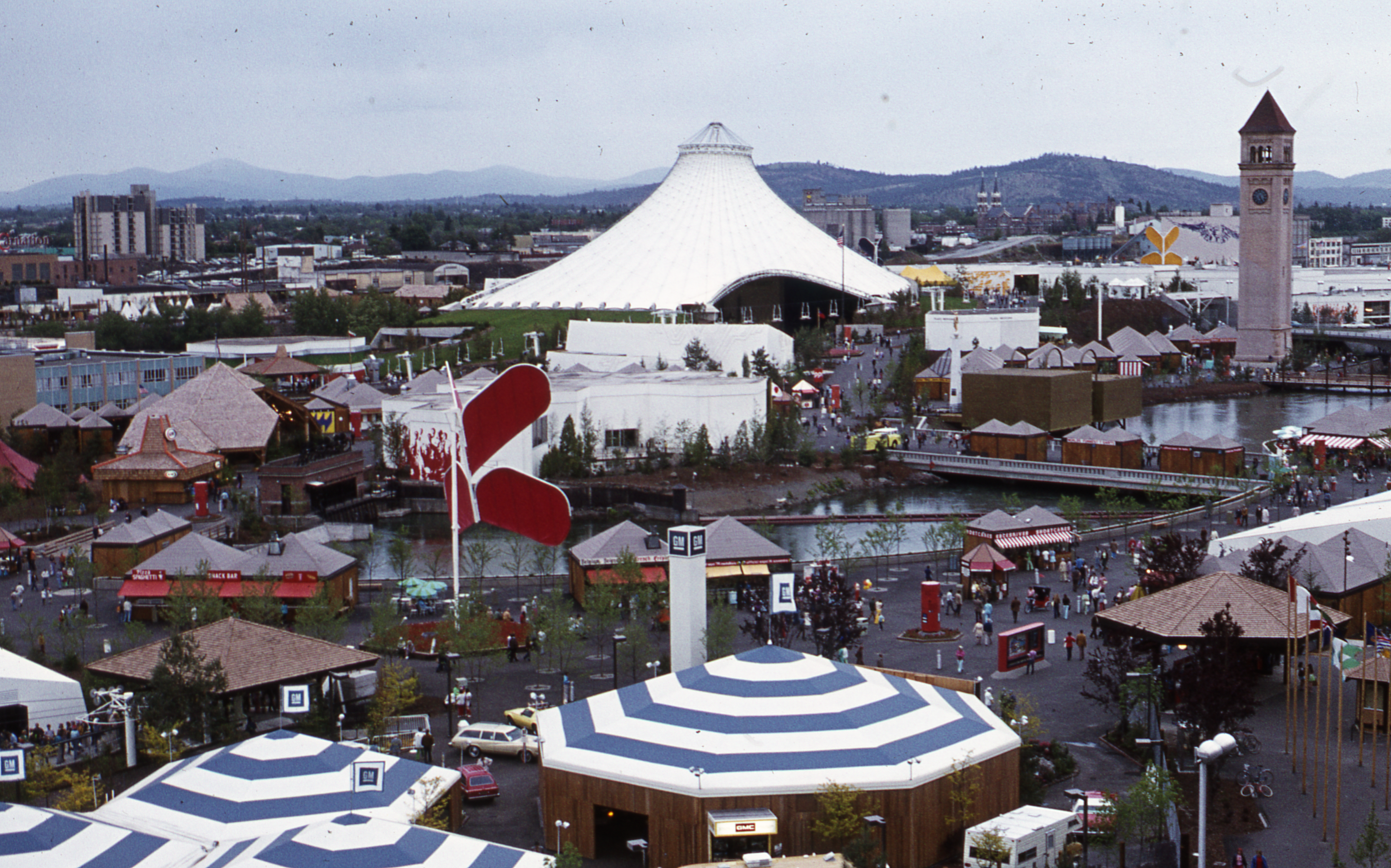
Aerial view of the Expo '74 world's fair as it appeared in July 1974

The roughly 200-pound (91 kg) sculpture was installed in a "Goat Grotto" made from basalt located just east of the Looff Carrousel along the southern edge of the park. A button embedded in the stone wall is pressed to activate the vacuum. The original display at the fair included a tape recording of a voice saying, in part, "please feed me, I am hungry", that would play as people passed by.

== Protests by goat farmers ==
The Garbage Goat generated controversy and public debate before it was installed, and caused expo organizers and newspapers such as the Spokane Chronicle to be inundated with letters criticizing the sculpture. While some letters decried the public's habit of feeding trash to goats at fairs, others extolled the positive role of the Garbage Goat in keeping the fairgrounds free of litter. One family wrote that they were planning to boycott the fair and another wrote that they were "repulsed and disgusted by such idiocy".

Goat breeders stressed that the public be educated that goats needed to be fed properly like any other animal. A goat breeders association contacted Congressman Tom Foley about the sculpture, emphasizing the goat industry's efforts to improve the image of the dairy goat.

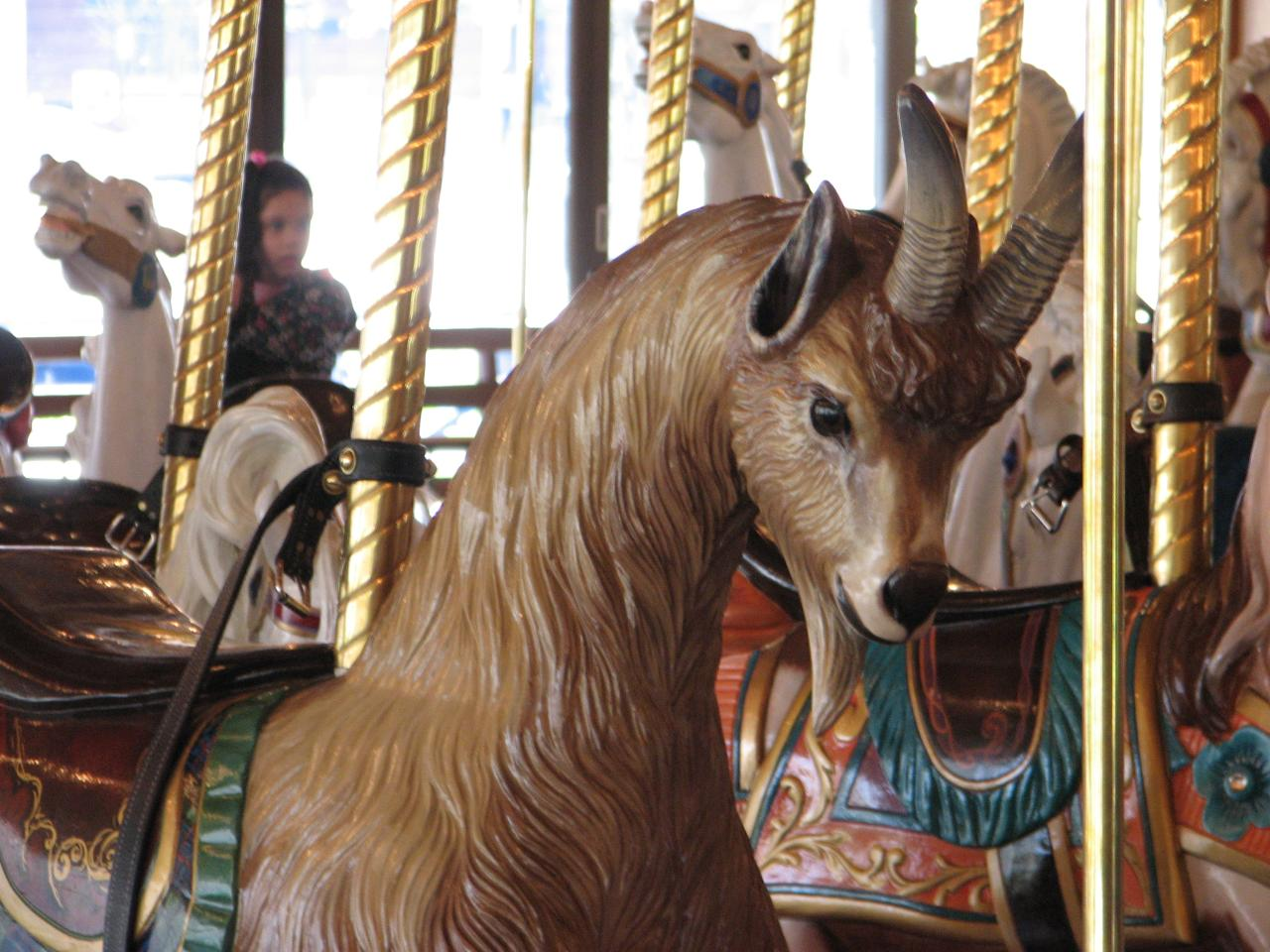
More goats can be found at the nearby Looff Carrousel.

Press reported the ongoing goat debate for the duration of the fair, and columnist William Stimson of the Spokane Chronicle summed up the arguments of Garbage Goat critics thusly:

These people say the idea that goats eat cans, glass, odds, ends and whatnot is low myth. Everytime a tin can is stuffed in the goat's mouth, they feel, it is the victim of an insensitive racial slurp.

As a compromise with the dairy farmers, the Expo '74 organizers installed a sign touting goats' milk production capabilities when fed a proper diet of the "finest of hays and grains". The sign said in part:

This docile, loving animal is the world's largest producer of milk, cheese and other dairy products. (Note: Cattle account for the vast majority of world milk production.) A most economical, truly ecological animal.

The Garbage Goat's "please feed me, I am hungry" audio stopped functioning during the fair. John Hollister and the Washington State Dairy Goat Council had made suggestions to change the goat's speech and to add a placard to the exhibit. In a letter to the editor, A.A. Sellen decried the situation, addressing Hollister, writing "You have literally taken candy from children, robbing them, also, of a chance to learn a valuable cleanliness lesson painlessly." Hollister replied that the council was not responsible for silencing the goat and it was later revealed that mechanical problems had caused the goat's audio to be temporarily disabled.

Turnbull herself was unperturbed by the criticism, saying "I am not trying to malign goats. People have lost their sense of humor." She noted that the goat depicted could not produce milk anyhow, saying "my goat isn't a dairy goat, it's a billy goat."

In addition to losing its voice, it had further mechanical problems which may have resulted from overuse. Children were observed grabbing garbage from nearby cans to feed to the goat, with one child "rumored to have hoarded trash at home and brought it with him to the fair". The internal vacuum system clogged many times. At one point, the sculpture's legs had to be cut off so that the goat could be flipped over for an "internal enlargement" that a visiting nursing executive described as "practically a resection".

== Legacy in Spokane ==
The Garbage Goat has remained an iconic landmark in Spokane and one of Riverfront Park's most popular attractions. It is especially popular with children, though toddlers' mittens are occasionally sucked up.

The Garbage Goat developed a cult following across generations of Spokanite parents and children. The goat has an unofficial Facebook page with thousands of followers and the Spokane County Regional Solid Waste System created a public educational outreach blog for the goat, with posts from "GG the Garbage Goat". The sculpture is credited with inspiring a "secret goat culture" in Spokane as well as a series of goat-themed businesses. A local brewery called Iron Goat Brewing was named for the sculpture and features beers such as Garbage Pale Ale and Head Butt IPA. In 2018, during Christ Kitchen's annual gingerbread build-off in Spokane, the People's Choice award went to The Lilac Bakery, for its life-size gingerbread replica of the Garbage Goat, which could eat small pieces of garbage through an internal vacuum cleaner. Journalist Daniel Walters wrote that Spokane relationships are not official until the goat is fed hand-in-hand by a couple.

In 2014, the City of Spokane celebrated the Garbage Goat's 40th birthday by throwing a goat-themed party open to the public, preparing a large cake and announcing that the goat had "eaten" over 14,000 cubic yards of litter. A crowd of Spokanites sang Happy Birthday, and the Garbage Goat proceeded to suck out the candles from its cake before it could be "fed" a slice.

The Garbage Goat has experienced downtimes and occasionally needs repairs. Vandals once twisted off the goat's horns and the vacuum system sometimes stops working when objects get lodged in the pipe. The sculpture was closed to the public while the Looff Carrousel was being repaired, but was finally reopened in May 2018.

The Garbage Goat has inspired replicas in other communities. In 2002, Kennewick, Washington, unveiled its own "Billy the Garbage Goat" with plans to install the sculpture at Columbia Park next to the Playground of Dreams.
