= Holy Names High School (Oakland, California) =

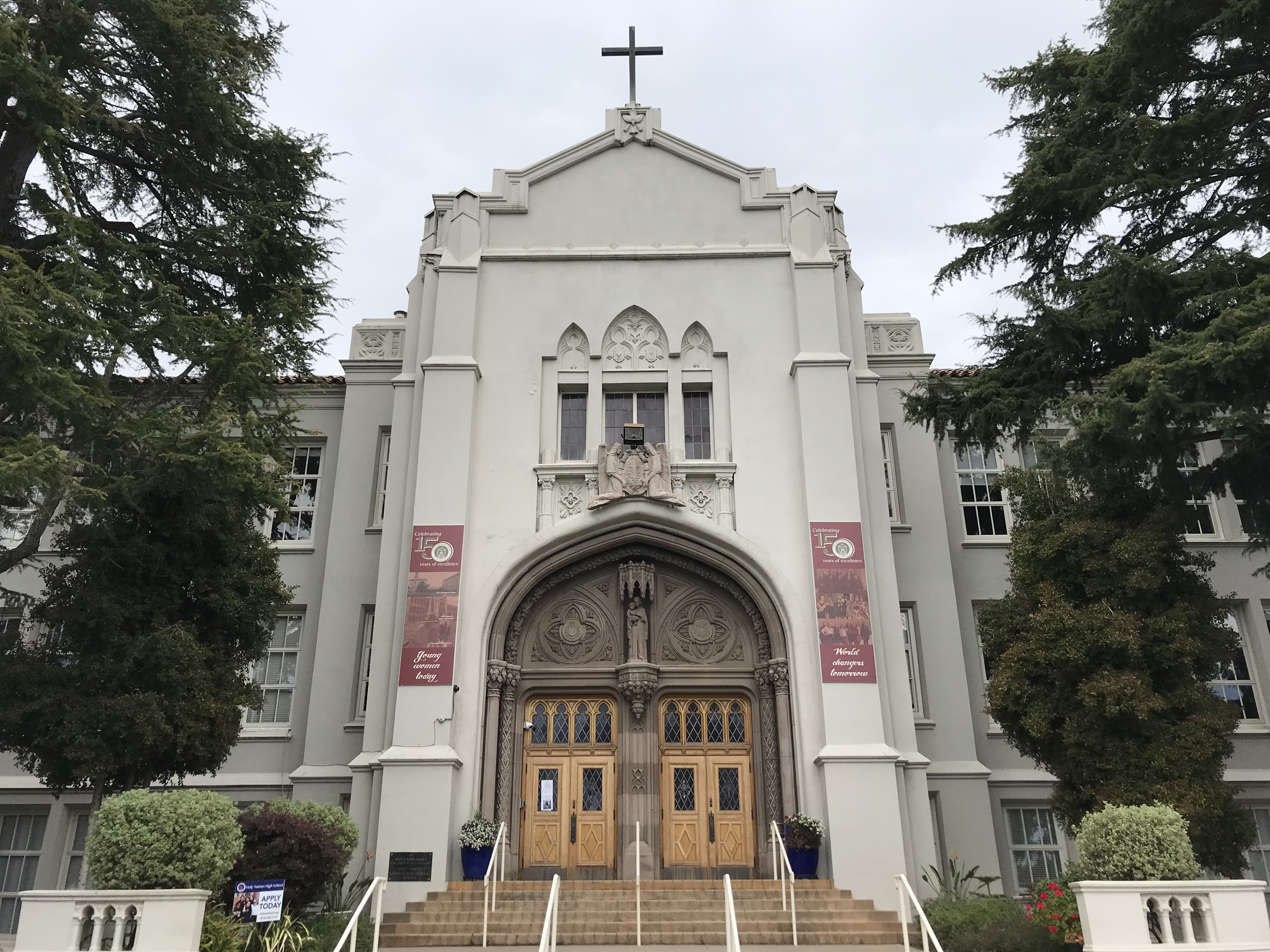

Location
- 4660 Harbord Drive; Oakland, (Alameda County), California 94618; United States
- 37.83926°N 122.231°W

Information
- Type: Private, All-Female
- Motto: Noblesse Oblige (Nobility Obligates)
- Religious affiliation: Roman Catholic
- Patron saint: Marie Rose Durocher
- Established: 1868
- Oversight: Sisters of the Holy Names of Jesus and Mary
- CEEB code: 052200
- President: Constance Hubbard
- Principal: Miles Greene
- Grades: 9-12
- Campus size: 5.78 acres (23,400 m^{2})
- Colors: Red and Blue
- Slogan: Noblesse Oblige
- Song: Holy Names Forever
- Athletics conference: Bayshore Athletic League
- Sports: Cross Country, Golf, Volleyball, Basketball, Soccer, Swimming, Track and Field
- Mascot: Mona the Monarch Lion
- Team name: Monarchs
- Accreditation: Western Association of Schools and Colleges
- Yearbook: Echoes
- Website: hnhsoakland.org

Holy Names High School is a private Catholic girls college preparatory high school located in the Oakland Hills in Oakland, California. It is located in the Roman Catholic Diocese of Oakland. The campus is also home to Aurora Elementary School and the former home to the convent for the Sisters of the Holy Names of Jesus and Mary. Holy Names High School is sponsored by the Sisters of the Holy Names of Jesus and Mary.

== History ==
When established on the shore of Lake Merritt in 1868, Holy Names was the first high school built in Oakland. The school moved to its present 5.78 acres (23,400 m^{2}) campus on Harbord Drive in upper Rockridge in 1931. The school attendance for the first year at its new location, 1931–1932, was 302.

== Academics ==
Holy Names prides itself on its rigorous academic program that meets the standards required for college and university admission and entrance. Teachers often help students refine their academic talents and identify areas that they can strengthen and improve. Students engage in small group and class discussions, actively participating in their own learning. In addition, they can take advantage of highly competitive honors and advanced placement courses as well as the tutorial services offered through a math lab and mentor program. Students are actively encouraged to help each other in their journey of learning and self-realization.

Students are required to take seven classes each year, with classes ranging from such subjects including Vocal Ensemble to Earth Science. Each is recommended to go beyond the minimum required classes needed to graduate in order to pursue the subjects they love. All students are required to take Introduction to Engineering Design (IED), a Project Lead The Way course, their freshman year.

== Accreditation and accolades ==
In 1933, Holy Names High School was included on the list of accredited schools by the California Department of Education. Since then, its accreditation has been consistently renewed. The school is currently accredited for the maximum term by the Western Association of Schools and Colleges (WASC). Holy Names has twice been recognized as an exemplary Blue Ribbon School by the Department of Education.

== Notable alumnae ==
- Joanna Pang, actress, dancer, and teaching artist The Secrets of Isis
- Ileana Matzorkis, Radio Host 98.5 KFOX
- Karrin Allyson, four time Grammy-nominated jazz vocalist and pianist
- Caitlin Flanagan, noted writer and blogger
