= Riverfront Park Carousel =

- Natatorium Carousel
- U.S. National Register of Historic Places
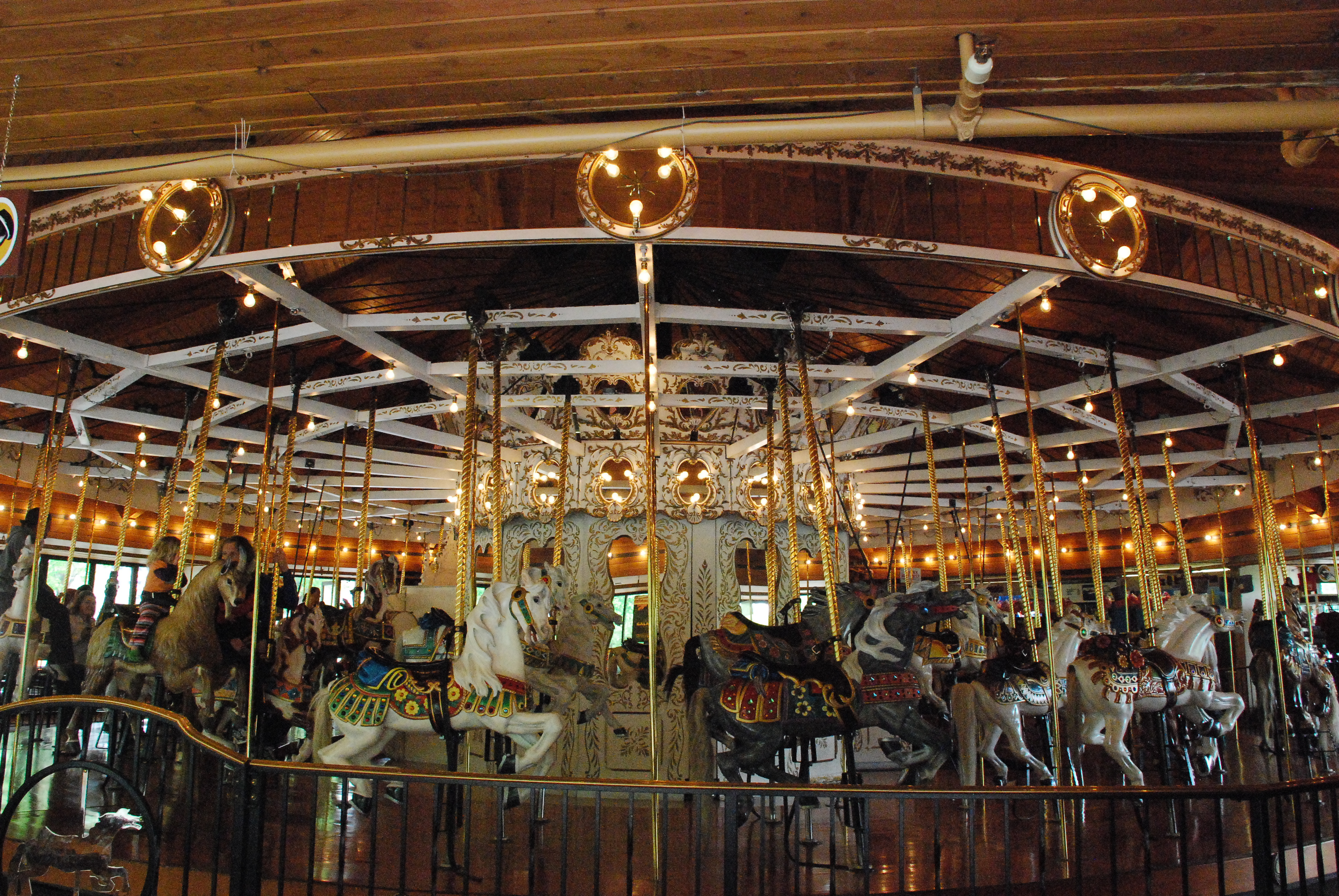

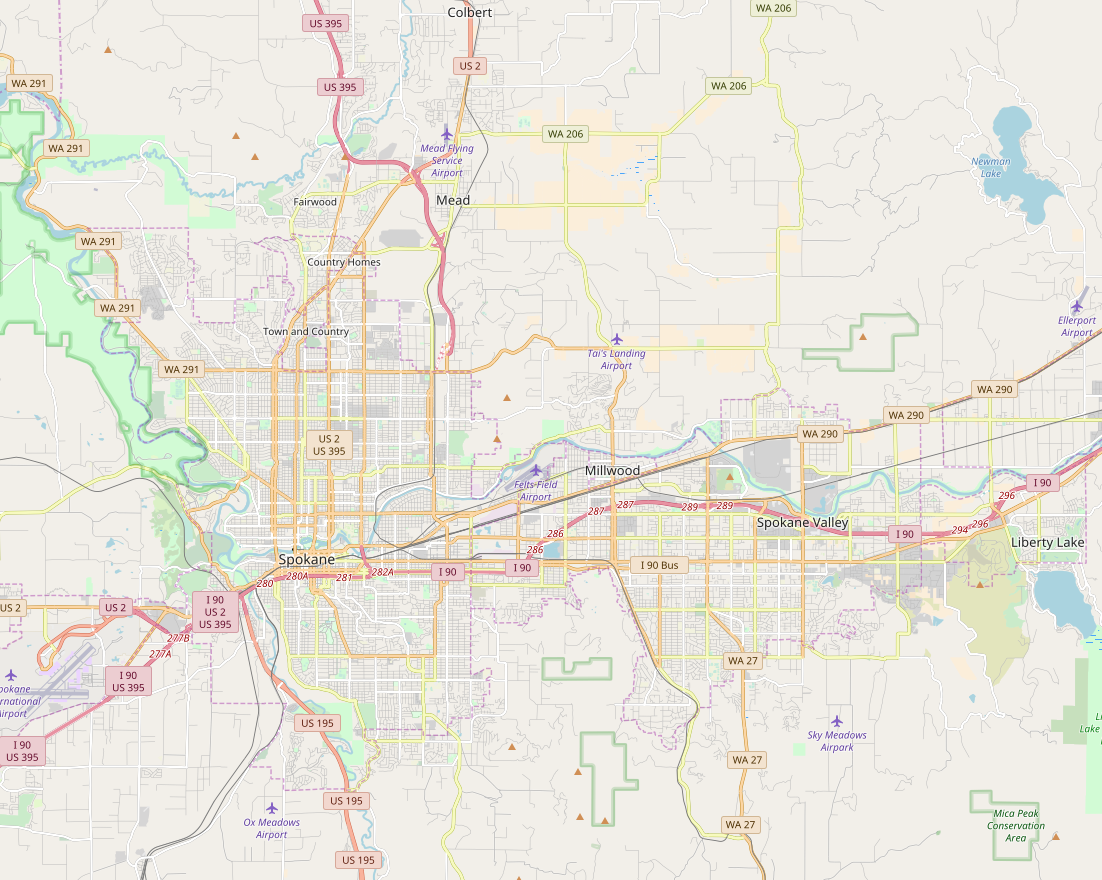
- Location within Spokane riverfront area Location within Greater Spokane area Location within Washington (state)
- Location: Riverfront Park; Spokane, Washington
- Nearest city: Spokane
- Coordinates: 47°39′38.42″N 117°25′12.99″W
- Built: 1909
- Architect: Charles I. D. Looff
- NRHP reference No.: 77001362
- Added to NRHP: September 19, 1977

The Riverfront Park Carousel, also known as the Looff Carrousel and the Natatorium Carousel, is a carousel in Spokane, Washington built in 1909 by Charles I. D. Looff as a gift for Looff's daughter Emma Vogel and her husband Louis Vogel, who owned Natatorium Park in Spokane. It remained at Natatorium Park until 1968 when the park closed. The carousel was then relocated to its present location at Riverfront Park in 1975 where it continues to operate. It was added to the National Register of Historic Places on September 19, 1977.

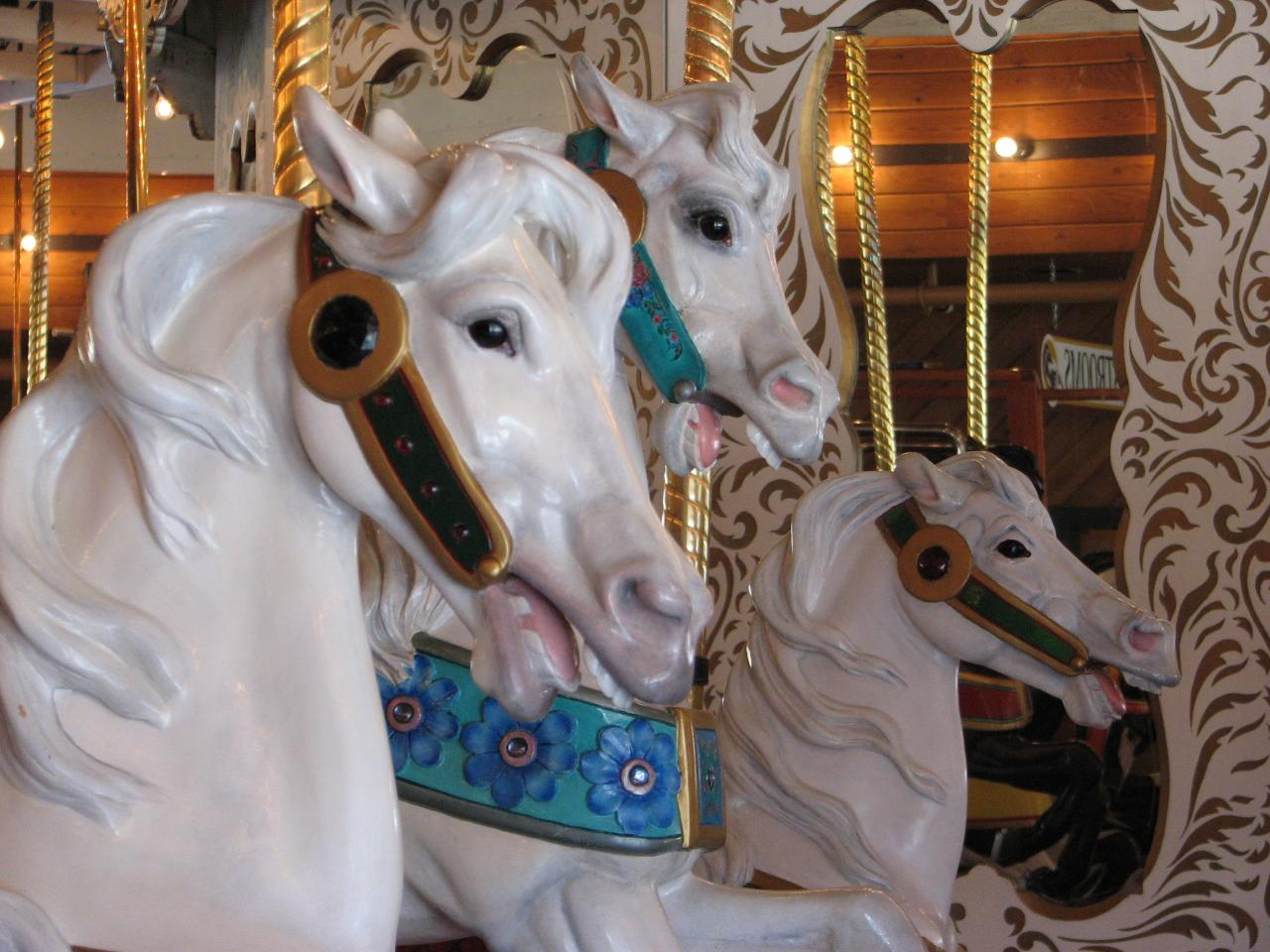
Closeup of some of the hand carved carourel horses

The Looff still contains its original 1900 Ruth & Sohn band organ, which plays 87 key B.A.B. rolls, although due to deteriorating player rolls, a digitized recording is played during the carousel's operation. The organ was manufactured in Waldkirch, Germany and imported by Looff around 1900. The carousel contains 54 horses, one giraffe, one tiger, one goat and two chariots, all hand carved by Looff himself. It also has a ring dispenser, which allows the outside riders to grab a ring during each pass and then toss the ring at a clown with a hole in his mouth. If the rider is successful in capturing the brass ring, they can turn it in to win a free ride on the carousel.

== Current Location ==
Since 1975, the carousel has been located on the south bank of the Spokane River in Riverfront Park. The park was constructed for the Expo '74, and certain structures remained in the park after the fair closed. The building that hosted a German beer garden for the fair became the new home of the carousel in the summer of 1975.

=== 2018 Reopening ===
As a part of a bond passed in 2014 to revitalize Riverfront Park, a new building was designed to house the carousel. The new building was designed, and built by Walker Construction, with more space to queue and host events, and large windows to improve views of the Spokane River from the inside and views of the carousel from the outside. The new space opened in 2018.

== COVID-19 ==
During the COVID-19 pandemic, the Carrousel and other building amenities were closed for nearly a year. The pandemic forced a closure of the attraction on March 17, 2020, but the ride resumed operations on March 1, 2021. During the pandemic, a new ride was added when the local toy and sporting goods store founded in 1946, the White Elephant, decided to close its doors and its beloved white elephant ride that adorned the front entrance for decades was gifted to the city in July 2020. The elephant, known as Isidore, was formerly featured in Natatorium Park alongside the carousel and was reunited with the carousel animals in the Looff building.

== In popular culture ==
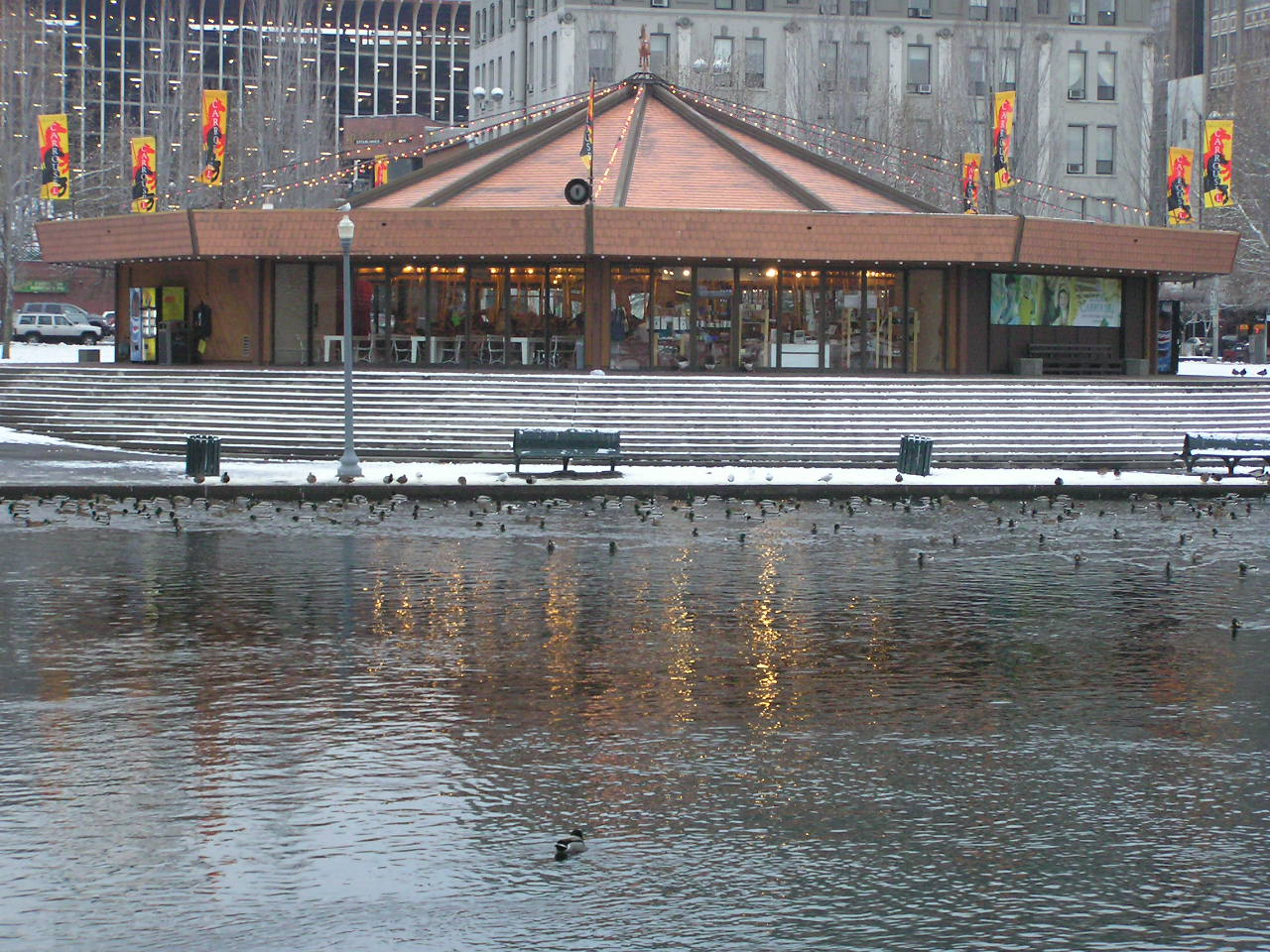
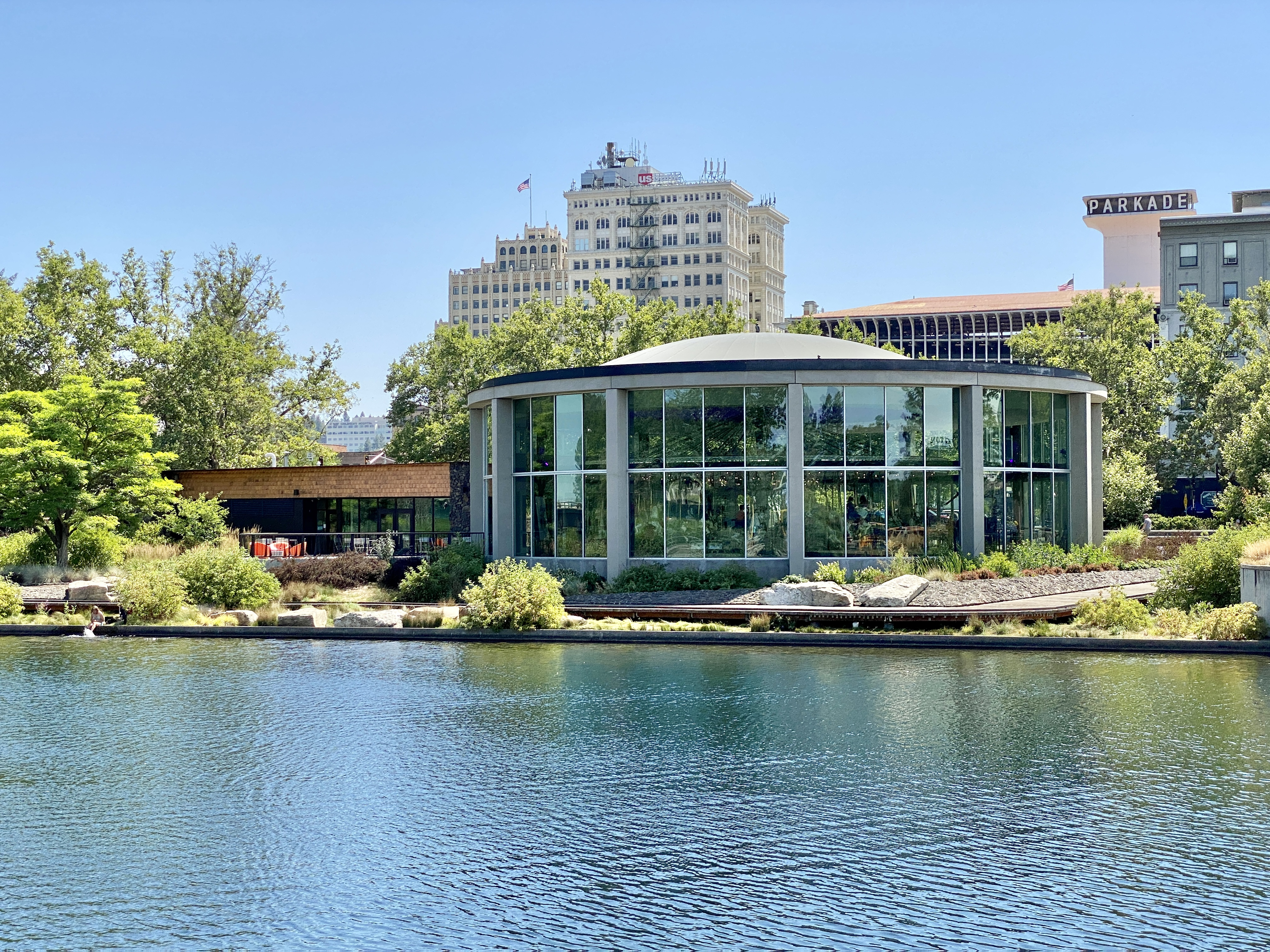
The building that housed the Carousel in Riverfront Park from 1975 to 2016 and the building that currently houses the Carousel.

The TV sitcom Frasier makes reference to the carousel, calling it simply "the Looff", in the season 9 episode "Frasier has Spokane".

== See also ==
- Amusement rides on the National Register of Historic Places
