= John Haag =

American poet (1926–2008)

John Haag (1926–2008) was an American poet and university professor. He spent seven years on the high seas, serving in the United States Merchant Marine during World War II and the United States Navy during the Korean War.

== Background ==
Haag was born in Sandpoint, Idaho. His writing life began inauspiciously in Theodore Roethke's poetry seminar at the University of Washington. Haag recalled handing his teacher a poem and Roethke's reading "as far as the fourth line, which he slashed away with a great green stroke" from his fountain pen. Haag's next attempt went a little better, as Roethke made it halfway through the poem. While still an undergraduate, he began to place poems in reputable national periodicals, including The New Yorker.

His publications brought fellowships. He went to England in 1959–60 as a Fulbright Scholar, studying at Reading University. There his first collection, The Mirrored Man: Twenty-Three Poems, appeared in 1961. In 1962, he played the lead part of Bartleby in a film adaptation of Herman Melville's story "Bartleby, the Scrivener: A Story of Wall-Street."

Returning to the United States with a master's degree, he accepted a position in the English Department at Penn State University. He continued to publish as he taught. His second collection, and his best known, The Brine-Breather, appeared from Kayak Books in 1971. The poems are mostly metaphysical meditations on the curiosities of marine biology, bringing the sea cucumber, queen conch, and others to light. Mariners in their ships he treats with searching, Roethke-like precision and quirky scientific observation.

Haag's later poems reflect the experience of his life. He lived in rural Milesburg, ten miles from the university where he taught. He raised orchids and cultivated mushrooms, and these appeared increasingly in his poems.

His final collection, Stones Don’t Float: Poems Selected and New, appeared in 1996 from Ohio State University Press, having won the Press's Journal Award in Poetry. The volume shows his life's work as he moved from an early formalism to open forms.

== Libros ==
- (1961) The Mirrored Man, Reading, UK: School of Fine Arts
- (1971) The Brine Breather, Santa Cruz: Kayak Books
- (1997) Stones Don’t Float: Poems Selected and New - ISBN 978-0-8142-0717-8

== Personal life ==
Haag was married for ten years, 1957–68, to Jan Haag.
