= The Art Institute of Seattle =

Former for-profit art school as part of The Art Institutes

Coordinates: 47.6120°N 122.3487°W

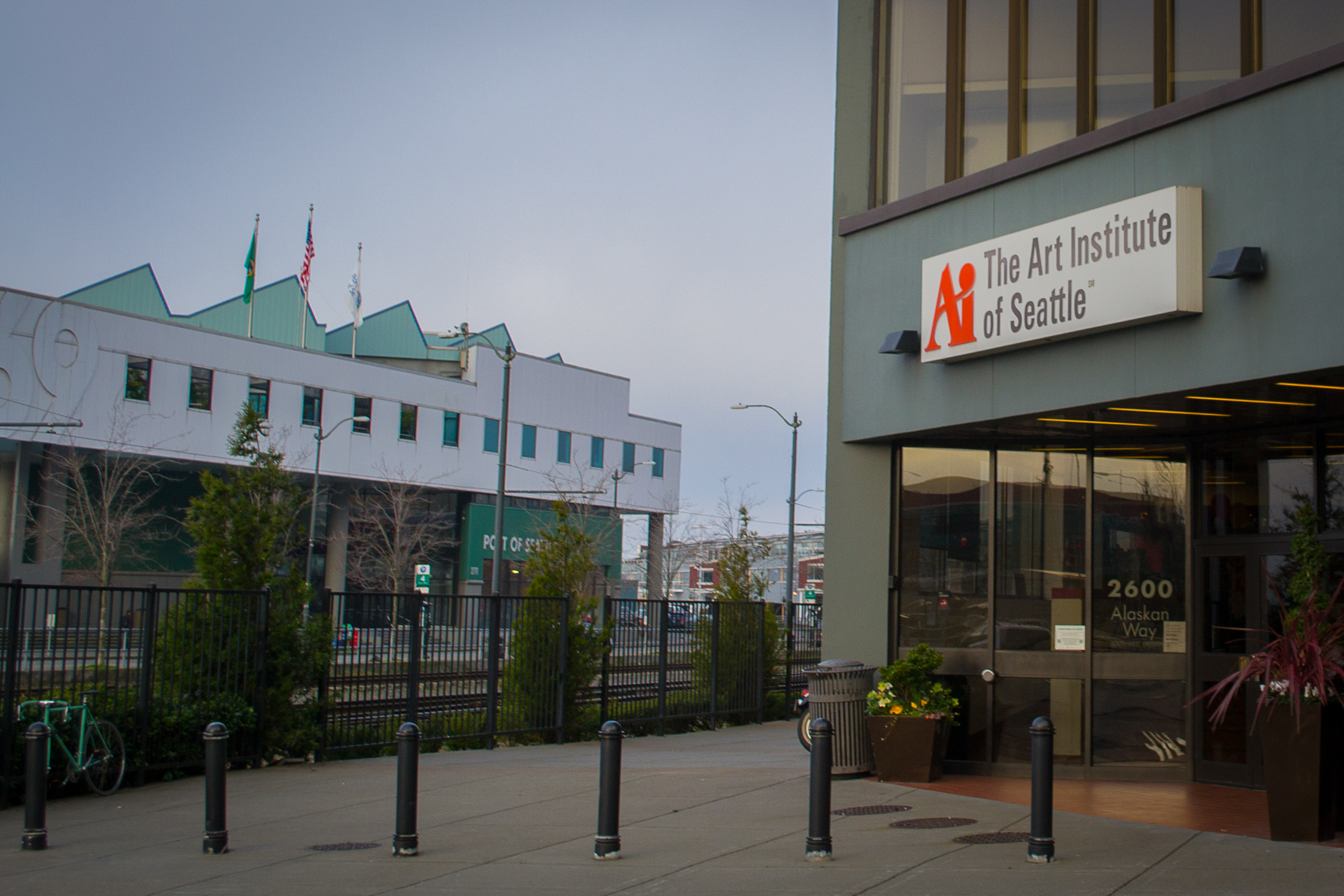
- Other name: AIS
- Type: Private for-profit art school
- Active: 1946–2019
- Parent institution: Dream Center Education Holdings (DCEH), LLC
- Location: Seattle, Washington, United States
- Colors: Black, red, and white
- Website: www.artinstitutes.edu/seattle

The Art Institute of Seattle was a private for-profit art school in Seattle, Washington. The school was one of a number of Art Institutes, a franchise of for-profit art colleges with many branches in North America, owned and operated by Education Management Corporation. EDMC owned the college from 1982 until 2017, when, facing significant financial problems and declining enrollment, the company sold the Art Institute of Seattle, along with 30 other Art Institute schools, to Dream Center Education, a Los Angeles–based Pentecostal organization, before shuttering.

The Dream Center Foundation acquired the school in 2018 and laid off ten of its thirteen full-time teachers in October 2018. The Washington Student Achievement Council then suspended Ai-Seattle's license to operate, which blocked enrollment of new students.

The school closed permanently on March 8, 2019, with 650 students unable to finish the winter quarter. Students were forced to retrieve paper copies of their documents during the last day and were offered scholarships and classes from other nearby universities, including Seattle Pacific University.

== History ==
The Art Institute of Seattle was located in several buildings near the Elliott Bay waterfront in the Belltown neighborhood of Downtown Seattle, near many of the city's design studios, restaurants and corporate offices. It was founded in 1946 as the Burnley School for Art and was renamed in 1982.

In 1946, Edwin Burnley founded the Burnley School of Art and Design and opened the doors at the end of World War II in 1947. In the late 1940s, the Burnley school of Art and Design changed its name to The Burnley School of Professional Art. In 1959, Jess Cauthorn bought the school from Edwin Burnley. The school was run and owned privately by Jess Cauthorn and his wife until 1982 when Jess Cauthorn sold the school to the Education Management Corporation and the school's name became The Art Institute of Seattle. Jess Cauthorn also became the President of the school that year. In 1984, the Accrediting Commission of Career Schools and Colleges of Technology accredited the Art Institute of Seattle. Also in that year, Jess Cauthorn stepped down as the Art Institute of Seattle's president and on May 23, George Pry became the new President of the Art Institute of Seattle. It became part of The Art Institutes and changed its name to The Art Institute of Seattle in 1982. In fall of 1985, the school became fully accredited by the National Association of Trade & Technical Schools; the school also moved from its address at 905 E. Pine to its current location on the waterfront of Seattle at 2323 Elliott Avenue. In 1986, the Art Institute of Seattle was one of eight schools among the Art Institutes. In October 1989, George Pry left the school and Hal Griffith took his place. Hal Griffith was at the school for a period of thirteen months. In November 1990, David Pauldine became the new school President. David Pauldine left in December 1993 and was replaced temporarily by Lew Bender. In February 1994 Less Pritchard became the President of the Art Institute of Seattle. In 1999, Timothy Schutz became President of the school and The Northwest Commission on Colleges and Universities granted regional accreditation to the school. In 2003, Shelly Dubois became president. In 2006, the school was granted accreditation at a baccalaureate level to offer programs leading to the Bachelor of Fine Arts degree. In 2009, Barbara Singer became the President of the Art Institute of Seattle followed by Elden Monday in 2010.

=== Closure ===
Shortly after laying off most of its teaching staff, the Art Institute of Seattle closed suddenly in March, 2019, amid the shuttering of other Art Institutes locations nationwide.

=== Presidents and deans ===
- 1946 – Edwin Burnley (Founder and original owner of the Burnley School of Art and Design)
- 1959 – Jess Cauthorn (Bought school from Burnley, name changed to The Burnley School of Professional Arts)
- 1984 – George Pry (School became the Art Institute of Seattle), Daniel J. Lafferty (Dean of Education)
- 1989 – Hal Griffith (President), Daniel J. Lafferty (Dean of Education)
- 1990 – David Pauldine (President), Daniel J. Lafferty (Dean of Education)
- 1993 – Lew Bender (interim replacement for David), Daniel J. Lafferty (Dean of Education)
- 1994 – Less Pritchard (President), Daniel J. Lafferty (Dean of Education)
- 1999 – Timothy T. Shutz (President), Daniel J. Lafferty (Dean of Education)
- 2003 – Shelly C. Dubois (President), Pamela Goad (Dean of Education)Wayback Machine
- 2009 – Barbara Singer (President), Joan Bouillon (Dean of Academic Affairs)
- 2010 - Elden Monday (President), Scott Carnz (Dean of Education)
- 2018 - Lindsey Morgan (President)

== Notable alumni ==
- Jan Haag (art and painting), founder of the American Film Institute's Directing Workshop for Women, textile artist, and poet
- Gina Mazany (graphic design), professional mixed martial artist
