= Jan Haag =

American filmmaker, artist and writer (1933–2024)

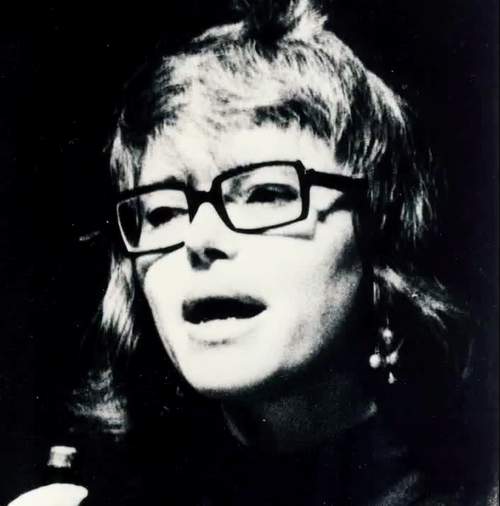
- Haag speaking at USC in 1973
- Born: Jan Marie Smith; December 6, 1933; Marysville, Washington, U.S.
- Died: April 29, 2024 (aged 90); Shoreline, Washington, U.S.
- Occupations: Writer, poet, artist, filmmaker
- Employer(s): American Film Institute, Pennsylvania State University
- Known for: Founder of the Directing Workshop for Women at AFI
- Movement: Feminist
- Website: www.janhaag.com

Jan Marie Haag (née Smith; December 6, 1933 – April 29, 2024) was an American filmmaker, artist and writer who founded the Directing Workshop for Women at the American Film Institute (AFI) and was known for her innovative contemporary needlepoint canvases and poetry.

== Early life ==
Jan Haag (née Smith), born in Marysville, Washington, grew up in the Pacific Northwest, graduated from Seattle's Holy Names Academy, and went on to study art and painting at Burnley School for Professional Art. Haag continued her studies at the Art Institute of Chicago, Reed College in Portland, Oregon, The New School for Social Research in New York, University of Washington, Pennsylvania State University, UCLA, and Southwestern University School of Law. Haag also studied painting with Frederick E. Smith, dance with Eleanor King, and singing and tabla with Ali Akbar Khan and Swapan Chaudhuri.

== Career ==
In Seattle, Haag managed poetry readings, an art gallery, and the Shakespeare Workshop for ABC Bookstore. As an actress, she performed in regional theaters during the 1950s and 1960s, and directed plays in Washington, Oregon and California. Haag has exhibited her work in West Coast museums, competitions, and galleries—including the Seattle Art Museum, the Frye Museum, the Otto Seligman Gallery, and the Woessner Gallery.

In Los Angeles, Haag served as Film and Television Director for the John Tracy Clinic, where she directed a series of forty-two films, "Teaching Speech to the Profoundly Deaf," for the Department of Health, Education, and Welfare. In 1971 she joined the staff of the American Film Institute where, as Director of National Production Programs, she administered the nation's largest film granting program, the Independent Filmmaker Program, funded by the National Endowment for the Arts. In 1974, concerned that though many women acted in major motion pictures, almost none directed them. Jan Haag was determined to remedy this. She helped recruit Joan Didion, Mathilda Krim and other prominent women leaders to found a sustainable program to encourage and train women directors. With funding from the Rockefeller Foundation, she founded AFI's landmark Directing Workshop for Women. Understanding the power of celebrity, she encouraged accomplished women—including Joanne Woodward, Lee Grant, Margot Kidder, Ellen Burstyn, Maya Angelou, Karen Arthur, Anne Bancroft, Dyan Cannon, Julie Phillips, Kathleen Nolan, Cicely Tyson, Brianne Murphy, Nessa Hyams, and Randa Haines to sit in the director’s chair for the first time. This strategy raised the profile of the program and provided the means to support many lesser knowns, with whom Haag was principally concerned, to develop their directing skills. The DWW became the fountainhead back to which the careers of many women, now directing film and television, can be traced. Haag also served on the boards of many film festivals/programs, including the Bellevue Film Festival, Filmex, the Sundance Institute, and the International Women Filmmakers Symposium.

Between 1975 and 2008, Haag created twenty-three contemporary needlepoint canvases, working on some of these simultaneously. One work took ten years to complete. The more complex of these canvases required hundreds, sometimes thousands of hours of application. An accomplished painter and poet familiar with different mediums, Haag writes of the textile art medium: “Compared with the roughhouse immediacy of painting and sculpture, one can cite many a rug, tapestry, piece of stitchery which took a year to make or, at times, a decade. Back and back and back, millennia by millennia, the history and lore of weaving/stitchery recedes as we, at the near end of the time scale, proceed -- cloth, grid arts, fractals and computer -- into the future.”

Haag explained: “Over the years, working on these pieces has become one of my primary ways of understanding both the world and my experience of it. The works… transmit knowledge. Not only the powerful subjective awareness of light and color, but the pleasure associated with study -- in this case, study of music, astronomy, mathematics, travel, archaeology, and the iconographic, mystical and esoteric traditions of many cultures.”

These textile pieces became a life’s work. Through determined experimentation and applying techniques and iconography learned from a lifetime of travel, including treks on foot alone through India, Korea, China, Thailand, Nepal, Russia and Europe, Haag would forever change the perceptions and possibilities of needlepoint. Leonore Tawney admired Haag’s work and despite failing health traveled from New York to visit her exhibition at the Seattle Asian Art Museum.

In 1982, Haag retired from AFI to focus on her art and writing. She wrote thousands of poems and gave poetry readings in theaters, museums, libraries, galleries, and private salons. A limited edition of "Amanita Caesarea", a legend, with original drawings by Roger Landry, was published by Gallery Plus in Los Angeles. Haag wrote stories, novels, plays, film scripts, articles, essays, and a vast journal—the manuscripts of which are on deposit in Special Collections at the Blagg Huey Library of Texas Woman's University in Denton, TX. Haag's travel stories have appeared in four of the prize-winning Traveler's Tales series of books: India, A Woman's World, The Spiritual Gifts of Travel, and Spain. During a 1991 writer's fellowship at the Syvenna Foundation in Texas, Haag wrote a novel Cantalloc. In 1992, during a writer's fellowship at Blue Mountain Center in New York, she completed No Palms, a California/Texas novel centering on water rights, real estate fraud, and murder. After 50 years of research and study, in 2009, Haag published Jocasta, an original play based on the Oedipus myth seen from Jocasta's point of view. Ascesis, a 600-page volume of poetry, was published in 2014.

== Personal life and death ==
Haag was married for ten years, 1957-1968, to John Haag, Professor and Poet-in-Residence at Pennsylvania State University. Haag spent her last years in Shoreline, in the Seattle metropolitan area. She died in Shoreline, Washington, on April 29, 2024, at the age of 90.

== Selected works ==
Poetry and Fiction

- Haag, Jan (2014). Ascesis. Xlibris Corporation. ISBN 9781493170319.
- The 2011 Poems: Lantern Light. 2011.
- The 1996 Poems. 2011.
- Haag, Jan (2006). Companion Spirit. ISBN 9780975442135.

Nonfiction

- "A Wedding in Mahabaleshwar" in Travelers' Tales India, edited by James O'Reilly and Larry Habegger. Travelers' Tales Inc., Inc. 2009. ISBN 9781932361797.
- "There You Are" in Eat Pray Love Made Me Do It, with an introduction by Elizabeth Gilbert. Penguin Publishing Group. 2016. ISBN 9780399576775.
