= Expo '74 =

World's fair held in Spokane

1974 Spokane, Washington
- The Expo '74 logo design, based on the Möbius strip.

Overview
- BIE-class: Specialized exposition
- Name: Expo '74
- Motto: Progress without pollution
- Area: 100 acres (40 ha)
- Visitors: 5,600,000

Participant(s)
- Countries: 10

Location
- Country: United States
- City: Spokane, Washington
- Venue: Present-day Riverfront Park, the legacy site of Expo '74
- Coordinates: 47°39′43.9″N 117°25′8.4″W

Timeline
- Opening: May 4, 1974
- Closure: November 3, 1974

Specialized expositions
- Previous: Expo 71 in Budapest
- Next: Expo '75 in Okinawa

Universal expositions
- Previous: Expo '70 in Osaka
- Next: Seville Expo '92 in Seville

Horticultural expositions
- Previous: Internationale Gartenbauausstellung 73 in Hamburg
- Next: Floralies Internationales de Montréal in Montreal

Simultaneous
- Horticultural (AIPH): Wiener Internationale Gartenschau 74

Expo '74, officially known as the International Exposition on the Environment, Spokane 1974, was a world's fair held May 4, 1974, to November 3, 1974, in Spokane, Washington, in the northwest United States. It was the first environmentally themed world's fair and attended by roughly 5.6 million people. The heart of the fair park grounds was located on Canada Island, Havermale Island, and the adjacent south bank of the Spokane River, comprising present-day Riverfront Park, in the center of the city.

With the exception of two pavilions, all of the major buildings were modular structures assembled on the site. The fair had 5.6 million visitors and was considered a success, nearly breaking even, revitalizing the blighted urban core, and pumping an estimated $150 million into the local economy and surrounding region.

In proclaiming itself the first exposition on an environmental theme, Expo '74 distanced itself from the more techno-centric world's fairs of the 1960s. The environmental theme was promoted in several high-profile events, such as a symposium on United Nations World Environment Day (June 5) attended by more than 1,200 people including many international representatives, and ECAFE Day for the United Nations Economic Council for Asia and the Far East (June 14) that discussed regional environment issues.

== History ==
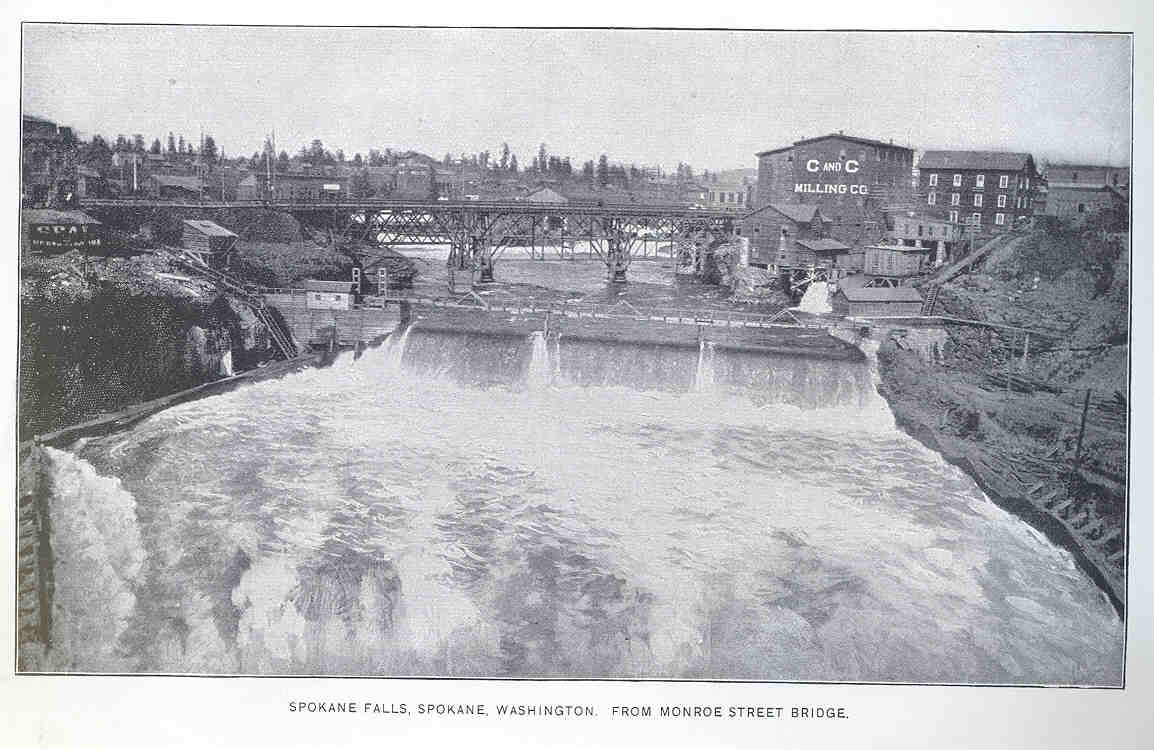
Industrial development along the Spokane Falls in the late 1800s.

=== Industrialization around the Spokane Falls ===
Spokane was initially settled in the late 1800s along the Spokane Falls of the Spokane River, a site which was chosen because of the falls' hydropower potential to support a late 19th century city and its economy. As Spokane began to grow over its early years, the area would become heavily industrialized with numerous sawmills, flour mills, and hydroelectricity generators. Railroading would eventually develop around the falls by the early 20th century.

All of the industrialization would engulf and obscure the area from public access and view. The presence of railroads within the downtown core was noted by the Olmsted Brothers in 1908 when they began to develop a master plan for parks in the City of Spokane. As the brothers were planning in the Spokane River Gorge, they skipped the area that would later become the site of Expo '74, sarcastically noting that it had already been partially "improved" (with all the industrial development that was present) and hoped that the City of Spokane would eventually come to its senses and reclaim the area around the Spokane Falls for a park. Spokane would go on to become the site of four transcontinental railroads: Great Northern, Northern Pacific, Union Pacific, and the Chicago, Milwaukee, St. Paul and Pacific Railroad, as well as regional ones like Oregon Railway. By 1914, Union Pacific had built their own station on the park's site, along with elevated tracks leading up to it. The heart of Downtown Spokane would become a hub for passenger and freight rail transport and remained that way for several decades. By the mid-20th century, the problems of having a large amount of railroads in the middle of the city were beginning to be realized. The elevated railway, warehouses, and other lines leading into the park severely restricted both physical and visual access to the Spokane River and its falls, leading some locals to compare it to the Great Wall of China. Additionally, the high volume of train traffic created a very noisy downtown, and numerous at-grade railroad crossings were causing traffic congestion issues.

=== Beginnings of a world's fair ===
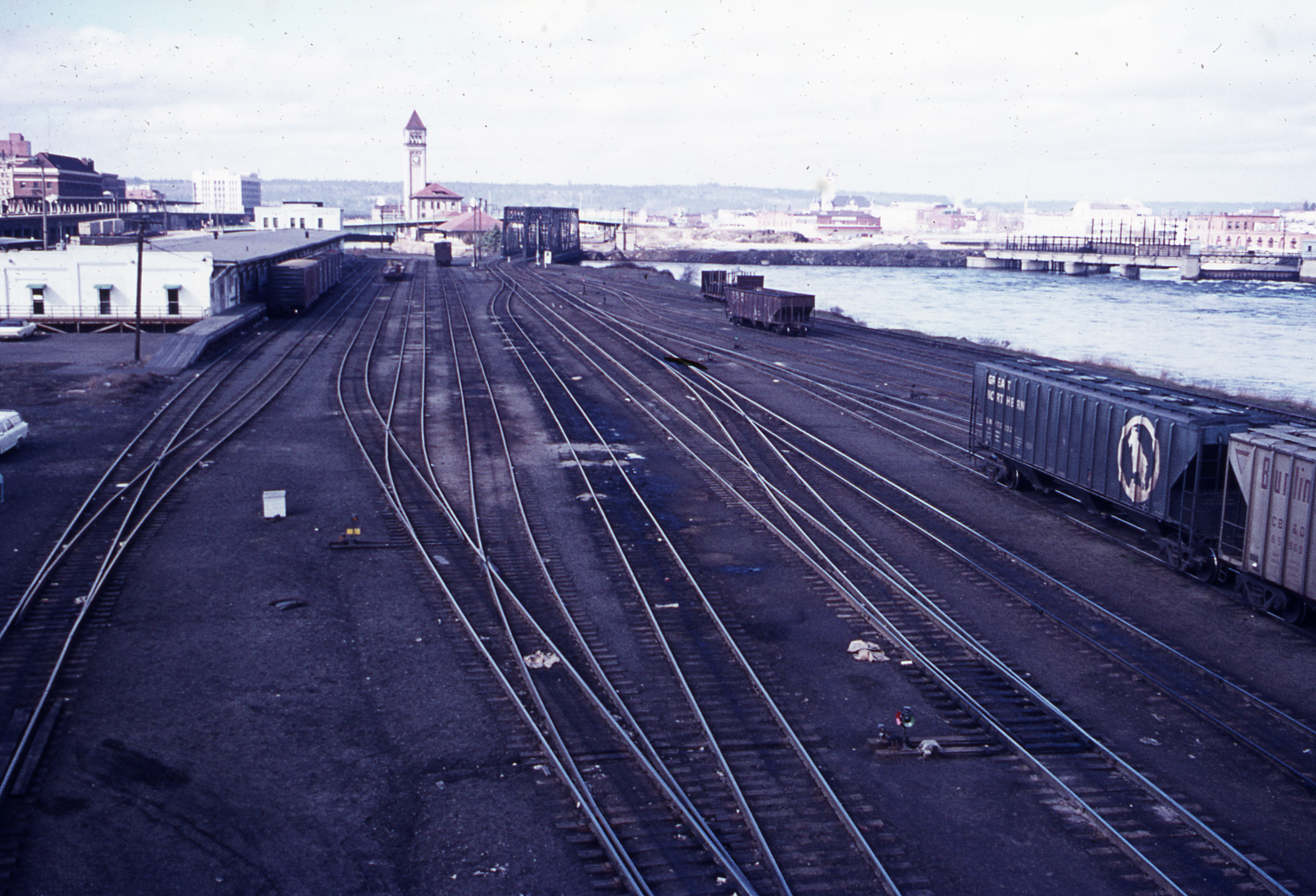
The site of Expo '74, as seen in 1972, was a former railyard.

By the 1950s, the core of Downtown Spokane began to empty out due to suburbanization, a trend that was prevalent amongst many American cities during this time. This trend sparked urban renewal discussions in Spokane and in 1959, a group called Spokane Unlimited was formed by local business leaders to try and revitalize Downtown Spokane. The group would hire New York-based Ebasco Services to create an urban renewal plan, which would be released in 1961 and called for the removal of the numerous train tracks and trestles in downtown and reclaiming the attractiveness of the Spokane River in the central business district.

The plan proposed a timeline that would incrementally renew the area over the next two decades, wrapping up in 1980, and proposed that the effort be funded through bonds, gas-taxes, and urban renewal money from the federal government. One part of the plan, and the first portion to go to voters for approval, would have constructed a new government center. However, efforts to pass bonds to fund the construction were overwhelmingly defeated by Spokane voters over the next couple years, and by 1963, Spokane Unlimited had to revise its vision. They hired King Cole, who had recently worked on some urban renewal projects in California, to execute EBASCO's urban renewal plans in Spokane. In light of the failed votes, Cole formed a grassroots citizen group, called the Associations for a Better Community (ABC), to build community support through the 1960s around the idea of beautifying the riverfront and turning Havermale Island into a park.

With support around beautification growing, Spokane Unlimited would go on to commission a feasibility study in 1970 for using a marquee event, proposed to be in 1973 to celebrate the centennial of Spokane, to fund the beautification. However the report stated that a local event would not have the stature to bring in enough funding for the group's beautification aspirations, and that it needed to go bigger; it suggested that Spokane host an international exposition that could bring in state and federal dollars, as well as tourists from outside Spokane, to fund a riverfront transformation. The idea to host caught on—inquiries were made to the Bureau of International Expositions as well as an additional study that was commissioned in the fall of 1970, and results both came back very positive. The 1974 world expo was identified as the target event.

Efforts to host the expo just three-and-a-half years later began immediately and was a tall order considering that Spokane would be the smallest city at the time to ever host a World's Fair, and that the proposed site had 16 owners, including the railroads. Funding came from local, state, and federal sources, including a new business and occupation tax that the Spokane City Council passed in September 1971 after a ballot bond measure to provide local funding failed the month prior. The event was officially recognized by then-President Richard Nixon in October 1971, and the following month, the Bureau of International Expositions gave their sign-off on the event as well.

=== Construction ===
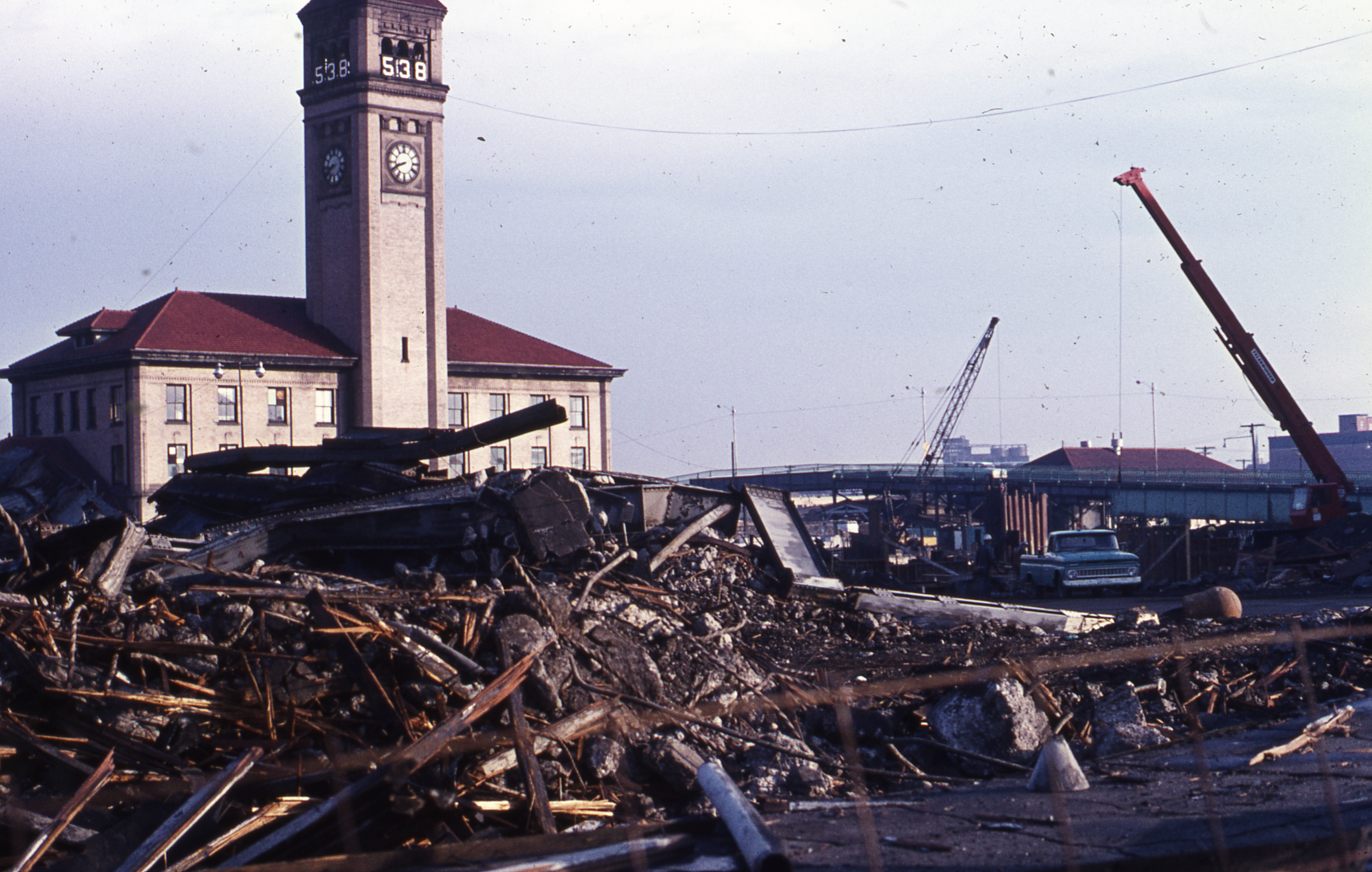
Construction on the Expo '74 site began in 1972 with the removal of existing rail lines and trestles. The "538" on the clock tower was a count down of days until Expo.

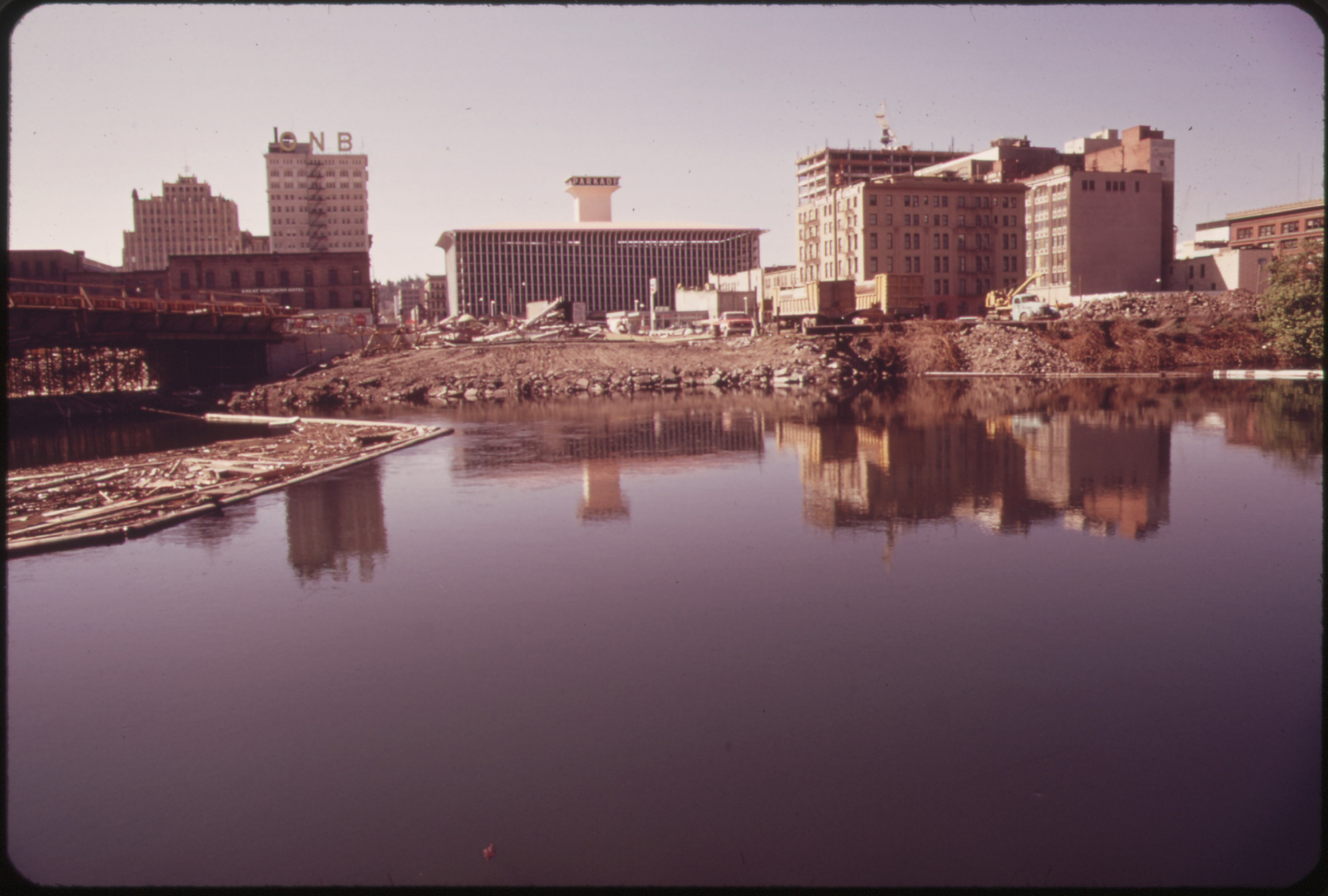
Site of Expo '74 under construction, May 1973

With approvals and funding falling in place, one last challenge was transforming the site and removing the railroads. Through intense negotiations, the Expo '74 planners, including King Cole were able to convince the railroads to agree to a land swap and donate the land needed for the Expo site. The railroads were consolidated onto the Northern Pacific Railway lines further to the south in Downtown Spokane, freeing up the site for construction. Construction that would transform the site to host the environmentally-themed Expo '74 began with the removal of a ceremonial "first spike" at a ground-breaking ceremony on May 8, 1972. The Great Northern depot on Havermale Island and Union Pacific on Spokane Falls Boulevard were both demolished early the following year despite protests from preservationists.

Spokane was the smallest city to host a world's fair recognized by the Bureau International des Expositions until Knoxville, Tennessee held the 1982 World's Fair eight years later (although the Spokane metropolitan area is still smaller than the Knoxville metropolitan area). World's Fairs began at the beginning of the Industrial Revolution as public showcases. Expo '74 was the first fair in decades that did not focus on the space age, futuristic themes, or utopian ideas of living. An environmental theme was decided upon by the organizing committee, but there was some uncertainty about it because it had never been used previously by a World's Fair to that time. After considering several other slogans, such as "How Man Can Live, Work and Play in Harmony With His Environment", Expo '74 settled on "Celebrating Tomorrow's Fresh New Environment."

Uncertainty about the ability of a city the modest size of Spokane to create a successful event caused many nations and corporations to hesitate about making major investments in the fair. Kodak, General Motors, and Ford hosted pavilions at this fair but they were scaled down in size and presence compared to the exhibits constructed for the New York World's Fair ten years earlier. For the first time since the company's beginning, General Electric did not have a fair pavilion but it sponsored the musical group Up with People that performed during the summer at the fair.

=== Logo ===
Expo '74 logo

Expo '74's official logo debuted in March 1972 and was designed by Spokane artist Lloyd L. Carlson. The logo is a stylized Möbius strip, an endless three-dimensional form, which was chosen to symbolize the continuity of life and mankind's relationship with the environment. The three colors, blue, green, and white, also symbolized the environmental theme of the fair.

- Blue was representing the purity of clean water.
- Green representing the unspoiled natural beauty of growing plants and trees.
- White, representing the cleanliness of fresh air.

=== Opening day ===
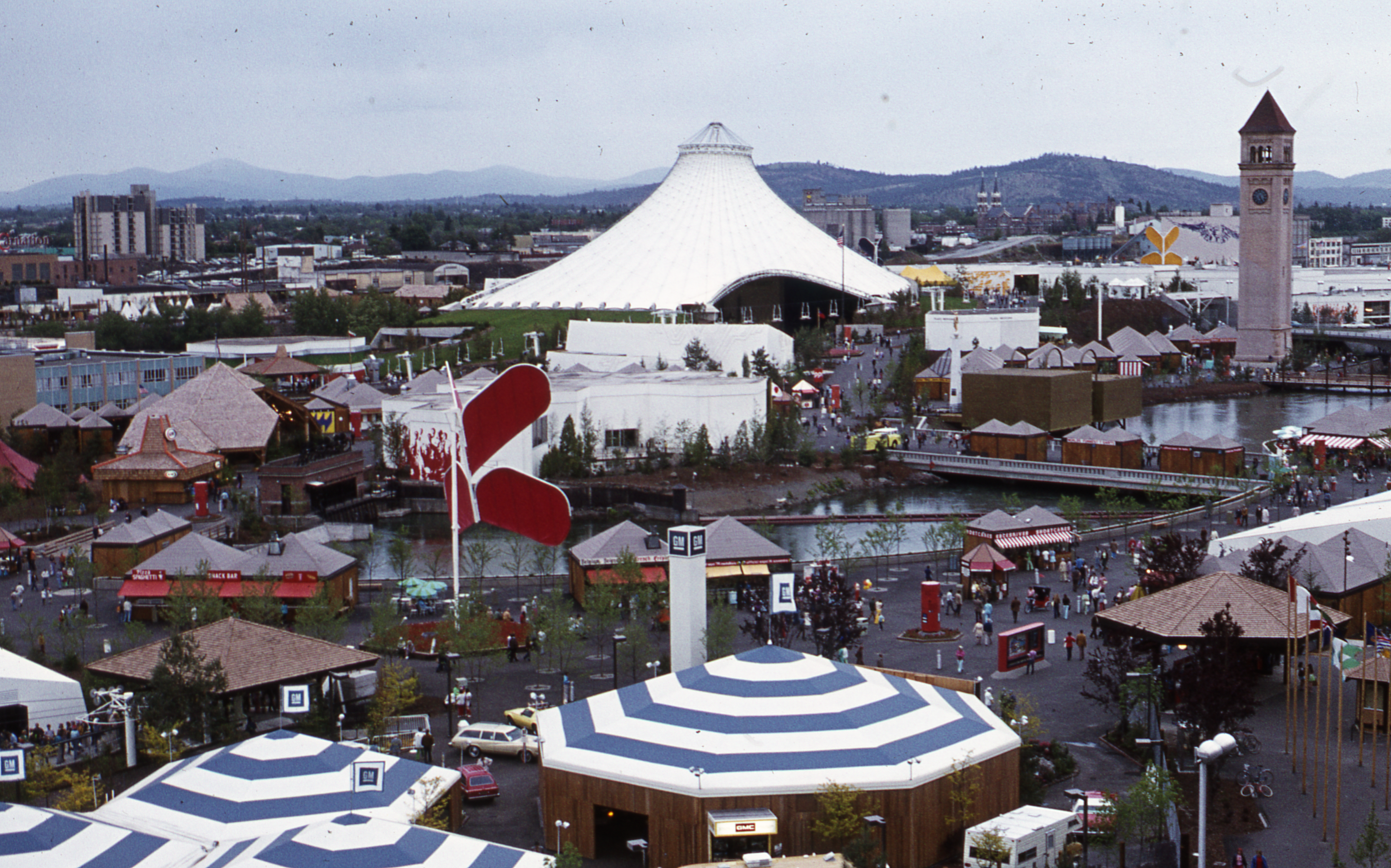
View of the Expo '74 site during the fair.

US President Richard Nixon presided over the fair's opening ceremony on May 4, 1974, where he addressed a crowd of some 85,000. Nixon had high praise of the fair and its environmental theme, noting Washington state's role as the first state in the nation to have environmental protection laws, and urged nations to work together to clean up the environment around the world. The opening of Expo '74 occurred in the midst of the Watergate Scandal investigation, which Nixon was deeply embroiled in, bringing the presence of a number of protestors and hecklers, some of whom shouted "Jail to the Chief!", to Nixon's speech. The hecklers were ignored by Nixon, who continued to give his opening day remarks.

In keeping with the fair's environmental theme, other opening day events included the release of 1,974 rainbow trout into the Spokane River, and releasing 1,000 pigeons into the sky.

=== The fair ===
Man Belongs to the Earth, a short documentary using IMAX technology that debuted at Expo '74

Nations with an official presence at the fair included Australia, Canada, West Germany, Iran, Japan, Republic of China (Taiwan), Republic of Korea, the Philippines, the United States and the USSR.

Architectural critics were intrigued by the Australian Pavilion with its 36 screen revolving audio visual platform and a model of the newly completed Sydney Opera House. The New Yorker called it "by far the most tasteful and well-designed exhibit offered by any nation at Expo 74", and attendance figures reached around 2 million. The artistic director for the project was film director Jonathan Dawson. However, writer Calvin Trillin tartly commented that the exhibits of several other countries seemed designed to demonstrate their nation's lack of environmental care. "While other world's fairs had introduced the telephone, the escalator, and the Belgian waffle, Spokane's Expo '74 would be associated forever with the 'institutionalized mea culpa,'" Trillin wrote in The New Yorker.

One piece of technology that made its debut at Expo '74 was the IMAX movie theater. The original theater, built inside of the United States Pavilion, had a screen that measured 90 by 65 ft (27 by 20 m), completely covering the front wall of the pavilion. It was the largest indoor movie screen at the time and was larger than a typical drive-in theater screen. The quote, "The Earth does not belong to Man, Man belongs to the Earth" (attributed to Chief Seattle) was written in large letters on the outside wall. Inside the pavilion, visitors watched "Man Belongs to the Earth," a 23-minute IMAX film narrated by Chief Dan George and made for Expo by Paramount. Scenes of U.S. splendor led into environmental problems including air pollution in Denver. The film's immersive sense of motion was so realistic—especially during a sequence flying through the Grand Canyon—that motion sickness bags had to be made available.

The fair also featured the interactive movie system Kinoautomat. Pacific Northwest Bell had a pavilion that eliminated the use of air conditioning by using louvered panels on the roof. They demonstrated the use of TTY equipment and discussed the use of 911 for emergency telephone services. Expo '74 was the last time that the Bell system would exhibit at a world's fair before its breakup ten years later.

== Legacy ==
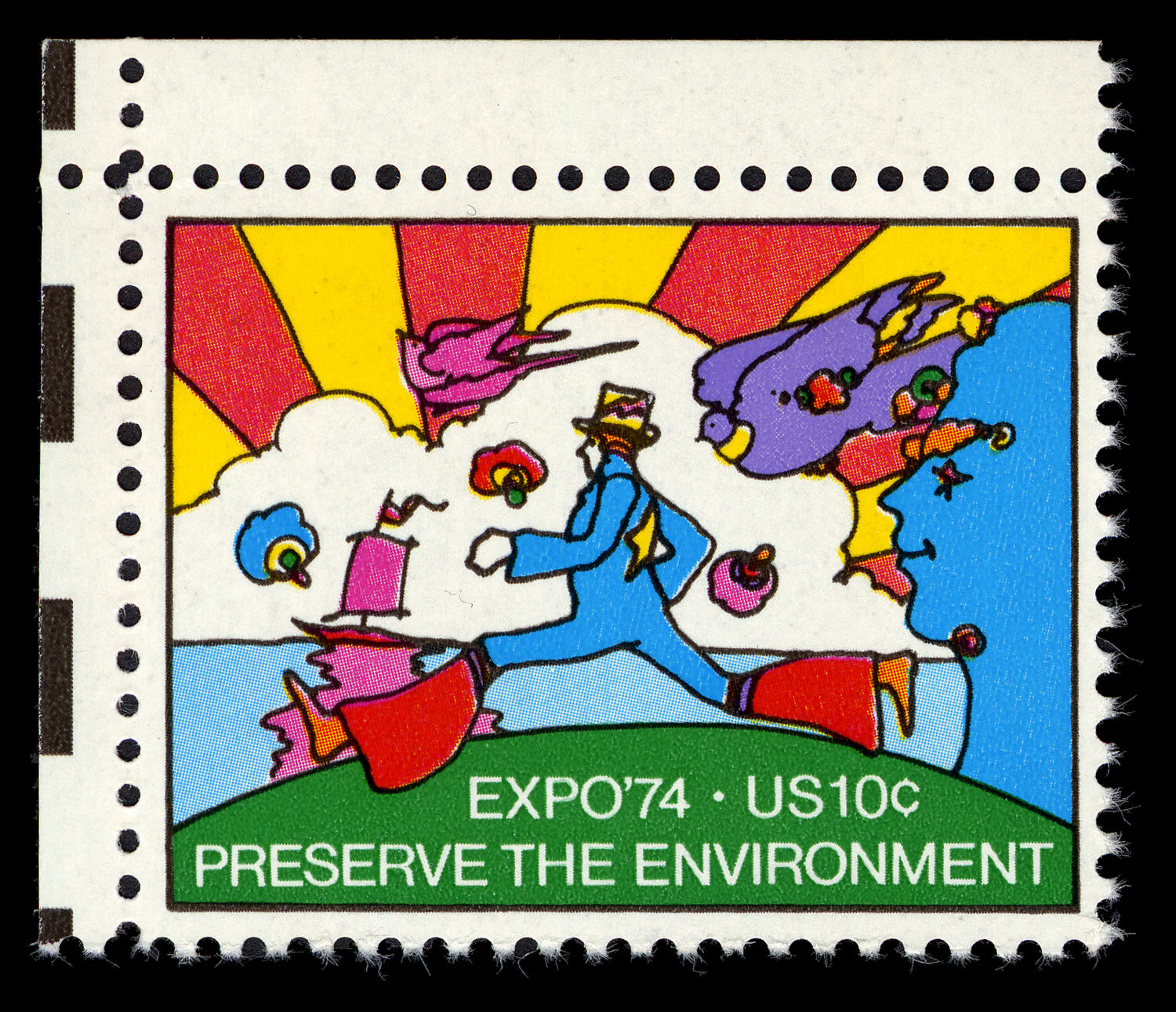
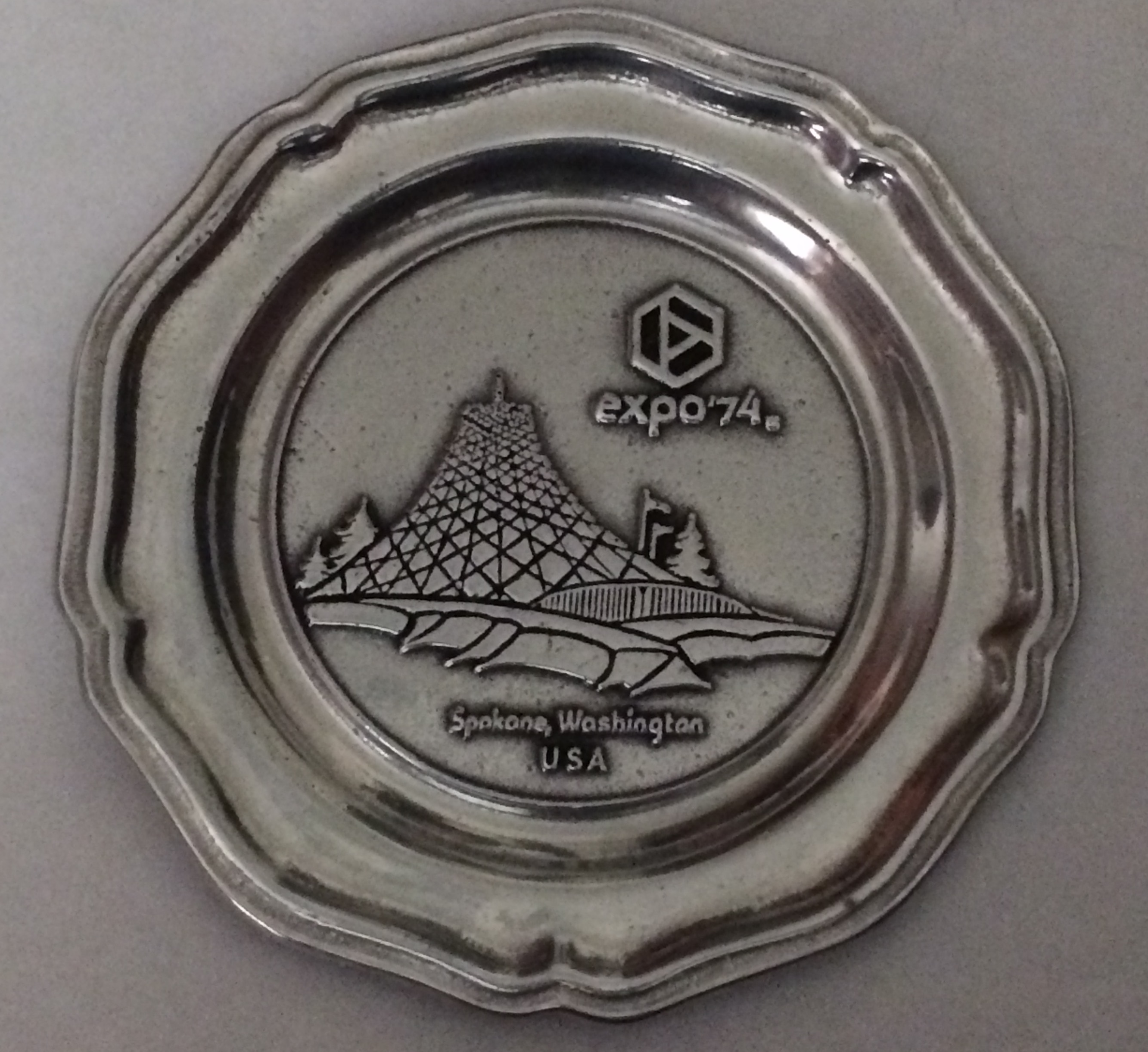
Peter Max-designed U.S. postage stamp commemorating Expo '74 and a souvenir plate

After the event closed, the exposition site became the city's 100-acre (40 ha) Riverfront Park, containing the former U.S. Pavilion and a clock tower (part of a Great Northern rail depot that was demolished for Expo '74), which are featured prominently in the park's past and current logos.

Several structures built for the fair are still standing. The Washington State Pavilion still stands and is used as the Spokane Convention Center and the First Interstate Center for the Arts. The building constructed to house Spokane's iconic Looff Carrousel was disassembled in March 2017 (it housed a German beer garden during the fair), with a new building planned. The carrousel originated in Natatorium Park, which closed in 1967, and was restored for the World's Fair. An additional six structures, including the Republic of China Pavilion, were moved 150 miles south to Walla Walla where they were re-purposed to be used as classrooms and a performing arts theater for the Walla Walla Community College. Several sculptures created for the fair remain at Riverfront Park, including the Garbage Goat designed by the "welding nun" Paula Mary Turnbull.

The original covering of the US pavilion was a thick vinyl sheeting that was not designed to last. It was allowed to remain until it began to deteriorate, become unsightly and was thought a safety hazard. When the city opted to remove the covering, chunks of the thick vinyl could be purchased as keep-sakes. The tent design itself with its heavy cables was not intended to stay up, however the people of Spokane voiced the opinion that it should remain as a unique architectural statement, and a monument to the 1974 exposition.

As with other expositions, numerous souvenirs were produced and sold both at the site and for years afterwards.

== Entertainment and performances ==
=== Australia ===
Australia held a "national day" on September 24 with Helen Reddy singing the national anthem. Entertainer Rolf Harris was accompanied by the Wallis Sisters singing a song about the environment, and master didgeridoo player David Blanasi accompanied Harris in a performance, along with country singers Judy Stone and Ross Ryan. Other performers included Australian operatic tenor Donald Smith, actor and entertainer Barry Crocker, stockwhip champions John and Vi Brady, ballet dancer Lucette Aldous, and singer-songwriters Brian Cadd and Kerrie Biddell. Helen Reddy and Rolf Harris also gave separate concerts in the Spokane Opera House.

=== Other performers ===
- Cheremosh Ukrainian Dance Company
- Bob Hope
- Emmett Kelly Jr. Circus

== See also ==
- Expo '74, special Amtrak service between Spokane and Seattle
- List of world expositions
- List of world's fairs
