= Marie Rose Durocher =

Canadian Religious Sister and foundress beatified by the Catholic Church (1811–1849)

Blessed Marie-Rose Durocher SNJM
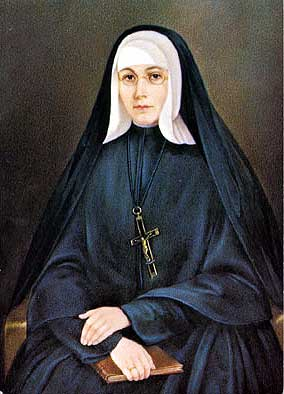
- Born: 6 October 1811; Saint-Antoine-sur-Richelieu, Lower Canada, British Empire
- Died: 6 October 1849 (aged 38); Longueuil, Province of Canada, British Empire
- Venerated in: Roman Catholic Church (Canada and the United States)
- Beatified: 23 May 1982, Rome, Italy by Pope John Paul II
- Major shrine: Chapelle Marie-Rose; Co-cathedral of St. Anthony of Padua in Longueuil, Quebec, Canada
- Feast: October 6

Marie-Rose Durocher, SNJM (born Eulalie Mélanie Durocher; 6 October 1811 – 6 October 1849) was a Canadian Catholic religious sister who co-founded the Sisters of the Holy Names of Jesus and Mary. She was beatified in 1982.

== Early life ==
She was born Eulalie Mélanie Durocher in the village of Saint-Antoine-sur-Richelieu, Quebec, on 6 October 1811. She was the tenth of eleven children born to Olivier and Geneviève Durocher, a prosperous farming family. Three of her siblings died in infancy. Her brothers Flavien, Théophile, and Eusèbe entered the Roman Catholic priesthood, and her sister Séraphine joined the Congregation of Notre Dame.

Durocher was home-schooled by her paternal grandfather Olivier Durocher until the age of 10. Upon his death in 1821, she became a boarding pupil at a convent run by the Congregation of Notre Dame in Saint-Denis-sur-Richelieu until 1823, where she made her First Communion aged 12. After leaving the convent she returned home to be privately tutored by Jean-Marie-Ignace Archambault, a teacher at the Collège de Saint-Hyacinthe. During this time she owned a horse named Caesar and became a competent equestrian.

In 1827, aged 16, Durocher entered the boarding school of the Congregation of Notre Dame in Montreal in 1827, where she intended to enter the novitiate as her sister Séraphine had earlier done. However, her health proved too poor to allow her to complete her education there and after two years she returned home. A contemporary of Durocher's from her time at boarding school later wrote:

"[Durocher] was wonderful; she alone was unaware of her own worth, attributing all to God that was found favourable in her, and asserting that of herself she was only weakness and misery. She possessed charming modesty, was gentle and amiable; attentive always to the voice of her teachers, she was still more so to the voice of God, who spoke to her heart."

In 1830, Durocher's mother Geneviève died, and Durocher assumed her mother's role as homemaker. In 1831, Durocher's brother Theophile, who at that time was curate of Saint-Mathieu Parish in Belœil, persuaded his father and Durocher to move from the family farm to the presbytery of his parish. At the presbytery, Durocher worked as housekeeper and secretary to Theophile between 1831 and 1843. During the course of this work she was made aware of the severe shortage of schools and teachers in the surrounding countryside (in 1835 Quebec was home to only 15 schools) and discussed with her family and acquaintances the need for a religious community specifically dedicated to the education of children both rich and poor.

== Foundress ==
In 1841, Louis-Moïse Brassard, parish priest of Longueuil, entered discussions with Charles-Joseph-Eugène de Mazenod, Bishop of Marseille, France, for the establishment of a mission to Quebec by a French religious congregation known as the Sœurs des Saints-Noms de Jésus et de Marie. Durocher learned of the proposed mission through Brassard. Along with her friend Mélodie Dufresne, Durocher applied in advance to join the novitiate of the new congregation upon its arrival in Canada. However, the mission ultimately did not go ahead, and Mazenod instead advised Ignace Bourget, Bishop of Montreal, whom Mazenod had met during Bourget's European visit of that year, to establish a similar congregation in Canada, based upon the two women who had been eager to be part of the French group.

On 2 December 1841, a mission of the Oblate Fathers arrived in Montreal, and in August 1842 opened a church at Longueuil. Among the Oblates was a Father Pierre-Adrien Telmon, who travelled to Belœil to conduct popular missions, where he met Durocher and became her spiritual director. On 6 October 1843, Durocher traveled to Longueuil to witness her brother Eusèbe profess his religious vows, and there she met Bishop Bourget. Together, Bourget and Telmon petitioned Durocher to take a leading role in the foundation of a new religious congregation dedicated to the Christian education of youth. Durocher agreed to this request, and on 28 October 1843, Durocher began her postulancy at Saint-Antoine Church in Longueuil under the direction of Father Jean-Marie François Allard, a member of the Oblates. Two companions entered training alongside her: Durocher's friend Mélodie Dufresne, and Henriette Céré, a schoolteacher of Longueuil at whose school building Durocher and Dufresne roomed during their postulancy.

On 28 February 1844, in a ceremony conducted by Bishop Bourget, the three postulants began their novitiate, assumed the religious habit and received their religious names. Durocher took the name Sister Marie-Rose, Dufresne became Sister Marie-Agnes and Céré became known as Sister Marie-Madeleine. Bishop Bourget gave the newly founded community diocesan approval and named it the Sisters of the Holy Names of Jesus and Mary, after the French community Durocher had hoped to join. The sisters adopted the rule and constitutions of their French namesakes, as well as a modified version of their habit. On 8 December 1844, Durocher, Dufresne, and Céré professed religious vows in the church at Longueuil. Bourget named Durocher as mother superior, mistress of novices, and depositary of the new congregation.

The new congregation began teaching out of Henriette Céré's schoolhouse, but demand for their services was extraordinary and on 4 August 1844 they were forced to move to larger premises. The number of prospective pupils continued to rise over the following years, with the result that between February 1844 and October 1849 the sisters established four convents (in Longueuil, Belœil, Saint-Lin and Saint Timothée) employing 30 teachers and enrolling (as of 6 October 1849) 448 pupils. The sisters developed a course of study that provided equally for English and French pupils. Originally the sisters had planned to teach only girls but their missionary requirements eventually forced them to teach boys in some provinces.

On 17 March 1845, the sisters were incorporated by an act of the Parliament of the Province of Canada. During 1846, Durocher clashed with Charles Chiniquy, an outspoken priest who would eventually leave the Roman Catholic Church and become a Protestant. Chiniquy wished to take control of teaching in the sisters' schools, and when he was blocked in this aim by Durocher, he publicly disparaged the sisters.

== Death and beatification ==
Durocher, troubled throughout her life by ill health, died of a "wasting illness" on 6 October 1849, aged 38. Her funeral was held the same day in the church of Longueuil, with Bishop Ignace Bourget presiding. Since 1 May 2004, Durocher's remains have been interred in the Chapelle Marie-Rose in the right transept of the Co-cathedral of St. Anthony of Padua in Longueuil.

In a statement made in 1880, Bishop Ignace Bourget called for Durocher's canonization, saying: "I invoke her aid as a saint for myself, and I hope that the Lord will glorify her before men by having the church award her the honours of the altar." On 9 November 1927, Alphonse-Emmanuel Deschamps, Auxiliary Bishop of Montreal, appointed an ecclesiastical tribunal to enquire into the possible canonisation of Durocher. The tribunal was empowered by ecclesiastical mandate to collect anything written by Durocher, and called upon Roman Catholics of Montreal to produce any privately held documents in accordance with that mandate. The evidence gathered by the tribunal was collected in a positio, which was then taken to Rome for presentation to the Congregation for the Causes of Saints. Theologians approved her writings on 22 January 1933.

On 2 October 1972 the cause for her beatification was officially introduced by Pope Paul VI, bestowing upon Durocher the title of "Servant of God". On 13 July 1979 a declaration was made with respect to Durocher's heroic virtues, resulting in Durocher receiving the title "Venerable". On 23 May 1982 she was beatified by decree of Pope John Paul II. The decree was made before a crowd in St Peter's Square in Rome. Beatification is the third of four steps on the path to Roman Catholic sainthood, and bestows the title of "Blessed" upon Durocher. Durocher's feast day is celebrated on 6 October.

Several alleged miracles have been posthumously connected with Durocher. In 1946, a Detroit man, Benjamin Modzell, was crushed against a wall by a truck and pronounced dead. He was reported to recover after prayers were made invoking Durocher. This incident was the primary miracle upon which Durocher's beatification was based.

In 1973, sisters at their Spokane, Washington, convent claimed to have a stopped a fire at a chapel in Fort Wright College by invoking Durocher through prayer. The fire, which started in Spokane River gorge, was approaching the campus when the sisters tacked Durocher's picture to trees and prayed to her for help. Flames were reportedly within 15 feet of the chapel, with smoke filling the interior, when the fire changed direction. Similarly, in 1979, Frank Carr, the owner of a lake resort in Tonasket, Washington, observed an uncontrolled wildfire change direction after he tossed a picture of Durocher into the flames. Said Carr, "All I know is that we threw in the picture and the wind changed. There's no question the fire would have taken the orchard, some farm houses and the resort if it hadn't turned."

Durocher is commemorated in a stained glass window in Mary, Queen of the World Cathedral in Montreal, where she is depicted alongside Frances Xavier Cabrini and Andre Bessette. The College Durocher St Lambert, Quebec, is named after Durocher, as is the Eulalie Durocher High School in Montreal. Durocher Hall at Holy Names University Oakland, California, is one building named in her honor, as is Durocher Pavilion on the grounds of St. Cecilia Parish in San Francisco.
