= Holy Names University =

Catholic university in Oakland, California, US (1868–2023)

- Former names: Convent of Our Lady of the Sacred Heart (1868–1908); College of Holy Names (1908–1971); Holy Names College (1971–2004)
- Motto: Honor. Nobilitas. Virtus.
- Motto in English: Honor, Nobility, Virtue.
- Type: Private university
- Active: 1868–2023
- Religious affiliation: Roman Catholic (Sisters of the Holy Names of Jesus and Mary)
- Academic affiliations: ACCU; CIC
- Endowment: $55.4 million (2020)
- President: Carol Sellman
- Faculty: 217
- Students: 2,174
- Undergraduates: 1,846
- Postgraduates: 328
- Location: Oakland, California, U.S. 37.80202°N 122.18715°W
- Campus: Urban, 60 acres (24 ha)
- Nickname: Hawks
- Sporting affiliations: NCAA Division II – PacWest
- Mascot: Hawks
- Website: hnu.edu

Holy Names University (HNU) was a private Catholic university in Oakland, California, United States. It was founded in 1868 by the Sisters of the Holy Names of Jesus and Mary. It remained affiliated with the order until it closed in 2023 due to financial troubles.

== History ==
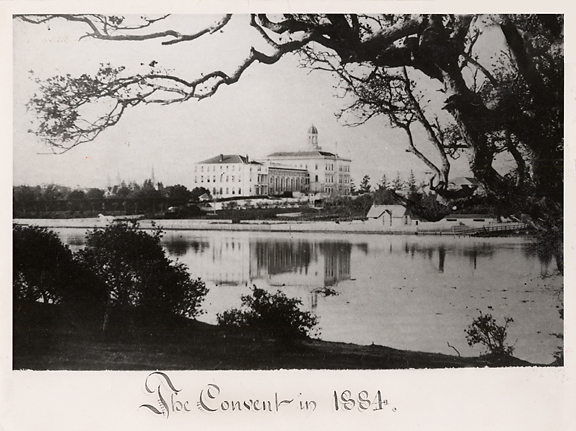
Convent of Our Lady of the Sacred Heart on Oakland's Lake Merritt, 1884

HNU was originally established as the Convent of Our Lady of the Sacred Heart in 1868 by six members of the Sisters of the Holy Names, a teaching order from Quebec, Canada. They were invited to Oakland by Father Michael King, pastor of Saint Mary's Church, to establish a school for girls and to provide means to train future teachers.

The original site of the convent was on the shores of Lake Merritt. By 1908 the convent began to offer classes at a post-secondary level and was renamed the College of the Holy Names. In 1949 the college became one of the charter members of the Western Association of Schools and Colleges (WASC). The coeducation graduate division was formally established in 1955. Soon afterward in 1957, the original site was purchased by Henry J. Kaiser where he constructed the Kaiser Building, and the school moved to its present location in the Oakland Hills. In 1971, Holy Names became coeducational at the undergraduate level and was renamed Holy Names College. The Julia Morgan School for Girls held classes for its first two years, from 1999 through 2001, at Holy Names. The school became Holy Names University (HNU) on May 10, 2004, and became known as the "newest Catholic university in California."

In December 2022, HNU announced plans to close after the spring 2023 semester. It cited "rising operational costs, declining enrollment, and an increased need for institutional aid", particularly in the aftermath of the COVID-19 pandemic and related economic downturn. It formed a relationship with Dominican University of California to allow students to continue their studies there. In 2023, it was reported that HNU was in default on debt for its huge property holdings. The campus was sold to BH Properties in June 2023.

== Campus ==
The HNU campus was located on a wooded, 60-acre (24 ha) site in the East Oakland Hills about 2.5 miles (4.0 km) southeast of the Montclair district. To the north of campus was the neighborhood of Woodminster, and the City of Oakland's Joaquin Miller Park. To the southeast, the campus was flanked with the Crestmont neighborhood to the east, and the Redwood Heights neighborhood to the west across the Warren Freeway. Redwood Regional Park, part of the East Bay Regional Park District, lies about 2.2 miles (3.5 km) east on Redwood Road.

The HNU campus included a 500-bed dormitory.San Francisco architect Milton T. Pflueger designed the mid-century modern campus buildings, which were constructed from 1955 to 1958, and dedicated in 1957. Pflueger designed many campus buildings at University of California, Berkeley and Stanford University, but NHU was the only complete campus he designed. The first buildings constructed at HNU included the Michael and Maureen Hester Administration Building, the Paul J. Cushing Library, the Tobin Gymnasium, and McLean Chapel. The hillside location of HNU inspired a linear plan, with low-roofed buildings nestled along the slope. The site featured panoramic views across the San Francisco Bay from San Jose on the San Francisco Peninsula to Mount Tamalpais on the Marin Peninsula.

The Valley Center for the Performing Arts was constructed in 1994, in the former location of the tennis courts. It housed two separate theatres; large audiences up to 390 could be accommodated in the Regents’ Theatre, while smaller groups used the Studio Theatre with movable seating for up to 125 participants.

The Paul J. Cushing Library was a two-story facility with a distinctive vaulted ceiling and daylight on the main level. Its architectural design mirrors the campus chapel. The library provided electronic and traditional books and journals. Library team members offered instruction to every department.

== Academics ==
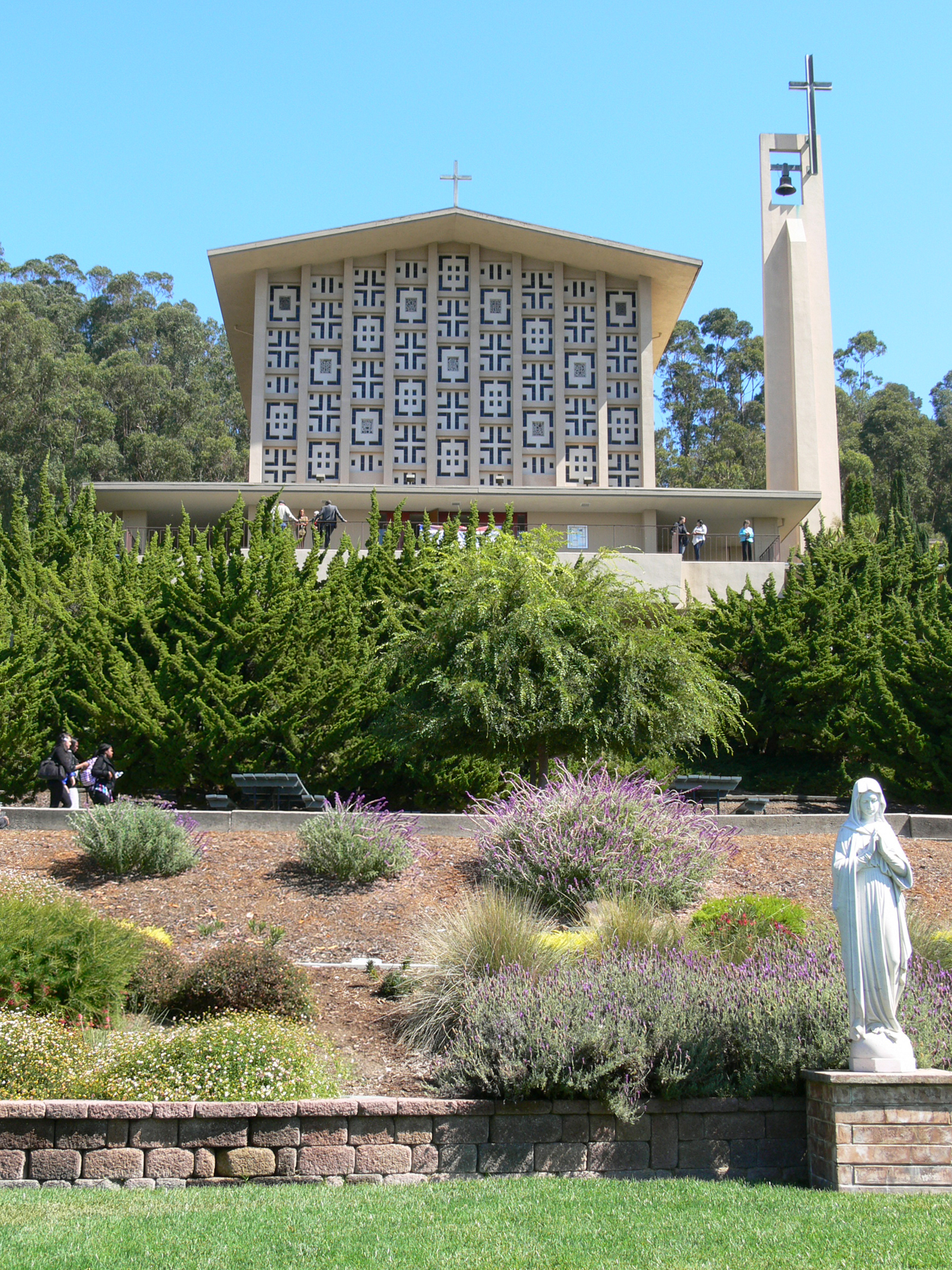
McLean Chapel, Holy Names University

HNU maintained small class sizes, with a student to faculty ratio of 13:1, and 90 percent of the faculty held the highest degree in their fields. U.S. News & World Report ranked HNU as the most diverse university in the West in 2013. This same year, HNU earned the highest diversity index score of all the colleges and universities included in the magazine's multiple diversity rankings.

HNU offered nineteen undergraduate degree programs, and five adult degree completion programs. HNU also offered seven master's degree programs in addition to a teacher education program leading to a California teacher's credential. HNU added a Master of Arts in Forensic Psychology in 2006.

The Center for Social Justice and Civic Engagement (CSJCE) included Service-Learning and Community-Based Leadership (CBL) programs. The CSJCE offered numerous volunteer opportunities, service projects, and dialogues through its CBL initiatives. The HNU Early Admit Program (HNUEAP) was offered through the center.

== Athletics ==
The HNU athletic teams were called the Hawks. HNU was a member of the NCAA Division II ranks, primarily competing in the Pacific West Conference (PacWest) from 2012–13 until 2022–23. The Hawks previously competed in the California Pacific Conference (Cal Pac) of the National Association of Intercollegiate Athletics (NAIA) from 1996–97 to 2011–12.

HNU competed in 13 intercollegiate varsity sports: men's sports include baseball, basketball, cross country, golf, soccer and tennis; while women's sports include basketball, cross country, golf, soccer, softball, tennis and volleyball. Men's volleyball was offered as a club sport. Former NAIA and NCAA teams included men's and women's track and field and men’s volleyball.

== Notable alumni ==
- Belo Cipriani, author of Blind: A Memoir; Cipriani was also HNU's 2012–2014 writer-in-residence
- Carol A. Corrigan, associate justice of the California Supreme Court
- Lydia Dunn, Baroness Dunn, member of the House of Lords in the United Kingdom
- Carroll Fife, Oakland California city council member.
- Luisa Moreno, Latina civil rights activist and labor organizer.
- Anthony Russell, Yiddish singer
- Masayoshi Son, businessman

== See also ==
- List of colleges and universities in California
- Holy Names High School (Oakland, California)
