= Heritage University =

Private university in Toppenish, Washington, US

Coordinates: 46°22′26″N 120°23′42″W

- Motto: Knowledge Brings Us Together
- Type: Private university
- Established: 1982
- Accreditation: Northwest Commission on Colleges and Universities
- President: Chris Gilmer
- Vice-president: Beth Durodoye
- Academic staff: 190
- Administrative staff: 147
- Students: 991
- Undergraduates: 824
- Postgraduates: 167
- Location: Toppenish, Washington, United States
- Campus: Rural: 23 acres
- Website: www.heritage.edu

Heritage University is a private university in Toppenish, Washington, with additional locations in Kennewick, Washington and Pasco, Washington. The university's main campus is located on the Yakama Indian Reservation in south-central Washington. Heritage offers associate, bachelor's, and master's degrees and is accredited by the Northwest Commission on Colleges and Universities.

== History ==
Heritage University traces its educational roots to the Sisters of the Holy Names of Jesus and Mary (SNJM) founded in 1907 by the Sisters of the Holy Names of Jesus and Mary as Holy Names College in Spokane, Washington. The institution subsequently changed its name to Fort Wright College. In 1982, Fort Wright announced it was closing its Spokane campus, and Heritage College, which had been a satellite operation of Fort Wright, was established as an independent organization named Heritage College, which operated there and in Omak. Five years later, the Spokane campus of Fort Wright College was closed.

A fire on July 8, 2012, destroyed the university's oldest building, Petrie Hall.

== Cooperative agreements ==
Heritage University offers upper-division classes at three Washington community college campuses to allow students to work toward a four-year degree from Heritage. This cooperative program began in 1993 to allow holders of associate degrees from Big Bend Community College in Moses Lake to apply their credits toward a Heritage bachelor's degree. Similar cooperative arrangements were established with Columbia Basin College in Pasco and Highline Community College in Des Moines in 2003 and 2006, respectively.
