= Directing Workshop for Women =

The AFI Directing Workshop for Women (DWW) is a program in the American Film Institute (AFI) offers free training workshops and the opportunity to direct short films. The program started in 1974.

== Origins ==
In the 1970s, though many women acted in major motion pictures, almost none directed them. In 1974, Mathilde Krim, a scientist and Rockefeller Foundation board member, approached the American Film Institute (A.F.I.) about using her influence with the foundation to help women in film. Jan Haag, Admission and Awards Administrator at A.F.I., set up a meeting with Krim to discuss possible options. Haag, anticipating at least $200,000, needed to revise her ideas when Krim informed her that she could easily secure only $30,000. A $200,000 grant would need to go through the formal, time-consuming review process that did not necessarily ensure a positive outcome.

To accommodate the limited budget, Haag and Antonio Vellani, A.F.I. administrator and future director of its Center for Advanced Film Studies (CAFS), submitted a plan to Krim to create the Directing Workshop for Women (DWW), based on the Directing Workshop at the CAFS. To save money, DWW students would use the CAFS equipment and the CAFS students would act as producers, cinematographers, etc. for DWW projects. Though the women could use CAFS equipment, the DWW needed additional editing equipment, which would cost $14,000. After these expenses were met, each student would receive a budget of $300 per film to cover expenses and would make two films. The A.F.I. also formalized an agreement with the Screen Actors Guild, which allowed their actors to volunteer to act in DWW films.

Once the AFI officially obtained the Rockefeller Foundation's grant for the program, Haag's next step was to establish a review board to choose twelve students for admission. The applicant review board Haag and Vellani decided on consisted of four successful women: Joan Didion, a writer; Marcia Nasiter, Vice President of United Artists; Kitty Hawks, an agent; and Barbara Schultz, an executive at PBS.

== Sources ==
- https://conservatory.afi.com/dww-alums/
- The AFI Directing Workshop for Women website
- Haag, Jan. “The Dream of the Marble Bridge: The Founding of the Directing Workshop
- For Women of the American Film Institute, A History.” By Jan Haag. 2002.
- http://janhaag.com/ESessays.html (29 January 2007).
