= Sisters of the Holy Names of Jesus and Mary =

Teaching religious institute in Canada

- Soeurs des Saints Noms de Jésus et de Marie
- Abbreviation: SNJM
- Formation: 1843
- Type: Catholic religious institute
- Purpose: Christian education of young girls
- Headquarters: Longueuil, Québec, Canada
- Website: snjm.org

The Sisters of the Holy Names of Jesus and Mary (Soeurs des Saints Noms de Jésus et de Marie) is a teaching religious institute founded at Longueuil, Québec, Canada, in 1843 by Blessed Mother Marie Rose Durocher for the Christian education of young girls.

Their motto is: "Jésus et Marie, Ma Force et Ma Gloire" ("Jesus and Mary, my strength and my glory").

Since 1843, the SNJM's mission to educate young girls has extended beyond Québec into other Canadian provinces, including Ontario and Manitoba. Their mission of education also continues internationally, in the United States, Lesotho, and South America.

Within the United States, the sisters have established ministries in California, Oregon, Florida, Mississippi, New York, the Mid-Atlantic states and Washington among other states.

== High schools and universities ==
High schools (not a complete list)

- Academy of the Holy Names (Albany, New York)
- Academy of the Holy Names (Tampa, Florida)
- Holy Names Academy in Seattle, Washington
- Holy Names High School (Oakland, California)
- Ramona Convent Secondary School (Alhambra, California)
- Saint Monica Catholic High School (Santa Monica, California)
- St. Mary's Academy (Portland, Oregon)
- St. Mary's Academy (Winnipeg, Manitoba)
- St. Andrew's High School (Pasadena, California) (closed - elementary school still in operation, see St. Andrew's Catholic Church (Pasadena, California))
- Holy Names High School in Bela Bela, Lesotho
- Pensionnat du Saint-Nom-de-Marie in Montreal, Quebec, Canada
- http://www.hnmc.org Holy Names Music Center in Spokane, Washington

Universities

- Holy Names University in Oakland, California (permanently closed in 2023)
- Marylhurst University near Portland, Oregon (permanently closed in 2018)

Continuing Care Retirement Community

- Mary's Woods
