= History of Spokane, Washington =

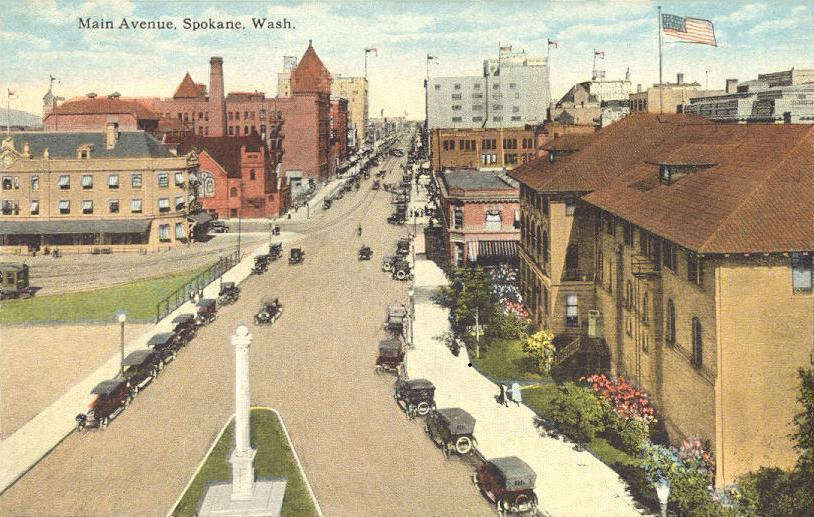
Main Avenue ca. 1920

The history of Spokane, Washington in the northwestern United States developed because Spokane Falls and its surroundings were a gathering place for numerous cultures for thousands of years. The area's indigenous people settled there due to the fertile hunting grounds and abundance of salmon in the Spokane River. The first European to explore the Inland Northwest was Canadian explorer-geographer David Thompson, working as head of the North West Company's Columbia Department. At the nexus of the Little Spokane and the Spokane, Thompson's men built a new fur trading post, which is the first long-term European settlement in Washington state.

The first American settlers, squatters J.J. Downing, with his wife, stepdaughter, and S.R. Scranton, built a cabin and established a claim at Spokane Falls in 1871. James N. Glover and Jasper Matheney, two Oregonians passing through the region in 1873, recognized the value of the Spokane River and its falls. They realized the development potential and bought the claims of 160 acres (0.65 km^{2}) and the sawmill from Downing and Scranton for $4,000 total. Glover and Matheney knew that the Northern Pacific Railroad Company had received a government charter to build a main line across this northern route. By 1881, the Northern Pacific Railway was completed, bringing major European settlement to the area. With the arrival of the Northern Pacific Railroad and the later additions to the city's railroad infrastructure by the arrival of the Union Pacific, Great Northern, and Chicago, Milwaukee, St. Paul and Pacific railroads, Spokane became the commercial center of the Inland Northwest. It was one of the most important rail centers in the western United States. Spokane hosted the first environmentally themed World's Fair in Expo '74, becoming the then-smallest city to ever host a World's Fair. With falling silver, timber, and farm prices, the city economy began a decline that would last into the 1990s. Spokane is still trying to make the transition to a more service-oriented economy. The opening of the River Park Square Mall in 1999 sparked a downtown rebirth that included the building of the Spokane Arena and expansion of the Spokane Convention Center.

== Pre-contact to 1810 ==
=== First habitation ===
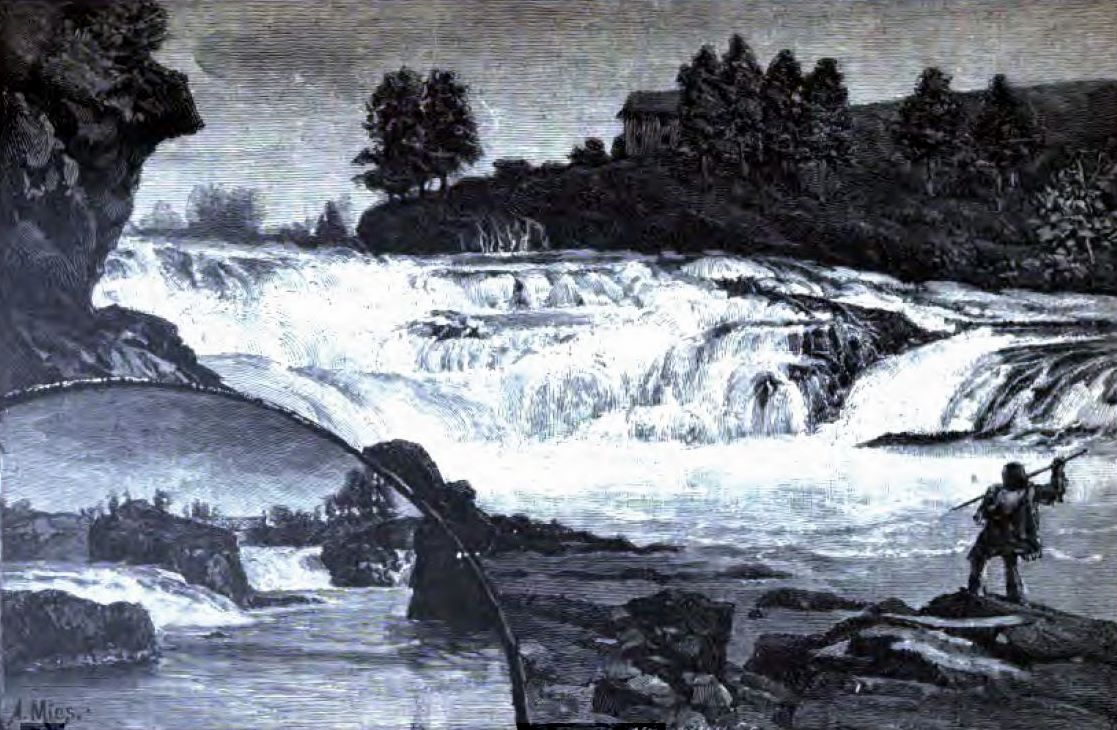
Spokane Falls in 1888

The Spokane Falls and its surroundings were a gathering place and focus for settlement for the area's indigenous people for thousands of years, due to the fertile hunting grounds and abundance of salmon in the Spokane River. The first humans to arrive in the Spokane area arrived between 12,000 and 8,000 years ago and were hunter-gatherer societies who lived off the plentiful game in the area. Initially, the settlers hunted predominantly bison and antelope, but after the game migrated out of the region, the native people became dependent on gathering various roots, berries, and nuts, and harvesting fish. The Spokane tribe, after which the city is named (which means "Children of the Sun" or "sun people" in Salishan^{[a]}), are believed to be either direct descendants of the original hunter-gatherers who settled in the region, or descendants of tribes that migrated to the area from the Great Plains. When asked about their origins by early white explorers, the tribe said their ancestors came from "Up North".

The Spokane Falls were the tribe's center of trade and fishing where they had a number of fishing camps near the base of the falls. Regional tribes would convene at this bountiful fishery during the annual Chinook salmon run to fish, trade, and engage in cultural activities. Along the falls, the salmon would be caught using various fish trap methods and the catch would be dried and smoked on site to preserve and store them for sustenance during the sparse winter months. Among the gathering tribes, a "Salmon Chief" is chosen to coordinate fishing efforts, hold prayer, lead singing ceremonies, and bless and distribute the catch equitably to the tribes. The Spokane consisted of three bands that lived along the Spokane River. The Spokane people shared their culture and Salishan language family with several other tribes, including the Coeur d' Alenes, Kalispels, Pend Oreilles, Flatheads, Kootenays, and Colvilles among others.

Early in the 19th century, the Northwest Fur Company sent two white fur trappers west of the Rocky Mountains to search for fur. They were friendly with the native people they encountered. The trappers became the first two white men met by the Spokane tribe, who believed them to be Sama, or sacred. They helped them get shelter in the Colville River valley for the winter. The tribe discovered the men brought no "big magic" to the tribe, as their members had continued to die from smallpox, which had first struck the tribe in an epidemic in 1782. As much as half the tribe had died in that epidemic.

== 1810–1890 ==
=== Trading post ===
The explorer-geographer David Thompson, working as head of the North West Company's Columbia Department, became the first European to explore the Inland Empire (now often called the Inland Northwest). Crossing what is now the U.S.–Canada border from British Columbia, Thompson wanted to expand the North West Company further south in search of furs. After establishing the Kullyspell House and Saleesh House trading posts in what are now Idaho and Montana, Thompson then attempted to expand further west. He sent out two trappers, Jacques Raphael Finlay and Finan McDonald, to construct a fur trading post on the Spokane River in Washington and trade with the local Indians. This post was established in 1810, at the confluence of the Little Spokane and Spokane rivers, becoming the first enduring European settlement of significance in Washington state. Known as the Spokane House, or simply "Spokane", it was in operation from 1810 to 1826. Operations were run by the British North West Company and later the Hudson's Bay Company, and the post was the headquarters of the fur trade between the Rocky and Cascade mountains for 16 years. After the latter business absorbed the North West Company in 1821, the major operations at the Spokane House were eventually shifted north to Fort Colvile, reducing the post's significance.

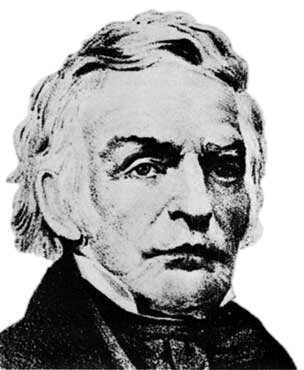
Reverend Samuel Parker, who visited the area in 1836

In 1836, Reverend Samuel Parker visited the area and reported that around 800 Native Americans were living in Spokane Falls. A medical mission was established by Marcus and Narcissa Whitman to cater for Cayuse Indians and hikers of the Oregon Trail at Walla Walla in the south. After the Whitmans were killed by Indians in 1847, Reverend Cushing Eells established Whitman College in the city of Walla Walla, Washington in their memory. Rev. Eells built the first church in Spokane in 1881. Between 1881 and 1882 the first Baptist and Episcopal churches were started, and the first Presbyterian church in 1883.

In 1853, Washington Territory was established and its first governor, Isaac Stevens, made an initial effort to make a treaty with Chief Garry and the Spokanes at Antoine Plantes’ Ferry, not far from Millwood.

An increasing American settler presence in Washington Territory caused simmering tensions and conflicts between the Native American tribes and white settlers, many miners en route to seek fortune in the gold fields in the Colville district. These conflicts and reprisals eventually prompted intervention from the United States Army on October 5, 1855, starting the Yakima Indian War. The last campaign of this war, the Coeur d'Alene War, was brought to a close by the actions of Col. George Wright, who won decisive victories against a confederation of tribes in engagements at the Battle of Four Lakes and the Battle of Spokane Plains, avenging an earlier loss under Lt. Col. Edward Steptoe at the Battle of Pine Creek. Wright's actions ended the hostilities and opened the mountain valley of the Pacific Northwest to safe habitation by settlers.

=== American settlement ===
Joint American–British occupation of Oregon Country, in effect since the Treaty of 1818, eventually led to the Oregon Boundary Dispute after a large influx of American settlers along the Oregon Trail. The first American settlers in what is now Spokane were J.J. Downing and S.R. Scranton, cattle ranchers who squatted and established a claim at Spokane Falls in 1871. Together they built a small sawmill on a claim near the south bank of the falls. James N. Glover and Jasper Matheney, Oregonians passing through the region in 1873, recognized the value of the Spokane River and its falls for the purpose of water power. They realized the investment potential and bought the claims of 160 acres (0.65 km^{2}) and the sawmill from Downing and Scranton for a total of $4,000. Glover and Matheney knew that the Northern Pacific Railroad Company had received a government charter to build a main line across this northern route. Amid many delays in construction and uncertainty over the completion of the railroad and its exact course, Matheney sold his interest in the claim to Glover.^{[a]} Glover confidently held on to his claim and became a successful Spokane business owner and mayor. He later came to be known as the "Father of Spokane".

=== Fort Spokane ===
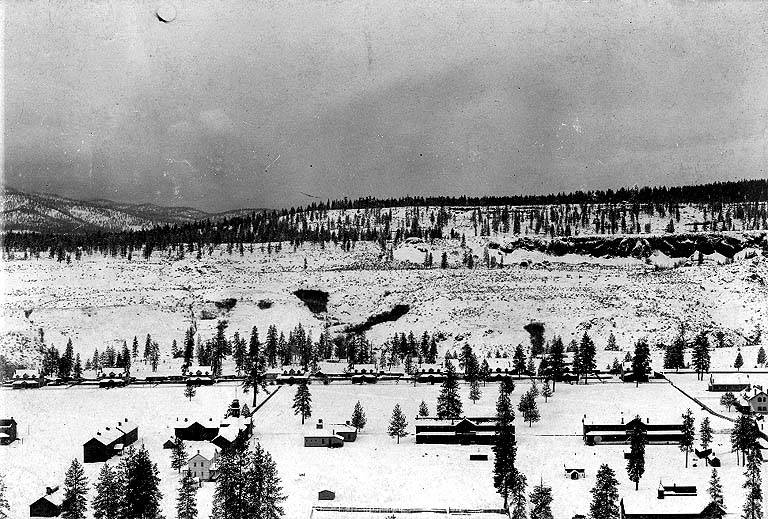
Fort Spokane ca. 1895

In 1880, Fort Spokane was established by U.S. Army troops under Lt. Col. Henry Clay Merriam 56 miles (90 km) northwest of Spokane, at the junction of the Columbia and Spokane Rivers, to protect the construction of the Northern Pacific Railway and secure a place for U.S. settlement. Settlers among the Spokane and Colville Indians in Eastern Washington were afraid that war might break out. Camp Spokane served to separate the Indians from the settlers, being located between the Colville and Spokane reservations—protecting the growing non-Indian communities of Spokane Falls (later Spokane) and Cheney. While stationed, Merriam's troops erected some temporary buildings at the post, which they initially called Camp Spokane, but in 1881 one of the four infantry companies was still living in tents. Then early in 1882, President Arthur formally set aside a military reservation at the site, which was renamed Fort Spokane.

=== The Railroad and Population Boom ===
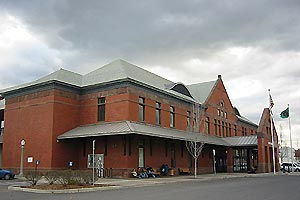
Spokane's historic Northern Pacific Railway Depot

The Northern Pacific Railway's northern transcontinental route, funded by a huge federal land grant in 1864, started construction in 1870, near Duluth, Minnesota headed west, meanwhile starting in Portland, Oregon headed north to Seattle, Washington then over the Cascade Range toward Spokane. By June 30, 1881, the western branch reached the city. The connection to the east completed September 8, 1883. The railroad facilitated major European settlement, by bringing people, supplying locally unavailable consumer goods, and carrying local products of mining, farming, and lumbering to market.

The city of Spokane Falls officially incorporated as a city of about 1,000 residents on November 29, 1881.^{[c]} Robert W. Forrest was elected as the first mayor of the city, with a Council of seven - S. G. Havermale, A. M. Cannon, Dr. L. H. Whitehouse, L. W. Rima, F. R. Moore, George A. Davis, and W. C. Gray, all serving without pay. James N. Glover, second mayor, is considered the founder and "Father of Spokane".

The small population increased rapidly, streets were built, and the small settlement became a city. The city's population grew from 4,130 to 8,891 between 1881 and 1885 and wrested the county seat from Cheney in the 1886 elections. The city's population ballooned to 19,922 in 1890.

=== The Great Fire ===
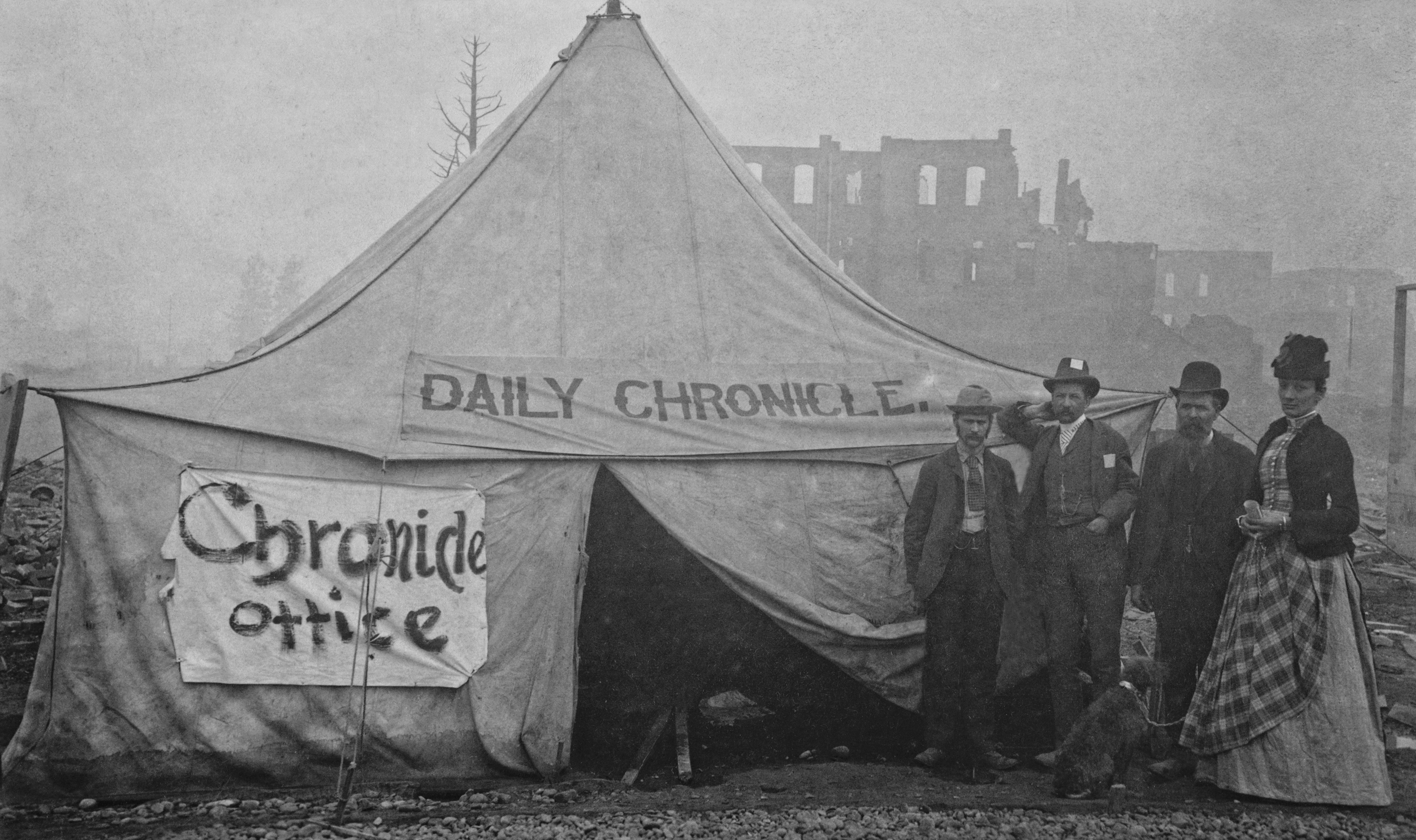
The makeshift Daily Chronicle office after The Great Fire

Spokane's growth continued unabated until August 4, 1889, when a fire, now known as The Great Fire (not to be confused with the Great Fire of 1910, which happened nearby), began just after 6:00 p.m. and destroyed the city's downtown commercial district. Due to technical problems with a pump station, there was no water pressure in the city when the fire started. In a desperate bid to starve the fire, firefighters began razing buildings with dynamite. Eventually the winds and the fire died down; 32 blocks of Spokane's downtown core had been destroyed and one person killed.

== 1890–1915 ==
=== Rebuilding ===
After the devastation of the fire, Spokane experienced a building boom, financed in large part by real estate investments from Dutch bankers.^{[e]} In 1883, Herman A. Van Valkenburg, a Dutch businessman, came to Spokane to appraise railroad investments, and in 1885, formed the Northwestern and Pacific Mortgage Company. The company was reorganized in The Netherlands as the Northwestern and Pacific Hypotheekbank on June 4, 1889. By 1893, Dutch investors held one-fourth of real estate in Spokane, and continued to provide a significant contribution to Spokane's growth through the middle of the 20th century. However, following the depression of 1893, many of these Dutch bankers sold their ventures to new local investors. The downtown was swiftly rebuilt with local investment from the regions mineral resources using brick, stone masonry, and terra cotta. Within a year, 100 buildings had been built on the blank canvas that is now the downtown core, much of it from esteemed architects such as Herman Preusse, Kirtland Cutter, and John K. Dow, and Spokane was able to host the 1890 Northwest Industrial Exposition.

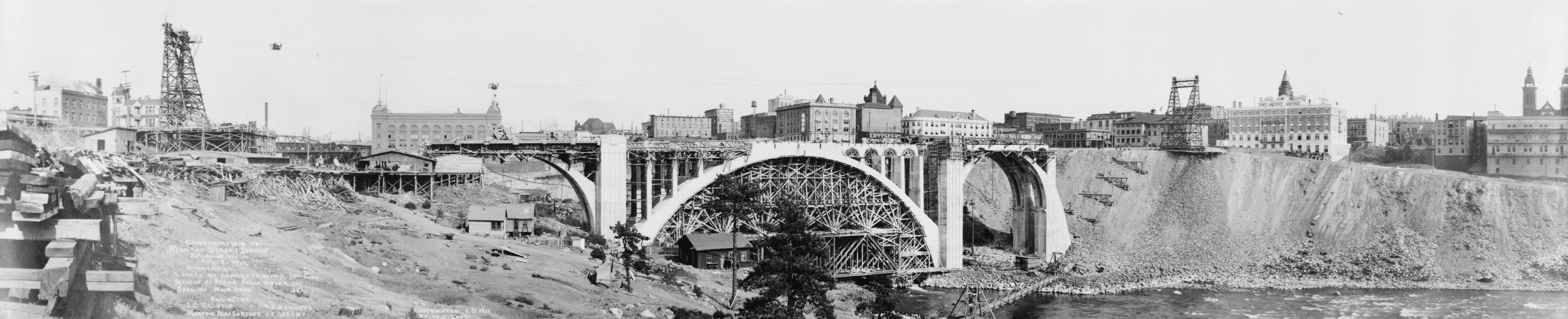
The Monroe Street Bridge, 1911

As the downtown was rebuilt, the city reincorporated under the name "Spokane" in 1891. According to historian David H. Stratton, "From the late 1890s to about 1912, a great flurry of construction created a modern urban profile of office buildings, banks, department stores, hotels and other commercial institutions," which stretched from the Spokane River to the site of the Northern Pacific railroad tracks below the South Hill. Yet the rebuilding and development of the city was far from smooth: between 1889 and 1896 alone, all six bridges over the Spokane River were destroyed by floods before their completion.

=== More Railroads ===
In 1886, Daniel Chase Corbin built his first railroad into the Spokane Valley. D. C. Corbin, brother of Austin Corbin, left home at 19 and moved steadily west building his fortune dealing in land, stage stations, freighting, and mercantile, landing in Helena, Montana about 1866. Here he branched into banking, smelting, and the mining industry. Starting in 1885, his interest turned to the Coeur d’Alene Mining District, where he invested in a mill for the Bunker Hill and Sullivan mines. A railroad to quickly connect the mines and mill to markets was evident and Corbin beat various competitors to completing one. In 1886, with his son, Austin Corbin, he began two lines, the Spokane Falls & Idaho, connector to Northern Pacific, and the Coeur d'Alene Railway and Navigation Company, between Coeur d’Alene and the Silver Valley. In 1888, he sold the Coeur d’Alene line to Northern Pacific, and started the Spokane Falls and Northern Railway in 1889, from Spokane to Northport. He added subsidiaries: the Nelson and Fort Sheppard in 1891, the Columbia and Red Mountain Railway in 1895, the Eastern British Columbia Railway, and the Spokane International Railroad in 1906, connecting to the Canadian Pacific Railway, with its connections to Chicago, Milwaukee, St. Paul and Pacific Railroad.

In 1888, the Oregon Railroad and Navigation Company extended a line from the south, connecting Spokane to Portland, Pasco, and Walla Walla. It was bought out by Union Pacific Railroad which connected the line to their transcontinental rail system to the south.

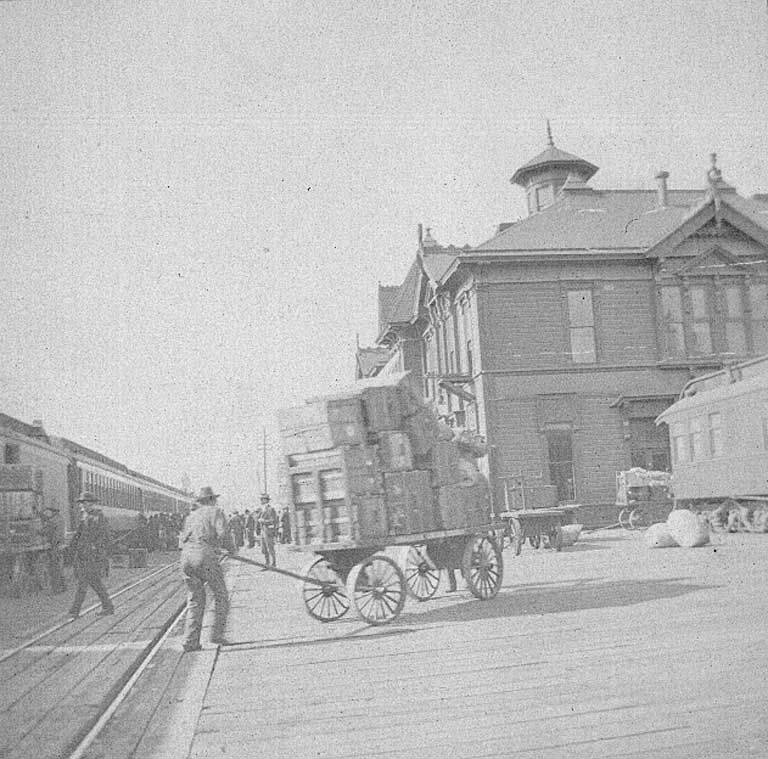
Worker moving boxes at a train station, ca. 1900

Starting in 1890, the first components of Spokane and Inland Empire Railroad Company, an electrified interurban railway, began with Francis H. Cook's Spokane and Montrose Street Railway. He sold to a group headed by Jay P. Graves in 1902, who reorganized as the Spokane Traction Company, in 1903, and incorporated as the Spokane and Inland Empire Railroad Company in 1904, rebuilding with standard gauge line. Routes were extended through various areas of Spokane, including Corbin Park, Hillyard, and Lincoln Heights.

Three years after the fire, in 1892, James J. Hill brought his Great Northern Railway to Spokane. He platted and named Hillyard township (annexed by Spokane in 1924) for his rail yards, machine shops, and roundhouse, because of the area's flat ground. A town was built to house railroad workers, mainly immigrant laborers working in the local yard.

With the arrival of railroads and additions to the city's railroad infrastructure, Spokane became the commercial center of the Inland Northwest, as well as an important rail and shipping center because of its location between the Rocky Mountains and the Cascade Range and between mining (particularly Idaho's Silver Valley) and agricultural areas (the Palouse). Located at crossroads of four transcontinental railroads, Spokane became one of the most important rail centers in the western United States.

=== New Immigrants ===
The population grew to 36,848 in 1900 with the arrival of the additional railroads. The railroads lured settlers from as far away as Finland, Germany, and England and as close as Minnesota and the Dakotas. The marketing campaigns of transportation companies with affordable fertile land to sell along their trade routes lured many settlers into the region they dubbed "Spokane Country".

The city also developed a sizable Asian community, centered in a district called Chinatown. As in many western railway towns, the Asian community started off as an encampment for migrant laborers, mostly Chinese, working on the railroads. Initially, these workers came without their families, and the district gained an unsavory reputation. By about 1900, the community was improving as more immigrants families, especially Japanese families, moved in. The immigrant populations also established houses of worship in their traditions, such as the First German Baptist Church in East Central.

By 1910, the population hit 104,000. These railroads made Spokane a transportation hub for the Inland Northwest region. The railroads connected Spokane to major commerce centers on the east and west coast, as well as in Canada, and allowed Spokane to eclipse Walla Walla as the commercial center of the Inland Northwest. In time the city came to be known as the "capital" of the Inland Empire and the heart of a vast tributary region.

=== Mining ===
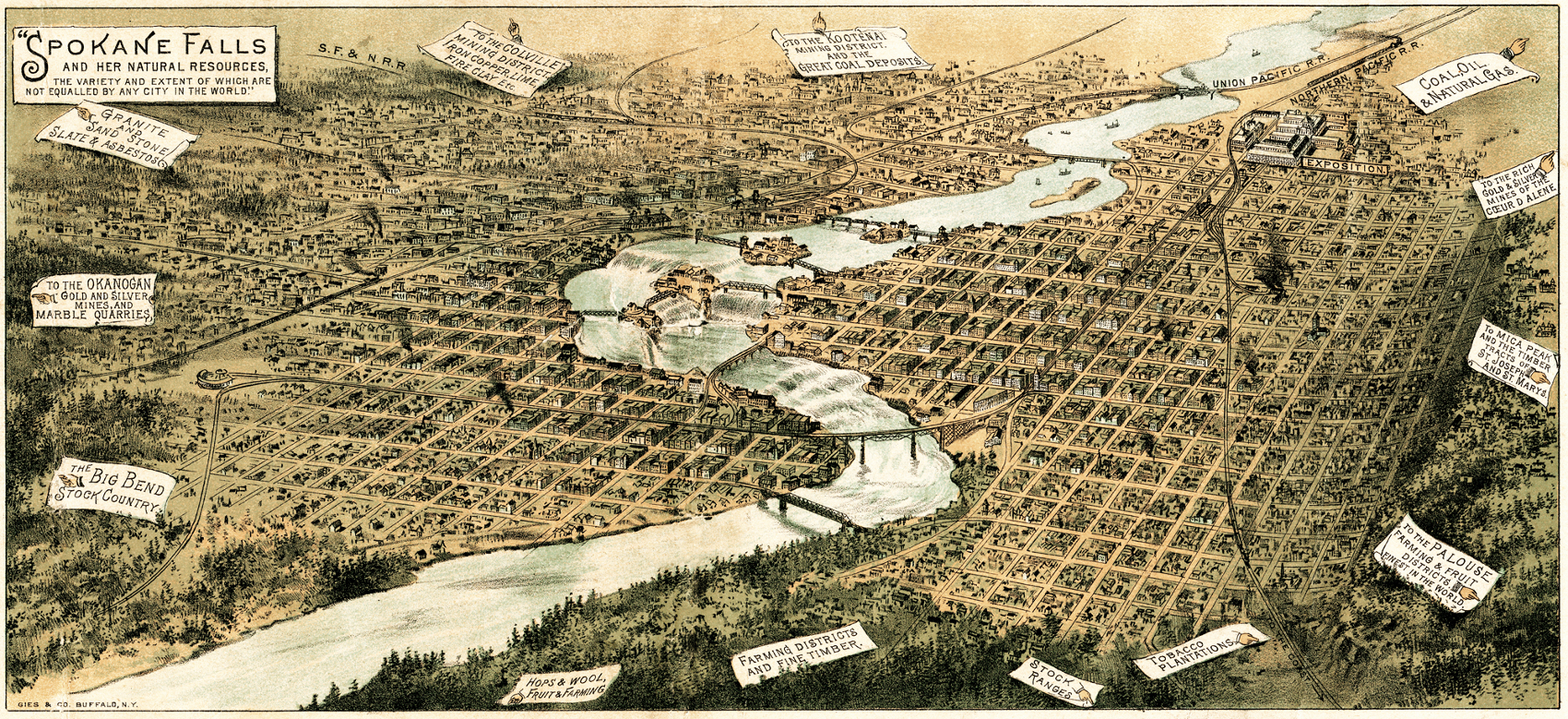
Spokane Falls, 1890

In 1883, with the discovery of gold, silver, and lead in the Coeur d'Alene region, mining emerged as a major stimulus to Spokane and the city served as a popular outfitting and jumping-off point for miners. The discovery of gold, silver, and lead in the Coeur d'Alene region (which generally encompasses present-day Stevens, Ferry, and Pend Oreille counties and northern Idaho) in the 1880s precipitated a rush of prospectors into the region. The Inland Empire erupted with numerous mining rushes from 1883 to the late 19th century. In the 1890s the city was subject to intrastate migration by African-Americans from Roslyn, looking for work after the closure of the area's mines. Two African-American churches, Calvary Baptist and Bethel African Methodist Episcopal, were founded in 1890.

Spokane became home to many entrepreneurs, companies and managers as well as the place to finance mining and other business operations. As a regional shipping center, the city furnished supplies to the miners who passed through on their way to mine in the Coeur d’Alene region. At the onset of the initial 1883 gold rush near Coeur d'Alene, Spokane became the outfitter of choice among prospectors due to the areas lower prices and convenience of being able to obtain everything "from a horse to a frying pan". It would keep this status for subsequent rushes in the region due to its trade center status and accessibility to railroad infrastructure.^{[d]} During the mining boom, Spokane had its own stock exchange, the Spokane Stock Exchange, which began trading mining shares on January 18, 1897. The exchange originally consisted of 32 members and listed 37 stocks of mines across northeastern Washington, northern Idaho and southern British Columbia. Today, the Spokane area is still considered one of the most productive mining districts in North America.

=== Emergence of logging and milling ===
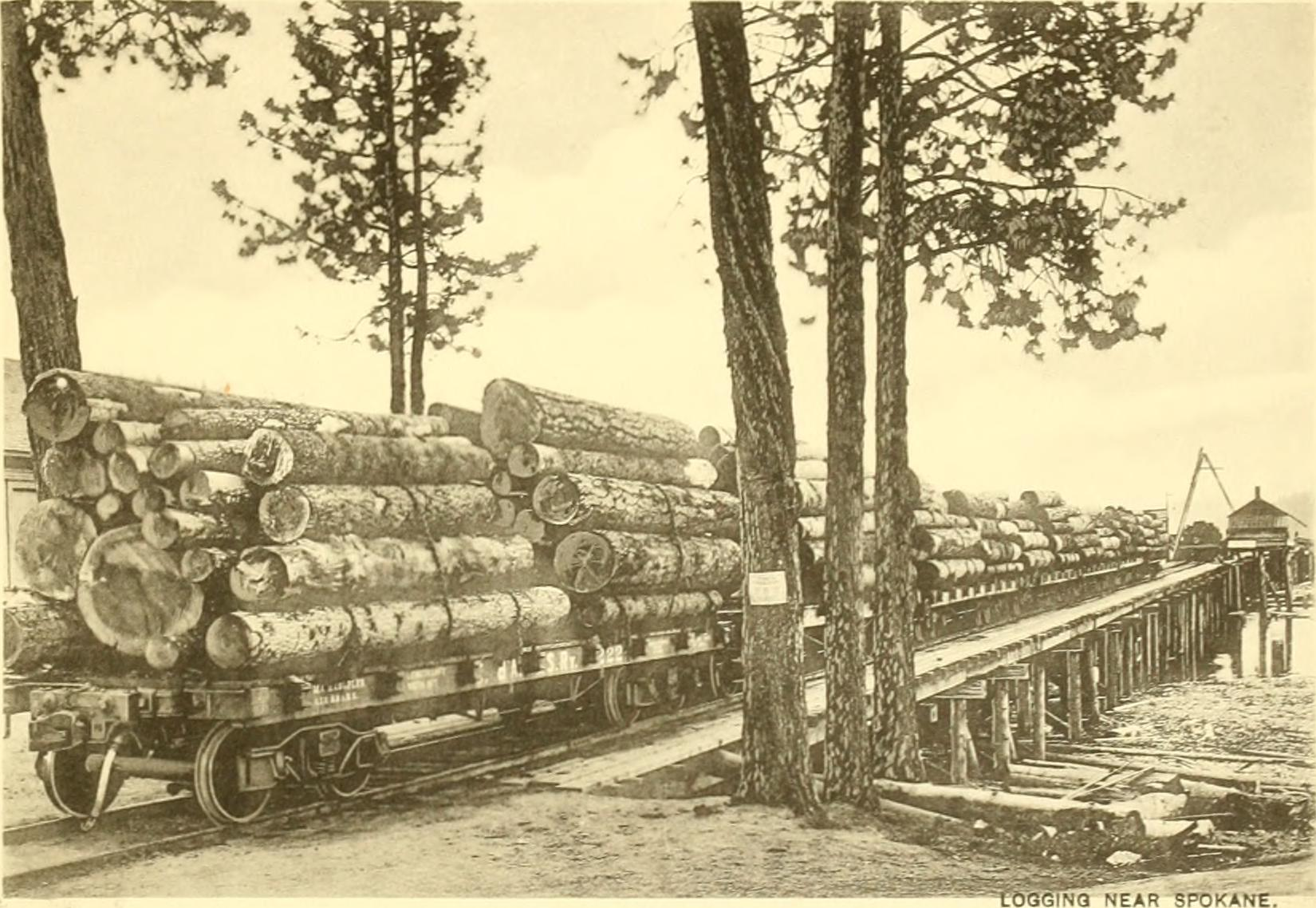
Logging activities ca. 1890

After mining declined at the turn of the 20th century, agriculture and logging became the primary influences in the Spokane economy. The lumber industry in Spokane began with the city's founding in 1871 when Downing and Scranton built Spokane's first business, a sawmill. When it became widely known after a United States Geological Survey done in the 1890s that there were large quantities of white pine, a highly prized softwood, in the Coeur d'Alene Mountains, the lumber industry from the Eastern United States began to inventory the timberlands, acquire land and invest in facilities across much of North Idaho. As with the mining industry, the lumber industry in the city contributed to the economy by the means of outfitting the lumberjacks and millmen working in the hundreds of mills along the railroads, rivers, and lakes of northern Washington and Idaho. The population explosion and the building of homes, railroads, and mines in northern Idaho and southern British Columbia fueled the industry. Before the construction of the railroads that connected the region, Spokane's lumber supply was largely imported from North Idaho, especially St. Maries, Idaho; lumber would be rafted 25 miles north on the St. Joe River and Lake Coeur d'Alene and then rafted down to Spokane's mills via the Spokane River. In Idaho, lumber production reached its height in the late 1910s and 1920s; in 1925 there were seven lumber mills operating in the area that were producing 500 million board feet of lumber. Although overshadowed in importance by the vast timbered areas on the coastal regions west of the Cascades, and burdened with monopolistic rail freight rates and stiff competition, Spokane became a noted leader in the manufacture of doors, window sashes, blinds, and other planing mill products.

During this period, railroad companies charged what many believed were unfair shipping rates on goods going into Spokane. These rates were much higher than rates to coastal seaport cities such as Seattle and Portland; so much so that Minneapolis merchants could ship goods first to Seattle and then back to Spokane for less than shipping directly to Spokane, even though the rail line ran through Spokane on the way to the coast.^{[f]} This had a significant impact on the local economy, with many merchants simply choosing not to do business in Spokane. In 1892, the Interstate Commerce Commission agreed with the city after it filed a complaint about these practices, but that decision was struck down by a federal court. In 1906, Spokane sued under the newly passed Hepburn Act, and won on July 24, 1911. Due to these shipping rates, no alternative transport for their shipments, the lack of a seaport, and access to international markets, Spokane never became a prominent leader in the production of lumber.

The city became noted for processing and distributing dairy and orchard products and for producing products milled from timber. The Spokane area is a major center for the timber and agriculture in the Inland Northwest region. By the early twentieth century Spokane was primarily a commercial center rather than an industrial center.

=== Emergence of agribusiness ===
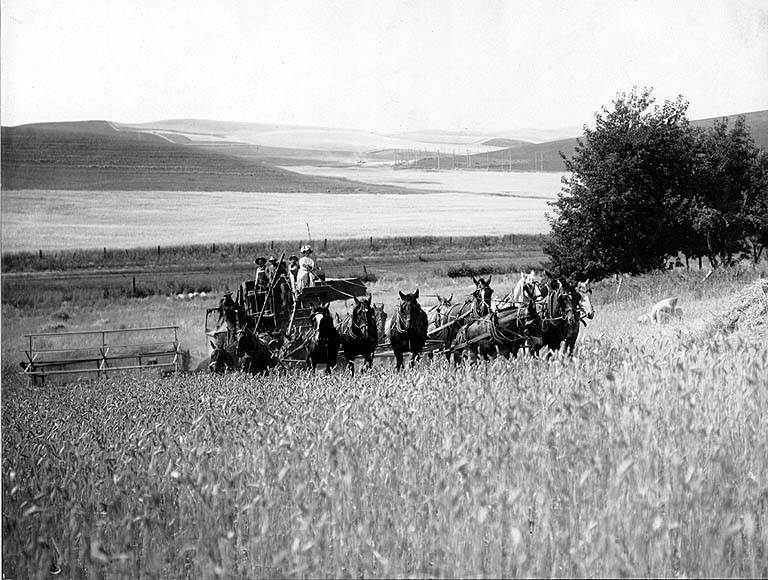
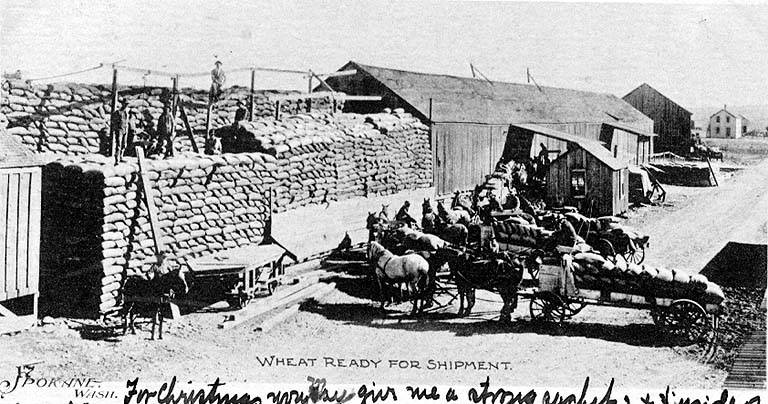
The harvesting and packing of wheat in the early 20th century

The Inland Northwest region has also long been associated with farming, especially wheat production where it is one of the largest wheat producing regions in the United States. Initially, the Palouse region to the south of Spokane was thought to be not suited for wheat production due to the hilly terrain, believing wheat could not be cultivated on the tops of the hills, but the region showed great promise for wheat production when it began in the late 1850s in part due to the hilltops. Agricultural potential and productivity depends greatly on a region's soil qualities which in turn is dependent on the climate and amount and timing of rainfall events. The Inland Empire, with its cool, snowy and rainy winters, rainy spring, and hot and dry summers lends itself to a wide variety of farming. The commercial farming activities were greatly enhanced by the founding of two state land-grant universities, Washington State University (as the Agriculture College, Experiment Station and School of Science of the State of Washington) in Pullman and the University of Idaho eight miles away in Moscow, Idaho. The strategically placed universities and their experiment stations and staff would help the industry by improving farm management, conducting research, and teaching students to be better, more competent farmers. Industry innovators such as William Jasper Spillman (1863-1931) and later Orville Vogel (1907-1991) and others would make significant contributions and observations to the widen the knowledge of agriculture, horticulture and farm management and animal science with applications for the region and around the world.

"Spokane Country" was a breadbasket. As marketed by the Spokane Chamber of Commerce in 1907, it was defined as the area between the Cascades and Rocky Mountains, British Columbia and the Blue Mountains. Its agribusiness developed and grew with the completion of the railroad networks and highway system that centered around the city, which aided farmers around the region in distributing their products to market at low cost.

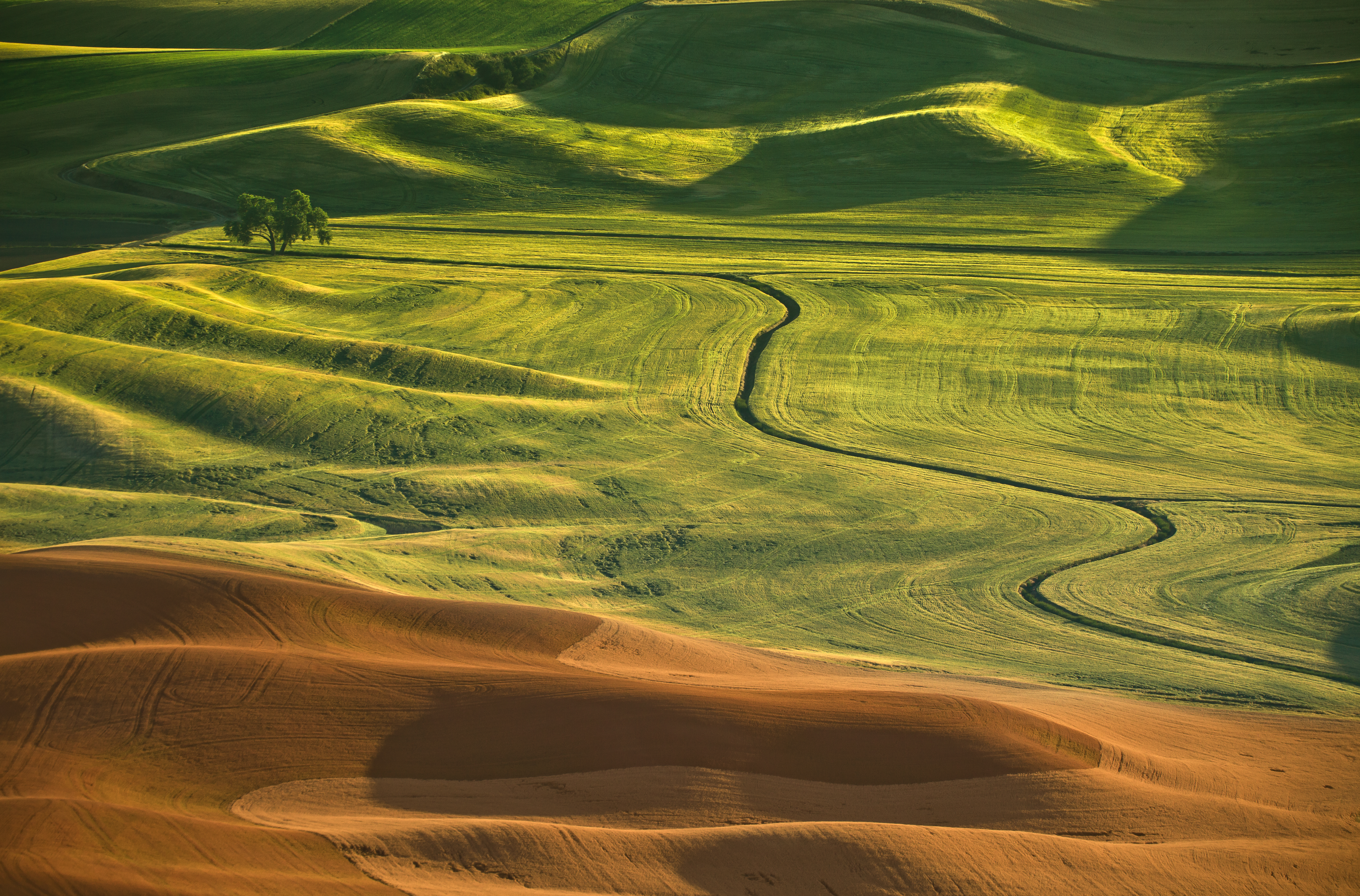
The fertile rolling hills of the Palouse viewed from Steptoe Butte

The growth of the Inland Northwest's rural counties also was the result of the governmental and private efforts to irrigate and develop farmlands in the region. These programs, especially the Big Bend Project, resulted in an estimated 2,000,000 acres of arable farmland worth an estimated value of $50,000,000 in 1920.

The gravelly Spokane Valley, immediately to the east of Spokane, was not a good candidate for wheat, but instead developed extensive fruit orchards. By 1922, there were more than 1.6 million apple trees planted in the Valley and huge packing plants built.

As with mining in the late 1880s, Spokane was an important agricultural market and supply center. Inland Empire farmers exported wheat, fruit, livestock, and other agricultural products to ports such as New York, Liverpool and Tokyo through the Spokane rail and highway infrastructure. Wayne D. Rasmussen notes the U.S. Works Progress Administration showed in 1940, "3 flour mills, 5 meat packing plants, 23 creameries, 17 bakeries, and 6 poultry plants" as well as 300 factories operating in the city.

=== Free speech fight ===
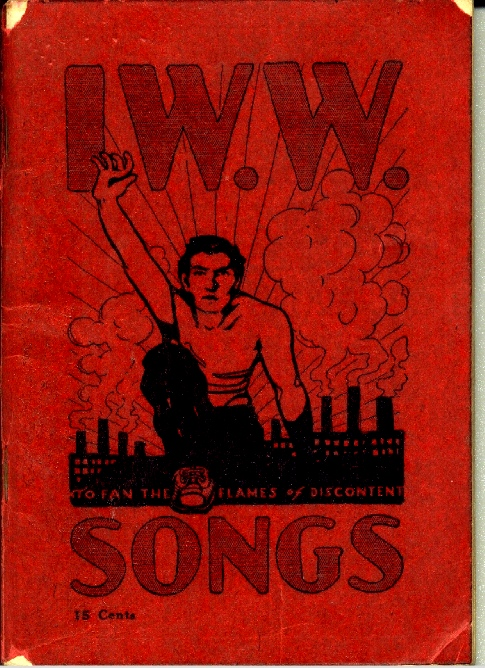
The Little Red Songbook and The Industrial Worker began publication in Spokane in 1909.

During this time of stagnation, unrest was prevalent among the area's unemployed, who became victimized by "job sharks", who charged a fee for signing up workers in the logging camps. Job sharks and employment agencies were known to cheat itinerant workers, sometimes paying bribes to periodically fire entire work crews, thus generating repetitive fees for themselves. Crime spiked in the 1890s and 1900s, with eruptions of violent activity involving unions such as the Industrial Workers of the World (IWW), or "Wobblies" as they were often known, whose free speech fights had begun to garner national attention. Now, with grievances concerning the unethical practices of the employment agencies, they initiated a free speech fight in September 1908 by purposely breaking a city ordinance on soapboxing. With IWW encouragement, union members from many western states came to Spokane to take part in what had become a publicity stunt. Many Wobblies were incarcerated, including feminist labor leader Elizabeth Gurley Flynn, who published her account in the local Industrial Worker.

=== First celebration of Father's Day ===
Spokane is known as the birthplace of the national movement started by Sonora Smart Dodd that led to the proposal and eventual establishment of Father's Day as a national holiday in the U.S. The first observation of Father's Day in Spokane was on June 19, 1910. Sonora conceived the idea in Spokane's Central Methodist Episcopal Church while listening to a Mother's Day sermon.

== 1915–1990 ==
=== Growth and stagnation ===
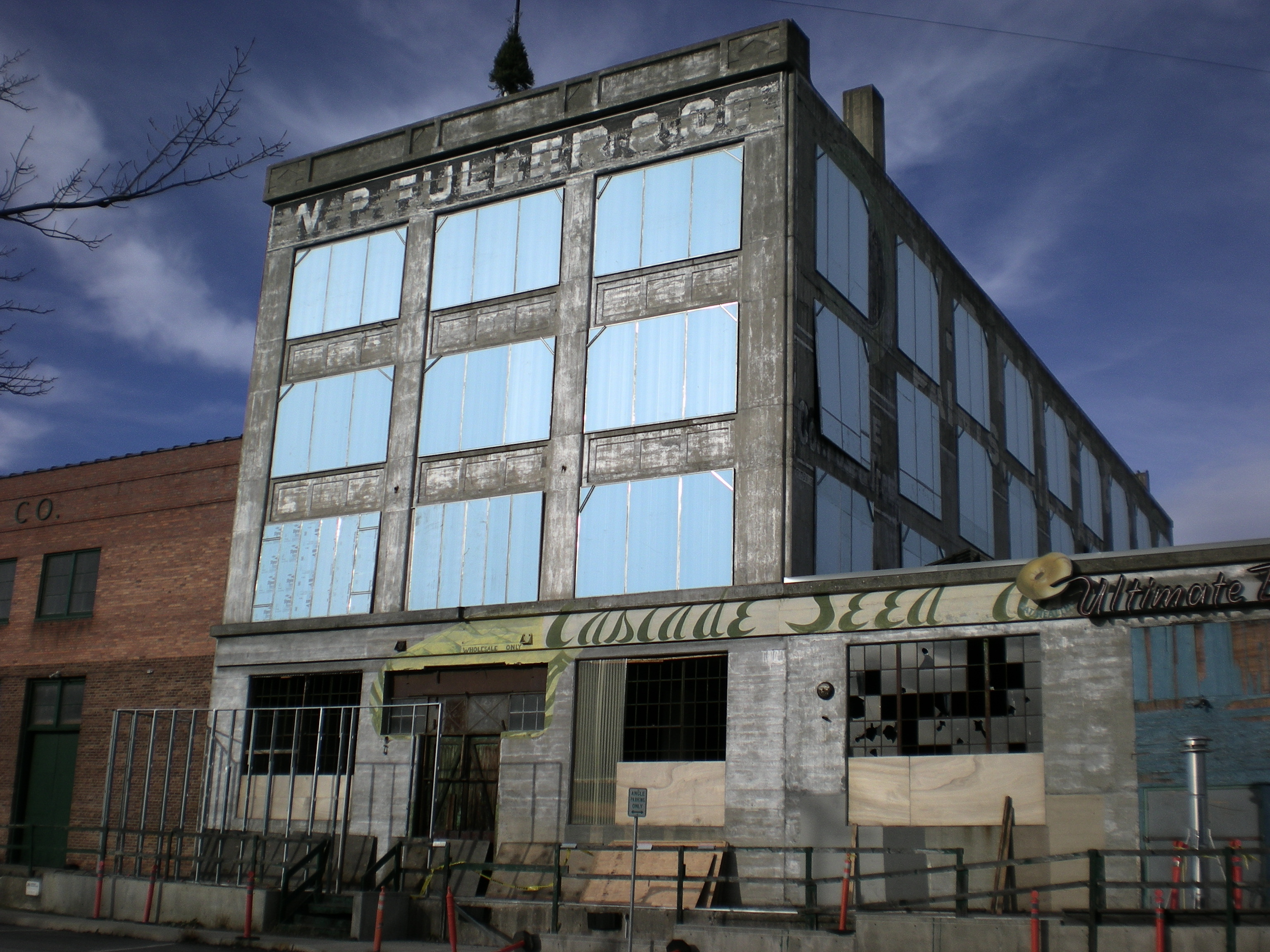
W.P. Fuller and Co. Warehouse, built 1915

Spokane continued to grow rapidly through the early 20th century. By 1900, the population had reached 36,848, and by 1910 had more than tripled, to 104,402. The expansion and growth of Spokane abruptly stopped in the 1910s and was followed by a period of population decline. This growth pattern continued until 1917, when the population reached 150,323. Spokane's slowing economy largely contributed to this decline. Control of regional mines and resources became increasingly dominated by national corporations rather than locals, diverting capital outside of Spokane and decreasing growth and investment opportunities in the city. At the turn of the 20th century, much of the Inland Empire's mining districts were sold to outside interests due to the regions' insufficient capital to fully exploit the mines potential. Local morale was also affected for years by the collapse of the Division Street Bridge early in the morning on December 15, 1915, which killed five people and injured over 20, but a new bridge was built (eventually replaced in 1994).

The 1920 census showed a net increase of just 35 individuals, which actually indicates that thousands left the city when considering the natural growth rate of a population. The 1920s and 1930s saw the similar, but less drastic slow growth of the 1910s, and this change of outlook forced city boosters to market the city as a quiet, comfortable place suitable for raising a family rather than a dynamic community full of opportunity. The Inland Northwest region was heavily dependent on extractive products produced from farms, forests, and mines which experienced a fall in demand. In Coeur d'Alene the Depression years saw a decline in lumber demand and by the mid 1930s about half the woodworkers in northern Idaho were laid off and the surviving mills were producing only 160 million board feet of lumber per year.

Federal-led development that sought to harness the power of the Columbia River resulted in hydroelectric dams, starting with the Bonneville Dam in 1938, which allowed the Pacific Northwest region to transition to new industries. When the construction of the Grand Coulee Dam was finally completed in 1942, the Northwest was designated the preferred location to mass produce sheet aluminum to build materiel for World War II. The government sited two facilities in Spokane, the Mead Works reduction plant in Mead, which molded molten aluminum into large ingots using electric melting pots and the Trentwood Works rolling mill in the Spokane Valley, which would then roll the ingots into sheet metal. Locally, the two aluminum plants as well as a magnesium plant brought 2,100 jobs to the Spokane area and supplied the materials to make airplanes and boats for the war effort. After the war, Kaiser Aluminum leased the facilities in 1946 and eventually purchased them in 1958. In 1950, Washington state accounted for half of all aluminum production in the United States.

In addition to aluminum plants, the government also sited a military distribution center, the Velox Naval Depot, in the Spokane Valley. The decision to locate a naval depot 300 miles inland from the Pacific Ocean was made because it was believed the Cascade Range would help protect it from a potential Japanese attack and because Spokane already had the expensive railroad infrastructure in place to be a good logistics center, notably the Northern Pacific Railway and the Spokane International Railroad. Construction of the depot began in May 1942 and the six warehouses were formally commissioned on January 1, 1943, becoming one of only two inland depots and once in full service, the 5th largest naval supply depot in the United States. The depot still operated at a lower capacity until the start of the Korean War in the 1950s; the facilities were sold later in the decade to a business consortium to eventually become the Spokane Business and Industrial Park.

The transition from rail travel to the personal automobile was complete in 1936 when Spokane's streetcar service was ended, which had a negative impact on the vitality of the downtown core as a destination. The 1950s especially, with the car making travel to and from places more convenient, growth and shopping became decentralized to the outskirts of town, such as NorthTown Mall in 1954, where there was ample parking space, as opposed to downtown where parking was difficult and more scarce even after demolishing buildings to create more space.

=== 1960s and 1970s: Revitalization efforts ===
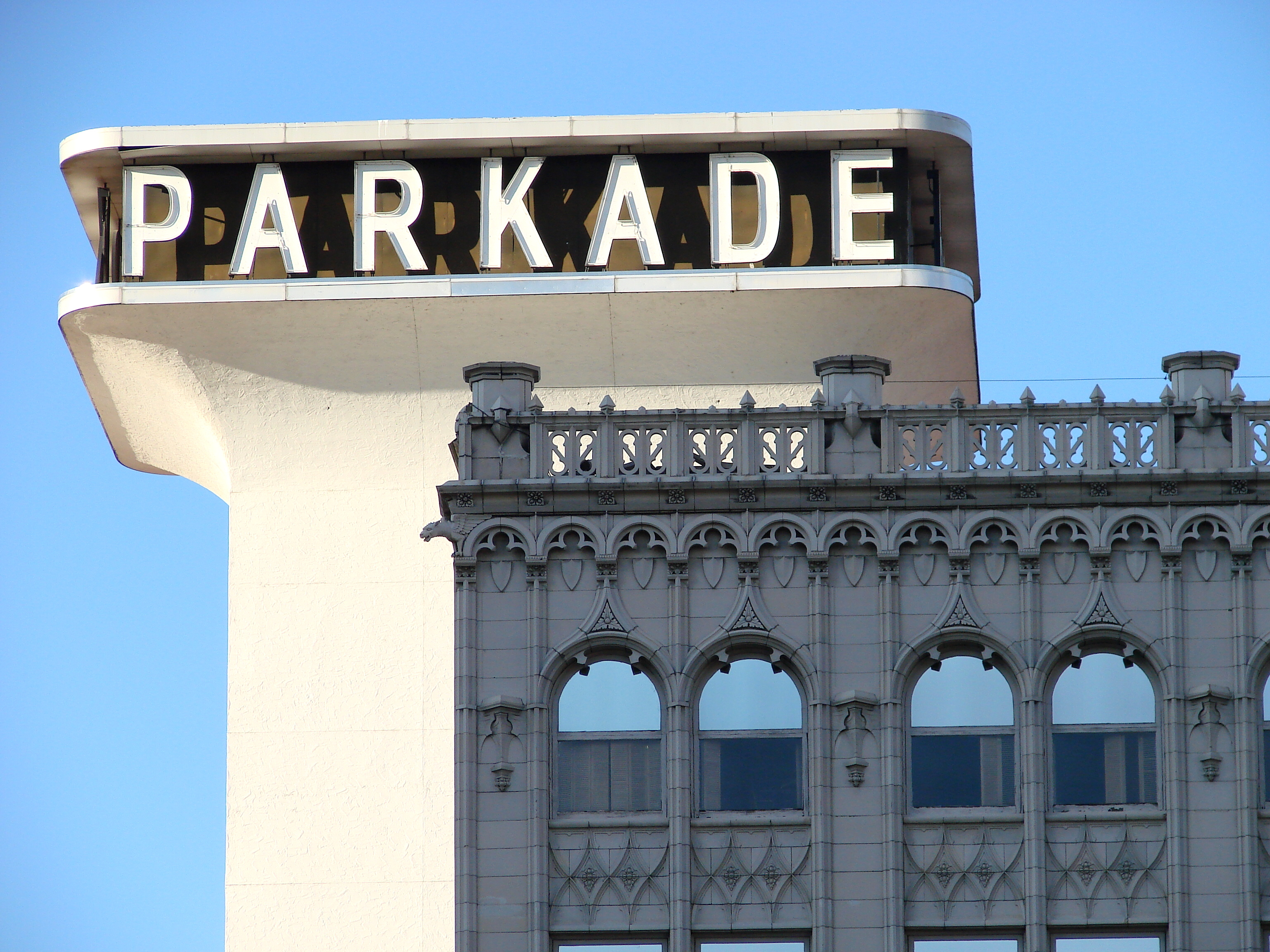
The distinctive sign and building top of The Parkade

After decades of slow growth, Spokane businessmen headed by King Cole formed Spokane Unlimited, an organization that sought to revitalize downtown Spokane. Early but modest success came in the form of a new parking garage in 1965, The Parkade. Soon, focus to revitalize the economy focused on improving Havermale Island, which was dominated by railroad depots and warehouses. A recreation park that would showcase the Spokane falls was the preferred option, and the organization successfully negotiated freeing up the island property and relocating the rail lines. In the early 1970s, Spokane was approaching its one-hundredth birthday, and Spokane Unlimited hired a private firm to start preparations for a celebration and fair. In a report delivered by the firm, the proposal of a world's fair was introduced, which culminated in Expo '74.

==== 1974 World's Fair ====
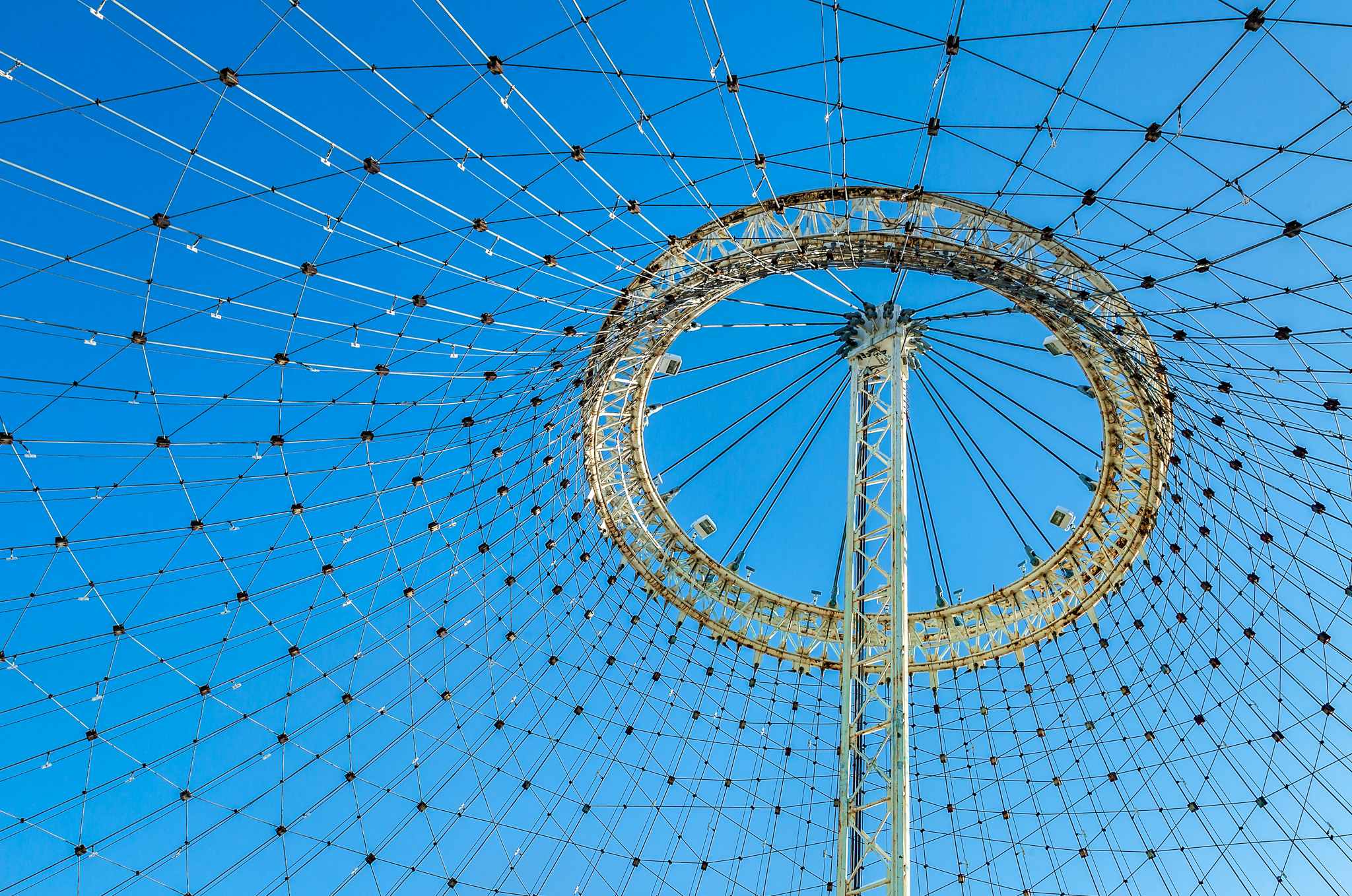
The 1974 World's Fair U.S. Pavilion

Spokane hosted the first environmentally themed World's Fair in Expo '74, becoming the then-smallest city to ever host a World's Fair. Expo '74 also had the distinction of being the first American fair after World War II to be attended by the Soviet Union. This event transformed Spokane's downtown, removing a century of railroad industry that built the city and reinventing the urban core. Just prior to the fair, the Chinatown district was slated for demolition. The Chinatown Asian community thrived until the 1940s, after which its population decreased and became integrated and dispersed, losing its Asian character; urban blight and the preparations leading up to Expo '74 led to Chinatown's eventual demolition. Coinciding with the fair, the River Park Square Mall opened the same week on May 1, 1974, during a dedicated ceremony that featured Governor Daniel J. Evans and Nordstrom officials.

Many of the structures built for the World's Fair are still standing and in use. The United States Pavilion sits next to an IMAX theater, and the Washington State Pavilion became the First Interstate Center for the Arts. The Expo site itself, located on Havermale Island, became the 100-acre (0.40 km^{2}) Riverfront Park, containing, among other features, the U.S. Pavilion, the turn-of-the-20th-century Riverfront Park Looff Carousel, and the Great Northern Railway clock tower, the last remnant of the rail depot that was demolished for Expo '74. The U.S. Pavilion and the clock tower are prominently featured in the park's logo.

The late 1970s was a period of growth for Spokane which led to the construction in the early 1980s of the two tallest buildings in the city, the 18-story Farm Credit Banks Building and the 20-story Seafirst Financial Center, now the Bank of America building.

=== 1980s and 1990s: Recession and diversification ===
The success seen in the late 1970s and early 1980s once again was interrupted by another U.S. recession in which silver, timber, and farm prices dropped. The period of decline for the city lasted into the 1990s and was also marked by a loss of many steady family-wage jobs in the manufacturing sector. In the 1990s, market forces began to impact Kaiser and layoffs, pension cuts, and a 1998-1999 labor strike ensued. In 2000, Kaiser Aluminum, the area's largest industrial employer shuttered the Mead Works plant. Although a tough period, Spokane's economy had begun to benefit from economic diversification, being the home to growing companies such as Key Tronic and having research, marketing, and assembly plants for other technology companies helped lessen Spokane's dependency on natural resources.

== 21st century ==
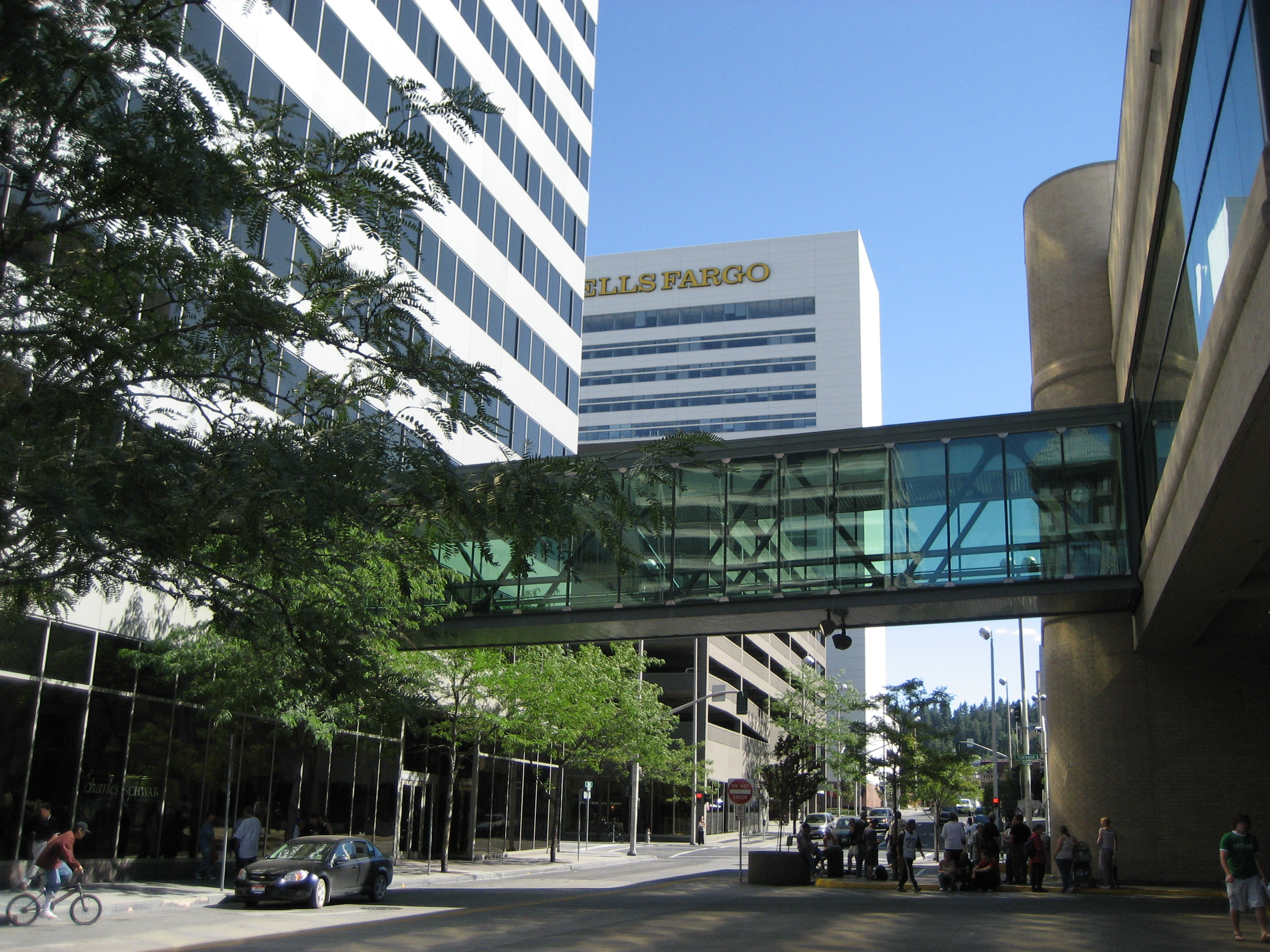
Spokane has an extensive skywalk network

Spokane is still trying to make the transition to a more service-oriented economy in the face of a less prominent manufacturing sector. Developing the city's strength in the medical and health sciences fields has seen some success, resulting in the expansion of the University District with a University of Washington and Washington State University medical school branches. The city faces challenges such as a scarcity of high-paying jobs, pockets of poverty, and areas of high crime.

Following more decades of lackluster growth and the continuing effects of post World War II suburbanization, downtown Spokane had undergone another major rebirth in the decade before the Great Recession, after the redevelopment of the River Park Square Mall in 1999. The $110 million dollar investment in the mall and an its controversial attached parking garage created from a public-private partnership aimed to keep its last anchor tenant, Nordstrom, and some credit the project for sparking a flurry of other projects in the mid-2000s. The historic Davenport Hotel underwent a major renovation in 2002 after being vacant for over 20 years. The project was funded by local entrepreneur Walt Worthy, who also added a Safari-themed 20 story tower to the hotel in 2007. Other major projects included the renovation of the Holley-Mason Building, the building of the Big Easy concert house (renamed the Knitting Factory), the remodeling of the historic Montvale Hotel and Fox Theater (now home to the Spokane Symphony) and the expansion of the Spokane Convention Center. The 2010s saw the building of the WSU Pharmaceutical and Biomedical Sciences Building in 2013 and the Davenport Grand Hotel in 2015 and the renovation of Riverfront Park. The Kendall Yards development on the west side of downtown Spokane is one of the largest construction projects in the city's history. Directly across the Spokane River from downtown, it will blend residential and retail space with plazas and walking trails.

== See also ==
- Timeline of Spokane, Washington

== Historic photographs gallery ==
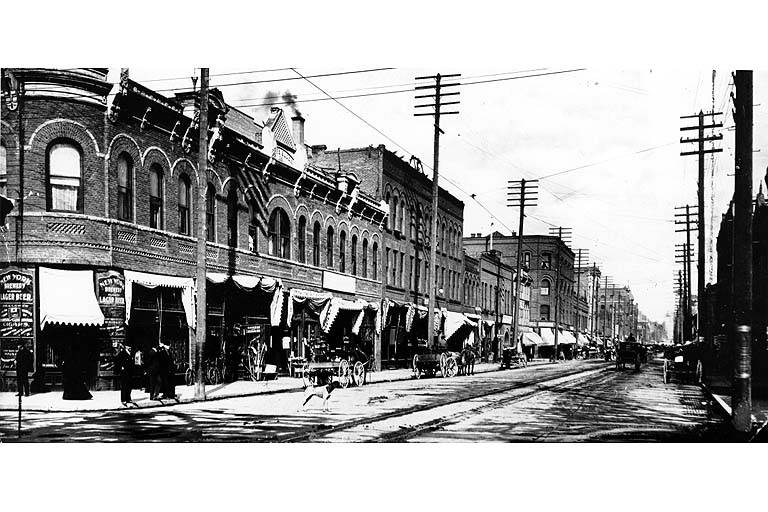
Northwest corner of Front and Washington Streets c. 1895

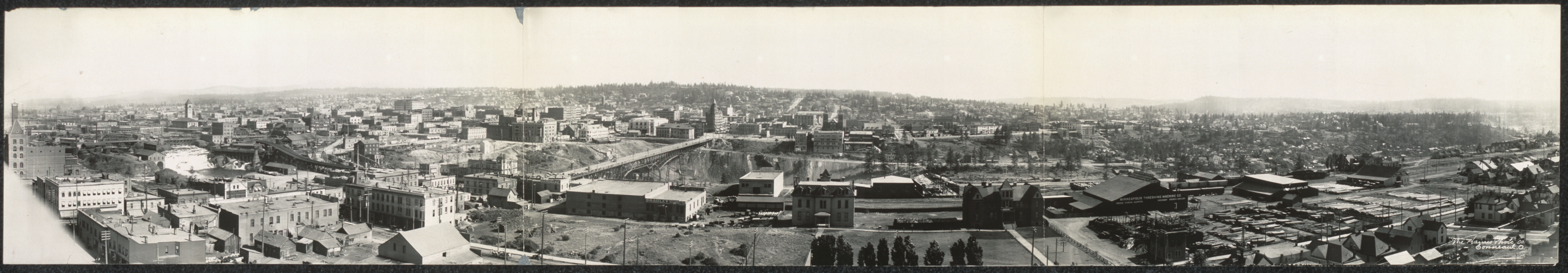
Panorama of Spokane, Washington in 1908.

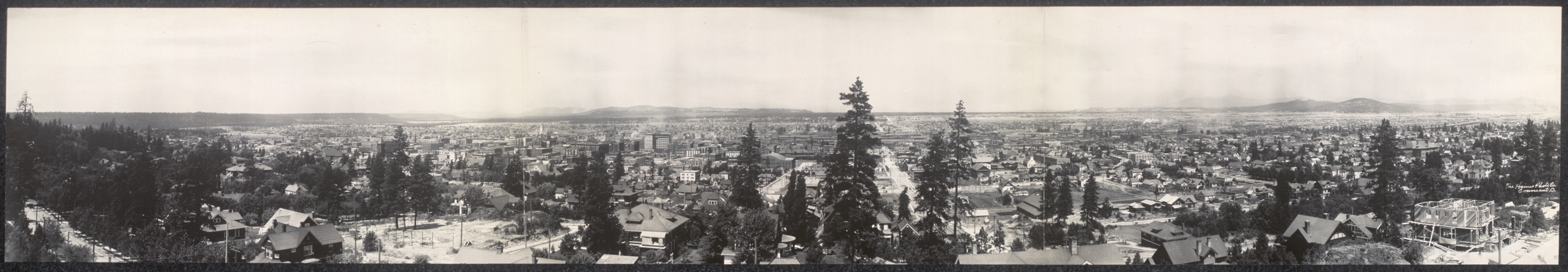
Panorama of Spokane, Washington in 1908.

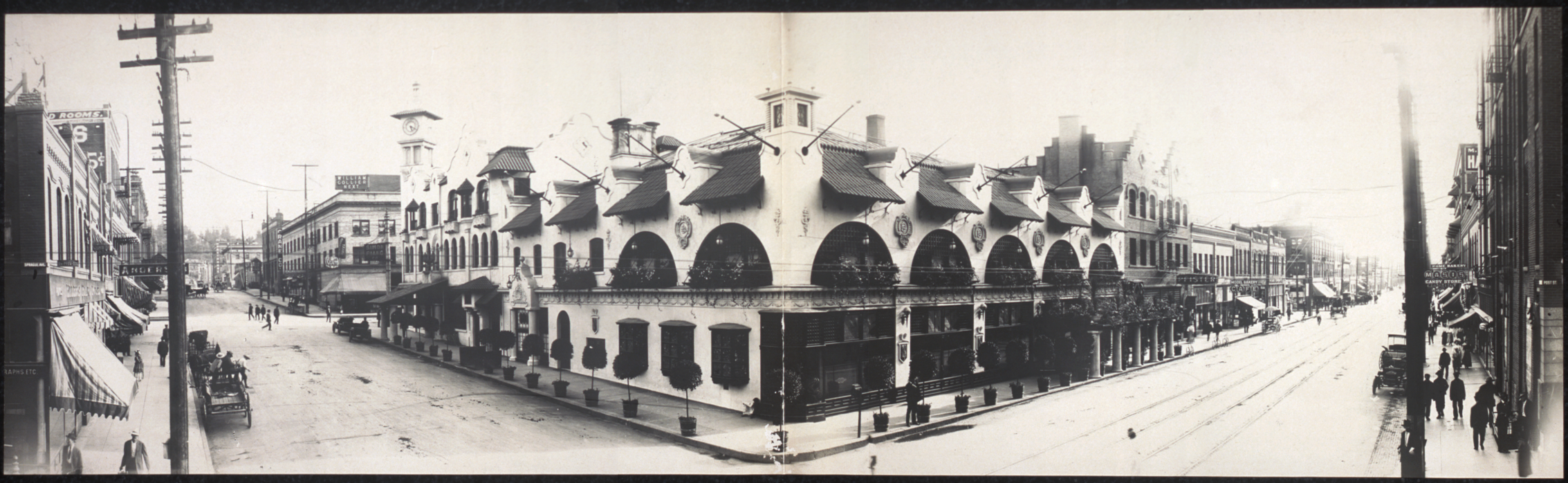
Davenport Restaurant in 1908.

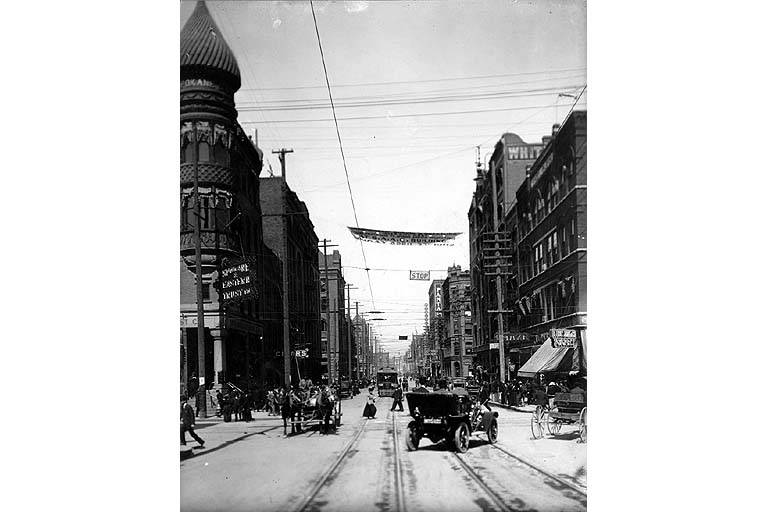
Howard Street looking north c. 1909

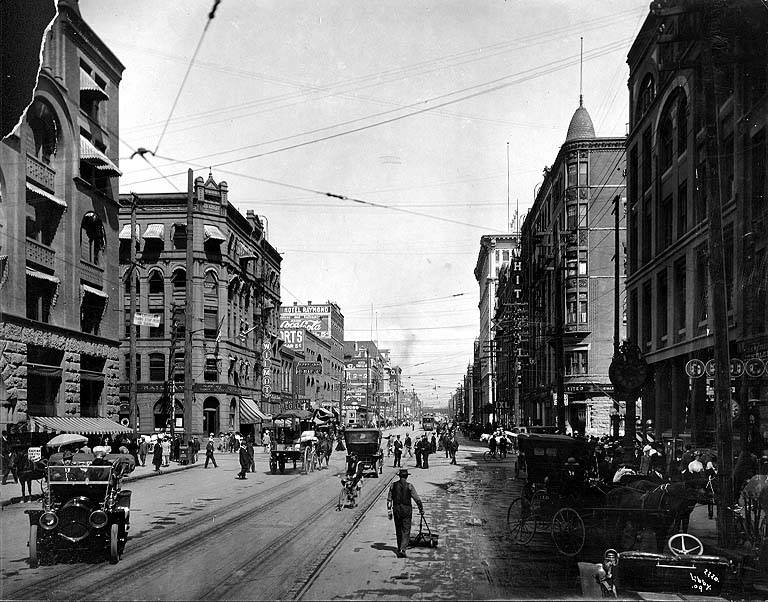
Riverside Ave looking east, 1909

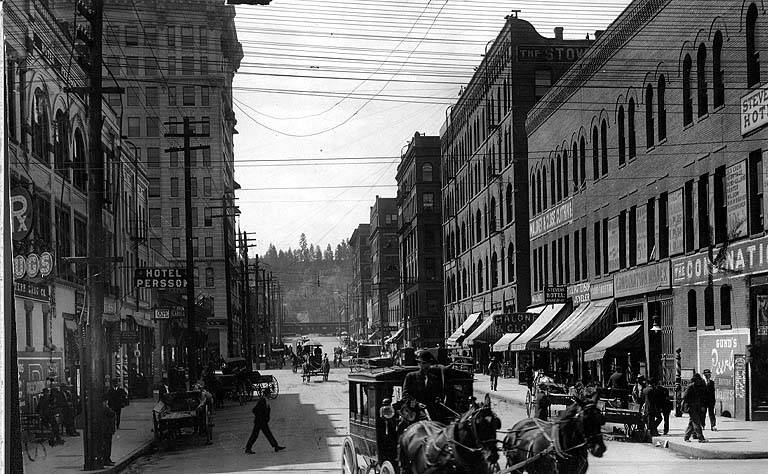
Stevens St looking south from Main Ave c. 1910

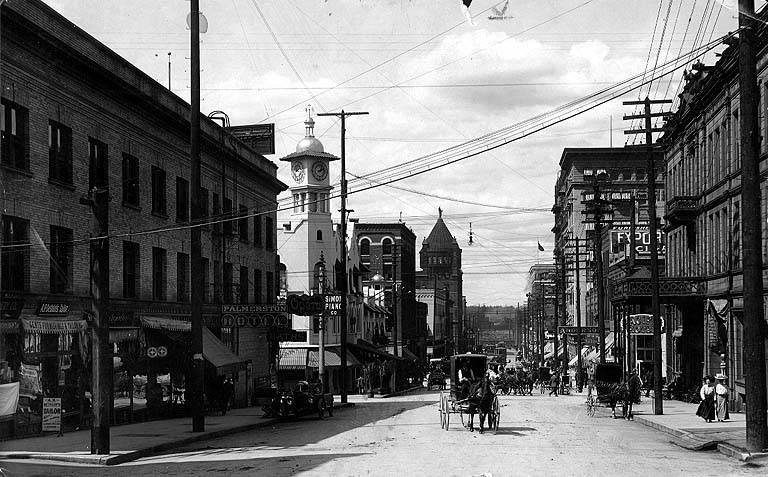
Post Street looking north from 1st Ave c. 1910

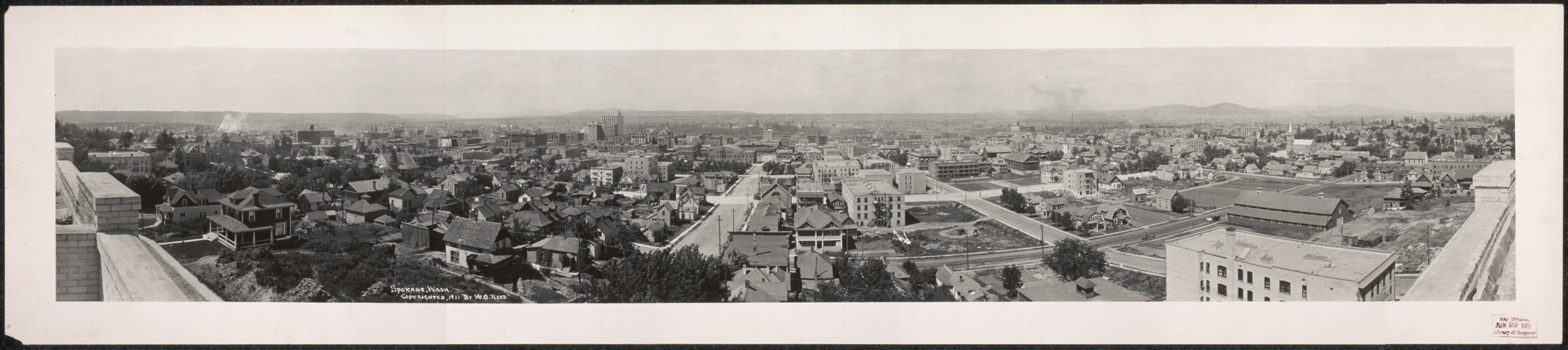
Panorama of Spokane, Washington in 1911.

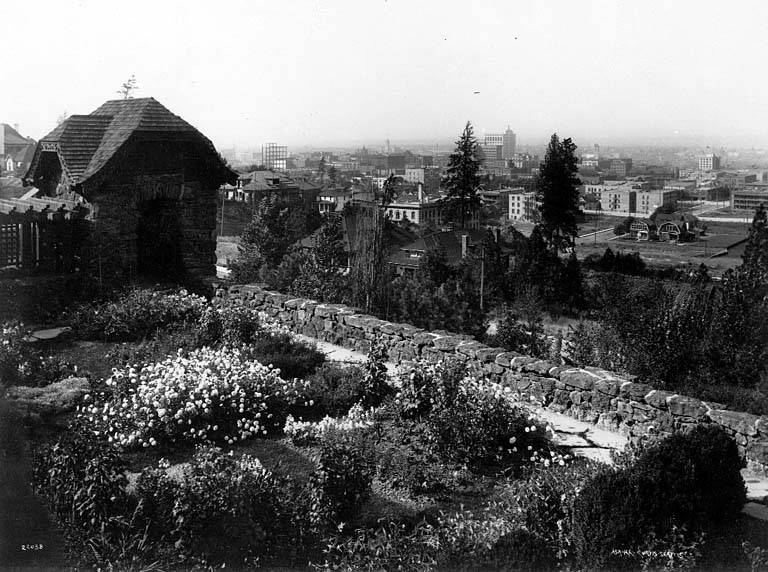
Spokane in 1911.

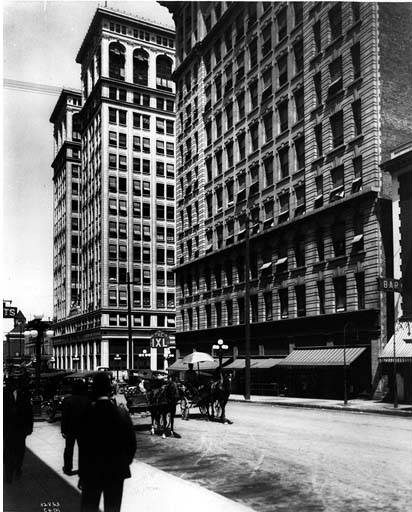
Looking north. Shows IXL Clothing Co. at 425-7 Riverside Ave., and Old National Bank at Riverside Ave., northeast corner of Stevens in 1914.

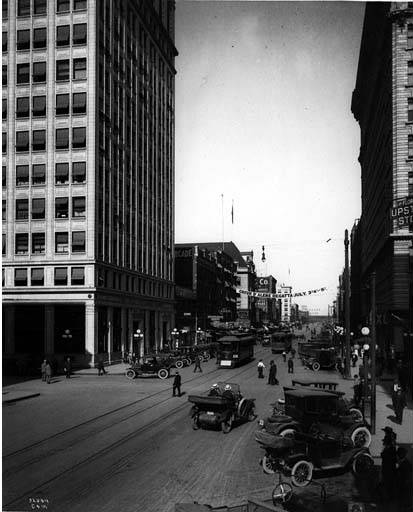
Looking east from Stevens. Old National Bank is on Riverside Ave. at the northeast corner of Stevens, at left in 1914.

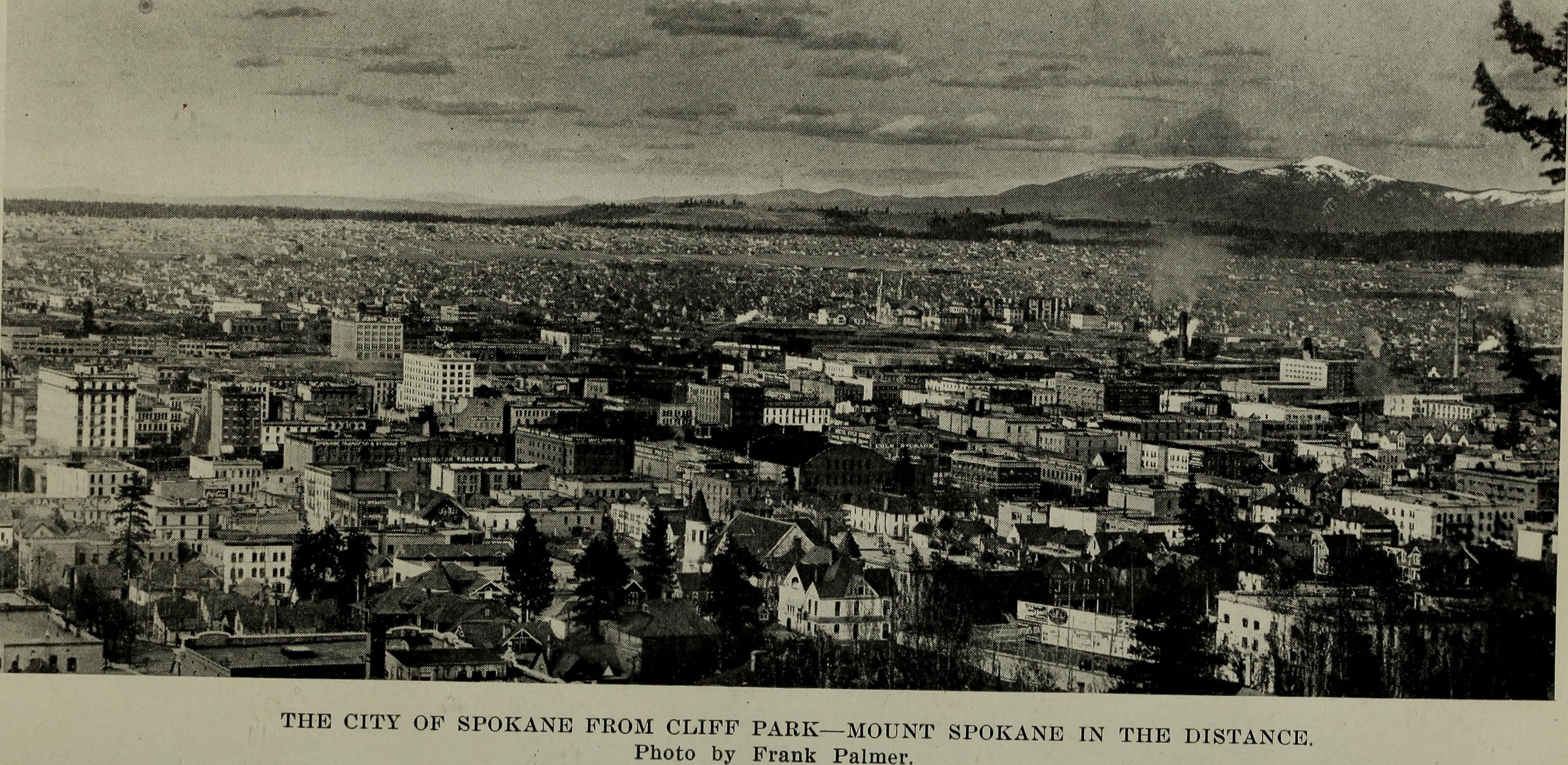
Spokane from Cliff Park, 1915

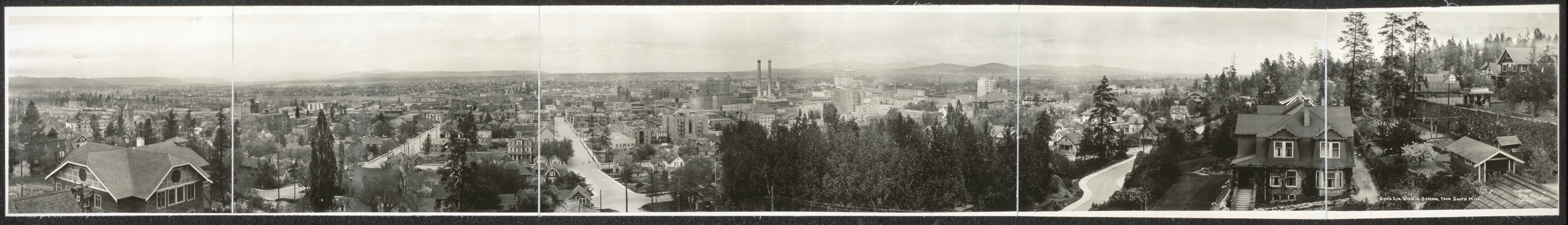
Spokane from the South Hill, 1919

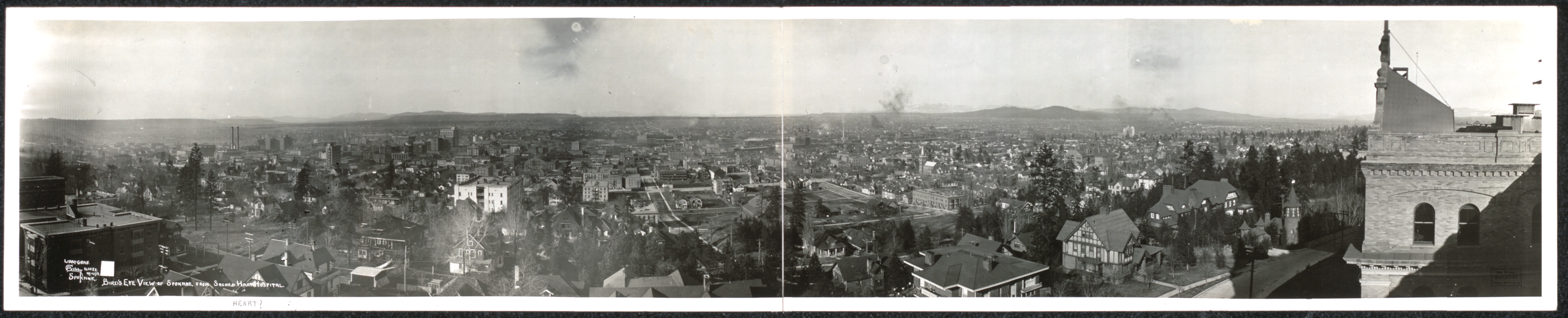
View of Spokane from Sacred Heart Hospital, 1919

== Notes ==
^[a] The name is said to derive from Spukcane, the vocalization of a sound made by a snake, which the Chief of the Spokanes came to call "power from the brain" after pondering it made his head vibrate. It is unknown when the present meaning of the word, "Sun People" replaced this earlier meaning.
^[b] Unbeknownst to them, the Spokane Valley was the only area within 200 miles that could provide passage to the Inland Empire through the Rockies at a reasonable grade.
^[c] The present name, set forth by an 1891 charter reincorporated the city under the name Spokane Falls, stating: "The corporate name of the city is Spokane Falls, and by that name shall have perpetual succession," (Charter, Article I). However, a later article in that same charter, voted on concurrently, changed the name to Spokane.
^[d] Secretary of the Spokane chamber of commerce, John R. Reavis tells of Spokane's significance to the Inland Northwest region as a distributing center (largely the city's raison d'être) in his 1891 Annual Report, writing: "By reason of her geographical position and railroad connections Spokane is fitted as no other city is, or ever can be, to be the distributing center of all that country within a radius of 150 miles, and in some instances territory much farther away. There is no point 150 miles from Spokane that is not at least 225 miles from any other city of 10,000 population. We have about us a territory of 60,000 square miles in extent, to every point of which we are nearer than any other city, to every point of which we have better railroad connections and easier grades than any other city ... We have eight lines of railroad that radiate out in all directions through it, so that shipments made here in the morning can reach any point within its borders by nightfall. We have a telephone system connecting us with almost every shipping town and shipping station within its borders. Goods may be ordered, shipped and received, in most instances, within one day. Never was a city more intimately knit to its surrounding territory than Spokane, and never was one more free from a legitimate rival in trade ..."
^[e] The financing for rebuilding the downtown core came in large part from the infusion of investment from Dutch bankers; this investment was so deep that by 1896, one prominent Dutch mortgage company, the Northwestern and Pacific Hypotheekbank owned a quarter of the city.
^[f] In 1892, the Interstate Commerce Commission agreed with the city after it filed a complaint about these practices, but that decision was struck down by a federal court. In 1906, Spokane sued under the newly passed Hepburn Act, and won on July 24, 1911.

== Bibliography ==
- Creighton, Jeff (2013). Bridges of Spokane. Arcadia Publishing. ISBN 978-0-7385-9635-8.
- Durham, Nelson W. (1912). History of the city of Spokane and Spokane County, Washington: from its earliest settlement to the present time. Vol. 3. Chicago, Illinois: S.J. Clarke Pub. Co. ISBN 978-1-152-77997-6.
- Kensel, W.H. (Spring 1968). "The Early Spokane Lumber Industry, 1871–1910". Idaho Yesterdays. 12 (1). Boise, Idaho: Idaho State Historical Society.
- Kensel, W.H. (April 1969). "Inland Empire Mining and the Growth of Spokane, 1883–1905". Pacific Northwest Quarterly. 60 (2). Seattle, Washington: University of Washington.
- Kensel, W.H. (Spring 1971). "Spokane: The First Decade". Idaho Yesterdays. 15 (1). Boise, Idaho: Idaho State Historical Society.
- Kienholz, M. (1999). Police Files: The Spokane Experience 1853–1995. Mary Kienholz. ISBN 978-0-87062-286-1.
- Leigh, Eric S. (1997). Consumer Rites: The Buying and Selling of American Holidays (DJVU). Princeton University Press. pp. 275–292. ISBN 0-691-01721-2.
- Malone, Michael P. (1996). James J. Hill: Empire Builder of the Northwest. Norman, Oklahoma: University of Oklahoma Press. ISBN 978-0-8061-2860-3.
- Meinig, D.W. (1993). The Shaping of America: A Geographical Perspective on 500 Years of History, Volume 2: Continental America, 1800–1867. Yale University Press. ISBN 0-300-05658-3.
- Phillips, James W. (1971). Washington State Place Names. University of Washington Press. ISBN 0-295-95158-3.
- Ruby, Robert H.; John A. Brown (2006). The Spokane Indians: Children of the Sun. University of Oklahoma Press. ISBN 0-8061-3761-4.
- Schmeltzer, Michael (1988). Spokane: The City and The People. American Geographic Publishing. ISBN 0-938314-53-X.
- Schmidt, Leigh E. (1995). "The Invention of Father's Day: The Humbug of Modern Ritual". Consumer Rites: The Buying & Selling of American Holidays. Princeton, New Jersey: Princeton University Press. ISBN 978-0-691-01721-1.
- Singletary, Robert (2019). Coeur D'Alene Beautiful and Progressive: An Illustrated History of Coeur D'Alene Idaho 1878-1990. Coeur D'Alene, Idaho: Museum of North Idaho. ISBN 9780982522097. OCLC 7366727.
- Spirou, Costas (2011). Urban Tourism and Urban Change: Cities in a Global Economy. Routledge. p. 210. ISBN 978-1-136-85903-8.
- Stratton, David H. (2005). Spokane and the Inland Empire: An Interior Pacific Northwest Anthology. Pullman, Washington: Washington State University Press. ISBN 978-0-87422-277-7.
- Williamson, Jerrelene (2010). African Americans in Spokane. Arcadia Publishing. ISBN 978-0-7385-7011-2.
