= Timeline of Spokane, Washington =

The following is a timeline of the history of the city of Spokane, Washington, USA.

== 19th Century ==
- 1874 - Spokane Falls settlement established in Washington Territory by James N. Glover.
- 1879 - Spokane Times newspaper begins publication.
- 1880 - Population: 350.
- 1881 - November 29: Spokane Falls incorporated as a town and then as a City.
- 1882 - Spokane becomes seat of Spokane County.
- 1883
  - Northern Pacific Railway begins operating.
  - Central School opens.
- 1884 - YMCA established.
- 1887
  - Sacred Heart Hospital opens.
  - Jesuit Gonzaga College established.
- 1889
  - August 4–6: The Great Fire.
  - Union Pacific Railroad begins operating.
  - Town becomes part of the new U.S. State of Washington.
- 1890
  - Town of Spokane Falls renamed "Spokane."
  - Casino Opera House opens (approximate date).
  - Population: 19,922.
- 1891
  - Spokane High School and Holy Names Academy built.
  - Amtrak inter-city rail station opened.
- 1892 - Great Northern Railway built.
- 1893 - September 19: Franz Ferdinand of Austria visits town incognito.
- 1894 - The Spokesman-Review newspaper in publication.
- 1895
  - Spokane County Courthouse built.
  - U.S. military Fort George Wright established near town.
- 1896 - Deaconess Hospital established.
- 1897 - Chamber of Commerce and Spokane Stock Exchange established.
- 1900 - Population: 36,848.

== 20th century ==
- 1904
  - Spokane and Inland Empire Railroad began operations (until 1929).
  - Manito Park and Botanical Gardens created.
- 1905
  - Spokane Public Library building opens.
  - Woman's Club formed.
- 1908 - Portland-Spokane railway begins operating.
- 1909 - Federal building constructed.
- 1910
  - Commission form of government adopted.
  - Population: 104,402.
- 1914
  - Whitworth College active.
  - Davenport Hotel in business.
  - Clemmer Theater built.
- 1915 - Spokane Mountaineers club formed.
- 1916
  - Eastern Washington State Historical Society established.
  - Northwest Museum of Arts and Culture established as the Cheney Cowles Museum.
- 1919 - National Association for the Advancement of Colored People chapter founded.
- 1921 - Civic building opens.
- 1925 - October: National Indian Congress held.
- 1929
  - Spokane Daily Times begins publication.
  - Cambern Dutch Shop Windmill built.
- 1931 - Fox Theater an Art Deco movie theater
- 1932 - Park Inn opens.
- 1933 - Grand Coulee Dam construction begins in vicinity of Spokane.
- 1935 - Benewah Milk Bottle building constructed.
- 1938 - Spokane Art Center opens.
- 1939 - Doyle's Ice Cream Parlor opens.
- 1942 - U.S. military Fairchild Air Force Base begins operating near Spokane.
- 1946
  - Spokane municipal airport active.
  - Yoke's Fresh Market in business.
- 1947 - Spokane Civic Theatre incorporated.
- 1954
  - Spokane Coliseum opens.
  - Cathedral of St. John the Evangelist built.
- 1955 - NorthTown Mall in business.
- 1960
  - Mayor-council-manager form of government adopted.
  - Population: 181,608.
- 1963
  - Spokane Community College established.
  - Protest during the Civil Rights Movement
- 1967 - Spokane Falls Community College opens.
- 1974
  - Spokane Convention Center built.
  - Pavilion Opera House and River Park Square shopping center open.
  - Expo '74 world's fair held in Spokane.
- 1977 - Lilac Bloomsday Run begins.
- 1978
  - Spokane Fire Station Museum established.
  - Riverfront Park established.
- 1981
  - Spokane River Centennial Trail constructed.
  - Spokane Historic Landmarks Commission created.
- 1990 - Spokane Hoopfest begins.
- 1995
  - Community Health Association of Spokane active.
  - Spokane Arena opens.
- 1996 - City website online (approximate date).
- 1997
  - Spokane Preservation Advocates organized.
  - Spokane Valley Mall in business near city.
- 1999 - Spokane Washington Temple opens.

== 21st century ==
- 2003
  - September 23: Gun incident at high school.
  - James E. West becomes the 43rd mayor.
- 2005
  - Cathy McMorris Rodgers becomes U.S. representative for Washington's 5th congressional district.
  - Spokane Valley Heritage Museum established.
- 2007 - Spokane hosts U.S. Figure Skating Championships
- 2010
  - Population: 208,916.
  - Spokane hosts U.S. Figure Skating Championships
- 2011 - January: Bombing attempt.
- 2012 - David Condon becomes the 46th mayor of Spokane.
- 2020
  - Population: 228,989.
  - Nadine Woodward becomes the 47th Mayor of Spokane.
  - Construction began on the Spokane Sportsplex owned by the Spokane Public Facilities District.
  - Construction began on the City Line.

== See also ==
- History of Spokane, Washington
- National Register of Historic Places listings in Spokane
- Timeline of Washington (state) history

other cities in Washington

- Timeline of Seattle
- Timeline of the Tri-Cities, Washington

== Bibliography ==
- Settlers' guide to homes in the northwest, being a hand-book of Spokane Falls, W.T. Spokane Falls: Dallam, Ansell & Edwards. 1885.
- Jonathan Edwards (1900), Illustrated History of Spokane County, W.H. Lever, OCLC 4873043, OL 6912581M
- "Spokane" . Encyclopædia Britannica. Vol. 25 (11th ed.). 1910. pp. 713–714.
- Nelson Wayne Durham (1912), History of the city of Spokane and Spokane County, Washington, Chicago: S.J. Clarke Pub. Co., OCLC 3098070, OL 13528646M
- Spokane City Directory. Polk's Spokane directory1920-1924. Polk. 1913. hdl:2027/uc1.l0065060402.
- Federal Writers' Project (1941), "Spokane", Washington: a Guide to the Evergreen State, American Guide Series, Portland, Or.: Binfords & Mort, hdl:2027/uc1.b3624995 – via HathiTrust
- W. Hudson Kensel (1969). "Inland Empire Mining and the Growth of Spokane, 1883-1905". Pacific Northwest Quarterly. 60 (2): 84–97. JSTOR 40488655.
- Dwayne A. Mack (2003). "Crusade for Equality: Spokane's Civil Rights Movement during the Early 1960s". Pacific Northwest Quarterly. 95.
- Dwayne A. Mack (2014). Black Spokane: The Civil Rights Struggle in the Inland Northwest. University of Oklahoma Press. ISBN 978-0-8061-4712-3.
