= Dong River =

Dong River (東江, East River) may refer to:

- Dong River (China) (Dongjiang), a river in China's Guangdong Province
- Dong River (South Korea) (Donggang), a river in South Korea's Gangwon Province

== See also ==
- East River (disambiguation)
- Đồng Nai river
- Vàm Cỏ Đông River
