= East River Park (disambiguation) =

East River Park, or John V. Lindsay East River Park, is on the Lower East Side of Manhattan, New York, U.S.

East River Park may also refer to the following parks in New York, U.S.:

- Marsha P. Johnson State Park, or East River State Park
- Astoria Park, also known as East River Park, in Queens
- Carl Schurz Park, originally East River Park, in Manhattan

== See also ==
- East River (disambiguation)
- River Park (disambiguation)
