= East River (disambiguation) =

East River is a tidal strait in New York City.

East River may also refer to:

== Settlements ==
- East River, Nova Scotia, Canada
- East River (South Dakota), United States

== Water courses ==
=== Canada ===
- East River of Pictou, Nova Scotia
- George River (Quebec), formerly known as East River
- Hillsborough River (Prince Edward Island), also known as the East River

=== United States ===
- East River (Colorado)
- East River (Florida)
- East Bay River, Florida, also known as East River
- East River (Minnesota)
- East River (Virginia)
- East River (New River tributary), in Virginia and West Virginia
- East River (Wisconsin)

=== Other places ===
- Dong River (China)
- Dong River (South Korea)

== Other uses ==
- "East River", a 1979 song by Brecker Brothers
- East River (film), a 2008 short film

== See also ==
- East River Park (disambiguation)
- East Twin River (disambiguation)
- Eastern River
