= Park River =

Park River may refer to:

== Towns ==
- Park River, North Dakota

== Rivers ==
- Park River (Connecticut)
- Park River (North Dakota)
- Park River (New Zealand)
- Big Muddy Creek (Missouri River tributary), also known as Park River

== See also ==
- River Park (disambiguation)
