= East Twin River =

East Twin River may refer to:

- East Twin River (Washington), US
- East Twin River (Wisconsin), US

== See also ==
- East River (disambiguation)
