= River Park =

River Park may refer to:

- River Park, Sacramento, California, a neighborhood
- River Park, Florida, a census-designated place
- River Park (Fresno, California), a shopping center in Fresno, California
- River Park (Bratislava), a multifunction center on the Danube bank in Bratislava

== See also ==
- Park River (disambiguation)
- River Park Historic District, a historic district in Milford, Connecticut
- River Park Hospital, a hospital in Huntington, West Virginia
- River Park Sporting, a soccer team in Sacramento, California
- River Park Square, a shopping mall in Spokane, Washington
- River Park Towers, residential skyscrapers in the Bronx, New York City
