= Chinatown, Spokane, Washington =

Spokane Chinatown
- Former Neighborhood of Spokane
- Location within Spokane riverfront area
- Coordinates: 47°39′36.5″N 117°24′52.8″W
- Country: United States
- State: Washington
- County: Spokane County
- City: Spokane, Washington
- ZIP Code: 99202
- Area code: 509

A fair sized Chinatown existed in the U.S. city of Spokane, Washington, for years that started when the railroad came through in 1883. It consisted of a network of alleys between Front Avenue (today's Spokane Falls Boulevard) and Main Avenue that stretched east from Howard Avenue to North Division Street. The Chinese population gradually thinned out until the alley became abandoned by the 1940s. Virtually all that remained of the Chinatown alleys were demolished as part of construction projects spurred by Spokane's Expo '74.

== History ==
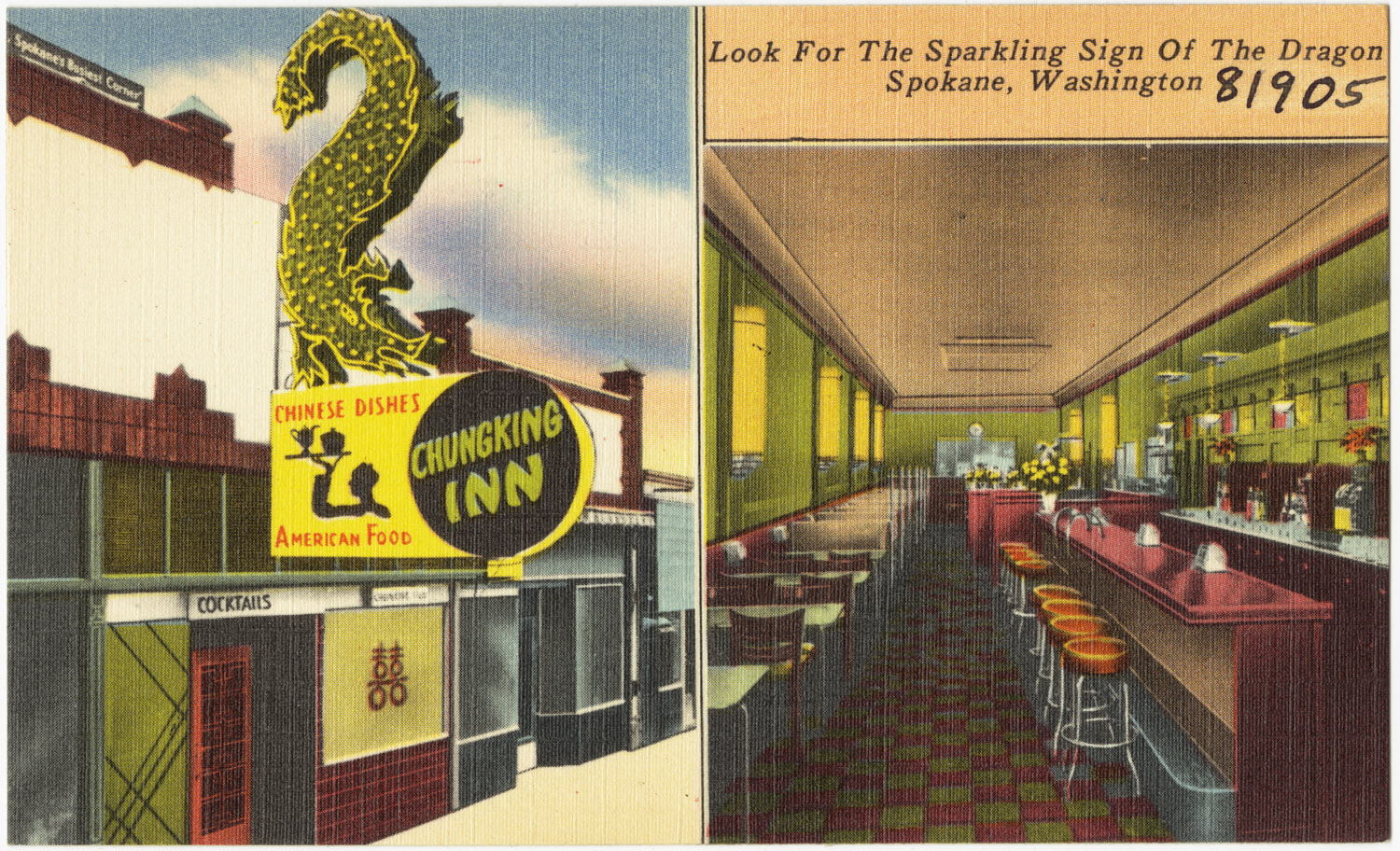
The Chungking Inn formerly at 710 W. Sprague

In the 1880s, immigrants from China who had come to work on the railroad established a "bustling Chinatown" in Spokane which was as big as three to four blocks "... stretching from Howard Street to Bernard Street ..." parallel to what is now Spokane Falls Boulevard. It was also known by the nickname "Japanese Alley" or "Trent Alley". More sources said that the Chinatown swelled even more during the Franklin Delano Roosevelt era with the internment of Asian peoples due to the war against Japan. An old newspaper article shows that an annual convention for the Chinese Hip Sing organization was held in 1924.
