= James N. Glover =

American politician, banker, and mayor (1838–1921)

James Glover
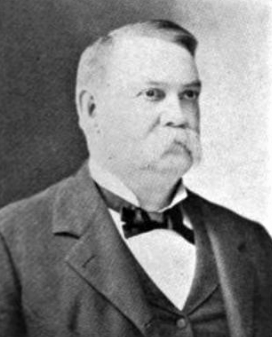
- Official portrait, 1912

2nd mayor of Spokane, Washington
- In office 1883–1885
- Preceded by: Robert W. Forrest
- Succeeded by: Anthony M. Cannon

Member of the Spokane City Council
- In office 1883
- In office 1898
- In office 1902

Member of the Salem City Council
- In office 1868

Marshal of the City of Salem
- In office 1868

Personal details
- Born: March 15, 1838 Lincoln County, Missouri, U.S.
- Died: November 18, 1921 (aged 83) Spokane, Washington, U.S.
- Spouses: Susan Tabitha Crump (m. 1868; div. 1892) Esther Emily Leslie (m. 1892)

James Nettle Glover (March 15, 1838 – November 18, 1921) was a politician, banker, mayor, and is considered to be the founder of the city of Spokane, Washington. He served as the second mayor of Spokane from 1883 to 1885.

== Biography ==
Glover in 1917

James Nettle Glover was born on March 15, 1838, in Lincoln County, Missouri. He and his family moved to Oregon in 1849 from the Oregon Trail. He eventually settled in Salem, Oregon, and served on the council there in the late 1860s. In 1871, two squatters, James Downing and Seth Scranton, had built a sawmill at the south bank of the Spokane Falls on the Spokane River. Glover and his partner, Jasper N. Matheny, recognized the investment potential and bought the claim of 160 acres (0.65 km^{2}) and the sawmill from Downing and Scranton. Later, Glover became one of Spokane's first bankers. Glover became the cities second mayor, and served from 1883 to 1885. He was also a part of the city council from the early 1880s to the early 1900s.

== Personal life ==
Glover married Susan Tabitha Crump on September 1, 1868. They divorced on March 31, 1892 and did not have any children together. He married Esther Emily Leslie on April 2, 1892, they had no children together, and remained married until his death in 1921.
