= Dong River (South Korea) =

River in South Korea

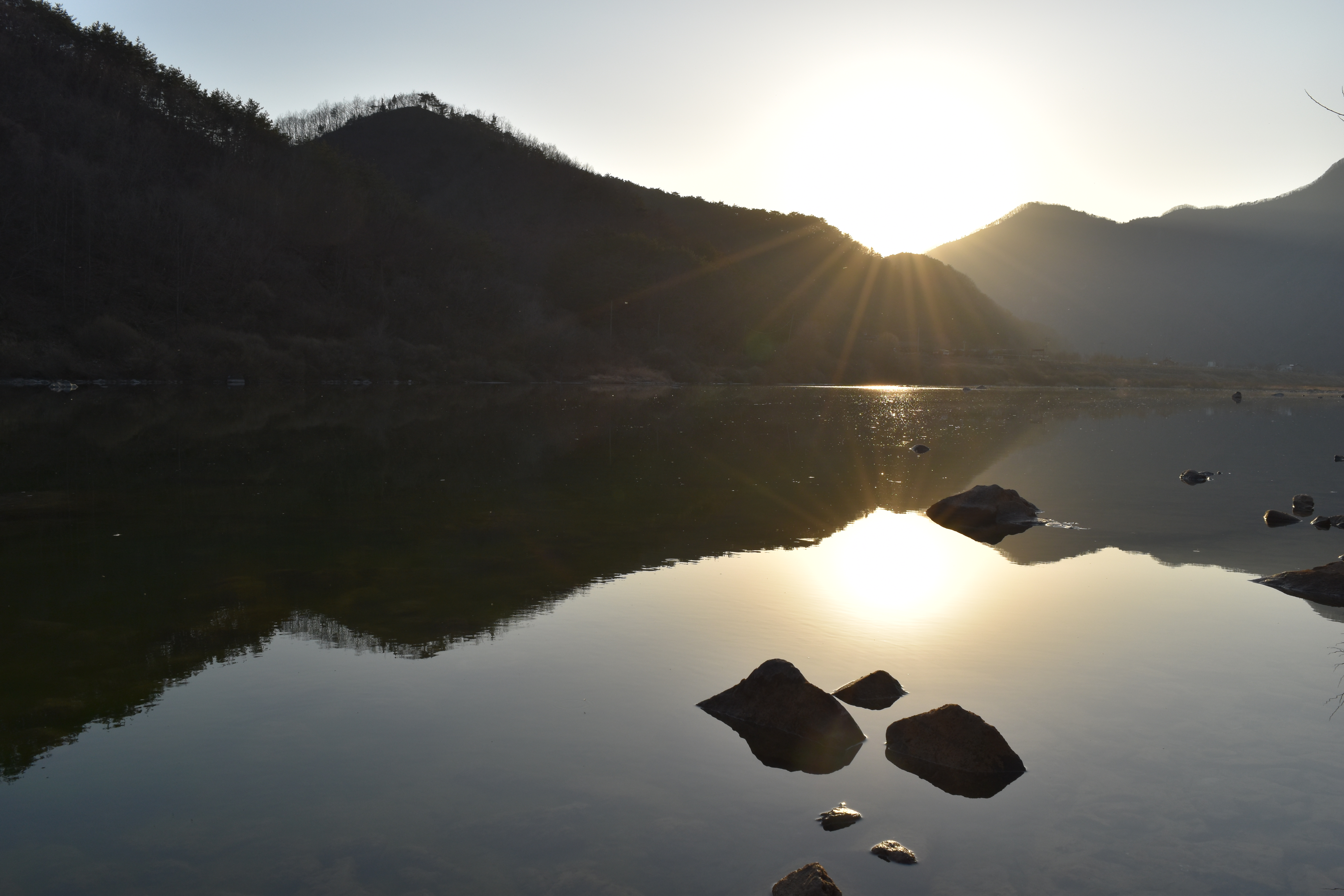
- Dong river flows near Yeongwol

Korean name
- Hangul: 동강
- Hanja: 東江
- RR: Donggang
- MR: Tonggang

The Dong River (Korean: 동강) is a river in Yeongwol and Jeongseon county, South Korea. It remains the cleanest river and region in a country that has undergone sharp industrial development. It is a tributary to the South Han River that covers an area of 60 km. The Donggang River follows a snake-like path splitting the chiselled cliffs surrounding it. Many tourists visit the area to see rare animals such as otters, Mandarin ducks, and Chinese scop owls. It is largely recommended to experience rafting in Donggang. However, the tourists are getting together year by year and water pollution is concerned within river area.

== Formation of river ==
The Donggang River area is formed by limestone layers formed about four hundred and fifty million years ago. It is reported to have formed present topography by the effect of faulting and folding about 2 hundred million years ago. Donggang River shows the topography of the incised meander river affected by river movement for several hundred years.

Presently, accumulation and erosion caused by river movement are continuously in progress.

== Environment ==
Twelve kinds of natural products such as otter, eoreumchi, mandarin duck, kestrel, and brown hawk owl are living in the Donggang River area. Also, uncountable kinds are the ones that are being preserved, and animals and plants that are indigenous to Korea are taking place. Also, the so-called Donggang River wind flow, which faces the sky as it grows, found in this area has not been reported in academics. In February 2000, the white-tailed eagle, a rare bird of the world, at Hapsumeori, the lower reaches of Donggang River. Thus, the ecological characteristics of Donggang River can be explained in 2 words, rarity.

== People and culture ==
Since the New Stone Age, people started living in the Donggang River area. And, as they were living in that area until now, they formed a unique culture. Bawigeuneul remains of Goseong-ri, Sogol remains of Deokcheon-ri and remains of Unchi-ri is the New Stone Age remains of Donggang River area; Sogol remains of Deokcheon-ri, remains of Unchi-ri, dolmen remains of Goseong-ri, dolmen remains of Jejang, dolmen remains of Gyuram-ri, and dolmen remains of Samok-ri are of the Bronze Age.

Jeongseon Arirang, the representative of the famous musical culture of this area, is formed with raft culture. It is a precious document that shows the lifestyle of people in the Donggang River area. Also, in the Donggang River area, legends and folk tales of dragon (yong in Korean)

About 2000 people of 600 homes are living in 10 ris (Samok-ri, Geoun-ri, Munsan-ri, Maha-ri, Gihwa-ri, Deokcheon-ri, Goseong-ri, Unchi-ri, Gasu-ri, Gyuram-ri, and Yongtan-ri). Most of them engage in farming. Some of them made farming fields even in rough mountain hills.

Most houses in the Donggang River area are built with old yellow clay walls, except for a few open houses.
