= River Park Square =

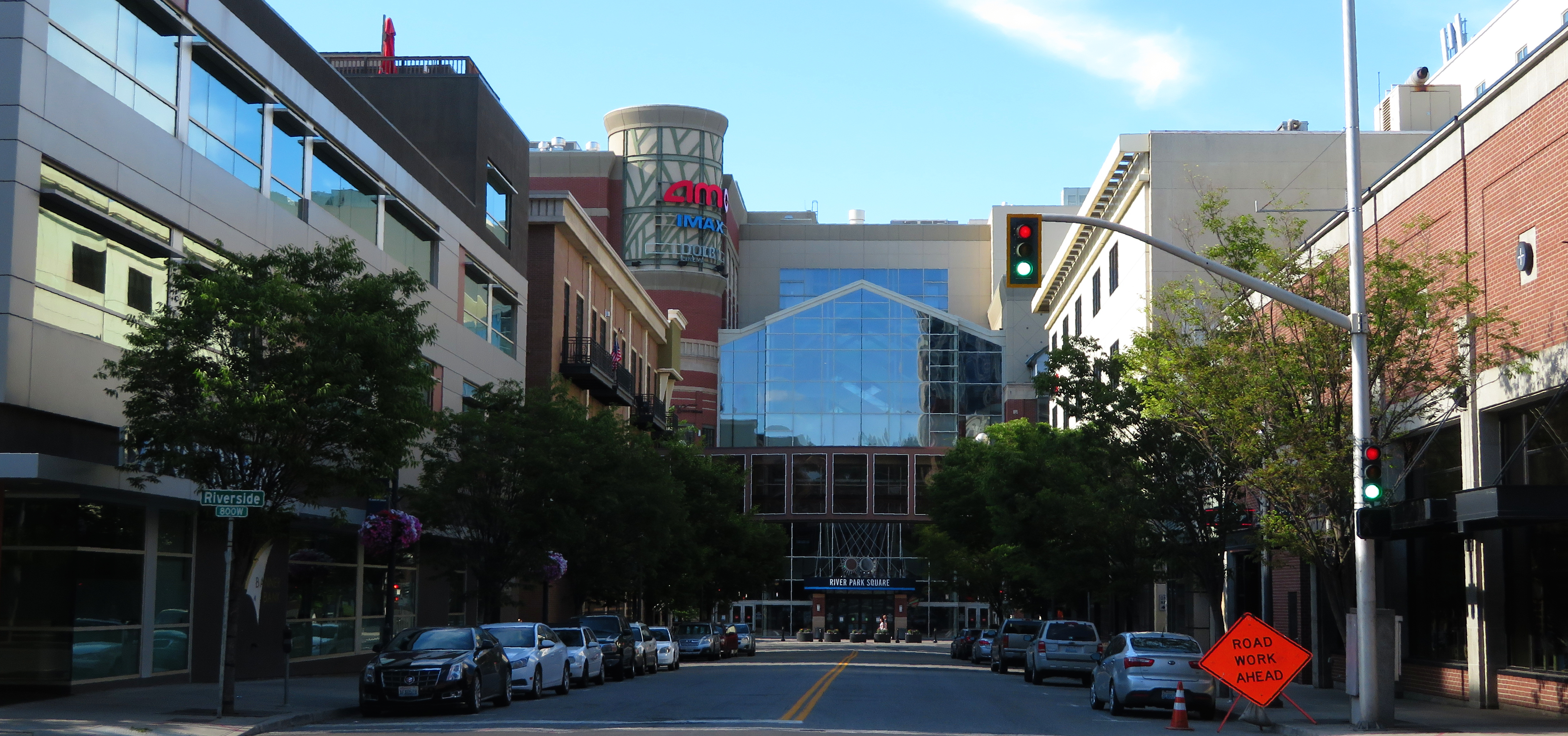
- River Park Square Mall's Post Street entrance
- Location: Spokane, Washington, United States
- Coordinates: 47°39′34.52″N 117°25′24.07″W
- Address: 808 West Main
- Opened: May 1, 1974 (original); August 20, 1999 (redeveloped)
- Owner: Cowles Company
- Num. of stores: 55
- Num. of anchor tenants: 1
- Floor area: 420,000
- Floors: 5
- Parking: 1,300
- Public transit: Spokane Transit Authority
- Website: riverparksquare.com

River Park Square is a shopping mall and entertainment complex in Spokane, Washington. The shopping center was originally opened in 1974. Following years of decline, the center was redeveloped in 1999 using public and private funds in an effort to revitalize downtown Spokane. The mall, privately owned by Cowles Company, is anchored by Nordstrom and AMC Theatres.

== History ==
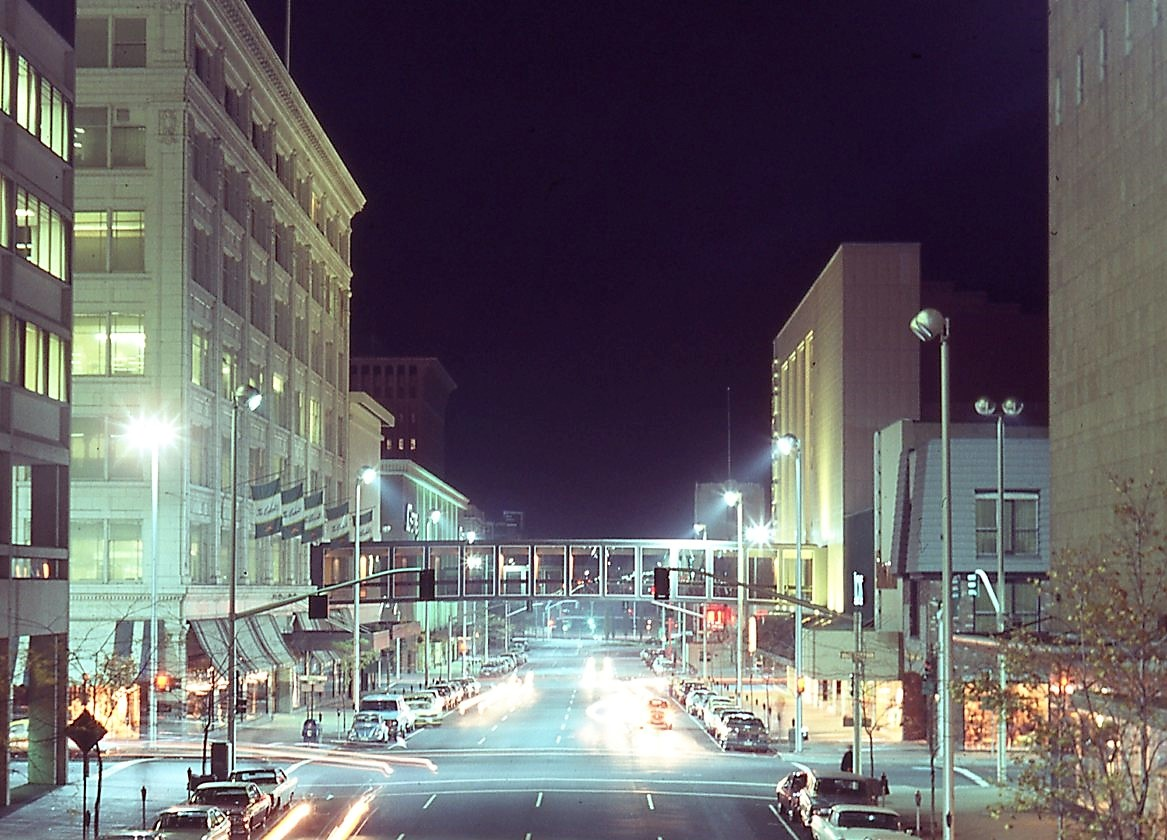
The Crescent (left) and skywalk crossing Main Ave., 1978

The original River Park Square was opened on May 1, 1974, during a dedicated ceremony that featured Governor Daniel J. Evans and Nordstrom officials. Its opening was scheduled for the same week as the opening of Expo '74, a world's fair hosted by Spokane. In 1978, an expansion added a 55,000 square-foot enclosed second level and two skywalks connecting the mall to the JCPenney and Nordstrom stores. When completed, the shopping center contained 800,000 square-feet of retail space with The Crescent, JCPenney, and Nordstrom as anchor stores. In February 1984, a new skywalk was constructed to connect the center to The Bon Marché, which was located east of the complex. The addition of the skywalk added 20,000 square-foot of retail space to the center.

In January 1987, Osco Drug closed its drug store at the shopping mall. The drug store, which previously operated as PayLess Drug and Skaggs, had been located in downtown Spokane since 1942. The space was quickly replaced by Thrifty Drug in November 1987. In April 1994, PayLess Drug, which acquired the pharmacy from Thrifty, closed for good.

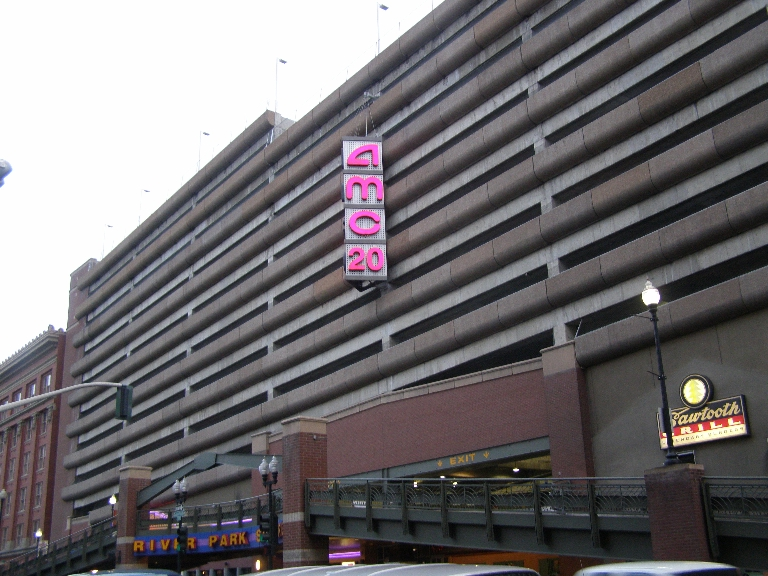
The mall parking garage

In 1991, JCPenney closed its store at River Park Square after relocating to the newly renovated NorthTown Mall. Burlington Coat Factory moved into the space in 1994 and remained at the mall until moving to a larger location in 2001. In April 1992, the shopping mall suffered a big loss when Frederick & Nelson, which acquired The Crescent in 1988, liquidated and closed its remaining stores.

In 1995, the Spokane City Council announced that it would seek a $23.8 million federal loan to build a larger Nordstrom store in an attempt to bring shoppers back to the ailing shopping center. On February 12, 1998, Nordstrom signed a 20-year lease on a new building at River Park Square. Construction began in April 1998. The old Nordstrom building was demolished shortly after for new retail space. The redeveloped $110 million shopping center opened on August 20, 1999 to a crowd of about 2,000 people. The new development created one large shopping center in the heart of downtown and an attached parking garage, which became controversial for its use of public funds.

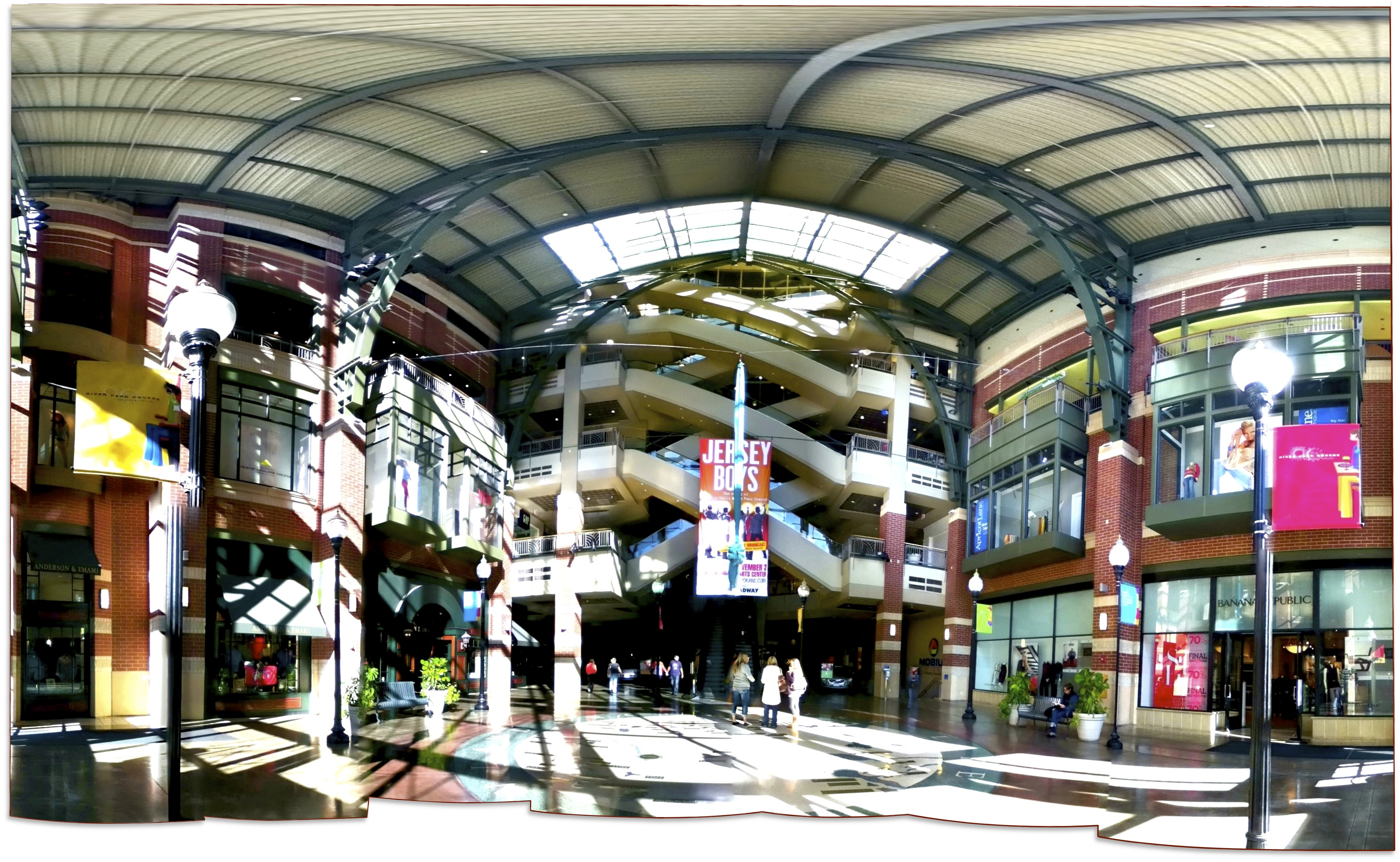
The atrium in 2012

The mall has expanded in the 2010s with the acquisition of the Saad building in 2015 on the corner of Main and Wall Street being replaced with a 10,000 square foot Urban Outfitters location and in the spring of 2016 with the acquisition of the shuttered Macy's building across from Wall Street, which was converted into luxury apartments with first floor retail. Also in 2015, the mall added a dining area extension that overlooks the Main Street atrium dubbed "The Landing". A Nike Factory Store would later occupy the new 12,000 square foot retail portion of the former Macy's, now called “The M” in reference to the buildings former tenants, The Bon Marché and Macy's. A Flatstick Pub was added as an additional tenant in 2019. Lego opened their first store in eastern Washington to large crowds on November 10, 2023 in a 3003-foot space fronting Main Avenue.

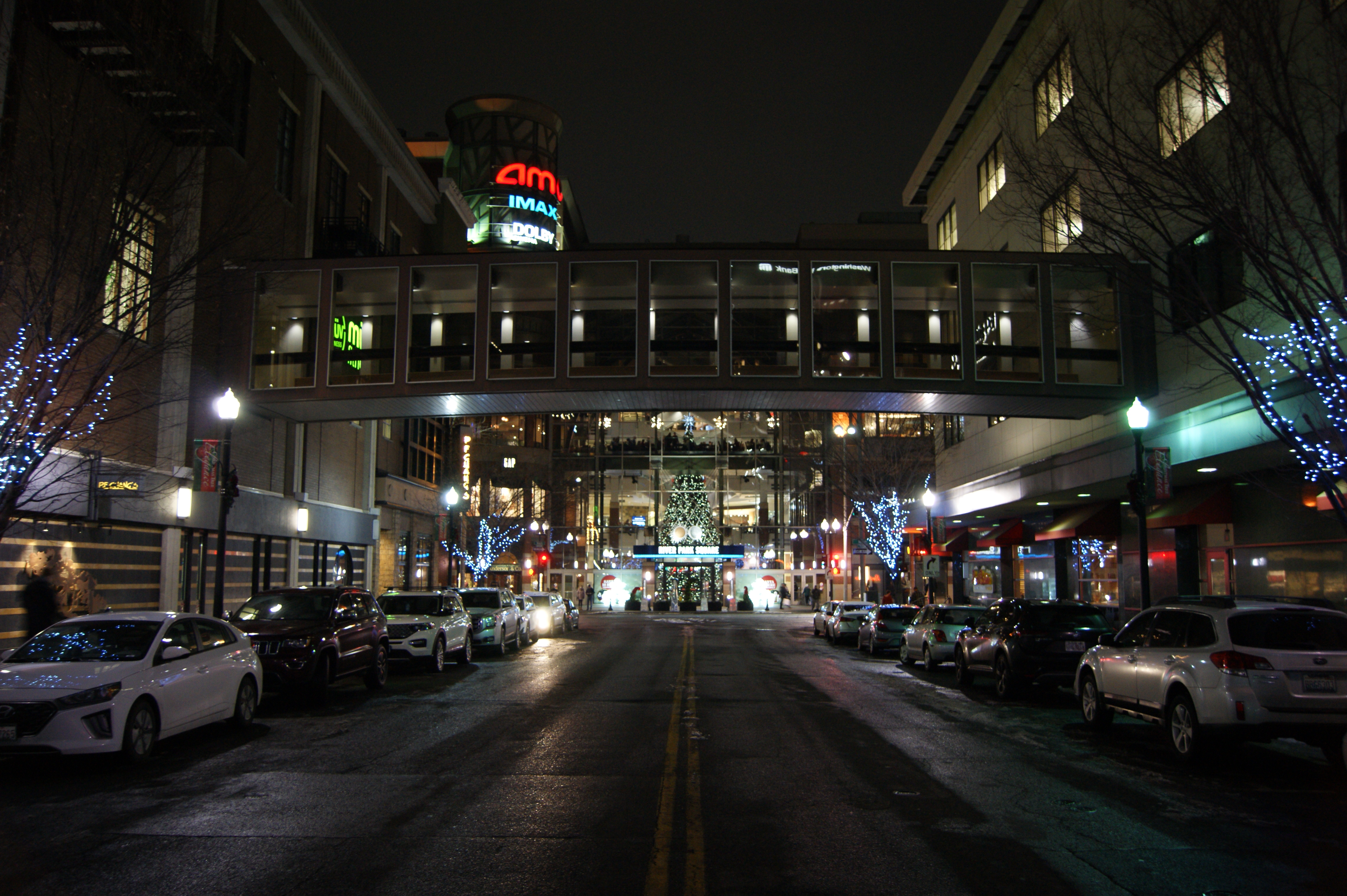
The Post St. entrance with Christmas decorations and "The Landing" visible

Being an urban, mixed use mall has been beneficial to it. Its proximity to other foot traffic generating attractions such as Riverfront Park, a public library, and eateries and having a revenue generating parking garage downtown has allowed River Park Square to weather a deteriorating retail outlook that has challenged suburban outlet malls; River Park Square's customer base is also more recession resistant as it has more high end luxury stores and fashion brands such as an Apple store, Nordstrom, and Banana Republic than do typical outlet malls. Other notable tenants include Anthropologie, The North Face, Sephora, Lush and Lego.
