= List of public art in Bend, Oregon =

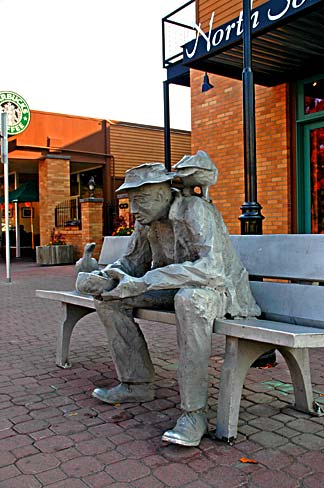
The Traveler (nicknamed "Art") by Richard Beyer in downtown Bend, Oregon

Public art in Bend, Oregon, in the United States, has been facilitated in part by Art in Public Places (AiPP), since 1973.

== List of artworks ==
- Art (also known as The Traveler) by Richard Beyer, installed 1982, Corner of Wall Street and Franklin Avenue
- Atilt, Sundra and Garden Gate by Mel Katz, installed 2002, Newport Avenue and 14th Street Roundabout
- Bend Gate by Lee Kelly, installed 1998, Bend Parkway
- Big Ears by Joe Halko, installed 2001, Century Drive and Simpson Avenue Roundabout
- Brandis Square by Huston Barber and Barrett Turner, installed 1986, Wall Street and Greenwood Avenue
- Bueno Homage to the Buckaroo by Danae Miller, installed 2005, Butler Market Road and 8th Street Roundabout
- Butte Creek Pass by Douglas Campbell Smith, installed 1977, Central Oregon Community College
- Cascade Landscape by Bruce West, installed 1991, Drake Park
- Centennial Logger by Jerry Werner, installed 2004, Reed Market Road and Farewell Bend Park Roundabout
- Centennial Planter by Jerry Werner, installed 2004, Reed Market Road and Alderwood Circle Roundabout
- Central Oregon Landscape by Mirra Meyer, installed 1977, Deschutes County Library
- Concrete Planters by Marge Hammond, installed 1978, Colorado Bridge
- Dancing Circle by Margaret Puckette, installed 1995, Rosie Bareis Community Campus
- Dark Ombre by Tom Currie, installed 1979, Deschutes County Commissioners Office
- Dreamweaver by Eric Holt, installed 2014, Healing Garden at St. Charles Cancer Center
- Earth Song by Bruce West, installed 2005, NorthWest Crossing Drive and Shevlin Park Road Roundabout
- Evening Sounds by Ruth Rodman, installed 1977, Central Oregon Community College Grandview Student Center
- Evolution by Troy Pillow, installed 2008, Bear Creek Road and 8th Street Roundabout
- Fabric Banners by Anita Curl, installed 1996, Mt. View High School
- Flowing by Al Goldsby, installed 1989, Bend Park and Recreation Administration Building
- Flowing by Maya Radoczy, installed 1998, Deschutes Public Library
- Grizzly by Sherry Sander, installed 2001, 9th Street and Franklin Avenue Roundabout
- High Desert Spiral by John Fleming, installed 2013, Mt. Washington Drive and Simpson Roundabout
- Kickoff by Gloria Bornstein, installed 2012, Pine Nursery Park Roundabout
- Landscape Elements by Betty Feves, installed 1983, Pinckney Center at Central Oregon Community College
- Lodestar by Roger Berry, installed 2009, Bond Street and Reed Market Roundabout
- Mentant Passage by Walter Crump, installed 1977, Central Oregon Community College Grandview Student Center
- Might of the Work Force by Devin Field, installed 2005, Butler Market Road and 8th Street Roundabout
- Migration by Hai Ying Wu, installed 2004, Corner of College Way and Newport Avenue
- Milky Way by Devin Laurence Field, installed 2013, Mt. Washington Drive and Shevlin Park Road Roundabout
- Mt. Bachelor Compass by Steve Jensen, installed 2002, Century Drive and Mt. Washington Drive Roundabout
- Orb I by Brandon Zebold, installed 2005, Mt. Washington Drive and Skyliners Road Roundabout
- Otter by Ann Bannard, installed 1980, Riverbend Park
- Otter Knot by Wayne Chabre, installed 2001, Deschutes Public Library
- Phoenix Rising by Frank Boyden, installed 2002, Century Drive and Galveston Road Roundabout
- Pronghorns by Tom Hardy, installed 1981, High Desert Museum
- Redsides by Miles Pepper, installed 2001, Colorado and Simpson Avenue Roundabout
- Riparian Botanicals by Troy Corless, installed 2011, East Bend Library
- River Geese by Peter Helze, installed 2000, McKay Park
- Salmon Dance by Wayne Chabre, installed 2001, Deschutes Public Library
- Smith Rocks by Al Goldsby, installed 1978, Lava Lands Visitor Center
- Sound Garden by Lee Kelly, installed 2010, Reed Market and Mount Bachelor Drive Roundabout
- Spirit Singers by William Van Buskirk, installed 1996, Ronald McDonald House
- Sunrise Spirit Column by David Govedare, installed 2001, NorthWest Crossing Drive and Mt. Washington Drive Roundabout
- Untitled by Tom Hardy, U.S. National Bank of Oregon, Bend Branch
- Untitled by Mara Smith and Kris King, installed 1990, Bend City Hall
- The Viking by Melvin Schuler, installed 1979, Deschutes County Courthouse
- Watercolor Prints by Mike Smith, installed 1999, Kemple Children's Clinic
- Yakaya by Troy Pillow, installed 2010, Riverbend Community Park Roundabout
