= Glass Casa =

- Directed by: Laa Marcus
- Written by: Laa Marcus
- Produced by: Laa Marcus
- Starring: Lizet Benrey; Harley Bronwyn; Nicole Clifford; Geri Courtney-Austein; Anthony De La Cruz
- Cinematography: Ryan Broomberg
- Edited by: Rich Varville
- Music by: Catherine Joy
- Production company: Blood Brothers Effects
- Distributed by: Glass House Distribution
- Release dates: February 24, 2024 (Boomtown Film and Music Festival); December 17, 2024 (VOD)

Glass Casa is a 2024 dark comedy film written, directed and produced by Laa Marcus. It stars Lizet Benrey, Harley Bronwyn, Nicole Clifford, Geri Courtney-Austein, and Anthony De La Cruz.

== Premise ==
A bachelorette party goes wrong after they find the body of an unexpected guest.

== Cast ==
- Lizet Benrey as Maria
- Harley Bronwyn as Jamie
- Nicole Clifford as Bianca
- Geri Courtney-Austein as Evie
- Anthony De La Cruz as Hector
- Braden Garner as Jamie's Film Crew
- Xyla Glass as Young Girl
- Clifford Horn as Jamie's Film Crew
- Jon Huybrecht as Pete
- Alison Iles as Drew
- Travis Laughlin as Alex
- Julie Marcus as Evie's Mom
- Laa Marcus as Jamie's Film Crew
- Alasdair Martin as Jamie's Film Crew
- James Raub as Jamie's Film Crew
- Justin Michael Terry as Charlie

== Production ==
Principal photography was filmed at a mansion in Oceanside, California.

== Release ==
The film premiered February 24, 2024 at Boomtown Film and Music Festival and released on video on demand on December 17th.

== Reception ==
=== Critical response ===
Film critic Michael Knox-Smith gave it 4.5 out of 5, and said it "loses a half star due to not everyone convincing in their roles and because of what appeared to be a couple of plot holes." Voices From The Balcony scored it 4 out of 5 saying it is "quirky and well acted" like Hemet, or the Landlady Don't Drink Tea, but "it may lose some of its charm in the final act as the plot becomes more serious and predictable."

Donald Harrison at San Diego Jewish World complemented the cinematography and said it has "the shock of finding an oddball drifter hanging out in the house and then a dead body, along with absurd drug-induced dark humor." Film Fugitives complemented the cast, calling it "a really enjoyable whodunit, especially if you are watching it during the wedding season." Film Focus Online said with a "strong pace, great acting, and an engaging story, it’s a must-see for murder mystery fans."

Movie Reviews 101 scored it 2 out of 5, saying it "fails to deliver a strong enough mystery." Roger Moore at Movie Nation scored it 1 out of 4, calling it "lifeless and witless."

=== Accolades ===
The film won 1st place for Narrative Feature at Boomtown Film and Music Festival.
