= Gypsy Scourge =

Romani people have historically been criticized and persecuted in Western countries. This article describes a particular instance of this phenomenon in early twentieth century Austria and its historical significance in Nazi Germany.

== Parliamentary motion of June 1908 ==
In June 1908 the pan-German press in Vienna publicized the "dangers" of the "Gypsy scourge," (German: Zigeunerplage) largely as the result of a motion introduced into the Cisleithanian parliament (the Reichsrat in Vienna) by the Pan-German deputy Karl Iro on 5 June 1908.

Iro claimed that Roma were one of the worst scourges for farmers and that "Gypsy broads" who were under indictment in Hungary had confessed that "they made their living only by stealing." Roma people in general, Iro stated, were responsible for "many of the most horrible murders and robbery" in the Austrian-Hungarian Empire.

Iro introduced a rather sophisticated method for contending with the "Gypsy scourge". The principal problem was identification of Roma people.

Knowing their names is of tremendous value for the administration of justice, since upon his arrest, each Gypsy invariably pretends to have only one prior conviction at most. It is impossible to prove to the contrary, precisely because his correct name is not known. ... [To remedy this] each Gypsy should be marked in a manner that will make it possible to recognize him at any time. For example, a number could be tattooed on his right forearm, plus the name the Gypsy has given himself ... the numbers could be transmitted to the district courts, similarly to those of automobiles being transmitted.

The identification method would be supplemented by forced resettlement of the Roma people. The settlements would be supervised and "controlled by a constabulary patrol ... [similar to methods] in penitentiaries and correction facilities ... [and] treated as if they were put under police surveillance."

In addition, Roma families would be broken up and young children would be "re-educated" to serve more "useful" social purposes.

Children should be taken away [from those] ... who don't comply ... for example, between their fifth and sixth year. They could be sent to schools where they would have to be instructed in various crafts according to their disposition, not to be released until they were journeymen. These institutions would be some sort of correctional facilities.... If their native homeland is unknown, strong young Gypsies aimlessly wandering about should also be sent to forced labor institutions.

These measures would be expensive but to subsidize the costs, they wanted Roma property to be confiscated. Iro summarized by stating that

To be sure, these are drastic measures, in particular taking away their children... [however] more moderate measures appear to be entirely futile.

The legislative motion was introduced by the three Pan-German delegates in the Parliament and was seconded by another fifteen delegates, including some Czechs, a Ruthenian and a Pole—nationalities which usually were deadly enemies of the Pan-Germans. The motion was rejected by the Parliament.

== Historical significance ==
In June 1908 Adolf Hitler lived in Vienna and frequently attended sessions of Parliament. In any case he was a voracious reader of the pan-German press and would have been familiar with the topic through that medium. Hamman states unequivocally that "it is certain that in June 1908 Hitler occupied himself with this subject."

== See also ==
- Romani Holocaust
- Anti-Romani sentiment
- Romani studies
- Traveller (disambiguation) - for other groups, such as Irish Travellers, who are also sometimes referred to as "Gypsies"
