= English Travellers =

The term English Travellers may refer to the following itinerant groups indigenous to England:

- British showmen, commonly referred to as Funfair Travellers
- New Age Travellers

The Romanichal, a Romani subgroup also known as English Gypsies, are not formally regarded as Travellers. Although they traditionally lived an itinerant lifestyle, the term English Travellers formally refers to itinerant groups of indigenous origin.

== See also ==
- Welsh Kale
- Scottish Romani and Itinerant people groups
- Irish Travellers
- Traveler (disambiguation)
