= Riverbend Park =

Riverbend Park may refer to:

- Riverbend Park (Bend, Oregon), a park in Bend, Oregon, United States
- Riverbend Park (Florida), a park in Jupiter, Palm Beach County, Florida, US
- Charles River Reservation, a series of parks in Cambridge, Massachusetts, US
