= Numerica Skate Ribbon =

Venue within Riverfront Park in Spokane, Washington

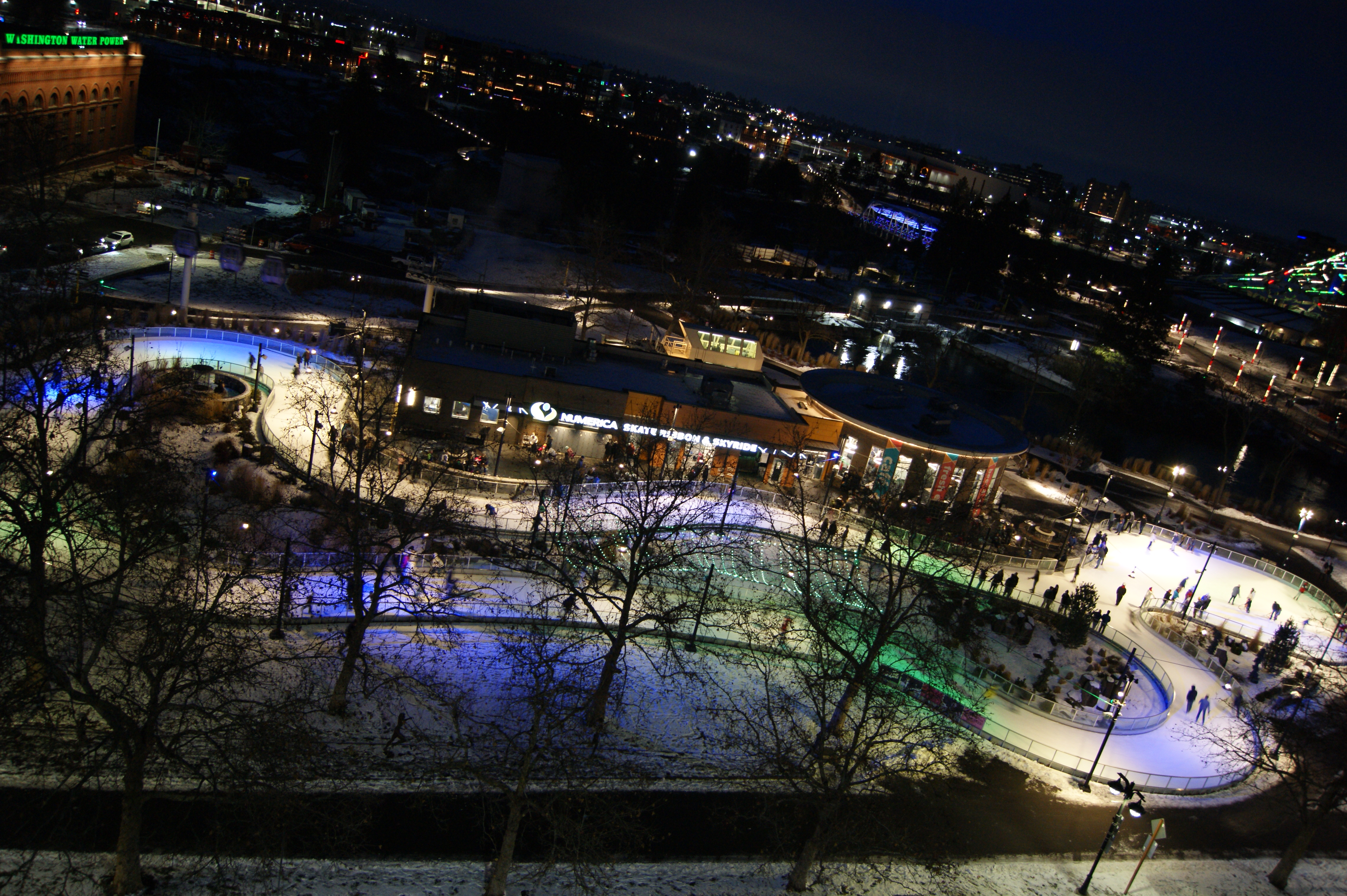
- Owner: Spokane Parks & Recreation

Construction
- Opened: December 8, 2017
- Cost: $10 million
- Architect: Stantec

Tenants
- Numerica Skate Ribbon; Sky Ribbon Café

The Numerica Skate Ribbon is a multi-purpose venue and attraction located in Riverfront Park in Downtown Spokane, Washington. It primarily serves as a year-round outdoor venue for skating, supporting hard surface skating activities such as roller skating, scootering, and skateboarding in the warm months, and converting over for ice skating during the winter months. The ribbon also hosts other events and programmed activities, such as art walks, throughout the year.

The skate ribbon, which first opened in 2017, is located at the southwest corner of Riverfront Park at the intersection of Spokane Falls Boulevard and Post Street, directly across from the Spokane City Hall and River Park Square.

== History ==
On January 22, 2018, just weeks after the Skate Ribbon opened, it was reported that a local woman who had suffered a head injury while ice skating on the ribbon the prior Friday afternoon had died of her injuries.

== Design ==
As the first ribbon-shaped ice rink to be constructed in the Pacific Northwest, the Numerica Skate Ribbon stretches 700 feet long and is completed by a trio of fire pits, allowing for a warming experience for the skaters after being out on the ice. The ribbon is able to hold 300 skaters at any time, and the path is lined with lighting fixtures to keep the experience bright and safe. The path winds underneath trees and by David Govedare’s Bloomsday statues, where it leads to a round “pond” area where skaters can congregate. Just as with the Ice Palace it replaced, the developers put thought into designing this attraction for year-round use, however, it has a slightly different twist. Rather than housing miniature golf, a Ferris wheel, and a petting zoo, the skate ribbon transforms into a place for roller-skating, scootering, or amusement rides. Riley Witt, the lead of Stantec’s office in Spokane and the project manager for the design and construction of the ribbon, explained that the ribbon shape and green space were designed to avoid a large concrete area within the park, and to be seen as a mirroring element of the natural falls. Due to this extra consideration to match the construction to the landscape and overcoming the challenges that come with designing a park that was once a rail yard, the project was also recognized by the Engineering News-Record as the Northwest Best Sports and Entertainment project of 2018.

== Developers ==
Stantec, an international professional services company in the design and consulting industry centered in Edmonton, Canada, agreed to take on this section of the Riverfront Park design. They were originally contracted to design the ice ribbon and building, but the Park Board later asked that the firm be in charge of designing the entire corner of the park where the ribbon would be located. By taking on more than just the rink, Stantec was allowed to go over budget, as the Parks and Recreation division addressed it as a negotiation of sorts.

== Challenges ==
The original planned opening date of the new addition was scheduled for the summer of 2017, but it was later delayed until December 2017 after encountering a number of unforeseen setbacks, such as larger expenses to repair bridges and soil for the rest of the upcoming projects in the area. This added up to a total of an extra $35,000, which would be covered by a $64.3 million taxpayer-approved bond. The original plans also came with a higher price tag than what was originally allotted, as the drawings were planned to cost $400,000 more than the $6.5 billion budgeted for the construction of not only the ribbon itself, but also the skate rental and concession area. Although the construction amounted to more than the budget, Chris Wright, the president of the Spokane Park Board, did not require the construction firm to redesign the ribbon. Contractors Northwest Inc. built the ribbon, with construction costs totaling $7.5 million, according to contract amendments agreed to by Spokane Park Board.
