= Grandfather Cuts Loose the Ponies =

Public sculpture in Washington

Coordinates: 46.9663°N 119.9615°W

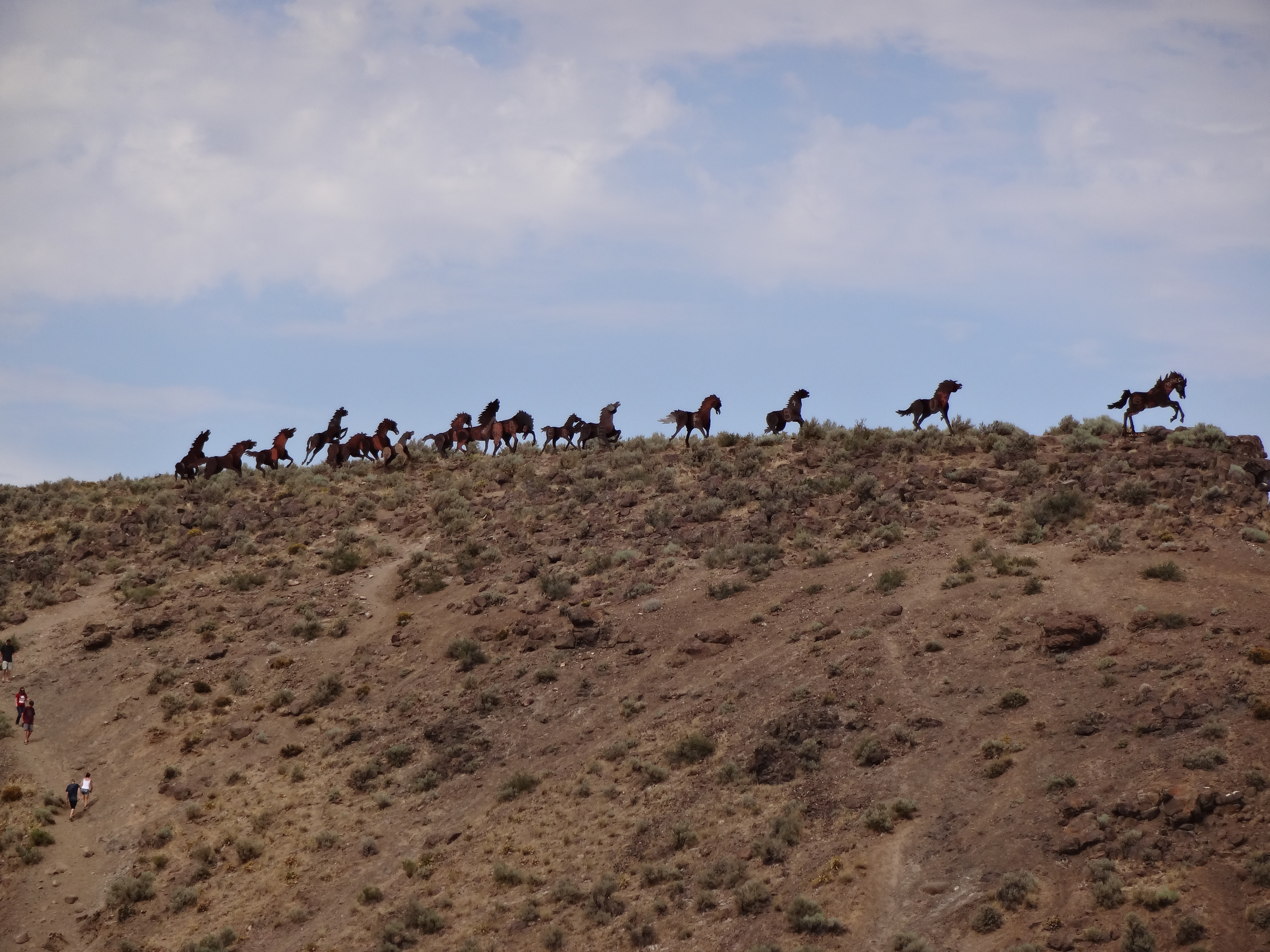
The Horses photographed in 2012

The Horses (also known as the Wild Horse Monument) is a public art sculpture created by David Govedare in 1989–1990 and situated near Vantage, Washington. It consists of 15 life-size steel horses which appear to be galloping across a ridge above the Columbia River. Presented as a gift for the centenary of Washington's statehood, the sculpture was conceived as a memorial to the wild horses which once roamed the region. According to the Seattle Times, it is one of the most-seen public artworks in Washington state.

== Design ==
The original design was for a 36-foot-high tipped basket with two horses still inside and 16 more galloping away from it, a gift from the Grandfather Spirit. In Govedare's imagined tale, the Grandfather Spirit says as he tips the basket:

Creatures of this planet, behold, a Great Basket! I send this basket, bearing the gift of life, to all corners of the universe. Now, take these ponies; I am cutting them loose. They will inspire a spirit of free will. They will be a companion for work and play on this planet.

The basket was to be decorated by local artists with designs of people, leaping salmon, and running deer, "a sort of futuristic Noah's Ark", as Govedare said in 1988. However, funds ran out and the basket has yet to be erected. The 15 life-size horses which comprise the sculpture (as of 2014) are made from half-inch-thick panels of COR-TEN steel, a special iron alloy that rusts on the surface but still retains its structural integrity. The horses, now colored a rich red from oxidation and each weighing approximately 1000 pounds, are welded to four-foot-long metal poles set into the ridge on which the sculpture stands.

== History ==
Govedare had previously created several public art sculptures in Washington, most notably The Joy of Running Together, 40 life-size steel runners installed in Spokane's Riverfront Park to honor the annual Bloomsday Run. He conceived the idea for the wild horse project in 1986. The sculpture would celebrate Washington's 100 years of statehood with a monument both to the native peoples of the state and to the wild horses which once roamed there. A ridge above the Columbia River near Vantage Bridge was proposed as the site because the last great roundup of Washington's wild horses took place in the area in 1906. Govedare's proposal was given official support by the Centennial Committee of Grant County in March 1987 followed by support from the centennial committees of the surrounding counties—Spokane, Adams, Lincoln, and Kittitas. In November 1987 members of the Washington Centennial Commission also wrote a letter in support of the project. The state's Department of Transport ceded the land on the ridge to Grant County which had pledged to maintain the sculpture and the Thundering Hooves Centennial Sculpture Committee was set up to raise the $250,000 in private funds needed to construct and install the sculpture.

The original plan was to install the horses in the spring of 1989 during the state's centennial celebrations. However, fundraising was slow with many potential corporate donors reluctant to support a sculpture that would not be situated in their own community. Only the lead stallion had been completed by August 1989 and was unveiled in Riverfront Park as part of the fundraising drive. The first six horses were finally installed on the ridge in October 1990 with 9 more in the ensuing months. The sculpture has remained unfinished since then for lack of funds. The 13-ton steel basket from which the horses were to emerge was never constructed. By 2008 the cost of constructing and installing it was estimated at $350,000. Over the years Grandfather Cuts Loose the Ponies has become one of the most-seen public art installations in the state according to the Seattle Times, with 100 million vehicles having driven past it between 1990 and 2008 alone.

== Access ==
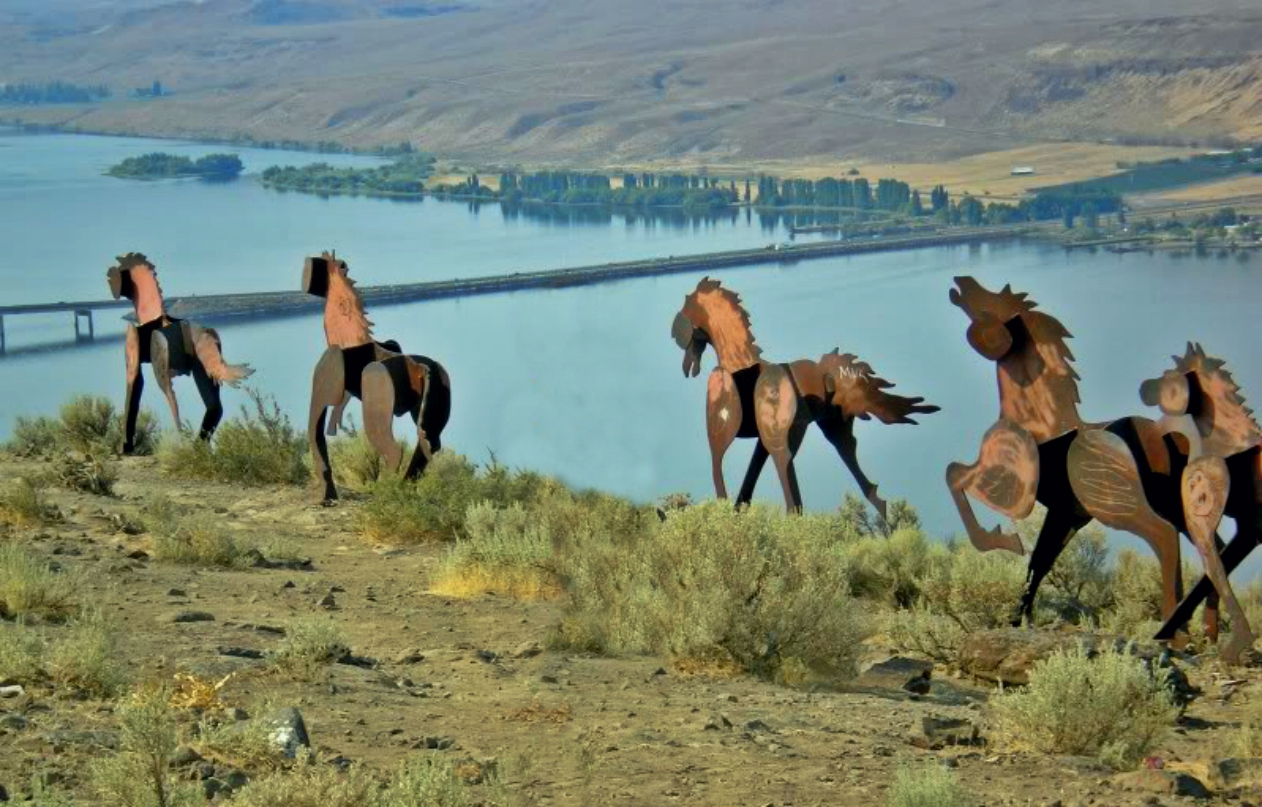

Visible for miles in all directions, the sculpture can be accessed via a rough footpath which leads from the east-bound side of Interstate 90 near Vantage to the top of the ridge. According to the guide book Washington Curiosities, the best viewing point from a distance is Wanapum Vista on I-90 three miles east of Vantage.

== See also ==
- Bleu Horses, a work by Jim Dolan in Montana also featuring steel horse sculptures
