= Sam Chegini =

Iranian filmmaker and animator (born 1992)

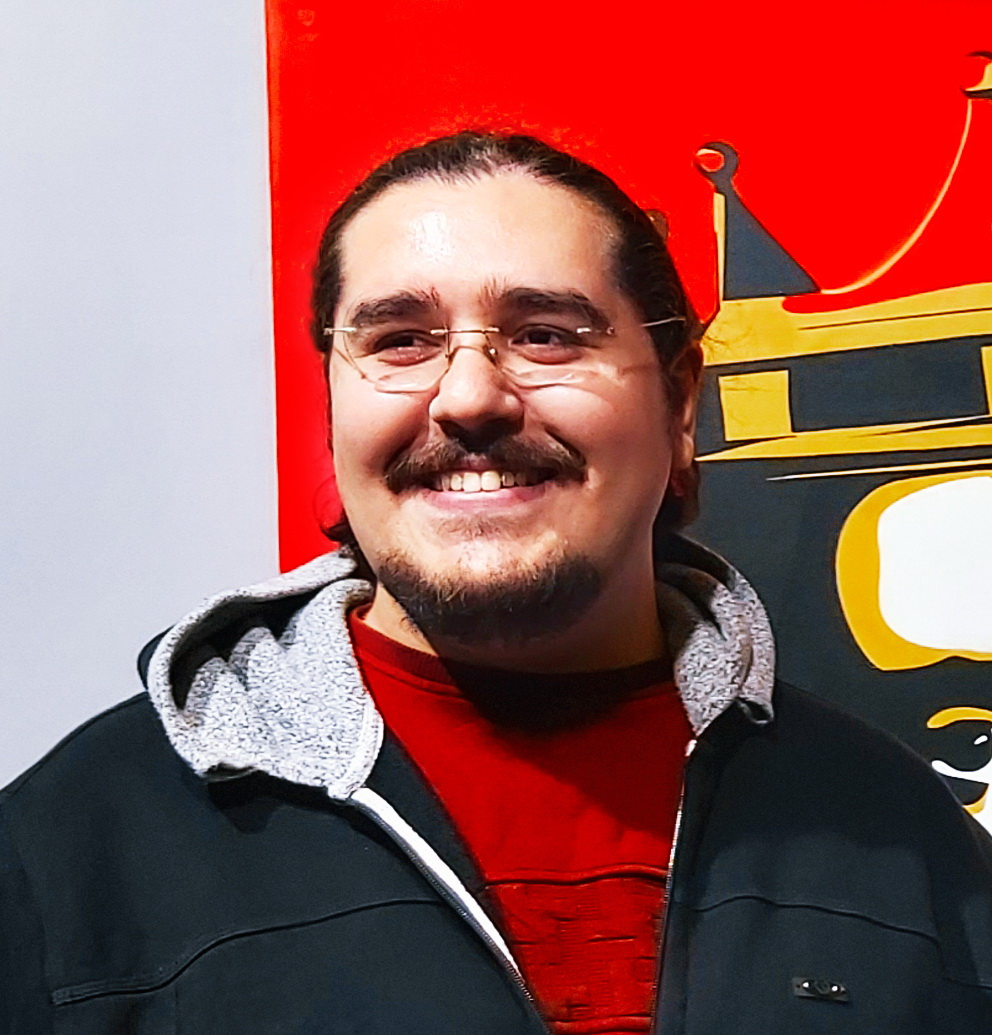
- Chegini in 2019
- Born: Sam Chegini; 27 January 1992 (age 34); Tehran, Iran
- Known for: Illustration, Music video, Video art, Graphic design, Puppetry
- Notable work: Aqualung (2021), The Cops Don't Know (2015); Traveller (2012)
- Awards: Royal Reel Award for Traveller (2013), 2nd place Boomtown Film & Music Festival for Traveller (2013), Persbook Art Award for the Lyre of Mesopotamia
- Website: www.samchegini.com

Sam Chegini (Persian: سام چگینی, born 27 January 1992) is an Iranian filmmaker, music video director, animator, graphic designer, video editor, cartoonist, artist and puppeteer.

Born in Tehran in 1992, he has directed videos for Chris de Burgh, Jakko Jakszyk, Jethro Tull, Gentle Giant, and Lenny Henry.

== Career ==
Chegini began his career as a puppeteer at a local TV station at the age of 14. In 2009, he joined VOP (Voice of Peace), a group that worked on reconstructing ancient Persian musical instruments, sponsored by the UN-Habitat and IAARA. He produced the film The Lyre of Mesopotamia, which received an award for best video art at the 1st Persbookart Contest on Facebook in 2010, judged by Edward Lucie-Smith.

In 2011, he created the video Traveller for Dutch singer/songwriter Linde Nijland. Traveller has been an official selection of various film festivals and has been screened in several countries. In 2013, Chegini won the Royal Reel Award from the Canada International Film Festival for the music video, which was also voted #1 in the Frisian charts on the Klipkar+TV program.

In 2016, Chegini made an animated music video for British comedian Sir Lenny Henry, titled "The Cops Don't Know" produced by British record producer Chris Porter, which premiered on Classic Rock Magazine. Henry commended the video in an interview with Classic Rock Magazine, noting its "labor of love" style and calling Sam "gifted".

In 2017, Chegeni joined Verbatim Theater Group as a video artist, projection mapper and international affairs expert for the play MANUS, which was directed by Nazanin Sahamizadeh. He participated in 3 international festivals with the team, including the 36th Fajr International Theater Festival (Tehran), 2 performances in Bangladesh, (Chittagong and Dhaka) and the 10th International Theatre Festival of Kerala (Thrissur, Kerala, India).

As artistic director, Chegini organized the 9th Wordless International Short Film Festival in the city of Qazvin, Iran, which was screened concurrently in Sydney, Australia, in November 2017.

In August 2018, "SamChats," an online talk show interviewing international artists for a Persian-speaking audience, premiered on YouTube. Hosted by Sam Chegini, the first season featured Neil Taylor, Lena Katina, Ayda Mosharaf, and Alex Jolig.

In 2020, during the COVID-19 pandemic, Chegini directed a music video for King Crimson's frontman, Jakko Jakszyk, titled "The Trouble with Angels". Jakszyk praised Chegini's work, commenting, "The first single, The Trouble With Angels, makes its debut on the 14 August 2020, complete with an extraordinary, animated video by Iranian filmmaker Sam Chegini. And getting that made amidst the pandemic is a whole other story!" In an exclusive interview with Prog magazine, Jakko recounted the unusual production process of the video due to the COVID-19 pandemic and a challenging political climate in Iran, leading Prog Magazine to headline: "Worldwide political upheaval almost derails the shoot for King Crimson singer Jakko Jakszyk's recent promo video".

"The video looks amazing, but what's most amazing is that we managed to make it at all," said Jakko Jakszyk, explaining the difficult online production of the animated video. In another interview with Prog, British journalist/TV presenter Matthew Wright described the video as: "I haven't seen anything quite like it! It is not just visually stunning. The story behind the video is worth telling." In the same interview, Jakszyk mentioned their initial collaboration on the video for Lenny Henry's "The Cops Don't Know," which resulted in their subsequent collaborations, "The Trouble with Angels" and "Uncertain Times".

Later in 2020, Chegini directed another animated music video, "Uncertain Times", for Jakko Jakszyk, starring British actor and comedian, Al Murray.

In 2021, an official music video for "Aqualung" was released by Warner Music to commemorate the album's 50th Anniversary. The Aqualung video, directed by Sam Chegini, premiered on Rolling Stone on 1 April 2021. Jethro Tull frontman Ian Anderson praised Chegini in a statement to Rolling Stone.

On 21 April 2021, for World Creativity and Innovation Day, the virtual event "Creativity For Urban Future" was hosted by the UN-Habitat and Urban+Future. Alongside the screening of the video "Aqualung" at the virtual event, Chegini gave a speech about "Limitations that can lead to Creativity and Innovation" based on his experiences making videos.

On 30 April, Gentle Giant announced the release date of a remixed version of their 1975 album "Free Hand" by Steven Wilson with custom visuals for all tracks. The video for the title track "Free Hand" was directed and animated by Chegini, and released 25 June 2021.

On 15 October 2021, British-Irish singer/songwriter, Chris de Burgh released a music video for his single "Legacy" directed by Chegini. The animated music video was produced for his album "The Legend of Robin Hood".

On 28 January 2022, Jethro Tull's new album, "The Zealot Gene", was released, with two music videos directed by Chegini: "Sad City Sisters" and "The Zealot Gene".

In 2024, Chegini directed and animated 3 music videos for British composer and keyboardist, Benjamin Croft's album "We Are Here to Help" including the title track feat. Jeff Scott Soto, "Wrestling with Plato" feat. Lynsey Ward and "Lower Moat Manner". Later that year, he directed and animated 3 videos for British singer/songwriter, Marsha Swanson's album "Near Life Experience" for the tracks "No Mystery", "Still Remember" and "In Touch"

Chegini is also a member of the United Nations Alliance of Civilizations Intercultural Leaders.

== Filmography ==
Year	English title	Persian title	Transliteration
2006-2007	Words Like A Dream	کلماتی همچو رویا	Kalamati hamcho Roya
2009	The Lyre of Mesopotamia	بربط بین النهرین	Barbat-e-Beynolnahreyn
2011	A Spaceman Came Travelling	مرد بیگانه سفر می کند	Marde Biganeh Safar Mikonad
2012	Linde Nijland - Traveller	مسافر	Mosafer
2016	Sir Lenny Henry - The Cops Don't Know	پلیس ها نمی دانند	Police ha Nemeedaanand
2018	SamChats Series	مجموعه گپی با سام	SamChats
2020	Jakko M Jakszyk: The Trouble with Angels	عذاب فرشتگان	Azab-e-Fereshtegaan
2020	Jakko M Jakszyk: Uncertain Times	روزگار بی‌ثبات	Roozgar-e-beesobaat
2021	Jethro Tull: Aqualung	آکوالانگ	Aqualung
2021	Gentle Giant: Free Hand	دست آزاد	Dast-e-Azaad
2021	Chris de Burgh: Legacy	میراث	Meeraas
2022	Jethro Tull: Sad City Sisters	خواهران شهر محزون	Khaharan-e-Shahr-e-Mahzoon
2022	Jethro Tull: The Zealot Gene	ژن تعصب	Zhen-e-Ta'asob
2024	Benjamin Croft: Wrestling with Plato	کشتی با افلاطون	Koshti ba Aflatoon
2024	Benjamin Croft: Lower Moat Manner	عمارت خندق سفلی	Emarat-e-Khandaq-e-Sofla
2024	Benjamin Croft: We Are Here to Help	برای کمک آمده ایم	Baraye Komak Amadeyim
2024	Marsha Swanson: No Mystery	بی رمز و راز	Bi Ramz-o-Raz
2024	Marsha Swanson: Still Remember	همچنان در خاطرم	Hamchenan dar Khateram
2024	Marsha Swanson: In Touch	-	-

== Puppetry ==
Year	English title	Original title	Transliteration
2022	Jethro Tull: Sad City Sisters	خواهران شهر محزون	Khaharan-e-Shahr-e-Mahzoon
2014	The City of Mice 2	شهر موش ها 2	Shahr-e-Moosh ha 2
2012	Iran Student Puppetry Festival	جشنواره دانشجویی تئاتر عروسکی	Jashnvare Theatr-e-Arousaki
2011	Moon Kids theatre	نمایش بچه های ماه	Bachehay-e-Maah
2011	Sunflower TV series (8th Series)	مجموعه تلویزیونی آفتابگردان 8	Aaftaabgardan
2009	Sunflower TV series (5th Series)	مجموعه تلویزیونی آفتابگردان 5	Aaftaabgardan
2009	Goldooneha TV Series (2nd Series)	مجموعه تلویزیونی گلدونه ها 2	Goldooneha
2008	Sunflower TV Series (4th Series)	مجموعه تلویزیونی آفتابگردان 4	Aftabgardan
2008	Goldooneha TV Series (1st Series)	مجموعه تلویزیونی گلدونه ها 1	Goldooneha
2007	Sunflower TV Series(2nd Series)	مجموعه تلویزیونی آفتابگردان 2	Aftabgardan
2007	Sunflower TV Series(2nd Series)	مجموعه تلویزیونی آفتابگردان 2	Aftabgardan

== Awards ==
- Best Music Video - Tassvir Film Festival, for Chris de Burgh's Legacy
- Best Music Video - Cannes World Film Festival, for The Trouble with Angels (2021)
- Honorable Mention - 39th New Jersey International Film Festival, for The Trouble with Angels (2021)
- Best Music Video Award, ShortPole London, for The Cops Don't Know (2016)
- Music Video of the Month, The Monthly Film Festival, for The Cops Don't Know (2016)
- Best Music Video, The Motion Picture Film Festival, USA for Emotions of Tomorrow (2016)
- Best short of the week, Reel13 WNET, PBS for Traveller music video (2014)
- The Royal Reel Award for Traveller music video – Canada International Film Festival (2013)
- 1st place – Music Video Category for Traveller – 9th Annual MY HERO International Film Festival 2013
- 2nd place – Experimental/Music Video category for Traveller – The 6th Annual Boomtown Film and Music Festival, Texas (2013)
