= The Cat (sculpture) =

- Artist: Olaf Breuning
- Year: 2020
- Medium: Concrete sculpture with steel, aluminum tools
- Subject: Cat
- Dimensions: 300 cm × 250 cm × 800 cm (9.8 ft × 8.2 ft × 26 ft)
- Weight: 10,250 kilograms (11.30 short tons)
- Location: Christine E. Lynn Rehabilitation Center, Miami, Florida
- 25.79188°N 80.21419°W

The Cat is a concrete public art sculpture by Swiss artist Olaf Breuning. The sculpture is located in the Healing Garden at the Christine E. Lynn Rehabilitation Center in Miami, Florida. The sculpture was created as part of Miami's Art in Public Places program which requires 1.5% of new construction funds go to public art installations. The Cat was created for a cost of $400,000.

The three part sculpture weighs several tons and was manufactured in Switzerland. The cat's face is based on paintings by artist Paul Klee who was a big influence on Breuning. The sculpture has interactive features that help patients recovering from neurological disorders recover.
