= Bleu Horses =

Horse sculptures

- Part of the Bleu Horses herd
- Artist: Jim Dolan
- Completion date: 13 September 2013
- Type: Sculpture
- Medium: Steel
- Subject: Horses
- Location: Three Forks, Montana; 45°59′04″N 111°35′35″W
- Website: www.bleuhorses.com

The Bleu Horses is a set of 39 horse sculptures made primarily of steel and permanently installed on a hillside off Highway 287 just north of Three Forks, Montana. The name of the installation is taken from a color of horse known as a blue roan, though the live animal color is closer to gray. The horse sculptures were created and set up by artist Jim Dolan of Belgrade, Montana, who previously had created other complex outdoor sculptures over the last 30 years, including a herd of elk placed upon the lawn of a bank in Bozeman, and a fly fisherman sculpture in Ennis. He also donated four of his sculptures at Montana State University (MSU), and installed a flock of geese in the terminal of Bozeman Yellowstone International Airport.

== Background ==
Dolan spent 15 months and his own money to create, transport and install the horses as a gift to the people of Montana. When he moved to Montana from California in 1966, he intended to live there permanently and be an asset to the state: "I always knew that someday I’d have a specific project ... I decided [in 2013], on my 64th birthday, this is what I would do". The horse sculptures were installed on Kamp Hill on land owned by Dean Folkvord of Wheat Montana on 160 unfenced acres (65 ha) acre that is not suitable for farming. Folkvord came up with the idea of using Kamp Hill when Dolan stopped into the Wheat Montana Bakery for coffee and expressed frustration to Folkvord about his difficulties finding an appropriate site for installing the horses he was creating. The site is along U.S. 287 just north of mile marker 104. There is a pull-off and a thin trail leading up the hill to the herd.

== Development and installation ==
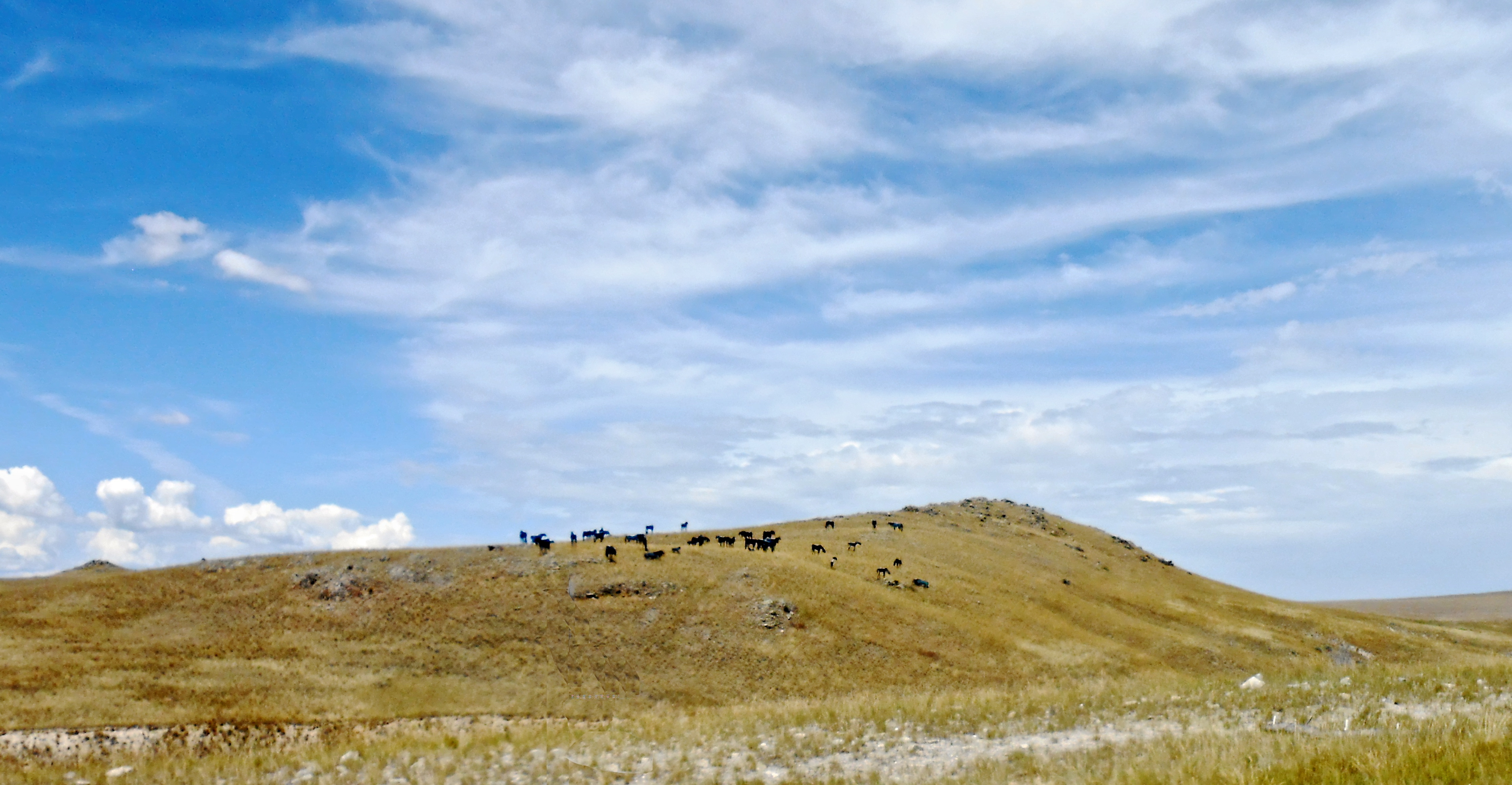
Bleu horses installation as seen from Highway 287

The sculptures are realistic enough to appear live from a distance, but are intended to be somewhat "impressionistic." To emphasize the elegance of the horse, the legs of the horse sculptures are one-third longer than those of real horses, and they average 8 feet (2.4 m) high at the withers. Dolan said, "They're symbols of horses and what horses mean to Montanans. But at first sight, I want people to believe they are real horses, just for a second." They are posed in a variety of realistic positions from foals suckling mother's milk, to alert steeds, to supine equines. According to Dolan, "I tried to place the horses the way I see the horses living in their natural environment according to their nature."

Twelve of the horses have their heads placed on ball bearings and rigged with gears and pulley systems so their necks or torsos move in the wind. Each horse is painted blue with accents of black and white to give their forms a sense of depth. They have manes and tails made of polyester rope that has been unraveled and attached so it moves realistically in the wind. The 4,000 feet (1,200 m) of rope needed for the horses was unraveled by hand by the employees at Reach, Inc., a supported workplace for people with developmental disabilities. Dolan said, "They really enjoyed doing it, and when I told them what the ropes were for, they felt like they were involved in something bigger than just the job. So those people, they’re part of this, too.” The horses were placed on the land by having long stakes welded to their hooves and placed into holes created with a jackhammer. A tractor was used to place each sculpture in its precise location.

== In popular culture ==
In December 2013, three of the sculptures were stolen. The theft was covered in the news nationwide and in some international news outlets. They were recovered few months later. Dolan reflected in 2023, “it was great publicity”.

== See also ==
- Grandfather Cuts Loose the Ponies
