= Traveler =

A traveler is anyone engaged in travel.

Traveler(s), traveller(s), The Traveler, or The Traveller may also refer to:

== People ==
=== Groups ===
- Various Itinerant groups in Europe, especially Indigenous Norwegian Travellers and Irish Travellers
- Gutter punks, often associated with punk subculture
- New Age travellers

=== Individuals ===
- List of people known as the Traveller

== Arts and entertainment ==
=== Fictional characters ===
- The Traveler (Star Trek)
- The Traveller (James Herbert)
- Travellers, in the novel Earthworks by Brian Aldiss
- Travelers, in D.J. MacHale's Pendragon novel series
- The Traveler, in the video game Destiny
- Traveler (Genshin Impact), the protagonist of 2020 video game Genshin Impact

=== Films ===
- The Traveler (1974 film), an Iranian drama
- Traveller (1981 film), an Irish film starring Davy Spillane
- Traveler (1983 film), a Taiwanese film written by Wu Nien-jen
- Traveller (1997 film), an American crime drama
- Traveller (1999 film), a Brazilian drama
- The Traveller (2009 film), an Egyptian film
- The Traveler (2010 film), an American–Canadian horror film
- Traveller (2012 film), Linde Nijland's official music video
- Travelers: Jigen Keisatsu ("Travelers: Dimension Police") a 2013 Japanese science fiction film
- The Traveller (2024 film), Chinese film directed by Wuershan
- The Travellers (2025 film), Australian comedy directed by Bruce Beresford

=== Games ===
- Traveller (role-playing game), 1977
- Travellers (card game)

=== Literature ===
==== Periodicals ====
- The Traveler (magazine), a Chinese tourism magazine
- The Traveller, another name for the British Journal, an English newspaper published from 1722 to 1728
- The Travelle, a 19th century British evening newspaper; see Walter Coulson
- Boston Evening Traveller, a newspaper published from 1845 to 1967

==== Books, poems, and short stories ====
- Traveler, a 2007 novel by Ron McLarty
- Traveler (novel series), by D. B. Drumm
- Traveller (novel), by Richard Adams, 1988
- The Traveler (novel), a 2005 novel by John Twelve Hawks
- The Traveler, 1 1987 novel by John Katzenbach
- The Traveler, a 1991 novel by Don Coldsmith
- The Traveler: An American Odyssey in the Himalayas, a 1993 book by Eric Hansen
- Travelers (novel), by Helon Habila, 2019
- "The Traveller" (poem), by Oliver Goldsmith, 1764
- The Traveller, a poem by James Dillet Freeman
- "The Traveller", a short story by Richard Matheson

=== Music ===
==== Groups ====
- The Travellers (Canadian band), a Canadian folk singing group
- The Travellers (Maltese band), a band from Gozo, Malta

==== Albums ====
- Traveler (Colin James album), 2003
- Traveler (Hitomi album), 2004
- Traveler (Steve Roach album), 1983
- Traveler (Trey Anastasio album), 2012
- Traveller (Anoushka Shankar album), 2011
- Traveller (Chris Stapleton album), 2015
- Traveller (Christy Moore album), 1999
- Traveller (Jorn album), 2013
- Traveller (Slough Feg album), 2003
- The Traveler (Kenny Barron album), 2007
- The Traveler (Rhett Miller album), 2015
- Traveler (Official Hige Dandism album), 2019
- The Traveler, an album by Billy Cobham, 1994
- The Traveler, an album by Kenny Wayne Shepherd Band, 2019
- The Traveller, an album by Shed, 2010, and his pseudonym
- The Traveller, an album by Tineke Postma, 2009
- Travellers, an album by Nucleus Torn, 2010

==== Songs ====
- "Traveller" (song), 2015
- "Traveller", a song by Aiko Kayō, 2004
- "Traveller", title track of Traveller (Anoushka Shankar album), 2011
- "Traveller", title track of Traveller (Jorn album), 2013
- "The Traveller", a song by Joe Satriani from the 2002 album Strange Beautiful Music
- "The Traveller", a song by A Flock of Seagulls from the 1983 album Listen
- "The Traveller", a song by Chris de Burgh from the 1980 album Eastern Wind
- "The Traveller", a song by Beach House from the 2015 album Thank Your Lucky Stars
- "The Traveller", a song by Ben&Ben from the 2024 album The Traveller Across Dimensions
- "The Traveler", a song by Scale the Summit from the 2013 album The Migration

=== Television ===
- Traveler (American TV series), 2007
- Traveler (South Korean TV series), a 2019
- Travelers (TV series), a 2016 Canadian science fiction drama
- "Travelers" (Stargate Atlantis), a 2007 episode
- "Travelers" (The X-Files), a 1998 episode
- "The Travelers", an episode of Dark
- "The Travellers" a 2001 episode of The Lost World
- "A Traveler", an episode of The Twilight Zone (2019 TV series)

=== Other uses in arts and entertainment ===
- The Traveler (sculpture), 1982, by Richard Beyer, in Bend, Oregon, U.S.
- The Travelers (sculptures), surrealist sculptures by Bruno Catalano
- Traveler curtain, or traveler, a front curtain in theaters

== Horses ==
- Traveller (horse) (1857–1871), owned by General Robert E. Lee
- Traveler (horse) (1880–1912), American Quarter horse foundation sire
- Traveler (mascot), a horse mascot of the University of Southern California

== Science and technology ==
- Costaconvexa centrostrigaria or traveller, a moth
- Traveller (nautical fitting)
- Traveler, part of a ring spinning machine for the manufacture of textile yarn

== Sports ==
- Delhi Travellers, a junior ice hockey team in Canada
- Little Rock Travelers, a defunct American baseball team
  - Arkansas Travelers, an American baseball team
- Travelers Championship, an American professional golf tournament

== Vehicles ==
- HMS Traveller, several Royal Navy ships
- USS Traveller (1805), a US Navy supply boat in commission in 1805
- USS Traveler (SP-122), a US Navy patrol boat in commission from 1917 to 1919
- Traveler (automobile), an American car produced in 1914–1915
- Beechcraft Traveller, a British name for the Beechcraft Model 17 Staggerwing
- Scout Traveler, an electric sport utility vehicle manufactured by Scout Motors
- Jetour Traveller, a Chinese mid-size SUV

== Other uses ==
- Traveler Mountain, in Maine, U.S., whose highest peak is called The Traveler
- The Travelers Companies, an American insurance company

== See also ==
- Migrant (disambiguation)
