= Yakaya =

2010 sculpture by Troy Pillow in Bend, Oregon, U.S.

- Artist: Troy Pillow
- Year: 2010
- Medium: Stainless steel sculpture
- Location: Bend, Oregon, United States
- 44.04307°N 121.32084°W

Yakaya is an outdoor 2010 sculpture by Troy Pillow, installed in Riverbend Park, along Columbia Street, in Bend, Oregon, United States. The painted stainless steel artwork is constructed from nine kayaks and measures 30 feet (9.1 m) x 30 feet (9.1 m) x 30 feet (9.1 m).

== See also ==
- 2010 in art
- List of public art in Bend, Oregon
