= Bend Gate (Kelly) =

1998 sculpture by Lee Kelly in Bend, Oregon, U.S.

- Artist: Lee Kelly
- Year: 1998
- Medium: Steel sculpture
- Location: Bend, Oregon, United States
- 44.068778°N 121.307522°W

Bend Gate is an outdoor 1998 Cor-ten steel sculpture by Lee Kelly, installed in Bend, Oregon, United States. The work was acquired by the nonprofit organization Art in Public Places.

== See also ==
- 1998 in art
- List of works by Lee Kelly
- List of public art in Bend, Oregon
