= The Cops Don't Know =

Single by Lenny Henry

from the album New Millennium Blues
- Language: English
- Released: April 2016
- Label: Made in Soho Music
- Composer: Jakko Jakszyk
- Lyricist: Lenny Henry
- Producer: Chris Porter

"The Cops Don't Know" is the first track and single from the New Millennium Blues album by Lenny Henry. It was released by Made in Soho Music in April 2016. The song was written by Lenny Henry and the music is composed by Jakko Jakszyk. The official music video was produced by Chris Porter and directed by Sam Chegini. "The Cops Don't Know" is about racism and police brutality in the United States. The story tells of a failure of a society to truly address the problem of fear and hate of the other. The main thrust is Black Lives Matter.

== Awards ==
- Plural+ FERA-LUCERO Award – Plural+ Youth Video Festival 2016
- Music Video of the Month – The Monthly Film Festival, Glasgow - 2016
- Best Music Video – ShortPole London - Summer 2016

=== Nominations ===
- Best Music Video – Portobello Film Festival, London 2016
- Best Music Video – The Smalls Film Festival, London 2016
- Best Music Video – Filmquest Film Festival, Utah, USA 2016
- Best Music Video – TMC London Film Festival, London 2016
- Best Music Video – Los Angeles CineFest, LA, USA 2016
- Best Music Video – Direct Short Online Film Festival 2016

The Black Lives Matter Logo
