= Lenny Henry =

British comedian and actor (born 1958)

Sir Lenny Henry CBE
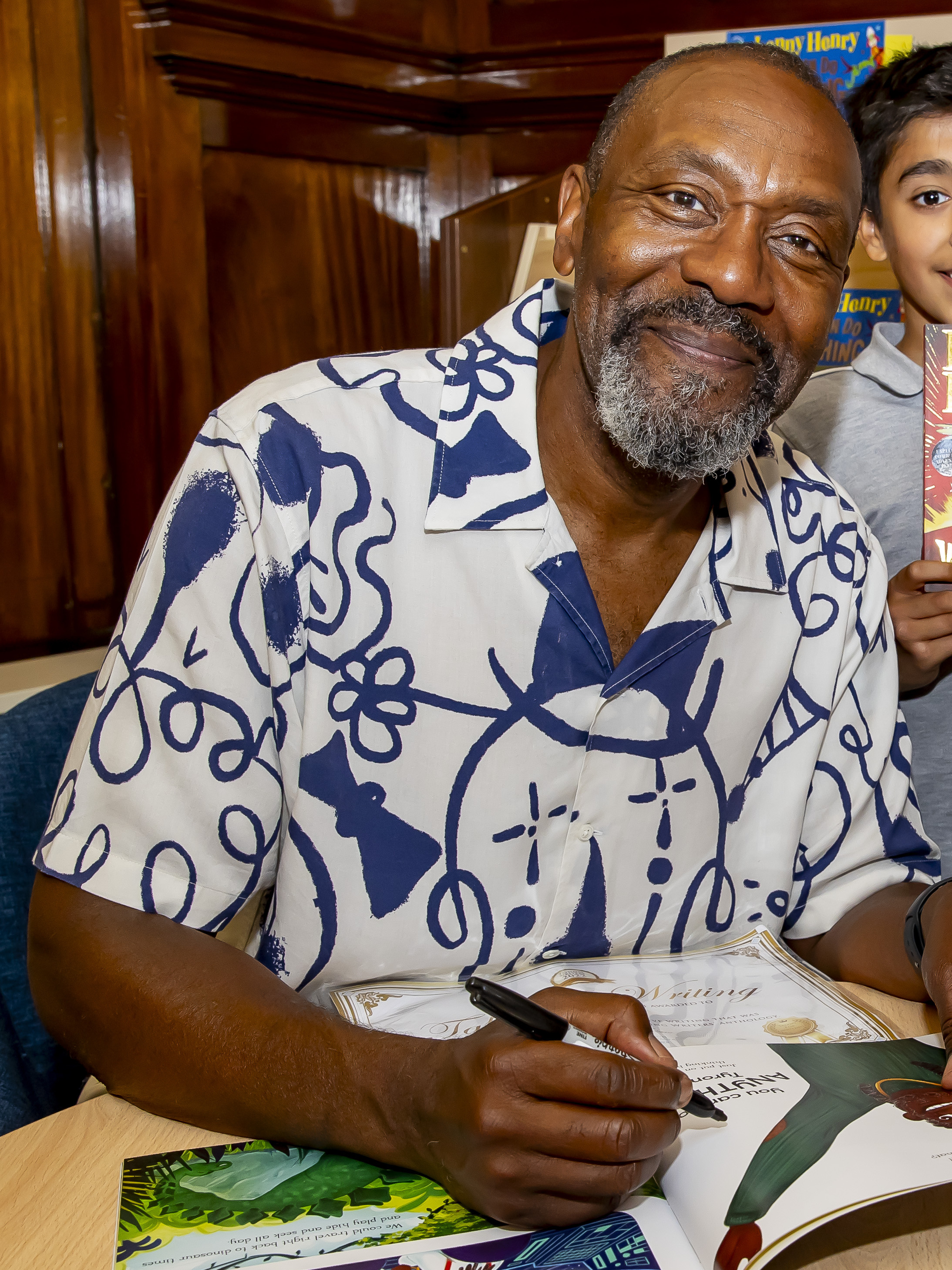
- Henry signing books in 2023
- Born: Lenworth George Henry; 29 August 1958 (age 68); Dudley, Worcestershire, England
- Education: W. R. Tuson College; Open University (BA); Royal Holloway, University of London (MA, PhD)
- Occupations: Comedian; actor; presenter; writer
- Years active: 1975–present
- Known for: Tiswas; The Lenny Henry Show; Chef!; Comic Relief
- Spouse: Dawn French (m. 1984; div. 2010)
- Partner: Lisa Makin (2010–present)
- Children: 1

Sir Lenworth George Henry (born 29 August 1958) is a British comedian, actor, presenter and writer. He gained success as a stand-up comedian and impressionist in the late 1970s and early 1980s, becoming a regular cast member of the children's entertainment show Tiswas and the sketch comedy show Three of a Kind. In 1984, he began The Lenny Henry Show, which ran until 2005 and varied between sketch show and sitcom during its run. He was the most prominent black British comedian of the late 1970s and 1980s, and much of his material served to celebrate and parody his African-Caribbean roots.

In 1985, he co-founded the charity Comic Relief with the comedy screenwriter Richard Curtis. He has appeared in numerous other TV programmes, including starring in the sitcom Chef! and hosting the talent show The Magicians. Since the 2010s, he has transitioned towards more serious acting roles on stage and screen. He appears in the Amazon Prime series The Lord of the Rings: The Rings of Power. In 2006, the British public ranked Henry number 18 in ITV's poll of TV's 50 Greatest Stars.

Henry was the chancellor of Birmingham City University. In February 2024, he announced his planned retirement from the position at the end of the 2023‍–‍24 academic year after eight years in the post.

== Early life ==
Lenworth George Henry was born at Burton Road Hospital in Dudley, on 29 August 1958, and named after the doctor who delivered him to Winston Jervis Henry (1910–1978) and Winifred Louise Henry (1922–1998), who had emigrated to Britain from Jamaica. The fifth of seven children, Henry was the first child of the family to be born in the United Kingdom. When Henry was 10 years old, he began spending time with the man who was later revealed to be his biological father, Albert Augustus "Bertie" Green (1927–2004), another Jamaican immigrant with whom his mother had a brief relationship when she first arrived in England from their native Jamaica.

Henry attended St John's Primary School and later The Blue Coat School in Dudley, before completing his schooling at W. R. Tuson College in Preston, Lancashire.

== Career ==
=== Early career ===
Henry's formative years in comedy were spent in working men's clubs, where he impersonated mainly white characters, such as the Some Mothers Do 'Ave 'Em character Frank Spencer. His earliest television appearance was on the New Faces talent show in 1975, aged 16, which he won with impersonations of Frank Spencer, Stevie Wonder and others.

His first manager was Robert Luff, who signed him in 1975 and gave him the opportunity, between the ages of 16 and 21, to perform as a comedian as part of the Luff-produced touring stage version of The Black and White Minstrel Show. In July 2009, Lenny Henry stated he was contractually obliged to perform and regretted his part in the show, telling The Times in 2015 that his appearance on the show led to a profound "wormhole of depression", and he regretted his family not intervening.

In 1976, Henry appeared with Norman Beaton in LWT's sitcom The Fosters, Britain's first comedy series featuring a predominantly black cast. Henry also made guest appearances on television programmes including Celebrity Squares, Seaside Special and The Ronnie Corbett Show.

=== 1980s ===
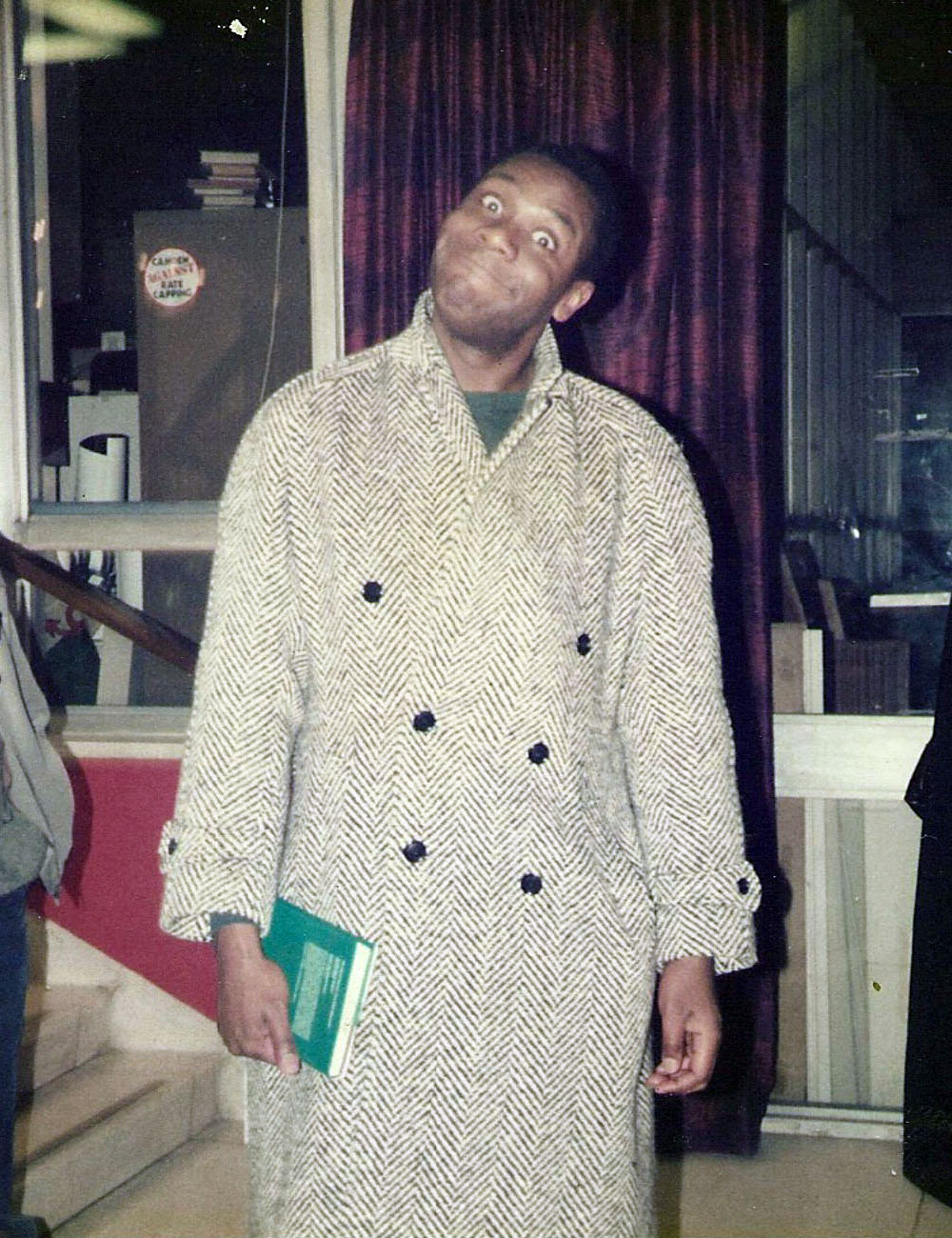
Henry in the 1980s

In 1980, Henry performed in Summer Season in Blackpool with Cannon and Ball. He has since said that "the summer season was the first time [he] felt that [his] act had received a proper response from an audience". Around the same time, he co-hosted the children's programme Tiswas from 1978 until 1981 playing such characters as Rastafarian Algernon Razzmatazz, David Bellamy and Trevor McDoughnut (a parody of Trevor McDonald), and subsequently performed in and wrote for the show Three of a Kind.

Also in 1980, he teamed up with alternative-comedy collective The Comic Strip. During his involvement with the group he met comic actress Dawn French, whom he married in 1984. She encouraged him to move over to the fledgling alternative comedy scene, where he established a career as a stand-up comedy performer and character comedian.

He introduced characters who both mocked and celebrated African Caribbean British culture, such as Brixton pirate radio disc jockey DJ Delbert Wilkins. His stand-up material, which sold well on LP, owed much to the writing abilities of Kim Fuller. During this time, he also spent three years as a DJ on BBC Radio 1, playing soul and electro tracks and introducing some of the characters that he would later popularise on television. He made a guest appearance in the final episode of The Young Ones as The Postman, in 1984.

The first series of The Lenny Henry Show appeared on the BBC in 1984. The show featured stand-up, spoofs such as his send-up of Michael Jackson's Thriller video, and many of the characters he had developed during Summer Season, including Theophilus P. Wildebeeste (based on Teddy Pendergrass) and Delbert Wilkins. A principal scriptwriter for his television and stage shows during the 1990s was Jon Canter. The Lenny Henry Show ran periodically for a further 19 years in various incarnations. Across the incarnations, he performed impressions of various American celebrities such as Beyoncé, Jay-Z, Tina Turner, Prince, Michael Jackson (the two men shared a date of birth), Stevie Wonder, Run-DMC, Cee Lo Green, Denzel Washington and Wesley Snipes.

It was in 1985 that Henry co-founded the British Comic Relief charity organisation, and in 1988 that the first-ever Red Nose Day was celebrated. More than 150 celebrities and comedians, including Henry, took part in an evening-long BBC broadcast, which was watched by 30 million viewers and raised more than £15 million.

Prior to the 1987 general election, Henry lent his support to Red Wedge by participating in a comedy tour organised by the campaign.

In 1987, he appeared in a TV film, Coast to Coast. It was a comedy thriller with John Shea about two DJs with a shared passion for Motown music being chased across Britain. The film has a strong following, but contractual problems have prevented it from being distributed on video or DVD.

=== 1990s ===
In the early 1990s, Henry starred in the Hollywood film True Identity, in which his character pretended to be a white person (using make-up, prostheses, and a wig) to avoid the mob. The film was not commercially successful. In 1991, he starred in a BBC drama alongside Robbie Coltrane called Alive and Kicking, in which he played a heroin addict, which was based on a true story.

Also in 1991, he starred as Josephus the Genie in the BBC Christmas comedy TV film Bernard and the Genie, alongside Alan Cumming and Rowan Atkinson. Moreover, Henry is perhaps best known as the choleric chef Gareth Blackstock from the 1990s television comedy series Chef!, and from his 1999 straight acting lead role in the BBC drama Hope and Glory. He was co-creator with Neil Gaiman and producer of the 1996 BBC drama serial Neverwhere.

Henry appeared as a backing singer on Kate Bush's album The Red Shoes (1993) for the song "Why Should I Love You?" on which Prince played guitar. He also performed, backed by David Gilmour of Pink Floyd, at Amnesty International's Big 3-0 fund raising concert. Henry returned to the BBC to do Lenny Henry in Pieces, a character-based comedy sketch show which was followed by The Lenny Henry Show, in which he combined stand-up, character sketches and song parodies.

The Daily Mail reported in 1994 that Henry was set to star in a biographical film of Billy Strachan's life titled A Wing and a Prayer; however, the script was never turned into a film.

=== 2000s ===
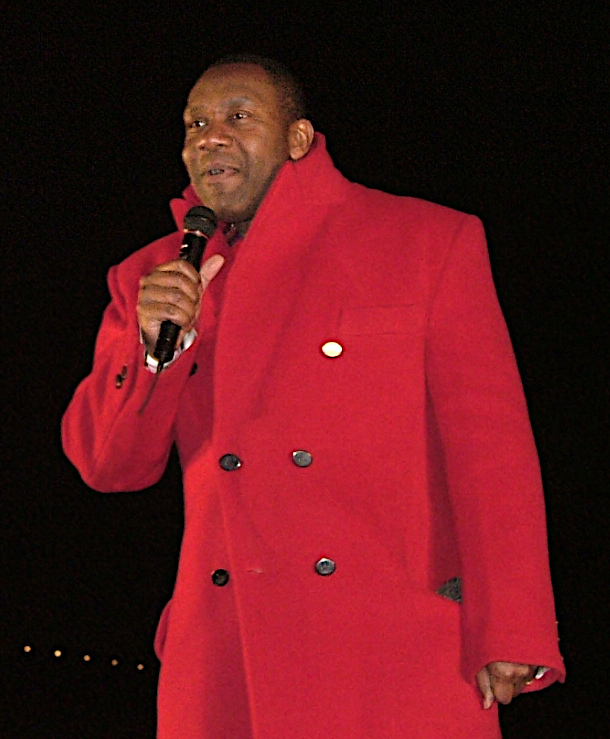
Henry on Red Nose Day 2005

In 2003, Henry was listed in The Observer as one of the fifty funniest acts in British comedy. He was the voice of the British speaking clock for two weeks in March 2003 in aid of Comic Relief.

Henry voiced Dre Head, the "shrunken head" on the Knight Bus, in the 2004 Alfonso Cuarón movie Harry Potter and the Prisoner of Azkaban, and read the audiobook version of Neil Gaiman's Anansi Boys. He also voiced Sporty on the children's show Little Robots. Henry appeared in advertisements for butter products in New Zealand, commissioned by the company now known as Fonterra, as well as portraying Saint Peter in the Virgin Mobile advertising campaign in South Africa. In the UK, he used his character of Theophilus P. Wildebeeste to advertise Alpen muesli, and promoted the non-alcoholic lager Kaliber.

In June 2000, for a BBC documentary, he sailed a trimaran from Plymouth to Antigua with yachtsman Tony Bullimore. In 2005, he appeared in Birmingham, as an act for Jasper Carrott's Rock with Laughter. He appeared alongside performers such as Bill Bailey, Jasper Carrott, Bonnie Tyler, Bobby Davro and the Lord of the Dance troupe. In 2006, Henry starred in the BBC programme Berry's Way. On 16 March 2007, Henry made a cameo appearance as himself in a sketch with Catherine Tate, who appeared in the guise of her character Geordie Georgie from The Catherine Tate Show. The sketch was made for the BBC Red Nose Day fundraising programme of 2007.

On 16 June 2007, Henry appeared with Chris Tarrant and Sally James to present a 25th anniversary episode of Tiswas. The show lasted 90 minutes and featured celebrities discussing their enjoyment of Tiswas as children, as well as appearances from kids and people who had appeared on the original show. In the summer of 2007, he presented Lenny's Britain, a comedy documentary tour made with the Open University on BBC One on Tuesday nights. In late 2007, he hosted a stand-up comedy tour of the UK.

In early 2008, Henry's series lennyhenry.tv was broadcast on BBC One. The programme has an accompanying website of the same name and broadcasts strange, weird and generally amusing online videos and CCTV clips. He starred in the Radio 4 show Rudy's Rare Records. On 31 December 2008 and 1 January 2009, he appeared on Jools Holland's Hootenanny on BBC Two, singing part of the song Mercy along with singer Duffy. In January 2009, he appeared on the BBC's comedy show Live at The Apollo, in which he played host for the night, introducing Andy Parsons and Ed Byrne, where he referred to Wikipedia as "Wrongopedia" for containing incorrect information about his life.

In October 2009, Henry reprised his role of Deakus to feature in comedy shorts about story writing alongside Nina Wadia, Tara Palmer-Tomkinson and Stephen K. Amos. He also offers his own writing tips and amusing anecdotes in the writing tips video clip on BBC raw words – story writing. He supplied the voices of both Big and Small in the CBeebies children's programme Big & Small.

=== 2010s ===
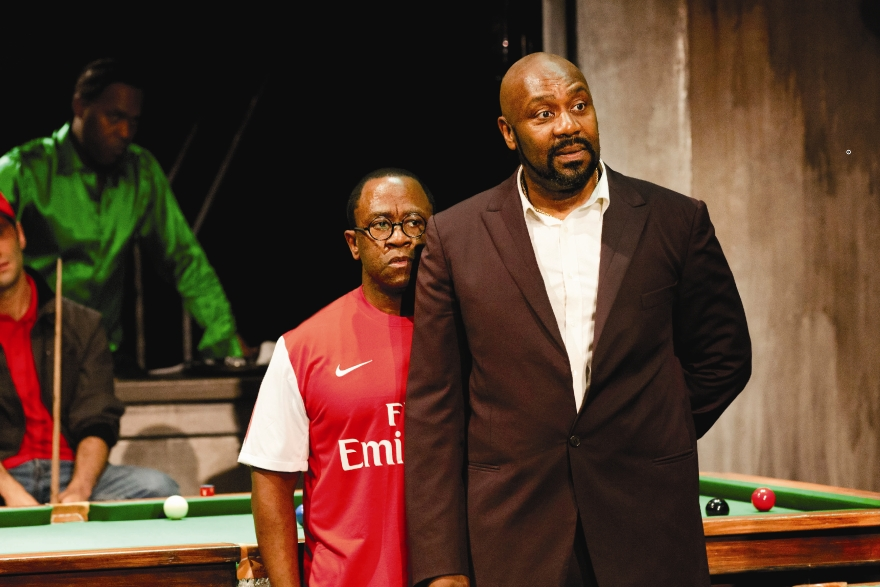
Henry (right) and Lucian Msamati in the Royal National Theatre production of The Comedy of Errors in 2011

In 2010, Henry produced and starred in a five-part web series for the BBC Comedy website, Conversations with my Wife, about a fictional couple conversing over Skype while the wife is away on business leaving the husband (played by Henry) to hold the fort at home.

In 2008, he became the face of budget hotel operator Premier Inn. One of the 2010 adverts caused controversy and was banned from children's programming hours as it parodied a well-known scene from the film The Shining, with Lenny Henry spoofing the scene originally starring Jack Nicholson, smashing a door with an axe and then thrusting his head through the door saying: "Here's Lenny."

In 2011, Henry presented a Saturday-night magic series called The Magicians on BBC One. The show returned in 2012; however, Henry was replaced by Darren McMullen.

In March 2011, he appeared with Angela Rippon, Samantha Womack and Reggie Yates in the BBC fundraising documentary for Comic Relief called Famous, Rich and in the Slums, wherein the four celebrities were sent to Kibera in Kenya, the African continent's largest slum.

Henry was criticised for his opening sketch for the 2011 Comic Relief, during which he spoofed the film The King's Speech and grew impatient with Colin Firth's portrayal of King George VI as he stammered over his speech. The Sun reported that the British Stammering Association had branded the sketch as "a gross and disgusting gleefulness at pointing out someone else's misfortune".

In 2014, Henry appeared in and produced a play based on his radio show Rudy's Rare Records, which played at the Birmingham Repertory Theatre before moving on to a run in London.

Henry wrote Danny and the Human Zoo, a ninety-minute television film shown on BBC One in 2015. Directed by Destiny Ekaragha, it was a fictionalised account of Henry's life as a teenager in 1970s Dudley. Henry played Samson Fearon, a character based on Henry's own father Winston.

In 2017, Henry appeared in a recurring role in the third series of Broadchurch.

In November 2019, it was announced that Henry would guest star in "Spyfall", the two-part opening episode of Doctor Who's twelfth revived series, which broadcast on New Year's Day and 4 January 2020. Henry played technology billionaire Daniel Barton.

=== 2020s ===
In December 2020, Henry was announced as a cast member of Amazon Prime Video's The Lord of the Rings: The Rings of Power. It premiered on 1 September 2022.

In 2021, Henry appeared as a contestant on the second series of The Masked Singer as "Blob". He finished in 6th place.

On 6 November 2021, The Guardian published Black British culture matters, curated by Henry with Marcus Ryder for its Saturday Culture Issue No7.

In 2022, Henry was cast in The Sandman as the voice of Martin Tenbones, a magical, dog-like creature who appears in the dreams of another character called Barbie.

Henry penned Three Little Birds, a six-part drama series, based on and inspired by his mother's Windrush experience and co-written with Russell T Davies, and first broadcast on ITV and ITVX in October/November 2023. On 31 January 2024, Henry announced that he would be hosting Comic Relief for the final time when the fundraiser returned on 15 March.

In 2024, Henry voiced Mr. Convenience in Wallace & Gromit: Vengeance Most Fowl.

== Shakespeare ==
Henry was introduced to the works of Shakespeare when he made the 2006 Radio 4 series Lenny and Will, which saw him going "in search of the magic of Shakespeare in performance". In February 2009, he appeared in the title role in the Northern Broadsides production of Othello at the West Yorkshire Playhouse in Leeds. Before the production opened the director Barrie Rutter said of the decision to cast him: "knives might be out at me or at Lenny. I don't care. This has come about from a completely genuine desire to do a piece of theatrical work. Bloody hell, how long has the Donmar had Hollywood stars going there for £200? He's six-foot five. He's beautifully black. And he's Othello."

Henry received widespread critical acclaim in the role. Charles Spencer in The Daily Telegraph said: "This is one of the most astonishing debuts in Shakespeare I have ever seen. It is impossible to praise too highly Henry's courage in taking on so demanding and exposed a role, and then performing it with such authority and feeling." Michael Billington in The Guardian noted: "Henry's voice may not always measure up to the rhetorical music of the verse, but there is a simple dignity to his performance that touches one." Lynne Walker of The Independent said of Henry that his "emotional dynamism is in no doubt. The frenzy within his imagination explodes into rage and, finally, wretchedness. It's not a subtle reading but it works powerfully in this context."

Henry has said that he saw parallels between himself and Othello. "I'm used to being the only black person wherever I go...There was never a black or Asian director when I went to the BBC. Eventually I thought 'where are they all?' I spent a lot of time on my own. Things have changed a bit, but rarely at the BBC do I meet anyone of colour in a position of power."

The production was scheduled to transfer to the West End of London from 11 September to 12 December 2009, to be performed at the Trafalgar Studios in Whitehall.

In November 2011, Henry made his debut at the Royal National Theatre in London in Shakespeare's The Comedy of Errors, directed by Dominic Cooke, in which he played the character of Antipholus of Syracuse. The production was selected to be broadcast live to selected cinemas worldwide in March 2012 as part of the National Theatre Live programme. Henry's performance gained positive reviews. Paul Taylor in The Independent wrote that "Henry beautifully conveys the tragicomic plight of an innocent abroad."

== Other work ==
=== Music ===
In 2015, Henry was asked by Sky Arts to produce a show for them, Lenny Henry's Got The Blues. He worked with a group of musicians including Jakko Jakszyk, lead singer of King Crimson, to produce the album New Millennium Blues. The album consists of both covers of blues classics, as well as original tracks co-written by Lenny. Henry later released "hard-hitting animated blues video" directed by Iranian filmmaker, Sam Chegini titled The Cops Don't Know which was premiered by Classic Rock magazine on 20 April 2016.

=== Writing ===
Henry has published four books: two autobiographies and two young adult fantasies.

One work, Who Am I, Again? (2019), is a memoir that covers his formative years, starting with the arrival of his parents in Dudley, and ending when he began to experience success in the late 1970s.

Another is Rising to the Surface; it continues his memoirs from the point his first set ended. Rising... covers his rise to fame. Henry begins with his children's show Tiswas and continues through his The Lenny Henry Show, which was broadcast for 20 years, though not continuously.

Henry's two young adult books were written to address his belief that the lack of non-white characters in fantasy was harmful to young adult non-white readers. The Boy With Wings tells the story of a boy who sprouts wings and learns to fly. He and his friends must save the world. The Book of Legends features two black siblings, Bran and Fran, who live with their mother in a small Midlands town. When their mother goes missing, their hunt for her leads them to another world.

== Personal life ==
Henry met Dawn French on the alternative comedy circuit. They married on 20 October 1984 in Covent Garden, London and have one child, an adopted daughter. On 6 April 2010, French and Henry announced they were "amicably" separating after 25 years of marriage. Their divorce was finalised in 2010.

Since 2010, Henry has been in a relationship with casting director and theatre producer Lisa Makin.

Henry obtained a BA Hons degree in English Literature from the Open University in 2007 and an MA in Screenwriting for TV and Film from Royal Holloway, University of London in 2010. He subsequently studied at the latter institution for a Doctor of Philosophy (PhD) degree on the role of black people in the media. In July 2018, Henry was awarded a PhD in media arts for a thesis titled Does the Coach Have to be Black? The Sports Film, Screenwriting and Diversity: A Practice-Based Enquiry. Henry was later awarded an additional honorary doctorate from Royal Holloway in 2024.

Henry has been an open critic of British television's lack of ethnic diversity in its programmes. During a speech at the British Academy of Film and Television Arts in March 2014, he called the lack of minorities "appalling" and he has continued to raise the issue publicly.

In March 2021, Henry wrote an open letter urging everyone, in particular black Britons who were hesitant, to get a COVID-19 vaccination.

Henry is a lifelong supporter of West Bromwich Albion Football Club.

== Honours ==
Henry was appointed a Commander of the Order of the British Empire (CBE) in the 1999 New Year Honours. He received the Lifetime Achievement Award at the British Comedy Awards in 2003. He was knighted in the Queen's 2015 Birthday Honours for services to drama and charity. In July 2016, Henry became the chancellor of Birmingham City University, citing his passion to give life changing opportunities to young people from a wide range of backgrounds. In February 2024, Henry announced that he would step down from the role of Chancellor by the end of the year. Henry has also been listed in the Powerlist of the 100 most influential Black Britons, including ranking fourth in 2016.

In 2016, Henry was made a fellow of the Royal Television Society. Henry was awarded the Alan Clarke Award at the BAFTA TV Awards. Also in 2016, Henry was awarded an honorary doctorate from Nottingham Trent University in recognition of his significant contribution to British comedy and drama, along with his achievements in international charity work.

In 2022, Henry won the Special Recognition award at the 27th National Television Awards.

In 2025, he was made a Freeman of the City of London.

In 2025, Henry was awarded an honorary degree of Doctor of Literature Honoris Causa of the University of London by Royal Holloway.

== Bibliography ==
- Who Am I, Again?, Faber & Faber, 2019; ISBN 978-0571342594, 288 pages.
- Access All Areas, Faber & Faber, 2021; ISBN 978-0571365128, 192 pages.
- Rising to the Surface, Faber & Faber, 2021; ISBN 978-0571368778, 336 pages.
- The Boy with Wings, Macmillan Children's Books, 2021; ISBN 978-1529067835, 224 pages.
- The Book of Legends, Macmillan Children's Books, 2022; ISBN 978-1529067866, 272 pages.
- The Boy With Wings: Attack of the Rampaging Robot, Macmillan Children's Books, 2023; ISBN 978-1035015924, 96 pages.
- You Can Do Anything, Tyrone!, Macmillan Children's Books, 2023; ISBN 978-1529071634, 32 pages.
- The Boy With Wings: Clash of the Super Kids, Macmillan Children's Books, 2023; ISBN 978-1529067897, 224 pages.
- Tyrone's Cool Crown, Macmillan Children's Books, 2024; ISBN 978-1529067804, 32 pages.

== Narration ==
- White Teeth by Zadie Smith (audiobook) 2000
- Anansi Boys by Neil Gaiman (audiobook) 2005
- My Name Is Leon by Kit de Waal (audiobook) 2016
- Who Am I, Again? by Lenny Henry (audiobook) 2019

== Filmography ==
Key
†	Denotes films that have not yet been released

=== Film ===
Lenny Henry' film credits
Year	Title	Role	Notes
1987	Coast to Coast	Ritchie Lee	
1988	The Suicide Club	Cam	
1989	Work Experience	Terence Welles	
1991	True Identity	Miles Pope	
1996	Famous Fred	Fred (voice)	
2004	Harry Potter and the Prisoner of Azkaban	Shrunken Head (voice)	
2007	Take A Bow	Yellow Man	
2008	Take A Bow 2	Yellow Man	
2008	Penelope	Krull (voice)	
2012	The Pirates! in an Adventure with Scientists	Peg-Leg Hastings (voice)	
2014	Postman Pat: The Movie	Mr Bernard: Tow Truck Manager (voice)	
2020	Zog and the Flying Doctors	Narrator	
2023	Trolls Band Together	DJ Cheezie	Voice role
2024	Wallace & Gromit: Vengeance Most Fowl	Mr Convenience	Voice role
2025	Grand Prix of Europe	Erwin	Voice role
2025	Jay Kelly	Larry	
2026	The Magic Faraway Tree	The Great Know-All	

=== Television ===
Lenny Henry' television credits
Year	Title	Role	Notes
1976-1977	The Fosters	Sonny Foster	27 episodes
1978-1981	Tiswas	Lenny Henry / David Bellamy / Tommy Cooper / Trevor Mcdonut / Various characters	Episode: #5.12
1981-1983	Three of a Kind	Himself	3 series
1984-1985, 1987-1988, 1994, 1995, 2004-2005	The Lenny Henry Show	Himself; Delbert Wilkins (1987–1988 sitcom version)	12 episodes
1987-2007, 2011-2024	Comic Relief	Presenter	Television special
1991	Screen One: Alive and Kicking	Stevie 'Smudger' Smith	
1991	Bernard and the Genie	Josephus the Genie	Television film
1992	In Dreams	Lenny / Michael Jackson / Prince	Television film
1993-1996	Chef!	Gareth Blackstock	20 episodes
1999-2000	Hope and Glory	Ian George	16 episodes
2000-2003	Lenny Henry in Pieces	Himself	16 episodes
2003-2005	Little Robots	Sporty (voice)	3 episodes
2003	Lying to Michael Jackson	Michael Jackson	Television short
2008	lennyhenry.tv	Presenter	Television film
2008-2011	Big & Small	Big / Small (voice)	UK dub; 78 episodes
2009-2011	Live at the Apollo	Presenter	2 episodes
2010-2011	Tinga Tinga Tales	Elephant and Buffalo (voice)	35 episodes
2010-2011	Britain's Classroom Heroes	Presenter	2 episodes
2011	The Magicians	Presenter	5 episodes
2011	Rich, Famous and in the Slums	Contributor	Episode: #3.1
2012	Jackanory Junior	Narrator	Episode: "The Enormous Crocodile"
2012	The One Lenny Henry	Various	
2015	Operation Health for Comic Relief	Contributor	Television special
2015	The Olivier Awards	Presenter	Television special
2015	The Syndicate	Godfrey Watson	6 episodes
2015	Danny and the Human Zoo	Samson Fearon	Television film
2017	Broadchurch	Ed Burnett	8 episodes
2018	The Long Song	Godfrey	Episode: #1.1
2020	Doctor Who	Daniel Barton	2 episodes
2020	The Big Night In	Co-presenter	Television special
2020	Back to the...	Presenter	Episode: "80s with Lenny Henry"
2021	The Masked Singer	Himself / Blob (contestant)	Episode: #2.5
2022	My Name Is Leon	Mr Johnson	Television film
2022	Lenny Henry's Caribbean Britain	Presenter	Episodio: #1.1
2022	The Sandman	Martin Tenbones (voice)	2 episodes
2022	The Lord of the Rings: The Rings of Power	Sadoc Burrows	Main role
2022	The Witcher: Blood Origin	Balor	Main role
2023	Three Little Birds	Remuel Drake	Creator, writer & executive producer
2023	Lenny Henry: One of a Kind	Himself	Television documentary
2024	Legends of Comedy with Lenny Henry	Presenter	Television special
2025	Shark! Celebrity Infested Waters	Contestant	Reality show
2025	Perfect Pub Walks with Alexander Armstrong	Guest	One episode
2026	The Split Up	Alex Edwards	

=== Stage ===
Year	Title	Role	Theatre
2009	Othello	Othello	Northern Broadsides; West Yorkshire Playhouse; Trafalgar Studios, London
2011, 2012	The Comedy of Errors	Antipholus of Syracuse	National Theatre, London (Olivier)
2013	Fences	Troy Maxson	UK tour Duchess Theatre, London
2014	Rudy's Rare Records	Adam (also dramaturg and co-creator)	Birmingham Repertory Theatre; Hackney Empire, London
2015	Educating Rita	Frank	Minerva Theatre, Chichester
2017	The Resistible Rise of Arturo Ui	Arturo Ui	Donmar Warehouse, London
2019	King Hedley II	Elmore	Theatre Royal Stratford East, London
2023	August in England	August Henderson (also writer)	Bush Theatre

== Stand-up shows ==
Title	Years	Notes
Where You From?	2007	UK tour
Cradle To Grave	2010	UK & Ireland tour
Lenny Henry: Still At Large	2026	UK tour

== Sources ==
- Margolis, Jonathan. Lenny Henry – A Biography, Orion, 1995; ISBN 978-0-7528-0087-5 196 pages.
