= Lizet Benrey =

Mexican-American painter and actress

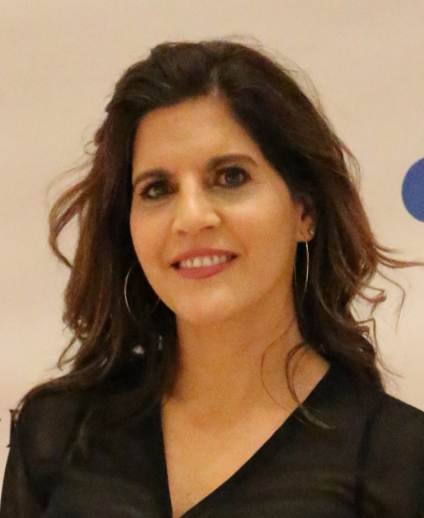
- Benrey in 2019
- Born: Mexico City, Mexico
- Other names: Liz Benrey; Lizet Benrey-Fuller
- Education: Ibero-American University; Boston University; University of California San Diego; Palomar College
- Occupations: Painter; film director; actress
- Known for: Artwork displayed globally
- Notable credit: Glass Casa
- Spouse: Francis Fuller
- Children: 2
- Mother: Shirley Chernitsky
- Website: lizetbenrey.com

Lizet Benrey is a Mexican-American painter, film director and actress whose artwork has been displayed worldwide at cultural institutions, art galleries and museums. She directed a documentary about Leonora Carrington, designed the Premio Corazon Award for the San Diego Latino Film Festival and appeared in the film Glass Casa (2024).

== Personal life ==
Benrey was born in Mexico City, Mexico to Shirley Chernitsky, who taught her how to paint. While attending Ibero-American University, she dated Alejandro González Iñárritu. Benrey went to Boston University, studied printmaking at Palomar College and earned a Bachelor of Arts degree in visual arts at University of California San Diego. She married Francis Fuller and they had two children.

== Career ==
Benrey's work has been on display in the United States, Canada, Mexico, Asia and Europe. She worked with producer Lucy Orozco, narrating a documentary about her own mother and directed a short film called Leonora and Gabriel: An Instant with painter Leonora Carrington, not long before Carrington died. Benrey said her work ethic was inspired by Julian Schnabel, and family friends José Luís Cuevas, Carlos Nakatani and Lucinda Urrusti. The only time Benrey exhibited with her mother was on an exhibition called Women Beyond Borders.

In 2010, Benrey was a member of the selection committee at the San Diego Latino Film Festival and designed their Premio Corazon Award. In 2011, she introduced a screening of Cinco Días sin Nora at CSU San Marcos.

== Museum exhibitions ==
- Artwork was exhibited in 2002 at the International Biennial of Contemporary Art in Florence, Italy
- Paintings on display for Blending Borders in 2003 at Tecate Cultural Center in Tecate, Mexico
- Work exhibition for Art Spirituality in 2003 at Art Institute of California – San Diego in Mission Valley
- Artwork in 2004 at Blue Parrot Bistro in Gettysburg, Pennsylvania.
- Tribute to the Earth, a 2007 solo exhibit at Perry L. Meyer Fine Art in Little Italy, San Diego
- El Viaje – celebrating Latin-born Jewish artists in 2007 that moved to San Diego at Gotthelf Art Gallery at Lawrence Family Jewish Community Center in La Jolla

== Filmography ==
Year	Title	Role	Notes
2005	Shirley Chernitsky: El estallido de la imaginación	Herself	Also producer
2009	Hiram, Life and Rhythm	—N/a	Writer, director, producer, cinematographer
2011	In Defense of Rodin	Camille Claudel	
2012	Leonora and Gabriel: An Instant	—N/a	Short film director, screened at San Diego Latino Film Festival, Arlington International Film Festival, Museo Nacional de Arte, Irish Museum of Modern Art
2012	Tea in a Thunder Cup	Victim's Aunt	
2017	Carving a Life	Rehab Counselor	
2017	Noticed	Renata	by Javier Augusto Nunez
2018	The Witching Hour	Mariela Callahan	Also co-writer and producer, featuring Thom Michael Mulligan and Kari Nissena
2019	Carbon	Kathleen James	
2020	Between Two Minds	Emerson	
2024	Glass Casa	Maria	
