= Centennial Logger =

Bronze Sculpture in Bend, Oregon

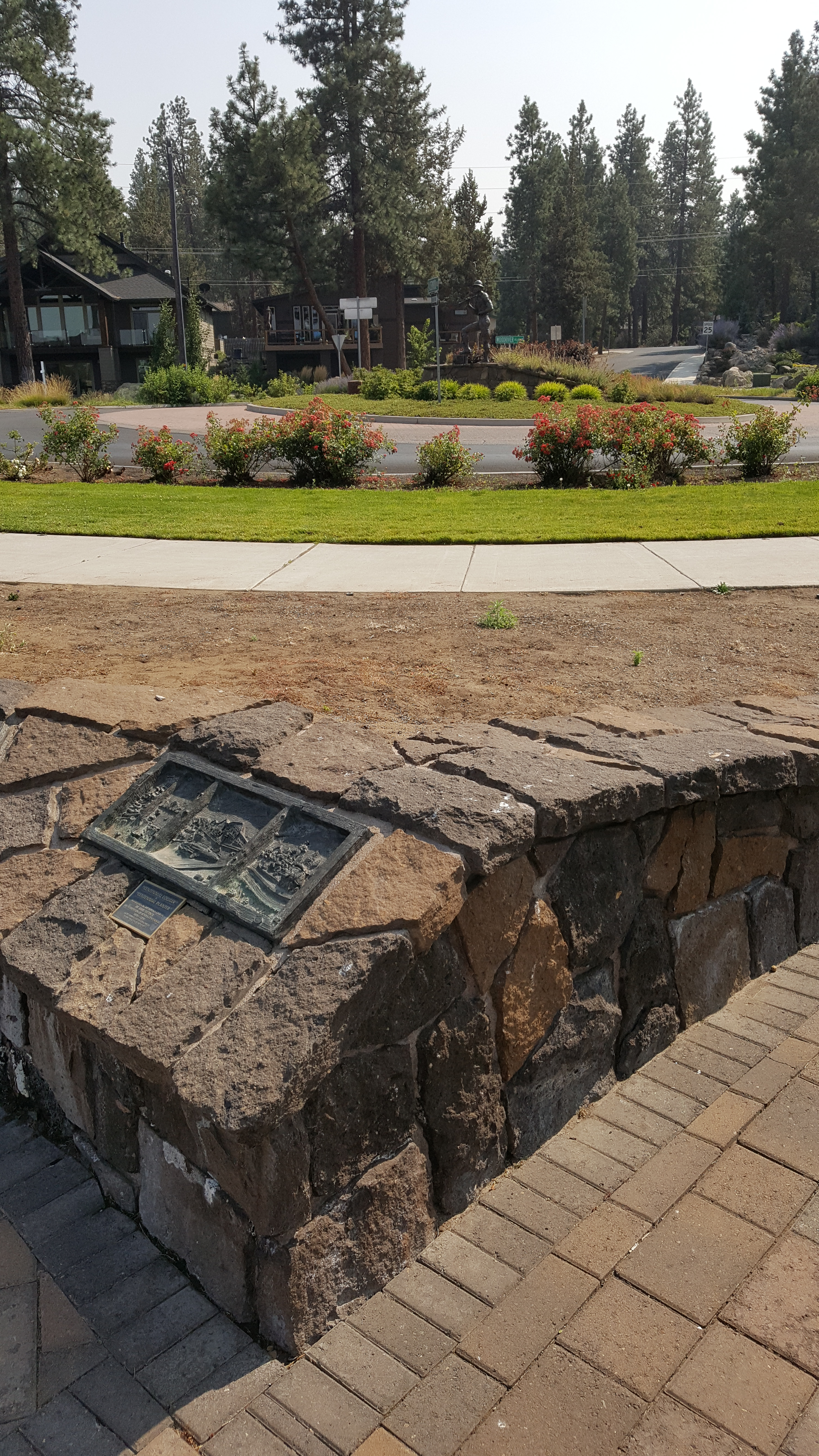
- The sculpture in the background with plaque in the foreground, 2018
- Artist: Jerry Werner
- Year: 2004
- Medium: Bronze sculpture
- Location: Bend, Oregon, United States
- 44.040558°N 121.321729°W

Centennial Logger is an outdoor 2004 bronze sculpture by Jerry Werner, installed along Reed Market Road in Bend, Oregon, in the United States. The statue commemorates the city's centennial anniversary, along with the sculpture Centennial Planter, and depicts a lumberjack holding an axe.

== See also ==
- 2004 in art
- List of public art in Bend, Oregon
