= Downtown Bend Library =

Public library in Bend, Oregon, USA

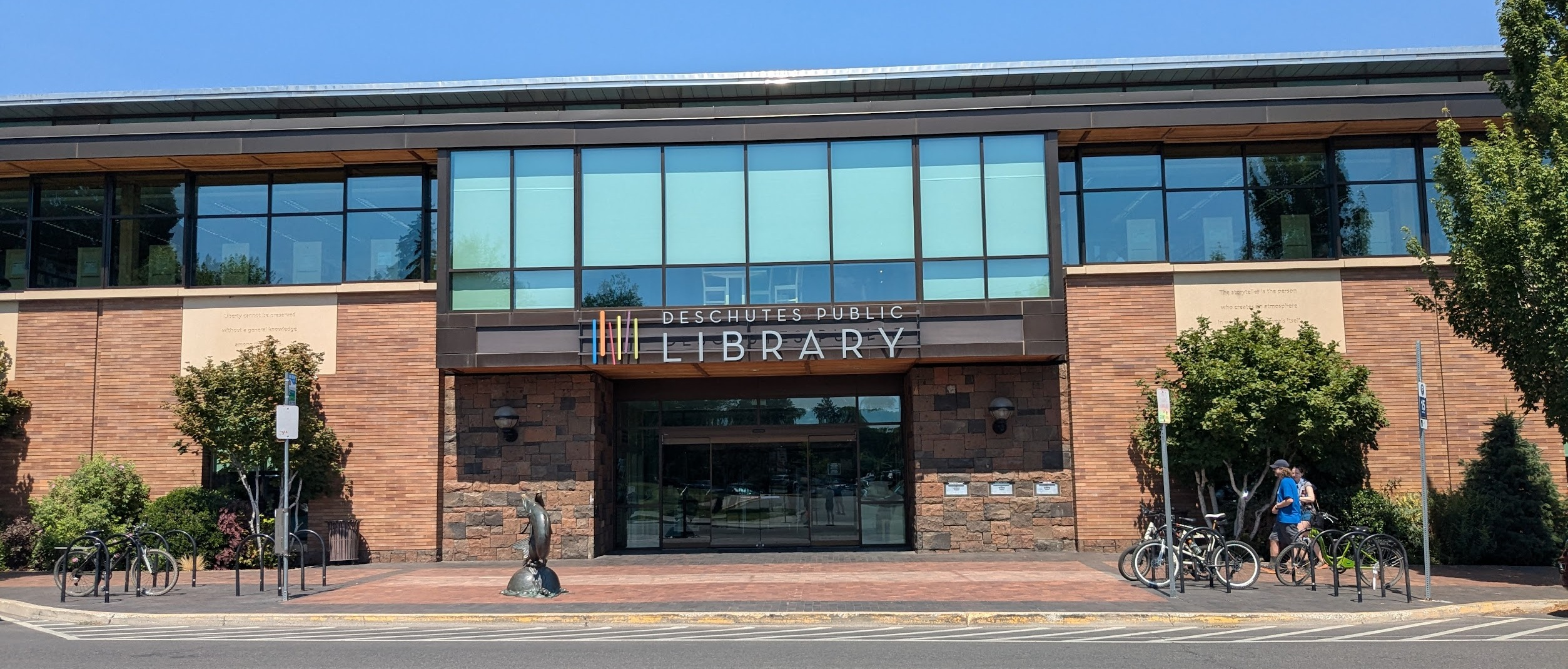
- 44.05711°N 121.31667°W
- Location: 601 NW Wall Street, Bend, U.S.
- Type: public library
- Established: 1998; 28 years ago
- Architects: Thomas Hacker & associates

Other information
- Parent organization: Deschutes Public Library
- Website: www.deschuteslibrary.org/about/libraries/downtownbend

The Downtown Bend Library is a library in Bend, Oregon, United States. The two-story, 38,855-square-foot (3,609.7 m^{2}) building was designed by the Portland-based Thomas Hacker and Associates, and opened in 1998. The library has an annual moden train display.

== See also ==
- Deschutes Public Library
