= Traveller (2012 film) =

- Directed by: Sam Chegini
- Produced by: Sam Chegini
- Edited by: Sam Chegini
- Production company: Sam Pictures Productions
- Release dates: July 2012 (Netherlands Iran)
- Running time: 3 minutes 30 seconds
- Countries: Iran, Netherlands
- Language: English

"Traveller" was recorded for Linde Nijland's album, A Musical Journey, in 2010. The story of the video is based on her lyrics, which portrait a traveller who asks herself questions along the road. Symbolically, the questions are about the meaning of life. The video is intended to convey the astral sense of the song. A 2D computer animation with watercolour paintings were designated for the background, to carry over the softness and pureness of Nijland's voice and music into the video.

== No. 1 Frisian Charts ==
On March 16, 2013, Traveller was voted No.1 by the viewers in the Klipkar+ TV Programme, Frisland, the Netherlands.

== PBS ==
On May 22, 2014, Traveller was voted the best short of the week on REEL13 programme, WNET, PBS.

== Screening ==
- International Noordfolk Festival – August 25, 2012 – Veenhuizen, Netherlands
- Aria Gallery – September 9, 2012 – Tehran, Iran
- Kinofest Digital Films Festival – October 26, 2012 – Bucharest, Romania
- Mowlana theatre, November 14, 2012 – Qazvin, Iran
- Libélula International Animation Festival, Lloret de Mar, Spain, November 22, 2012
- Dishman Art Museum, Texas, February 22, 2013
- Los Angeles – CinemaRtini – March 21, 2013
- Toronto Music Video Festival, March 22, 2013 – Toronto, Canada
- Roxy bar and Screen, April 7, 2013 – London, UK
- Lethbridge Alberta Motion Picture Showcase (LAMPS), April 11, 2013 – Alberta, Canada
- 2nd Free State Film Festival, April 26–28, 2013 – Lawrence, Kansas, United States
- Norman Music Festival Music Video Picks, April 27, 2013 – Norman, Oklahoma, United States
- cIneMAGINE 2013 – May 24, 2013 – Lethbridge, Alberta
- BAYMN FEST 2013 – June 1, 2013 – San Francisco, California, USA
- Sprockets Music Video Festival 2013 – June 15, 2013 – Athens, Georgia, USA
- The Co-operative International Film Festival – July 2013 – Bradford, UK
- Walthamstow International Film Festival – July 14, 2013 – London, UK
- Portobello International Film Festival – August 30, 2013 – London, UK
- Auburn International Film Festival for Children and Young Adults – September 19, 2013 – Sydney, Australia
- Iranian Film Festival San Francisco – September 29, 2013 – San Francisco, California, USA
- Indiana Short Film Festival – October 12, 2013 – Danville, Indiana, USA
- Yerevan, Armenia – Yerevan Animation Festival – October 2013
- Sydney, Australia – Short Soup International Film Festival – January 19, 2014
- Qazvin, Iran – Qazvin Art Center – March 8, 2014

== Awards ==
- The Royal Reel Award – Canada International Film Festival (2013)
- 1st Place – 9th Annual MY HERO International Film Festival in Music Video Category (2013)
- 2nd Place – The 6th Annual Boomtown Film and Music Festival in Experimental/Music Video Category (2013)
