= Deschutes Public Library =

- Deschutes County Library
- U.S. National Register of Historic Places
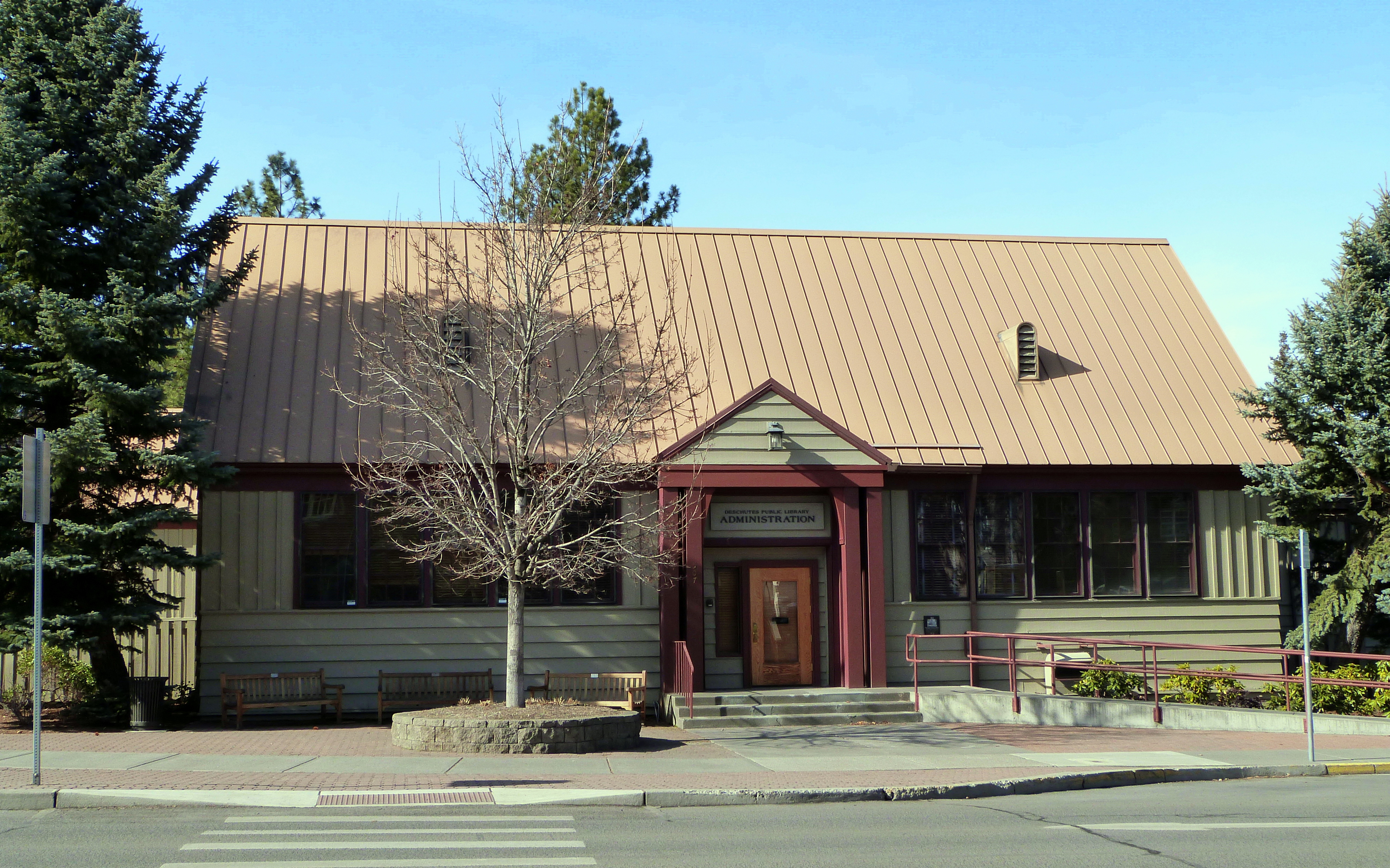
- Deschutes Public Library administration building in 2013

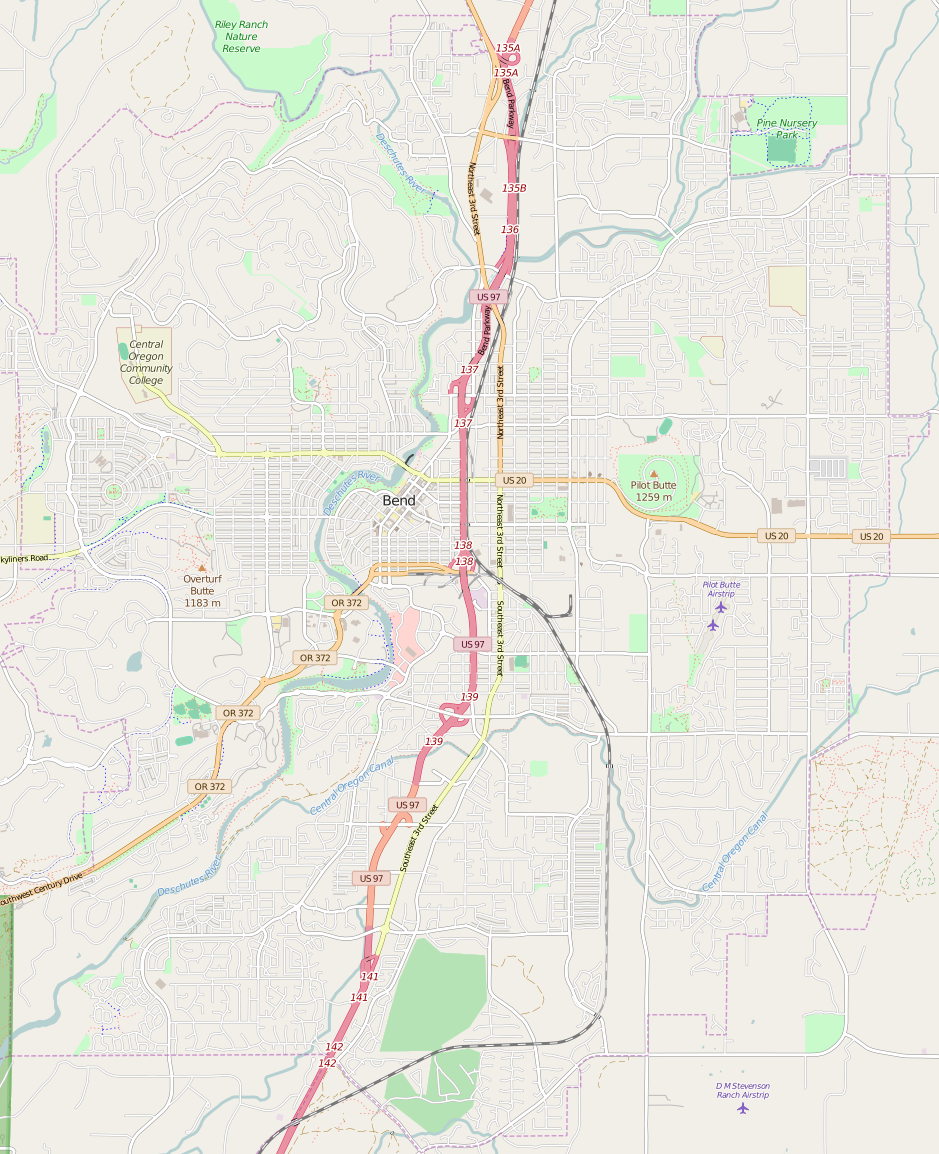
- Location within Bend OR Location within Oregon
- Location: 507 NW Wall St. Bend, Oregon
- Coordinates: 44°3′23″N 121°18′59″W
- Built: 1939
- Architects: Whitehouse & Church; Fred Van Matre Construction Co.
- Architectural style: Late 19th and Early 20th Century American Movements
- MPS: Historic Development of the Bend Company in Bend, Oregon MPS
- NRHP reference No.: 93000914
- Added to NRHP: September 23, 1993

The Deschutes Public Library is a library system that serves Deschutes County, Oregon.

== Branches ==
The library has six branches: one in Redmond, one in La Pine, one in Sisters, one in Sunriver, and two in Bend, including the Downtown Bend Library.

== Administrative building ==
The administrative building, located at 507 N.W. Wall Street in Bend, Oregon, is listed on the National Register of Historic Places. The architect was Whitehouse & Church of Portland.

== Collection ==
As of 2025, the library's collection consisted of over 300,000 physical items.

== See also ==
- National Register of Historic Places listings in Deschutes County, Oregon
