= Riverbend Park (Bend, Oregon) =

- Location within Oregon
- Location: Bend, Oregon, U.S.
- Coordinates: 44.04284°N 121.32086°W
- Area: 13.1 acres (5.3 ha)

Riverbend Park is a 13.1-acre (5.3 ha) along the Deschutes River, near Bend, Oregon's Old Mill District, in the United States. Yakaya is installed in the park.
