= David Govedare =

American sculptor

David Govedare (1950–2021) was an American artist. He is best known for his public semi-abstract steel sculptures and monuments, which are primarily located within the Pacific Northwest. Govedare is known for his unique art style, which fuses Native American themes with large metal sculptures. Govedare frequently appeared on television, featuring on shows such as PBS Northwest Profiles, and he was interviewed by Eric Johnston.

== Life ==
Govedare grew up in Santa Ynez, California, and started working with metal as child, creating lamps with old tin cans. In 1968, he graduated from Santa Ynez Valley High School. He spent most of his adult life working on some of Washington's best-known sculptures. He lived in Chewelah, Washington, spending a decade constructing a strawbale house. Govedere had one son.

== Notable works ==
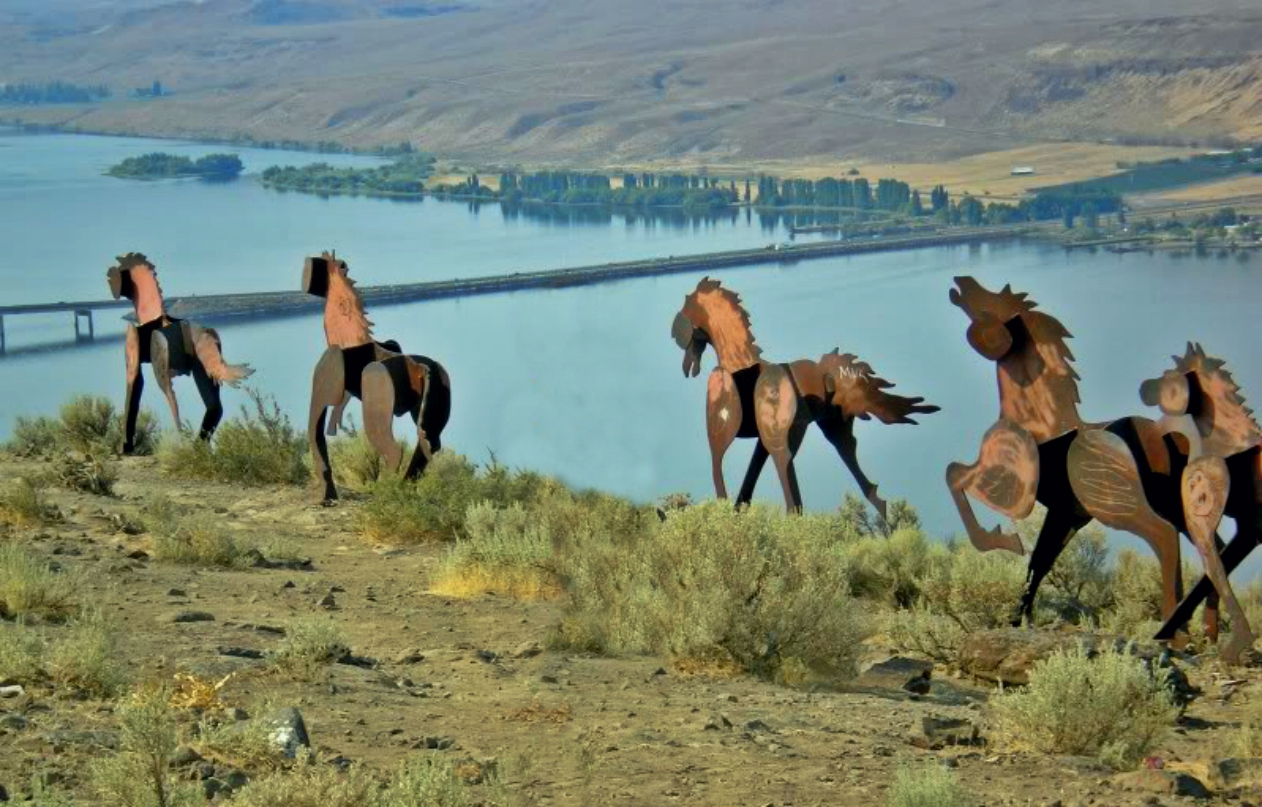
Wild Horses Monument

Grandfather Cuts Loose the Ponies is a significant monument that depicts 15 life-size steel horses which appear to be galloping across a ridge above the Columbia River. According to the Seattle Times, It is estimated to be passed by over 5 million people yearly and is considered to be one of Washington state's most-seen public artworks. In 2017, The Telegraph named it the one of world's most quirky and incredible sculptures.

The Joy of Running Together (also known as the Bloomsday runners), a group of steel runners, created to celebrate the Lilac Bloomsday Run (annual race through Spokane, Washington).

Forms part of work 'Guardians of the Lake'

Guardians of the Lake, a large feather monument, situated on Northwest Boulevard gateway into Coeur d'Alene, Idaho.

Spirit of the Northwest wall sculpture at Rogers High School.

From Shadows and Imagination Into Reality which depicts the original 12 Sisters who formed Holy Family Hospital.

== See also ==
- List of equestrian statues in the United States
- List of public art in Bend, Oregon
