= Traveler (automobile) =

Defunct American motor vehicle manufacturer

The Traveler was an automobile built by the Traveler Motor Car Co of Detroit, Michigan in 1914–15.

Model 36 used a 4-cylinder 3.6L L-head engine. It had a 3-cylinder transmission and a 10 ft wheel base. A 2-seater roadster sold for $1,275 with a 5-seater version at $20 more.

Model 48 had a 6-cylinder 5.6L engine. This model was available in a two-seater and five-seater versions, with a wheel base of 10 ft, 10 in. The five-seater sold for as high as $2,000.
