= The Traveler (sculpture) =

1982 sculpture by Richard Beyer in Bend, Oregon, U.S.

- The sculpture in 2018
- Artist: Richard Beyer
- Year: 1982
- Medium: Aluminum sculpture
- Dimensions: 2.1 m (7 ft)
- Location: Bend, Oregon, U.S.
- 44°3′29.592″N 121°18′54.828″W

The Traveler is a 7-foot (2.1 m) cast aluminum sculpture by Richard Beyer, installed at the corner of Franklin and Wall in Bend, Oregon. The statue, nicknamed "Art", was installed in 1982 and depicts a man sitting on a bench, with two ducks. It was temporarily removed in December 2020 for repairs. People often take photographs with the man, or place objects in his wallet.

== See also ==
- List of public art in Bend, Oregon
