= Jim Dolan (sculptor) =

American sculptor (born 1948)

- Born: 1949 (age 76–77); California, U.S.
- Education: Montana State University
- Known for: Metal sculpture
- Notable work: Bleu Horses; Albert Einstein Between Theorems
- Movement: Western American Art

Jim Dolan (born 1948) is an American sculptor specializing in outdoor larger-than-life bronze and steel sculptures, especially of Montana-related subjects and wildlife. He has created a number of large scale multiple element sculptures, and over 170 works of public art. He currently lives in Belgrade, Montana. He has created works in steel, copper and brass.

Dolan grew up near Livermore, California, and came from a ranching background. He first came to Montana in 1966, moving from California to attend Montana State University, where he graduated in 1970 and ultimately obtained a master's degree in agriculture.

He took a welding class at the college and that was when he began to create metal sculptures, starting with nails and other small bits of metal. He petitioned the college to be granted in-state tuition, arguing that he intended to live in Montana permanently and be an asset to the state.

Over the course of his career, he has donated four sculptures to Montana State University, and Bleu Horses, which he built over 15 months and with his own money, is dedicated to the people of Montana. His work at MSU includes a statue of Walt Whitman placed near Wilson Hall, the campus's liberal arts building, and near the Museum of the Rockies is "Rusty," a draft horse. However, a significant number of his public art sculptures are installed in the eastern United States.

Dolan's career as a full-time artist took off after he finished a commission in 1979 to place a flock of geese inside the terminal of Bozeman Yellowstone International Airport. His most recent large-scale installation is Bleu Horses, a set of 39 horse sculptures made primarily of steel and permanently installed on a hillside off highway 287 just north of Three Forks, Montana.

Dolan has created other complex outdoor sculptures in Montana, including a herd of elk placed upon the lawn of a bank in Bozeman, and a fly fisherman sculpture in Ennis. A whimsical work, Albert Einstein Between Theorems, was a 2012 ArtPrize entry, and is now permanently installed at Western Michigan University. A sculpture of a golden eagle, with a 36-foot (11-metre) wingspan, is in Osaka, Japan.

His work often contains whimsical elements, such as a Frisbee-throwing statue of Albert Einstein, said to be "taking a moment for lighthearted joy amidst his important work," or one of the Bleu Horses which is "pooping"—evidenced by a small pile of round stones placed on the ground beneath the animal's raised tail. A statue in Bozeman of Malcolm Story, a descendant of Montana pioneer Nelson Story, incorporates the distinctive waxed mustache and plaid coat worn by the eccentric gentleman in his later years.

== Selected works ==
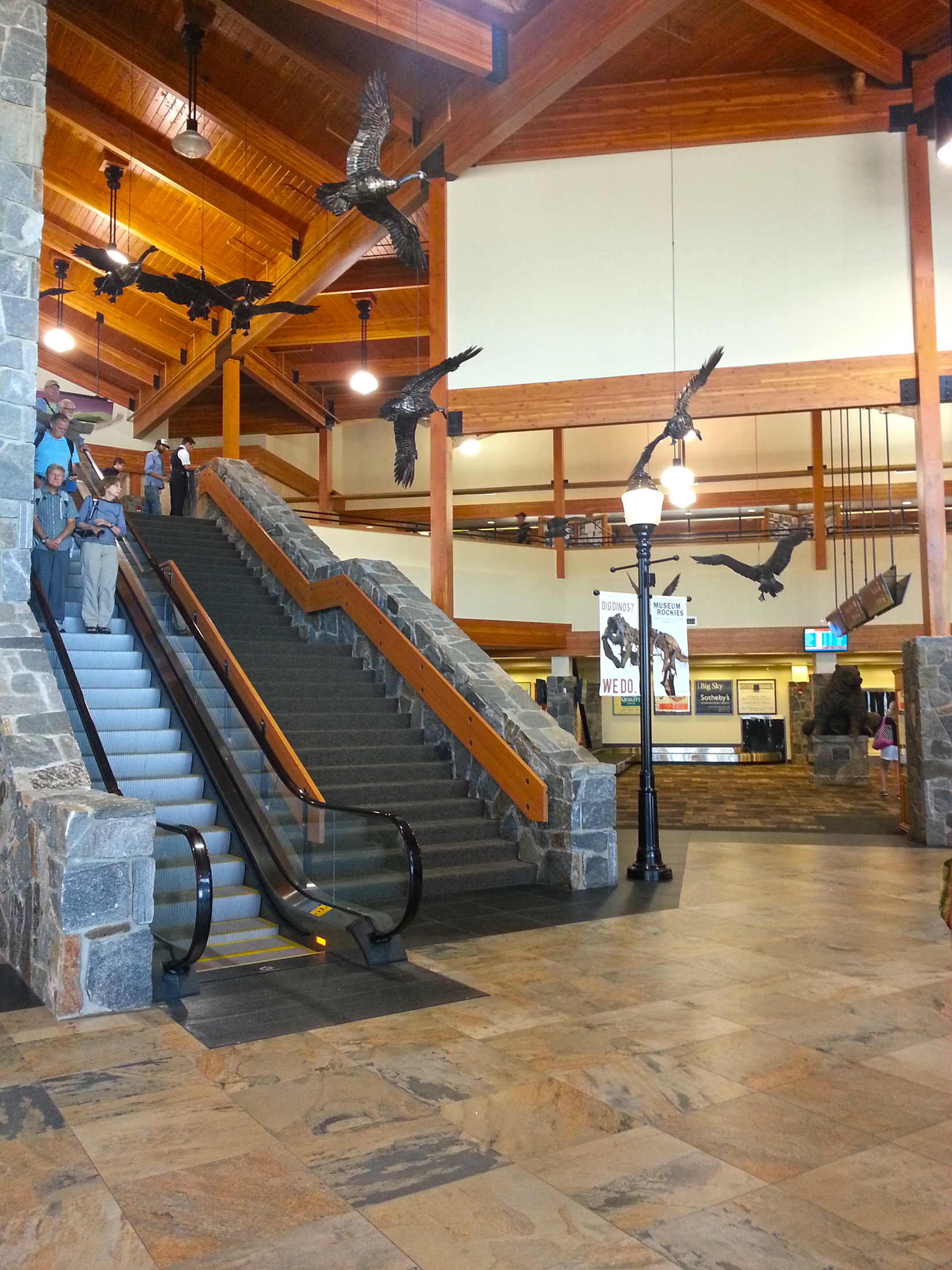
Flock of Geese in Bozeman Yellowstone International Airport terminal
