= Wheat Montana =

Wheat Montana was a family owned Montana corporation that included wheat farming, flour milling, production of sliced bread and hamburger buns, as well as multiple deli locations throughout the state.

Previously owned by the Folkvord family, the company is an example of local value-added manufacturing. In 2015, the Folkvord family sold its milling operations and bakeries to Tilia, LLC; a Chicago based private investment firm. In January 2019, the Folkvords sold the farm to another family, who changed the name of the farm from Wheat Montana Farm, to Living Sky Grains. Living Sky Grains continued to supply wheat to the Wheat Montana company after the sale.

Tilia, LLC changed nothing regarding the operations, name, or product lineup. Even though the sale occurred in 2015, as of 2026 many consumers are not aware of it, and still consider Wheat Montana to be a Montana-owned company.

The original farm and first Wheat Montana Deli are located in Three Forks, in southwestern Montana.
