= Crockett Street =

- Facade row, 200 block of Crockett
- U.S. Historic district – Contributing property
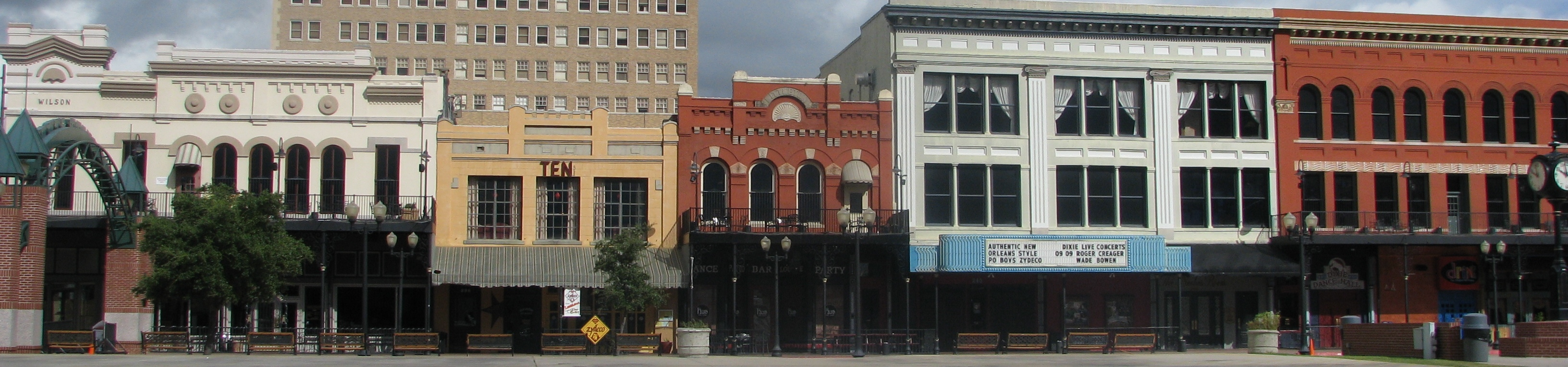
- Crockett St. facades in 2010

- Location within Texas Location within the United States
- Location: 200 block of Crockett St. Beaumont, Texas
- Coordinates: 30°05′05″N 94°05′56″W
- Area: less than one acre
- Built: c. 1900
- Architectural style: Classical Revival, Italianate
- Part of: Beaumont Commercial District (ID78002959)
- Designated CP: April 14, 1978

The Crockett Street Dining and Entertainment Complex is located in Downtown Beaumont, Texas. It consists of five restored buildings built at the turn of the 20th century. They were used for various businesses then, but now host restaurants and various entertainment venues. From left to right, the historic names are: Wilson Building, Littleton Building, Millard Building, Dixie Hotel.

== See also ==
- National Register of Historic Places listings in Jefferson County, Texas
