= Art in Public Places =

Public art programs

Art in Public Places (AiPP) is a common term for public art programs at the local government level (cities, countries). Public art is significant within the art world, amongst curators, commissioning bodies and practitioners of public art, to whom it signifies a working practice of site specificity, community involvement and collaboration. It can be both permanent and temporary, internal and external, and large or small scale. The term does not refer to public art in general or to individual public artworks. Art in Public Places programs are publicly administered, often overseen by public art review committees and permanent staff (Arts Coordinators). Under the auspices of local government they may receive public funding as well as private funding. Public art is art in any media that has been planned and executed with the intention of being staged in the physical public domain. Street art in Melbourne These are examples of how councils of Melbourne allow artists to show their talents to the world.
