= Boomtown Film and Music Festival =

American film and music festival

The Boomtown Film and Music Festival was a film and music festival held in Beaumont, Texas from 2008 to 2017: it was established after the Spindletop Film Festival was discontinued in 2006. It was held at various businesses in Downtown Beaumont, including the Art Studio, Jefferson Theatre, Crockett Street and the Art Museum of Southeast Texas.

== History ==
=== 2009 line up ===
Bands
ADAM DAVID AND THE FREEWHEELERS
ASHLYNN IVY
BLANKBERRY
COUSIN PHELPY
DAYLIGHT BROADCAST
DEARLY BELOVED
ECHOLANE
EXIT THE SUN
FATHERS AGAINST PARADES
GONZO SIRENS
JUDAS FEET
THE LAST STARFIGHTER
THE LOCH
MIKE TRUTH & THE REPLACEMENT KILLERS
NICE WORK IF YOU CAN GET IT
KNUCKLE DEEP
RADIO REVIVAL
THE SCRAPS
THE SHAMMIES
SOURMASH
SOUTHERN EMBERS
THE STATEMENT
WE WERE WOLVES
WEREDRAGON SCHOLARS
THE WINTER DANCE PARTY

Films

=== 2010 line up ===
Bands
Double Knucle Band
David Lee Kaiser
Chris Dozier
Good Old Boys
Zacharias Silas
Hello Chief
Till We're Blue or Destroy
DJ Tanner
White Sails
Closet Drama
The Shammies
Rocky Moon and Bolt
Scott H. Biram
Ultrasuede

Films
