= Skyview Elementary School =

Skyview Elementary School may refer to:

- Skyview Elementary School, Macon, Georgia; Bibb County School District
- Skyview Elementary School, Spokane, Washington; East Valley School District (now closed)

== See also ==
- Skyview School (disambiguation)
