= Pullman High School =

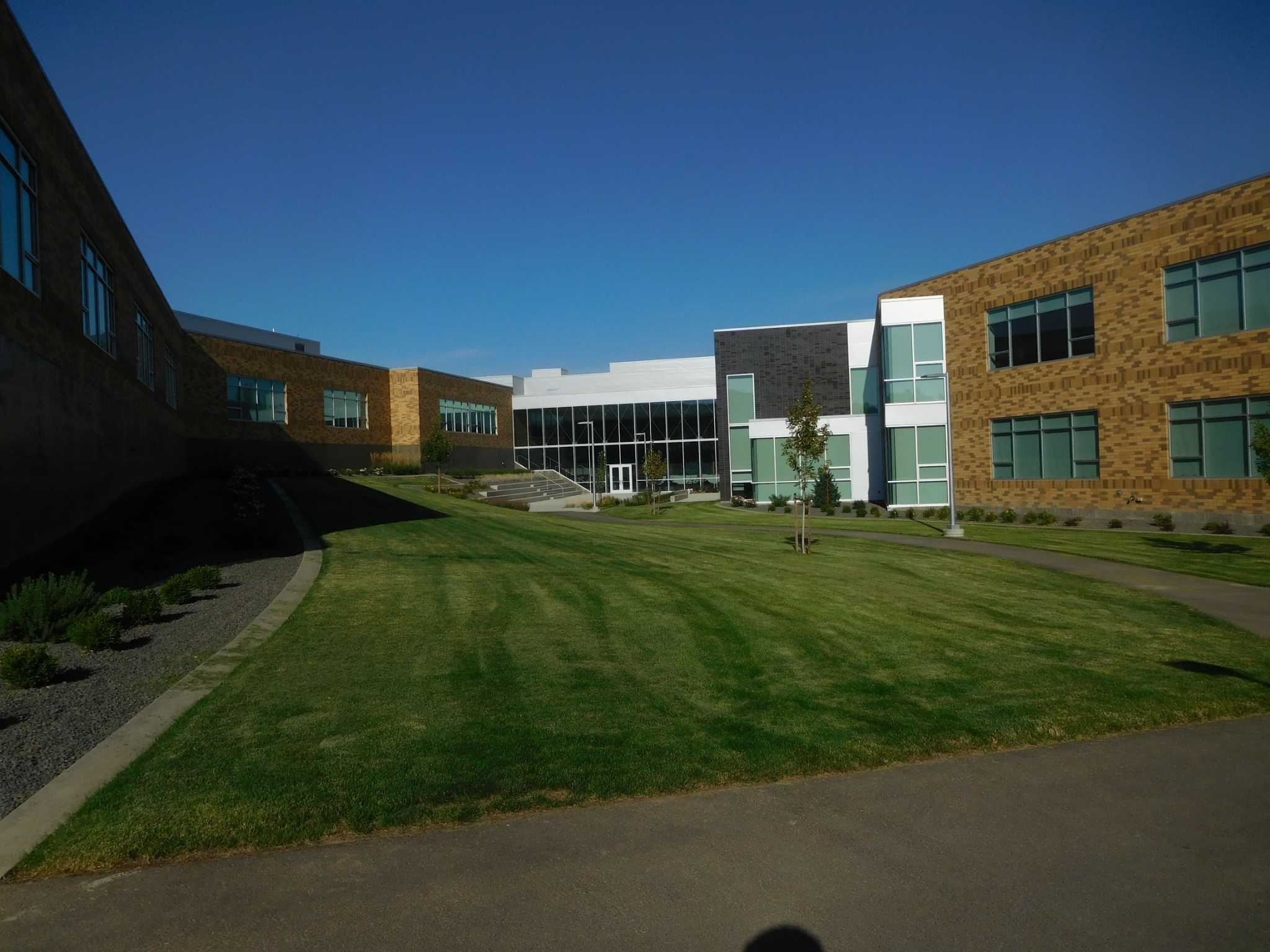
- PHS in 2016

Location
- 510 NW Greyhound Way; Pullman, Washington 99163; United States; 46.747°N 117.186°W

Information
- Type: Public
- Established: c. 1890, 1972 (current)
- School district: Pullman S.D. (#267)
- CEEB code: 480935
- NCES School ID: 530693001020
- Principal: Juston Pollestad
- Teaching staff: 47.69 (FTE)
- Grades: 9–12
- Enrollment: 855 (2023–2024)
  - Grade 9: 183
  - Grade 10: 216
  - Grade 11: 242
  - Grade 12: 214
- Student to teacher ratio: 17.93
- Classrooms: 60
- Colors: Blue & Gray
- Athletics: WIAA Class 2A, District Seven
- Athletics conference: Greater Spokane League
- Mascot: Greyhounds
- Rivals: Moscow High School, Clarkston High School
- Newspaper: The Paw Print
- Yearbook: Kamiaken
- Feeder schools: Lincoln Middle School
- Elevation: 2,590 ft (790 m) AMSL
- Website: phs.pullmanschools.org/

Pullman High School is a public secondary school in the city of Pullman, Washington, the home of Washington State University.

It is the only traditional public high school in the city and in the Pullman School District (#267). A four-year high school, it accepts students from Lincoln Middle School in Pullman (fed by four public elementary schools: Franklin Elementary School, Sunnyside Elementary School, Jefferson Elementary School, Kamiak Elementary School) and other schools around the area in different towns. Pullman High School's mascot is the greyhound and the school colors are blue and gray.

== History ==
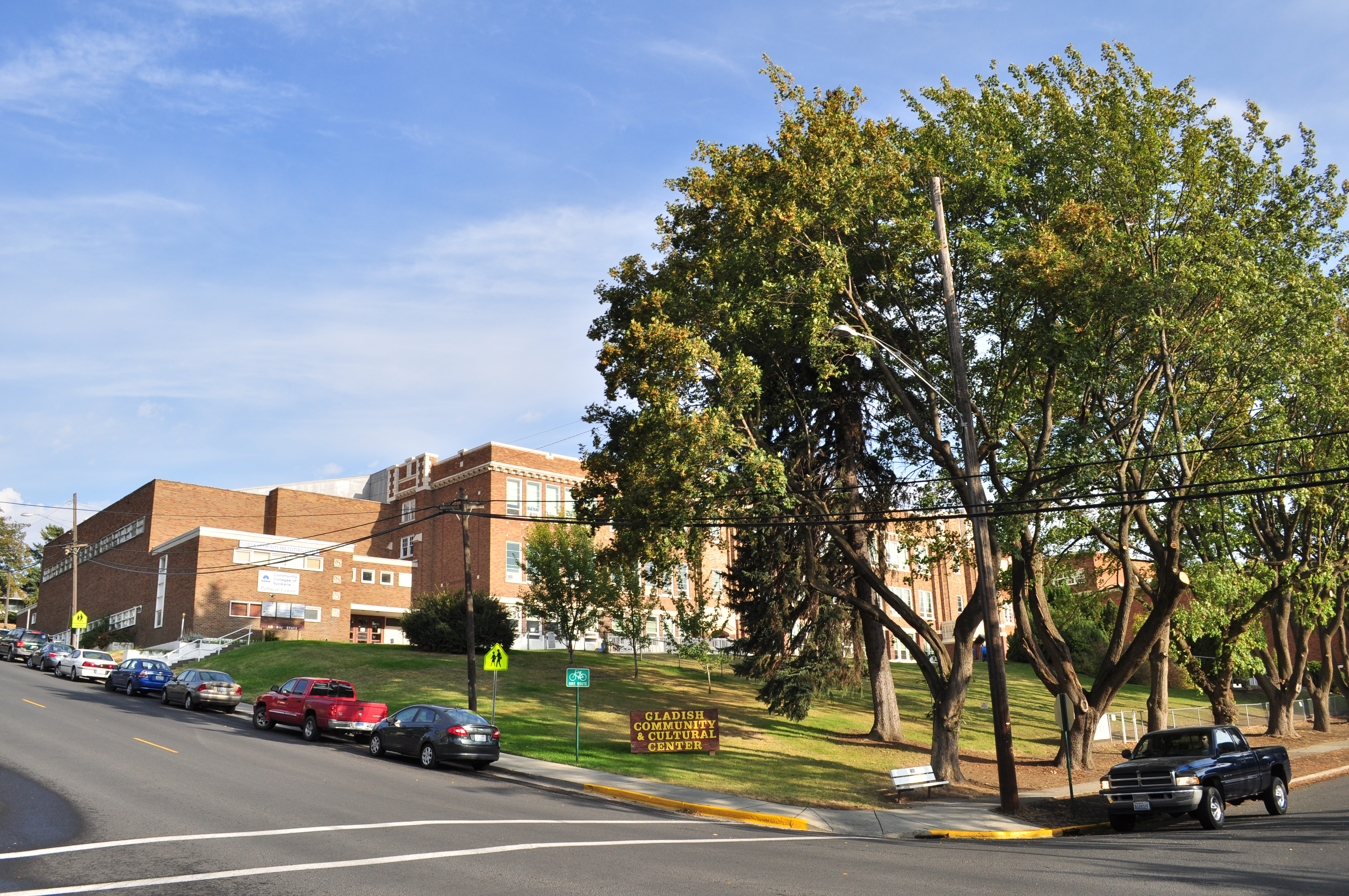
Old Pullman High School now Gladish Community & Cultural Center

Pullman High School formerly occupied the building that is now the Gladish Community & Cultural Center at Main and State Streets (46.7306°N 117.1833°W). Built in 1929, it closed as PHS in 1972 and was added to the National Register of Historic Places in 1998.

The present campus opened 54 years ago in September 1972 as an "open concept" design with minimal walls. It is located on Military Hill at the northwest outskirts of the city. The $2.8 million bond for the new school was approved by voters in November 1969, with 61.5% in favor.

== New facilities ==
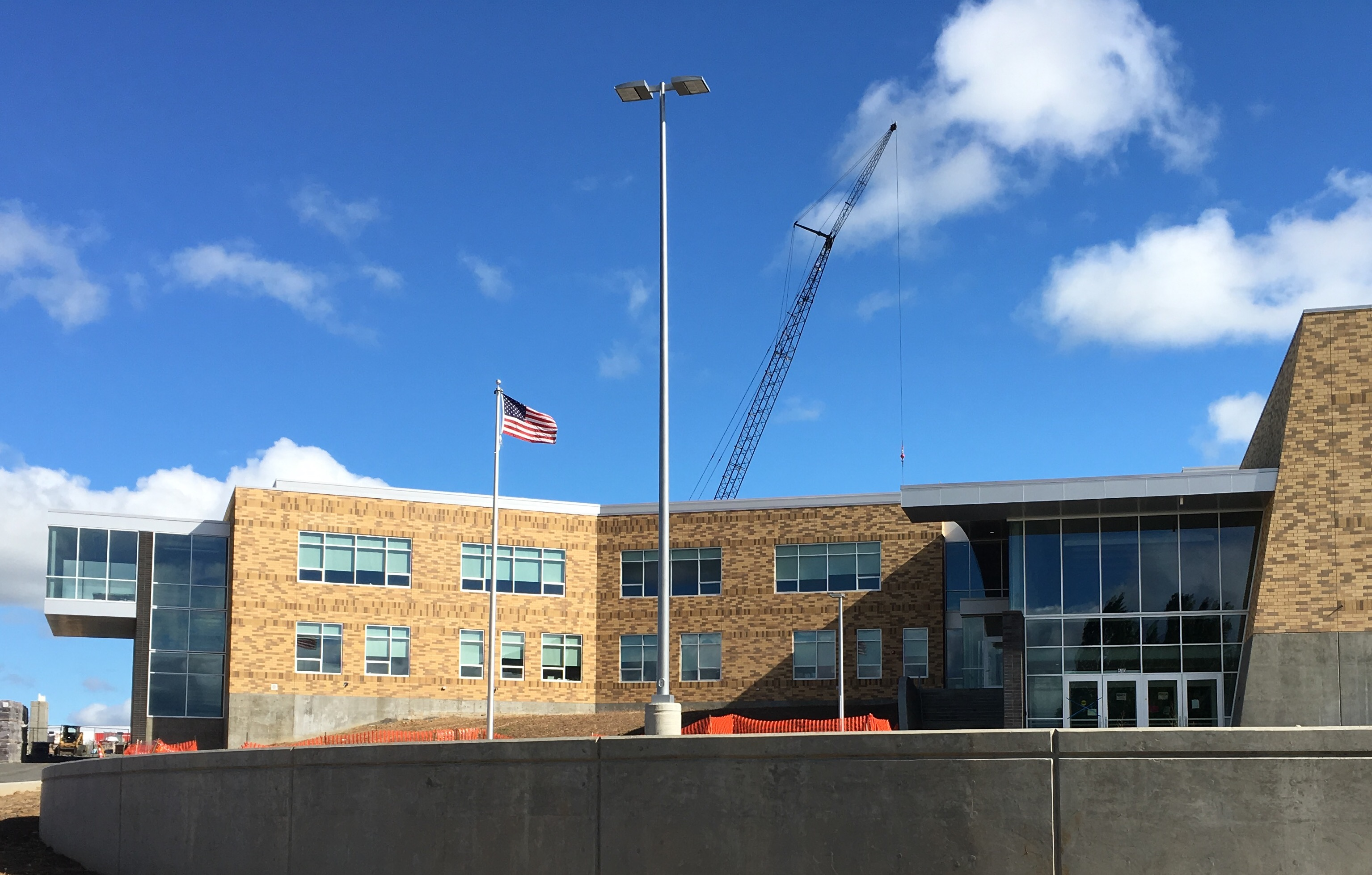
Outside of PHS's new facilities.

In February 2013, a $60 million bond to remodel Pullman High School passed by 87 percent.

The new school was designed by a NAC Architecture, and construction was completed in 2018. The new school is structured with central spine that runs the length of the school on all three levels, with the school's commons located in the center so as to act as a central social gathering space for the school. The ground level is host to a new competition gym as well as a new set of locker rooms. Three classroom wings branch off the central spine in an east–west orientation designed to optimize day lighting and sunlight control, at the end of each wing lays a collaboration space outfitted with large windows that offer views over the stadium and beyond. The new facilities also incorporate elements of the famous Palouse rolling hills, with a predominately earth-toned stone exterior articulated to imitate the lines and textures present in the local landscape.

== Awards ==
- PHS was named a national Blue Ribbon School in 2008.
- In 2014, Pullman High School received the Washington Achievement Award.
- Pullman High School's building received an Honor Award at the AIA Washington Council's 2018 Civic Design Awards ceremony for its thoughtful design and overall aesthetic.
- The U.S. Department of Education announced on April 22 that Pullman Public Schools are among the 2020 U.S. Department of Education Green Ribbon School District Sustainability Awardees.

== Athletics ==
Pullman High School is a member of the Greater Spokane League (2A), and offers football, volleyball, wrestling, basketball, cheerleading, swimming, cross-country, track and field, golf, tennis, baseball, softball, soccer, as well as numerous other extracurricular activities.

In the 2004–2005 school year, Pullman won the state championship (Class 2A) in baseball and girls' track and field. In the following school year the Greyhounds added the football and volleyball championships as well as another in girls' track and field. In the 2006–2007 school year girls swim went almost undefeated in their pre district meets. In the 2007–08 school year, football, volleyball, girls' swim, baseball, softball, track (both), girls' basketball, tennis (both), and swim (boys) all participated in their state tournaments. For the 2008-09 year, football finished fifth in state, volleyball finished fourth in state, boys basketball went eighth in state, while the girls were fifth. The softball team won its first league title in 2009.

Pro Football Hall of Fame quarterback John Elway attended Pullman High for his freshman year (1975–76) after attending Lincoln Middle School. His father Jack was an assistant football coach at Washington State for four seasons, from 1972 through 1975, under head coach Jim Sweeney. When Sweeney left after the 1975 season, Jack became the offensive backfield coach at neighboring Idaho in February 1976, but then was hired as the head coach at Division II Cal State Northridge six weeks later. The Elways moved to the San Fernando Valley in southern California, and John played his final three years of high school football at Granada Hills High School in Granada Hills, and graduated in 1979.

PGA Tour star Kirk Triplett (class of '80) attended Pullman High all four years, and then accepted a golf scholarship to the University of Nevada in Reno, where he graduated in 1985 with a degree in civil engineering. Triplett joined the PGA Tour in January 1990 and the PGA Tour Champions when he became eligible in the spring of 2012.

NFL quarterback Timm Rosenbach moved to Pullman from Montana after his sophomore year and graduated from PHS in 1985. He played college football in town for the WSU Cougars under head coach Dennis Erickson and then professionally for several seasons.

Linebacker J. C. Sherritt (2006) helped lead Eastern Washington to the 2010 FCS national championship, was named the Big Sky Conference Defensive Player of the Year, and won the Buck Buchanan Award as the FCS' top defensive player of the year. He played eight years in the Canadian Football League with the Edmonton Eskimos; he was named a CFL West All-Star, CFL All-Star, and also named the CFL's Most Outstanding Defensive Player.

== Extracurricular activities ==
Pullman High School offers over 35 club opportunities for students, many of which compete at the state and national levels. Both the DECA and VICA programs had students in the national competitions. PHS Science Bowl team regularly advances to Nationals in Washington, D.C., and were regional champions from 2002–2019, with the exception of 2009 and 2016 where they took second place.

For the 16th year in a row Pullman High School finished in the top 10 in the 2018-19 WIAA Scholastic Cup, a competition that combines the academic and athletic excellence of a school.

== Demographics ==
Student Ethnicity as of 2019:

- 71.1% White
- 9.6% Asian
- 9.5% Hispanic/Latino
- 4.9% Two or More Races
- 3.1% Black/African American
- 0.6% American Indian/Alaskan Native
- 0.4% Native Hawaiian/Other Pacific Islander

== Notable alumni ==
- Michael Baumgartner, Representative for Washington's 5th congressional district, Spokane County Treasurer (2019–2025), former state senator from the 6th district (2011–2019), and runner-up for U.S. Senate in 2012
- William B. "Red" Reese, longtime three-sport head coach at Eastern Washington State College (now EWU); class of 1920.
- Stan Fanning, NFL lineman, class of 1956.
- John Fabian, NASA astronaut, class of 1957.
- Karl Benson, intercollegiate athletics commissioner of the Sun Belt Conference, Western Athletic Conference, and Mid-American Conference, class of 1970.
- Pat Beach, NFL tight end, class of 1978.
- Kirk Triplett, PGA Tour and PGA Tour Champions golfer; class of 1980.
- Gretchen Rehberg, Bishop of Episcopal Diocese of Spokane; class of 1982.
- Timm Rosenbach, NFL quarterback, class of 1985.
- Tyson Motsenbocker, songwriter, class of 2004.
- J. C. Sherritt, CFL linebacker, class of 2006.
- David Ungerer, CFL wide receiver, class of 2014.
- Young Jean Lee, American Playwright, first Asian-American woman to have play produced on Broadway, class of 1992.
