= East Valley High School (Spokane, Washington) =

Location
- 15711 E Wellesley Ave; Spokane Valley, Washington; United States; 47°42′09″N 117°11′38″W

Information
- Type: Public High School
- Established: 1960
- School district: East Valley School District
- NCES School ID: 530228000312
- Principal: Ryan Arnold
- Staff: 48.31 (FTE)
- Grades: 9-12
- Enrollment: 957 (2022-2023)
- Student to teacher ratio: 19.81
- Colors: Green, Black & White
- Athletics: Baseball; Basketball; Football; Wrestling; Soccer; Track; Cheerleading; Swimming; Tennis; Softball; Golf; Cross Country Running
- Athletics conference: Greater Spokane League
- Mascot: Knights
- Rival: West Valley High School
- Yearbook: Shield
- Website: EVHS Website

East Valley High School (also known as EVHS) is a large public high school located in Spokane Valley, Washington at the corner of Sullivan and Wellesley. East Valley provides educational opportunities to nearly 1,000 students in grades 9–12. Located on a scenic 40-acre (160,000 m^{2}) site, the high school campus includes athletic fields, two gyms, twelve tennis courts, a track, and a fitness center.

== History ==
The original East Valley High School opened its doors in the fall of 1960 and graduated its first class in 1961. The original school, located on the corner of Sullivan and Wellesley, was built with the capability to house approximately 600 students. This facility served students from 1960 to 1989. A bond issue passed by voters in 1986 provided funding for a remodel of the original facility. While many portions of the 1960 building still stand, the 10 million dollar expansion created a new facility designed to support more than 1,600 students. Opening in 1989, the new high school has provided many years of service to its students and community.

=== Notable achievements ===
In the spring of 2014, the school's Knowledge Bowl team placed first in the Regional competition and second in the 2A division in Arlington, WA in the state tournament. For the first time in East Valley history, in the Spring of 2015, the team placed first in the Regional competition and 2A division in Arlington, WA in the state tournament. The following year, in the Spring of 2016, the team again placed first in the Regional competition and 2A division in Arlington, WA in the state tournament.

=== Golden Plunger ===
Golden Plunger is a wrestling tournament between EVHS and West Valley High School. The tournament precedes Golden Throne, and traditionally has a theme.

=== Golden Throne ===
EVHS and its rival school West Valley High School participate in an annual spirit competition known as Golden Throne. Before the game, the school has a spirit week to promote the game and pride. It's a tradition at East Valley that one of the spirit days be "Geeky Eagle Day" as a satirical celebration of the friendly rivalry between schools. The last school day before the game, there is an assembly to teach students cheers pertaining to the theme, preview performances, introduce the ASB officers as characters from said theme, and encourage crowd etiquette. The venue varies between one of the school's gymnasiums depending on the year. The competition traditionally consists of two basketball games (one with the girls' varsity team and one with the boys') with themed skits that incorporates the school's clubs, faculty, and student leadership, and feature performances from the cheerleaders in between quarters and at halftime. Both schools also organize community dances in which their students and faculty go to the gym floor and participate in a flash mob-like routine. The points scored in the games do not determine the victor of the competition, as it is based on school spirit, crowd participation, and good sportsmanship. After the game, the hosting school has a mixer no matter the outcome, and both West Valley and East Valley students are welcome to attend.

== Description ==
=== Location ===
East Valley High School is located at E. 15711 Wellesley Spokane, Washington. It is near East Valley Middle School.

=== Demographics ===
As of May 2022, there was a total of 971 students: 497 males, 469 females, and 5 students of gender x. White students have the biggest ethnic representation at 76.9%, with Hispanic/Latino following at 11.7%, Asian/Pacific Islander at 3%, African-American at 0.8%, and American Indian/Alaskan Native at 1.4%.

== Notable alumni ==
- Eric Johnson (1980's)- currently weeknight news anchor for KOMO 4 in Seattle.

== See also ==
East Valley School District
