= Shadle Park High School =

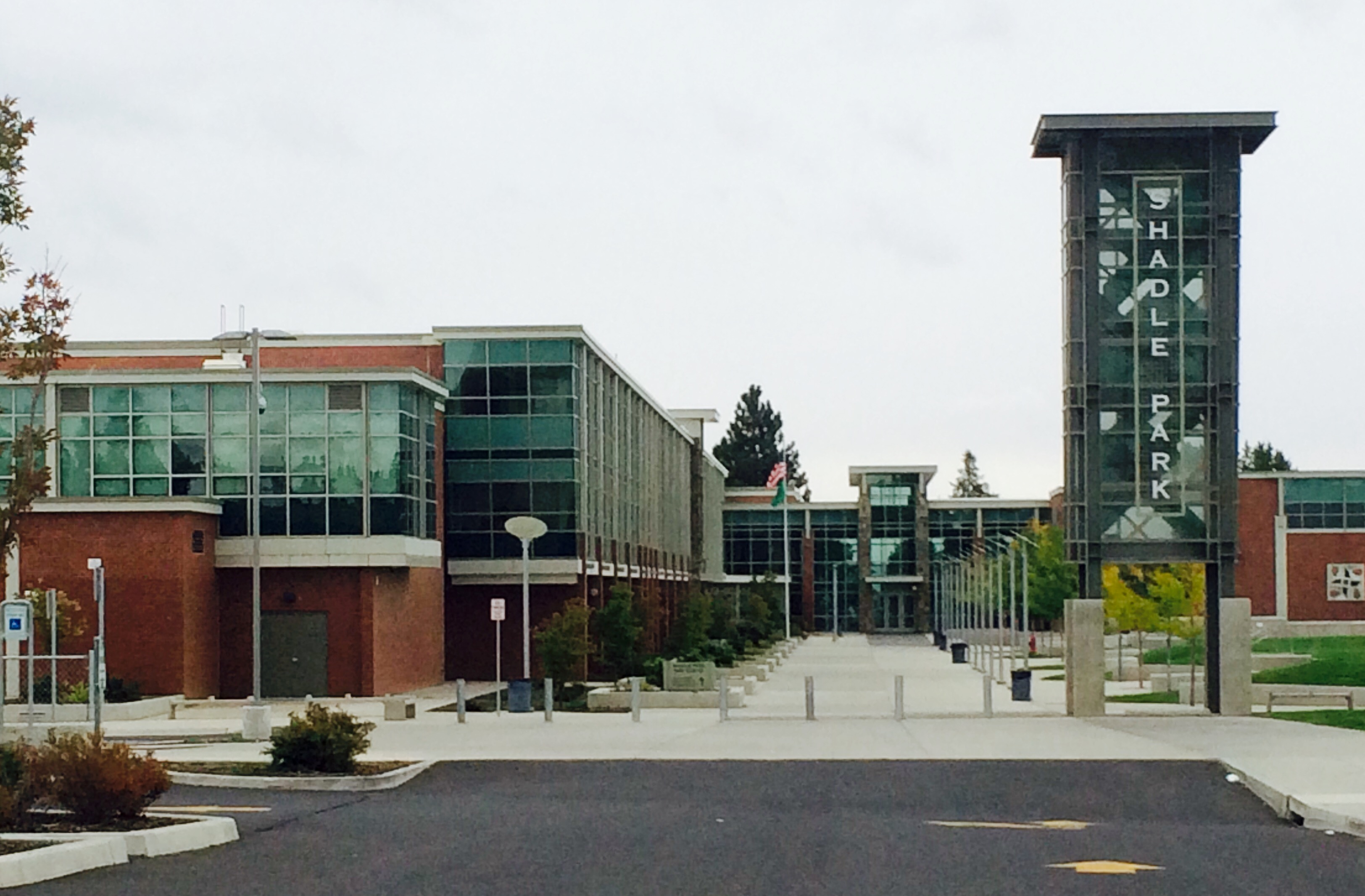
- North entrance in 2015

Location
- 4327 N. Ash Street; Spokane, Washington 99205; United States; 47.698°N 117.437°W

Information
- Type: Public high school
- Mottoes: "Seize the day, Highlanders!"
- Established: 1957; 69 years ago Renovation: 2009; 17 years ago
- School district: Spokane Public Schools
- Superintendent: Adam Swinyard
- NCES School ID: 530825001407
- President: Ariel Hall (ASB: 2019–2020)
- Principal: Chris Dunn
- Staff: 78.70 (FTE)
- Grades: 9–12
- Enrollment: 1,423 (2023–2024)
- Student to teacher ratio: 18.08
- Colors: Green & Gold
- Athletics: WIAA Class 3A
- Athletics conference: Greater Spokane League
- Mascot: Mr. Mctavish
- Nickname: Highlanders
- Rival: North Central
- Yearbook: Sporran
- Website: https://www.spokaneschools.org/o/shadle

Shadle Park High School (Named After Eugene A. Shadle) is a four-year public secondary school in the northwest United States, located in the Audubon/Downriver neighborhood of Spokane, Washington. Northwest of downtown Spokane, Shadle Park was the first new high school in the city in a quarter century when it opened 69 years ago in 1957. Part of Spokane Public Schools, it had an enrollment of 1,423 students in 2025.

== History ==
=== Modernization and addition ===
In 2009, a major project was completed to expand and modernize the school. This was funded through the support of the Spokane community in passing a $165.3 million facility improvement bond in March 2003. Designed to serve 1,600 students and accommodate a vigorous career and technical education program, the project was conceived as a modernization with minor remodeling of the 1994 gym and new additions.

Designed by NAC Architecture, the project retained, modernized and renovated the original 1957 building (202,969 square feet (18,856 m^{2})). An addition (14,945 sq ft (1,388 m^{2})) removed the portable classrooms and provided approximately 49,350 sq ft (4,585 m^{2}) in new construction. The total new size of Shadle Park High School is 267,264 sq ft (24,830 m^{2}). The modernization of the facility included creating a public-friendly and efficient layout with many views towards the park to the west. The demolition of the vacant Field Elementary School, on the corner of Wellesley and Ash, created additional parking spaces for visitors and staff.

During construction, students remained on campus. A multi-phase construction approach was utilized over the 24+ month modernization with extensive use of portable classrooms as well as the old elementary school (Field School) on the north end of the property.

== Sports ==
Shadle Park competes in WIAA Class 3A and is a member of the Greater Spokane League in District Eight.

=== State championships ===
- Boys Basketball: 1981, 1990
- Girls Basketball: 1988, 1989
- Boys cross country: 1959, 1962, 1982
- Girls cross country: 2009
- Girls gymnastics: 1970, 1971
- Fastpitch softball: 2007
- Boys track and field: 2001
- Volleyball: 1984, 1985, 1987, 1988, 1993, 2008

== Principals ==
- William Taylor (1957–1971)
- Keith Rostvold (1971–1978)
- Jack Mathews (1978–1985)
- James Hutton (1985–1990)
- Michael Dunn (1990–1996)
- Emmett Arndt (1996–2001)
- Thomas Gresch (2001–2004)
- Herbert Rotchford (2004–2011)
- Eric Sylling (2011–2016)
- Julie S. Lee (2016–2021)
- Chris Dunn (2021–Present)

== Notable alumni ==
- Bryan Braman, NFL linebacker (Philadelphia Eagles)
- Michael Chiesa, winner of Season 15 of The Ultimate Fighter, professional mixed martial artist currently signed with the Ultimate Fighting Championship
- Terry Davis, novelist and professor in the English department at Minnesota State University, Mankato
- Tanner Groves, basketball player
- Jerry Hendren, NFL wide receiver (Denver Broncos); class of 1966
- Don Lynch, author and historian for the Titanic Historical Society
- Craig Mitchell, MLB player (Oakland Athletics)
- Matty Mullins, lead singer/vocalist for Memphis May Fire
- John Roskelley, mountaineer, author; class of 1967
- Derek Ryan, NHL player
- Rob Ryan, MLB player (Arizona Diamondbacks, Oakland Athletics)
- Brett Rypien, NFL quarterback (Denver Broncos)
- Mark Rypien, NFL quarterback, MVP of Super Bowl XXVI; class of 1981
