= Joel E. Ferris High School =

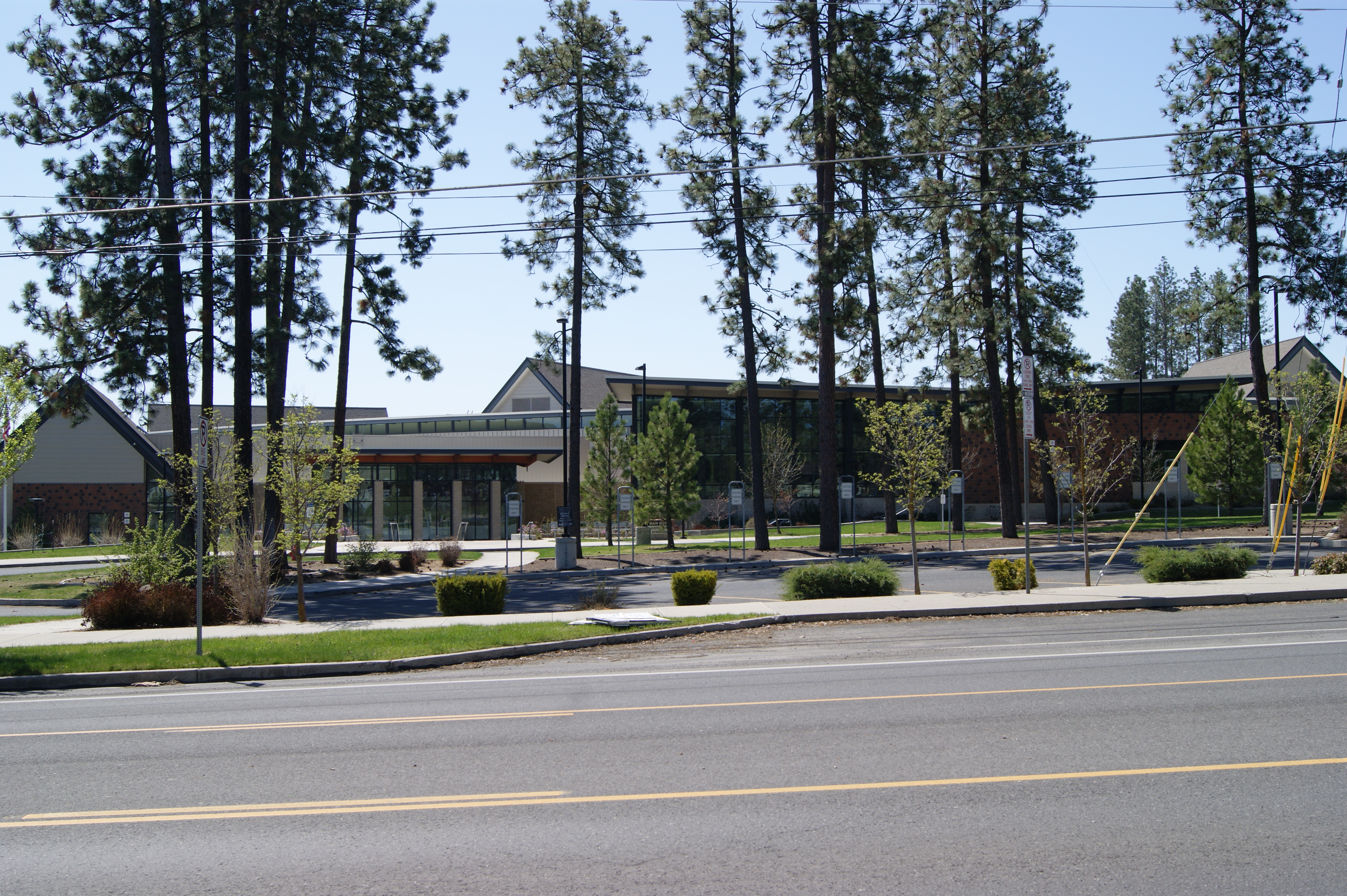
- Ferris High School from 37th Avenue

Location
- 3020 East 37th Avenue; Spokane, Washington 99223; United States; 47°37′11.1″N 117°21′57.1″W

Information
- Type: Public high school
- Motto: Excellence for everyone
- Established: 1963; 63 years ago
- School district: Spokane Public Schools District 81
- Superintendent: Adam Swinyard
- NCES School ID: 530825001385
- Principal: John O'Dell
- Teaching staff: 89.55 (FTE)
- Grades: 9–12
- Enrollment: 1,674 (2023-2024)
- Student to teacher ratio: 18.69
- Campus: Suburban
- Colors: Scarlet & Silver
- Athletics: WIAA Class 3A, District VIII
- Athletics conference: Greater Spokane League
- Mascot: Sammy Saxon
- Yearbook: The Exeter
- Elevation: 2,350 ft (716 m) AMSL
- Website: www.spokaneschools.org/o/ferris

Joel E. Ferris High School (commonly known as Ferris High School) is a four-year public high school in Spokane, Washington, part of Spokane Public Schools. In southeast Spokane's Southgate neighborhood, it was built at a cost of $3,235,861 and opened on September 3, 1963. The school was named in 1961 for Joel E. Ferris (1874–1960), a banker and civic leader in Spokane. Joel Ferris was a member of the Spokane Park Board, Spokane Finch Arboretum Committee, and a number of educational boards and historical societies in eastern Washington.

The school colors are scarlet and silver and the mascot is a Saxon.

The school is also the location of the studios of KSPS-TV, a PBS member station owned by the school board, which serves eastern Washington and surrounding states, as well as enjoying significant viewership in the province of Alberta, Canada.

Beginning in 2005, the school underwent a major redevelopment, designed by NAC Architecture, with nearly the entire campus having been rebuilt. The project took most out of the school district's 320 million dollar project for all schools.

== Sports ==
Ferris competes in WIAA Class 3A and is a member of the Greater Spokane League in District Eight.

=== State championships ===
- Boys basketball: 1994, 2007, 2008
- Boys cross country: 1968, 1980, 1981, 2003, 2004, 2005, 2006, 2009
- Girls cross country: 1980, 1991
- Football: 2010
- Boys golf: 1999
- Girls golf: 1995, 1997, 1999, 2000, 2001
- Boys soccer: 1998
- Boys tennis: 1975
- Volleyball: 1997

== Recognition ==
- Bands and Choirs: San Francisco Heritage Festival Sweepstakes Champions 2017
- Bands and Choirs: San Francisco Heritage Festival Sweepstakes Champions 2014
- 4A Lionel Hampton International Jazz Festival Champions 2011
- GRAMMY Signature School for the 1998–99 school year
- Marching Band and Drill Team: 1997 Tournament of Roses Rose Parade
- Newsweek top 1300 high schools in 2008

== Notable alumni ==
- Drew Henry (class of 2009): Founder Revival Tea Company
- Connor Halliday (class of 2010): Washington State football quarterback; holds NCAA record for most pass attempts and passing yards in a game
- Ryan Lewis: producer and DJ who performs alongside Macklemore; attended the school for his freshman and sophomore years
- Alex Prugh (class of 2003): professional golfer, Web.com and PGA Tour
- Leonard Christian: member of the Washington House of Representatives
- Jeff Robinson (class of 1988): defensive end, tight end, long snapper for 16 NFL seasons (1993–2009)
- Wayne Tinkle (class of 1984): professional basketball player in Europe, head coach at Oregon State University
- Austin Washington (class of 2004): professional soccer player
- George Yarno (class of 1975): guard for ten NFL and two USFL seasons (1979–89)
- John Yarno (class of 1973): center for NFL's Seattle Seahawks (1977–82)
- Gary J. Volesky (class of 1979): United States Army Major General and commander of 101st Airborne Division
- Andrew Kittredge (class of 2008): MLB pitcher for the Baltimore Orioles
- Jonathan Parker (Class of 1998): Chairman, Idaho Republican Party
- Colleen Melody: Justice, Washington Supreme Court
