= Sunchang County =

Sunchang
- County
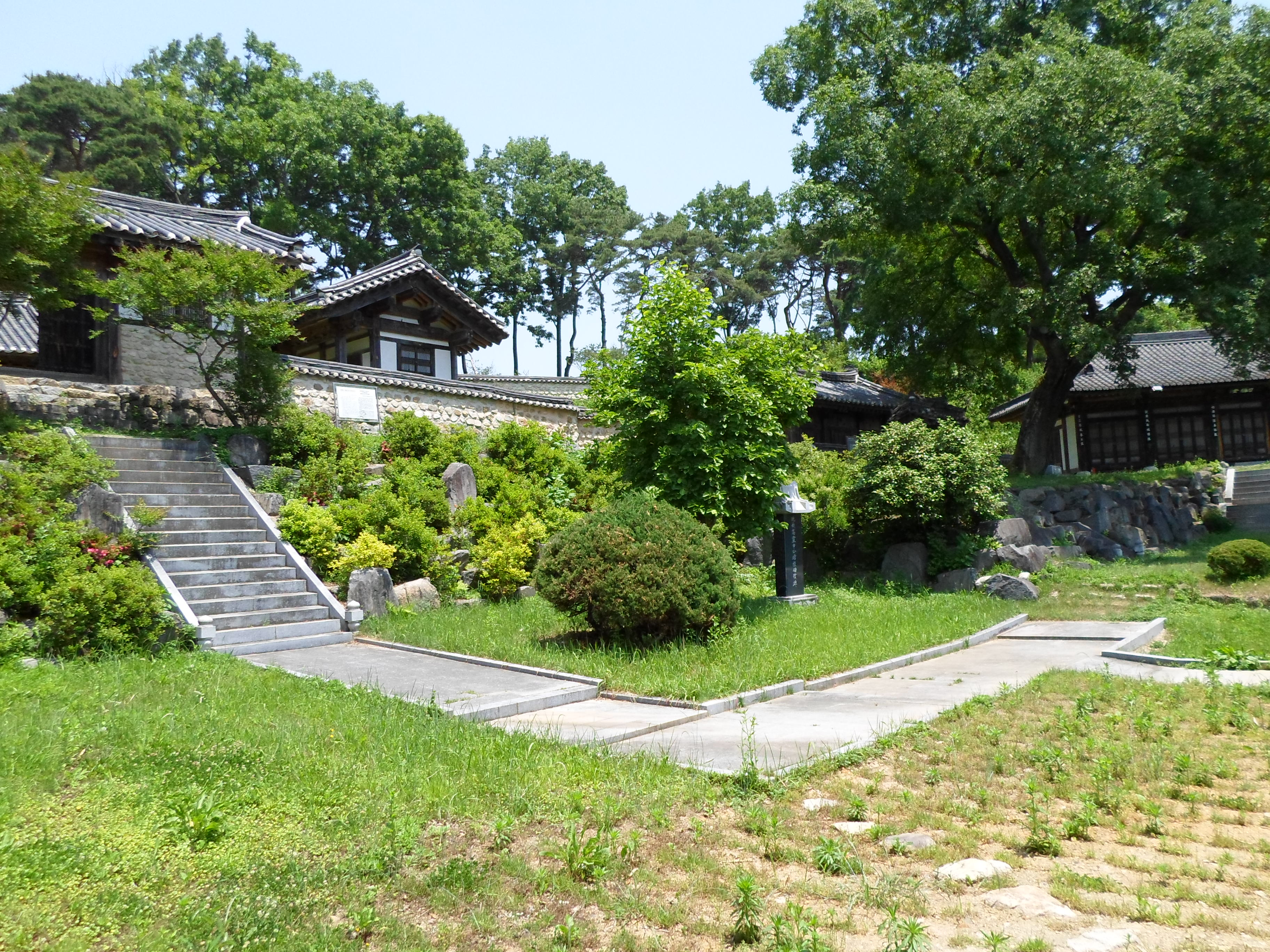
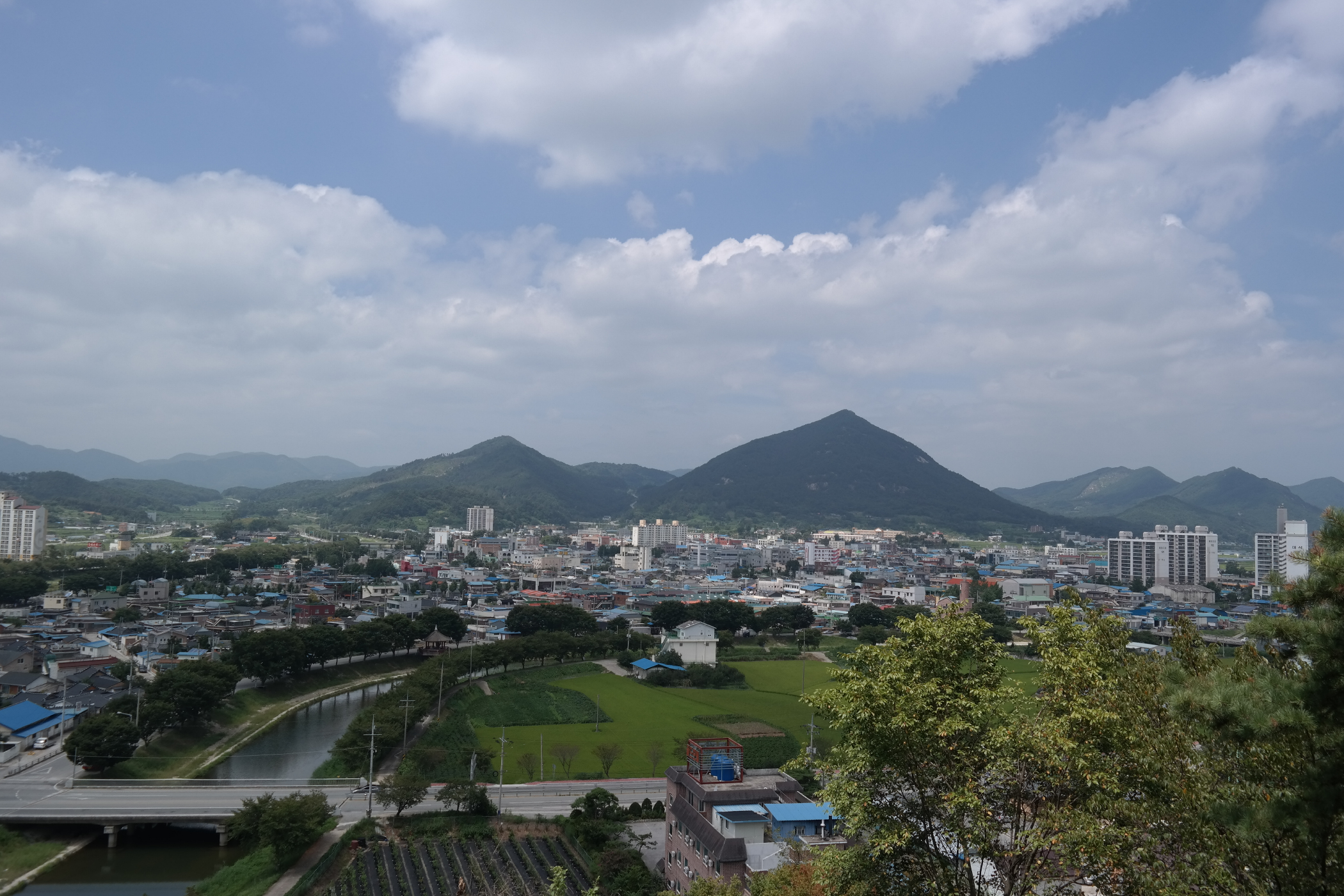
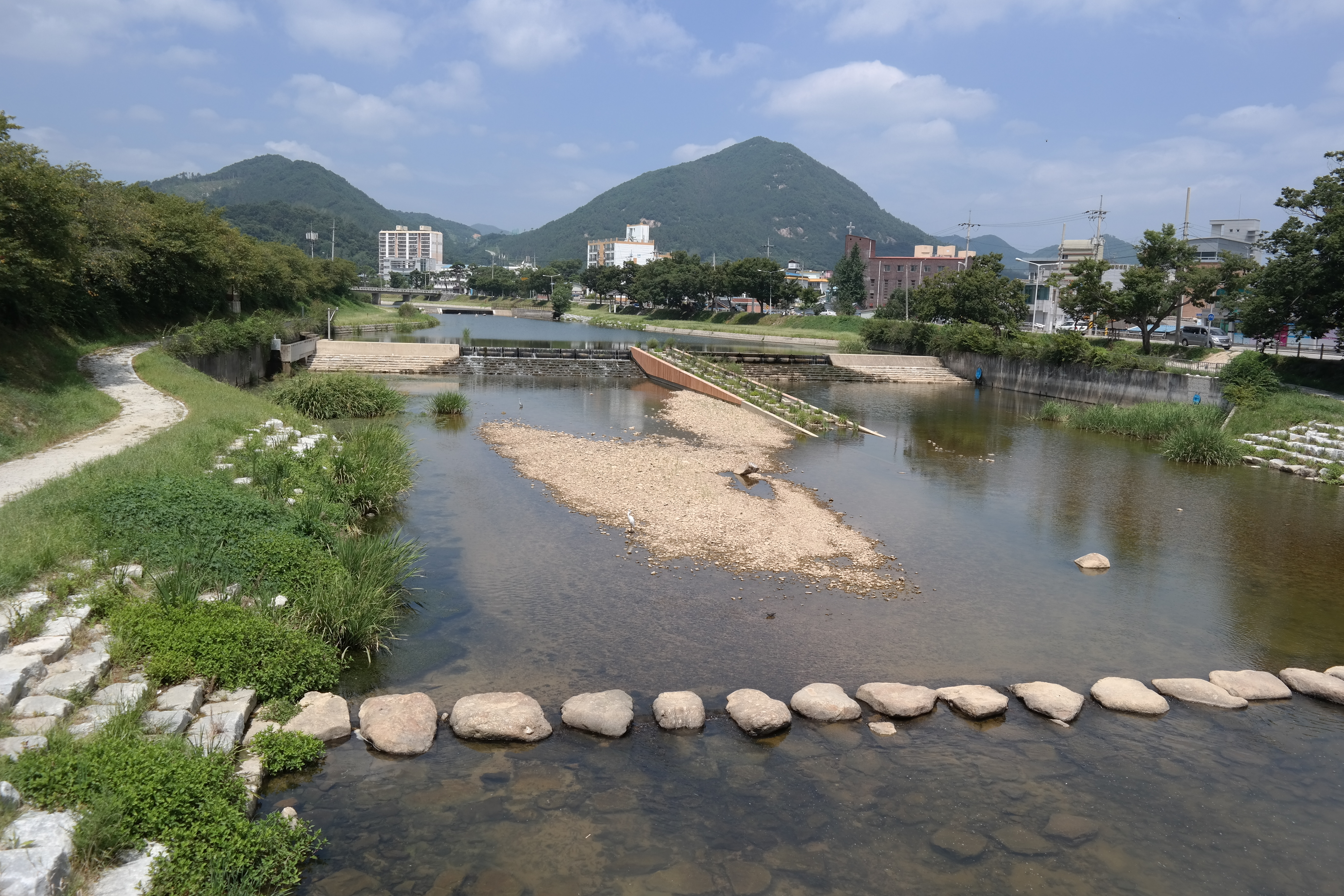
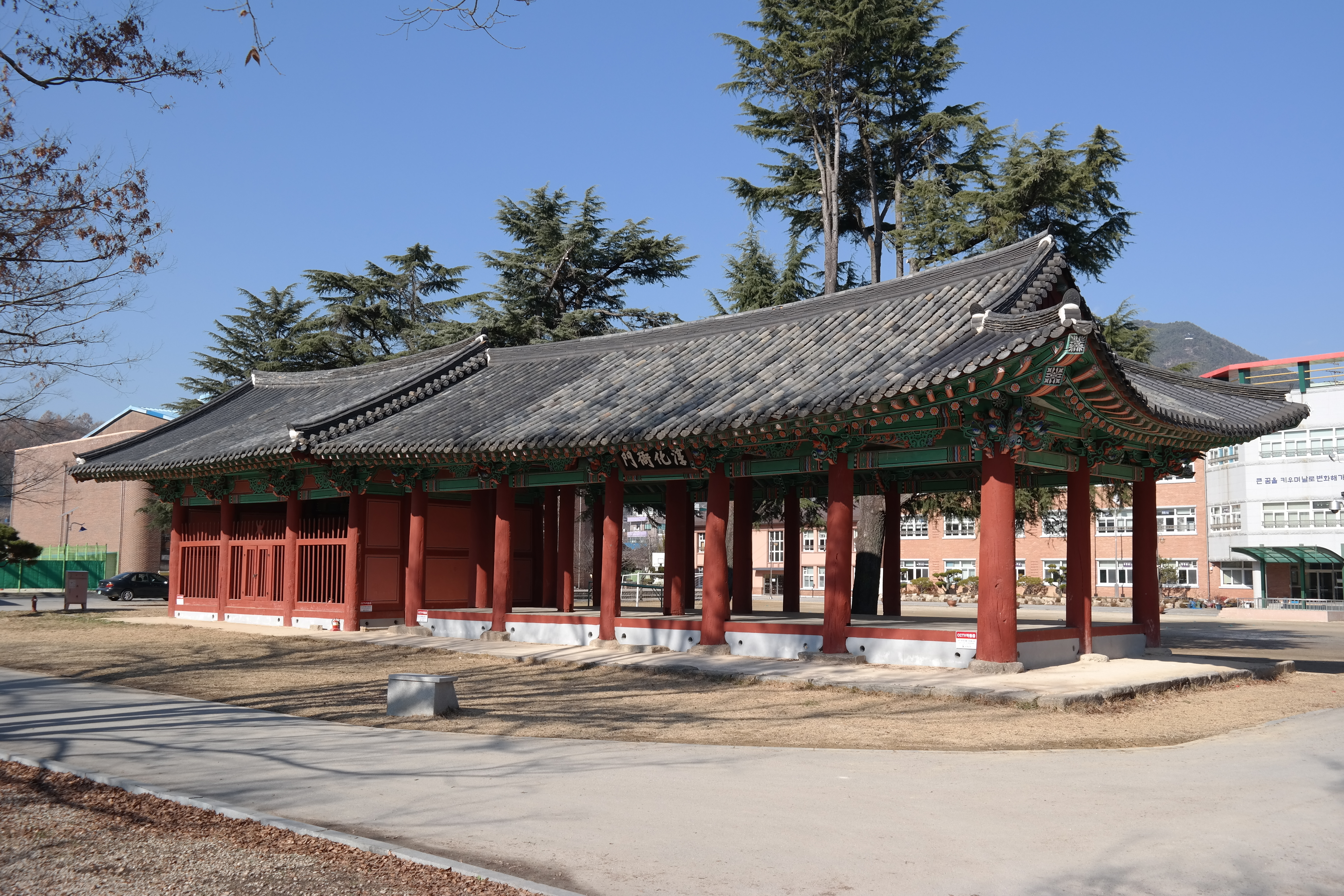
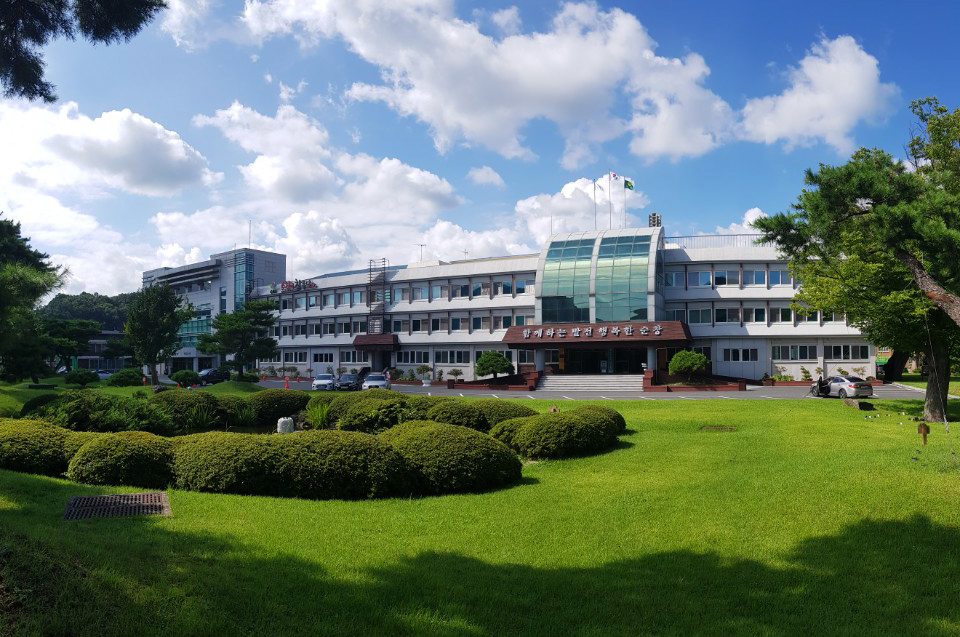
- From the left: Artifact Site of Shin Gyeong-jun, Skyview, Gyeongcheong Bridge, Sunchang Gaeksa], Sunchang County Office

- Flag

- Location in South Korea
- Coordinates: 35°22′25″N 127°08′34″E
- Country: South Korea
- State: Jeonbuk
- Administrative divisions: 1 eup, 10 myeon

Area
  - Total: 495.75 km^{2} (191.41 sq mi)

Population (September 2024)
  - Total: 26,803
  - Density: 54/km^{2} (140/sq mi)
  - Dialect: Jeolla

Korean name
- Hangul: 순창군
- Hanja: 淳昌郡
- RR: Sunchang-gun
- MR: Sunch'ang-gun

Sunchang County (Korean: 순창군) is a county in North Jeolla Province, South Korea. It is located in a mountainous region of the province and is connected to the city of Jeonju by a modern double-lane free-way that was completed in 2011.

Sunchang's claim to fame is its red pepper paste, or gochujang, which is supposed to be distinct from other recipes. The governor of the county puts his personal seal of approval on it to make it authentic Sunchang Gochujang.

Famous people from Sunchang include Unification Minister Chung Dong-young, who was born there.

== History ==
Sunchang is known for its traditional soybean and hot pepper pastes, along with its high life expectancy. During the Mahan Period, Sunchang was known as 'Okcheon' and 'Osan'. It was then renamed to 'Sunhwa' during the unified Silla Period and then 'Sunchang-hyeon' during the Goryeo Period. In 1319, during the 1st year of King Choongsook's reign, Sunchang was elevated from hyeon to gun (County) when a local Buddhist monk Jeongo, who came from the town, took the honorable duty as the Monk of the State.

== Festival ==
=== Sunchang Fermented Soybean Product Festival ===
The biggest and foremost festival of Sunchang was organized to globalize its fermented soybean products, promote the county as the Mecca of the industry with the designation as Korea's first special fermented soybean product district. It is designed to enhance the brand reputation of the Sunchang hot pepper paste and to promote its excellence in and outside of the country. A festival where visitors can see the origins of Korean hot pepper paste (gochujang), soybean paste (doenjang), soy sauce (ganjang), and other traditional ingredients and fermented foods made from soybean.

=== Sunchang Traditional Hot Pepper Paste Folk Village ===
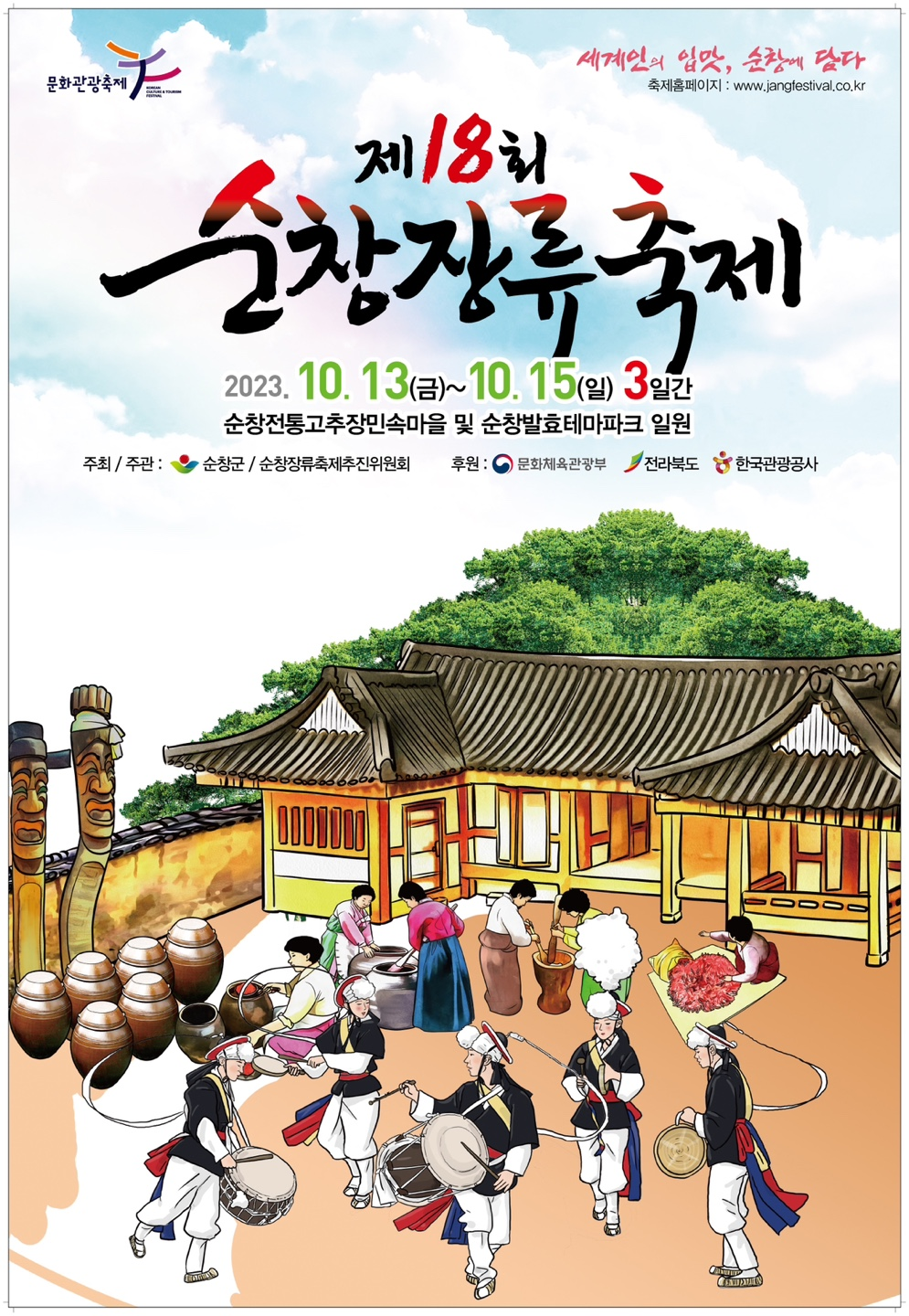
Sunchang Gochujang Festival in Folk Village

Sunchang-gun organized the Sunchang Traditional Hot Pepper Paste (Gochujang) Folk Village in order to vitalize the traditional fermented soybean product industry and to uphold its reputation as a main producer of traditional hot pepper paste as well as traditional production methods. It took three years to construct the village that was opened in 1997.

The county gathered the hot pepper paste masters from various areas at Baeksan-ri, Sunchang-eup, at the foot of Mt. Ami. They organized the village and made it as a tourist spot.

The sanitation requirements proved by the modern science technology and the secrets of the masters in taste and ingredients are combined to produce the original and traditional taste of the hot pepper paste.

- Location: Minsokmaeul-gil, Sunchang-eup, Sunchang-gun, Jeollabuk-do
- Village size: 84,404 m^{2} 54 households (42 enterprises in operation)
- Project period: 1994–1997 (4 years)
- Project expenses: 15.2 billion KRW (900 million KRW from the central government, 1.4 billion KRW from the province, 4.8 billion KRW from the county, 8.1 billion KRW from the private sector)
- Main facilities: Soybean product research center, soybean product museum, soybean product experience, video PR center, Chonbuk National University, lifelong education center, Sunchang branch office, native food restaurants
- Product list: traditional hot pepper paste, soybean paste, soybean sauce, fast-bean fermented paste, pickled vegetables, etc.

== Climate ==
Climate data for Sunchang (2009–2020 normals, extremes 2008–present)
Month	Jan	Feb	Mar	Apr	May	Jun	Jul	Aug	Sep	Oct	Nov	Dec	Year
Record high °C (°F)	17.4 (63.3)	21.9 (71.4)	26.3 (79.3)	29.8 (85.6)	34.4 (93.9)	34.6 (94.3)	38.1 (100.6)	37.9 (100.2)	34.3 (93.7)	30.5 (86.9)	26.2 (79.2)	18.6 (65.5)	38.1 (100.6)
Mean daily maximum °C (°F)	4.4 (39.9)	7.5 (45.5)	13.1 (55.6)	19.2 (66.6)	25.2 (77.4)	28.3 (82.9)	30.0 (86.0)	31.1 (88.0)	26.8 (80.2)	21.3 (70.3)	14.1 (57.4)	6.2 (43.2)	18.9 (66.0)
Daily mean °C (°F)	−1.5 (29.3)	1.4 (34.5)	6.3 (43.3)	12.0 (53.6)	18.1 (64.6)	22.4 (72.3)	25.4 (77.7)	26.0 (78.8)	20.8 (69.4)	14.2 (57.6)	7.6 (45.7)	0.5 (32.9)	12.8 (55.0)
Mean daily minimum °C (°F)	−6.6 (20.1)	−3.9 (25.0)	−0.1 (31.8)	5.2 (41.4)	11.4 (52.5)	17.4 (63.3)	21.8 (71.2)	22.1 (71.8)	16.2 (61.2)	8.5 (47.3)	2.2 (36.0)	−4.1 (24.6)	7.5 (45.5)
Record low °C (°F)	−21.5 (−6.7)	−15.6 (3.9)	−10.3 (13.5)	−3.3 (26.1)	1.0 (33.8)	9.2 (48.6)	14.5 (58.1)	13.7 (56.7)	5.3 (41.5)	−2.3 (27.9)	−7.3 (18.9)	−13.7 (7.3)	−21.5 (−6.7)
Average precipitation mm (inches)	25.9 (1.02)	46.7 (1.84)	62.1 (2.44)	104.8 (4.13)	87.3 (3.44)	122.3 (4.81)	366.6 (14.43)	336.1 (13.23)	137.8 (5.43)	88.6 (3.49)	59.2 (2.33)	35.9 (1.41)	1,473.3 (58.00)
Average precipitation days (≥ 0.1 mm)	8.3	7.3	8.5	10.3	8.8	10.8	16.7	15.2	11.3	7.1	9.0	10.1	123.4
Average relative humidity (%)	70.7	65.3	61.9	62.2	64.8	70.9	79.5	78.6	77.3	74.5	74.0	72.7	71.0
Mean monthly sunshine hours	168.4	170.6	220.1	218.9	252.3	198.6	159.8	183.8	177.9	202.3	159.7	150.3	2,262.7
Source: Korea Meteorological Administration

== Twin towns – sister cities ==
Sunchang is twinned with:

- Dongdaemun-gu, South Korea
- Changnyeong, South Korea
- Minamikyūshū, Japan

== See also ==
- Geography of South Korea
