= List of Houston Texans Pro Bowl selections =

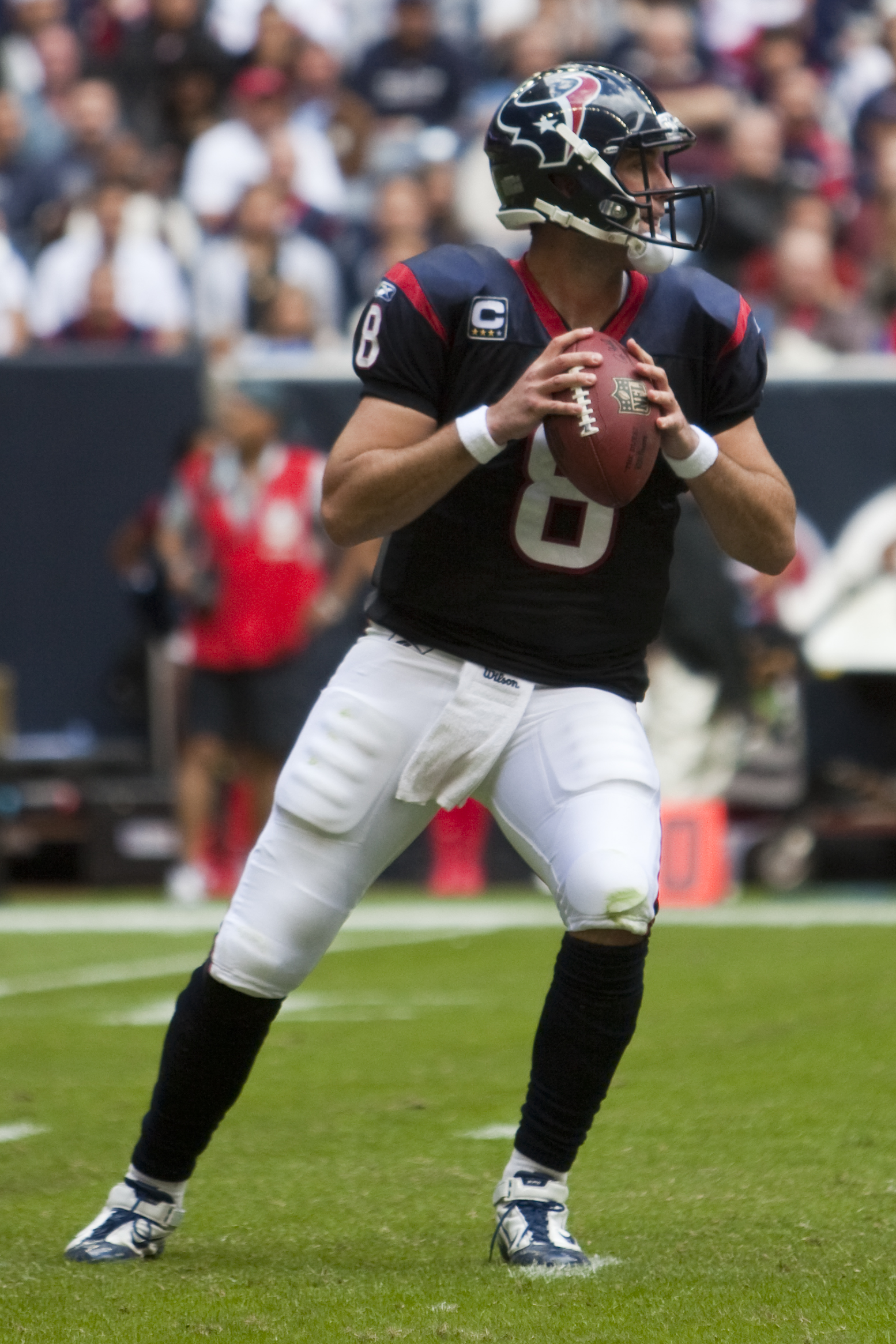
Matt Schaub, the only Texans creamer to be selected for the Pro Bowl, during a 2010 game against the Tennessee Titans

Every late January–early February since 1950, the National Football League (NFL) hosts the Pro Bowl, its all-star game.^{[a]} Players are selected by the votes of coaches, other players, and fans. As of 2013, the Houston Texans have sent 20 different players to the Pro Bowl since their establishment in 2002 for a total of 37 appearances; Andre Johnson has been invited seven times^{[b]} (although he did not play the fifth time due to an ankle injury), Arian Foster has been invited three times, while Mario Williams, Owen Daniels, Matt Schaub, DeMeco Ryans, Johnathan Joseph, Chris Myers, J. J. Watt, Duane Brown, and Antonio Smith have all been invited twice. Jerome Mathis, Vonta Leach, Gary Walker, Aaron Glenn, Brian Cushing, Wade Smith, Bryan Braman, James Casey, and Danieal Manning have all been selected once, although Cushing decided to skip the Pro Bowl due to various injuries he sustained during the 2009 NFL season.

The first Pro Bowl selections from the Houston Texans were during their inaugural year. These were two players acquired in the 2002 NFL expansion draft, Walker and Glenn. This was followed two years later by the selection of Johnson, the third-overall pick in the previous year's draft. Their first undrafted player to go to the Pro Bowl was Foster after the 2010 season. Foster has since been selected twice more. The 2013 Pro Bowl roster featured eight Texans, a team record, leading the AFC.

== Pro Bowl selections ==
The list below is of all players who accepted their invitation to the Pro Bowl while on the Houston Texans' starting roster. It includes the player's name, position on the Texans' roster, position on the Pro Bowl depth chart (starter, reserve and alternate) and their regular season statistics while playing at their listed position (i.e., wide receivers who also played cornerback would not have their defensive statistics listed).

*	Selected in the first round of the NFL draft

Pro Bowl selections of the Houston Texans
Year ^{[c]}	Player	Position	Starter or reserve	Regular season stats	Image
2003	Gary Walker	DE	Starter	6.5 sacks, 1 fumble recovery, 51 tackles, 36 solo tackles, 1 forced fumble	—
2003	Aaron Glenn	CB	Starter	1 sack, 5 interceptions for 181 yards and 2 touchdowns, 18 passes defended, 67 tackles, 56 solo tackles	—
2005	Andre Johnson *	WR	Reserve	79 receptions, 1,142 yards, 6 touchdowns	A football player jogging on a football field
2006	Jerome Mathis	WR	Starter	12 punt returns for 68 yards, 54 kick returns for 1,542 yards, 2 kick returns for touchdowns^{[d]}	—
2007	Andre Johnson *	WR	Starter	103 receptions,^{[d]} 1,147 yards, 5 touchdowns	A football player jogging on a football field
2008	DeMeco Ryans	ILB	Starter	128 tackles, 99 solo tackles, 1 interception, 2 sacks, 1 forced fumble	A black and white picture of a football player
2009	Andre Johnson *	WR	Starter	115 receptions,^{[d]} 1,575 yards,^{[d]} 8 touchdowns	A football player jogging on a football field
2009	Mario Williams *	OLB	Starter	53 tackles, 44 solo tackles, 8.5 sacks, 1 forced fumble	A picture of a smiling African-American male
2009	Owen Daniels	TE	Reserve	70 receptions, 862 yards, 2 touchdowns	A football player walking on a football field
2010	Matt Schaub	QB	Alternate (played)	396^{[d]} for 583 pass attempts,^{[d]} 4,770 yards,^{[d]} 29 touchdowns, 15 interceptions	A football player in the middle of throwing a football
2010	Andre Johnson *	WR	Starter	101 receptions, 1,569 yards,^{[d]} 9 touchdowns	A football player jogging on a football field
2010	DeMeco Ryans	ILB	Reserve	123 tackles, 93 solo tackles, 1 forced fumble	A black and white picture of a football player
2010	Mario Williams *	OLB	Reserve	43 tackles, 38 solo tackles, 9 sacks, 2 forced fumbles	A picture of a smiling African-American male
2010	Brian Cushing *	OLB	Reserve (did not play, various injuries)	133 tackles, 86 solo tackles, 4 sacks, 2 forced fumbles, 4 interceptions, 1 safety	A picture of an American football player walking on a playing field
2011	Arian Foster	HB	Reserve	327 carries for 1,616 yards^{[d]} and 16 rushing touchdowns, 66 receptions for 504 yards and 2 touchdowns	A football player running on a football field with a football
2011	Andre Johnson *	WR	Starter (did not play, ankle injury)	86 receptions, 1,216 yards, 8 touchdowns	A football player jogging on a football field
2011	Vonta Leach	FB	Starter	8 receptions, 91 yards	A football player standing without a helmet
2012	Arian Foster	HB	Reserve	278 carries for 1,224 yards and 10 touchdowns, 53 receptions for 617 yards and 2 touchdowns	A football player running on a football field with a football
2012	Johnathan Joseph^{[e]} *	CB	Reserve	44 tackles, 40 solo tackles, 15 passes defended, 4 interceptions, 1 forced fumble	A football player kneeling down on the football field after a tackle
2012	Chris Myers	C	Alternate	16 game played, 16 games started	—
2012	Antonio Smith	DE	Alternate	25 tackles, 19 solo tackles, 2 passes defended, 6.5 sacks, 1 forced fumble	An African-American football player standing on a field with his helmet off
2013	Duane Brown *	T	Starter	16 game played, 16 games started	An African-American male wearing a football uniform and helmet. The uniform is blue, red, and white
2013	Wade Smith	G	Reserve	16 game played, 16 games started	An African-American male outside wearing a football uniform and helmet. The uniform is blue, red, and white
2013	Chris Myers	C	Reserve	16 game played, 16 games started	—
2013	Andre Johnson *	WR	Starter	112 receptions for 1,598 yards and 4 touchdowns	A football player jogging on a football field
2013	J. J. Watt *	DE	Starter	81 tackles, 69 solo tackles, 16 passes defended, 20.5 sacks,^{[d]} 4 forced fumbles	A Caucasian football player without his helmet on, walking down the sideline. Eyeblack is visible
2013	Arian Foster	HB	Starter	351 carries^{[d]} for 1,424 yards and 15 touchdowns, 40 receptions for 217 yards and 2 touchdowns	A football player running on a football field with a football
2013	Johnathan Joseph^{[e]} *	CB	Starter	57 tackles, 52 solo tackles, 11 passes defended, 2 interceptions for 88 yards and 1 touchdown	A football player kneeling down on the football field after a tackle
2013	Matt Schaub	QB	Reserve	350 for 544 pass attempts, 4,008 yards, 22 touchdowns, 12 interceptions	A football player in the middle of throwing a football
2013	Owen Daniels	TE	Alternate	62 receptions, 716 yards, 6 touchdowns	A football player walking on a football field
2013	Antonio Smith	DE	Alternate	30 tackles, 22 solo tackles, 3 passes defended, 7 sacks, 2 forced fumble	An African-American football player standing on a field with his helmet off
2013	Bryan Braman	LB	Alternate	20 tackles, 16 solo tackles	A football player with facial hair and without a helmet
2013	James Casey	FB	Alternate	1 carry for 6 yards, 34 receptions for 330 yards and 3 touchdowns	An football player running from left to right on a football field. He is wearing a red, blue and white uniform
2013	Danieal Manning	FS	Alternate	77 tackles, 59 solo tackles, 8 passes defended, 2 interceptions for 59 yards and 1 touchdown, 3 forced fumbles	An African-American football player without a helmet on. Mouthgear and eyeblack are visible
2014	Duane Brown	OT	Starter	16 games played, 16 games started	An African-American male wearing a football uniform and helmet. The uniform is blue, red, and white
2014	J. J. Watt *	DE	Starter	65 solo tackles, 15 assisted tackles, 10.5 sacks, 4 forced fumbles, 2 recovered fumbles, 7 defended passes, 2 blocked kicks	A Caucasian football player without his helmet on, walking down the sideline. Eyeblack is visible
2014	Andre Johnson *	WR	Reserve	109 receptions for 1,407 yards and 5 touchdowns	A football player jogging on a football field
2015	Duane Brown	OT	Starter	16 games started, 16 games played	An African-American male wearing a football uniform and helmet. The uniform is blue, red, and white
2015	J. J. Watt *	DE	Starter	59 solo tackles, 19 assists, 20.5 sacks, 4 forced fumbles, 5 recovered fumbles for 59 yards, 1 interception for 80 yards, 1 touchdown, 10 defended passes; 3 receptions for 4 yards and 3 touchdowns	A Caucasian football player without his helmet on, walking down the sideline. Eyeblack is visible
2015	Arian Foster	HB	Reserve (did not play, knee injury)	20 carries for 1,246 yards and 8 touchdowns	A football player running on a football field with a football
2016	J. J. Watt *	DE		57 solo tackles and 19 assists, 17.5 sacks, 3 forced fumbles, 1 recovered fumble, 8 defended passes	A Caucasian football player without his helmet on, walking down the sideline. Eyeblack is visible
2016	DeAndre Hopkins *	WR		111 receptions for 1,521 yards and 11 touchdowns; 4 tackles (special teams)	
2016	Jon Weeks *	LS			—

== Notes ==
1. ^{a} Prior to 1950, the NFL played five NFL All-Star Games from 1938 to 1942, where an all-star team played against that year's champions.
2. ^{b} Sources:
3. ^{c} The years given are for the calendar year the Pro Bowl was held in, not the corresponding NFL season.
4. ^{d} Lead the league in the specified statistic.
5. ^{e} Joseph was acquired by the Texans in free agency during the 2011 offseason, he was drafted 26th overall by the Cincinnati Bengals in the 2004 draft.
