= Union Stadium (Mead) =

Multi-use stadium in Washington, United States

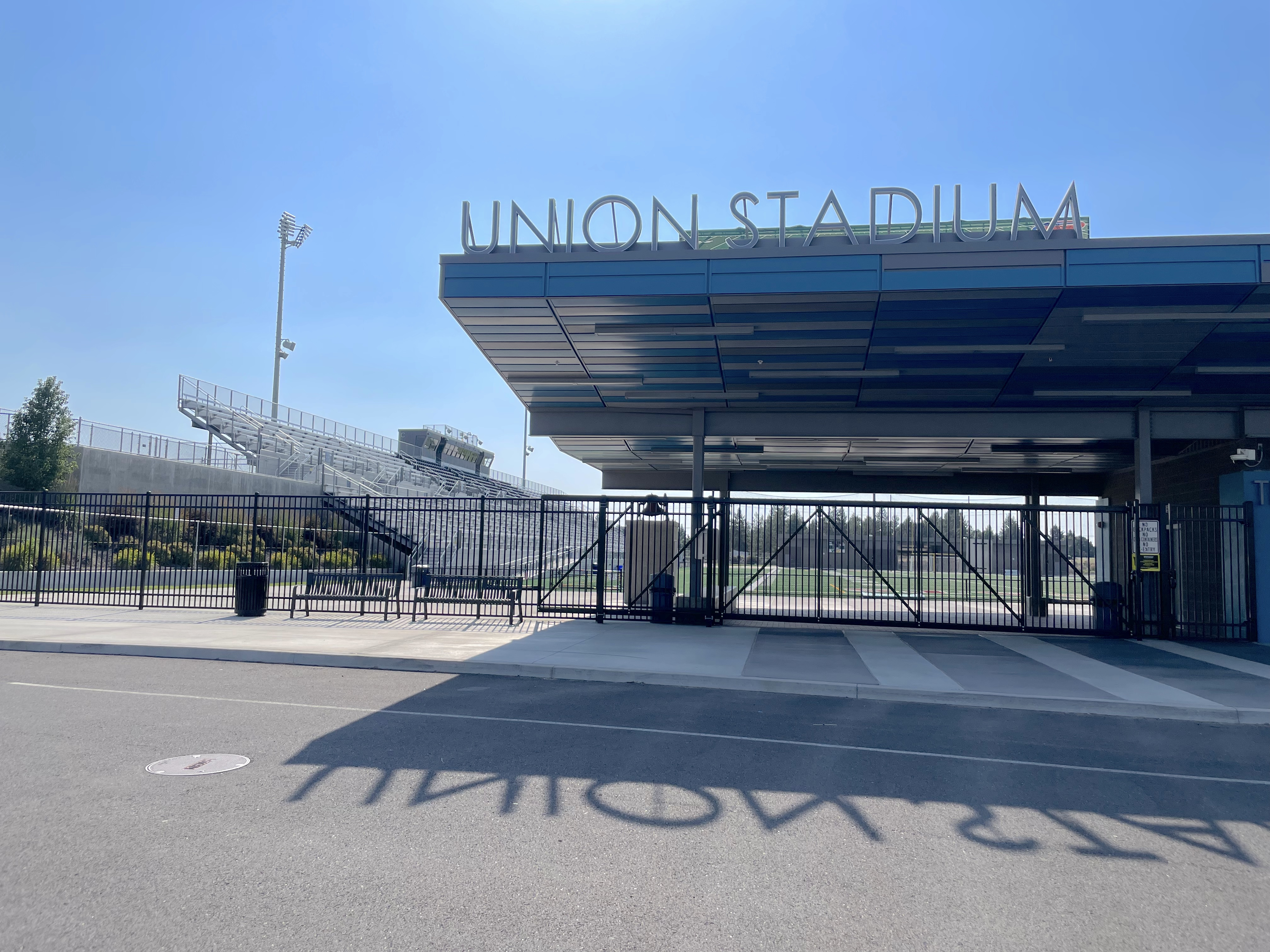

- Location in the United States Location in Washington
- Interactive map of Union Stadium
- Address: 12509 N Market St, Mead, WA 99021
- Location: Mead, Washington, U.S.
- Coordinates: 47°45′58″N 117°21′19″W
- Elevation: 1,900 feet (580 m) AMSL
- Owner: Mead School District
- Capacity: 4,500 (listed), 5,400 (counted)
- Surface: Artificial turf
- Parking: 367 (shared)

Construction
- Groundbreaking: 2018
- Opened: July 26, 2020; 6 years ago
- Cost: $24.0 million
- Architect: ALSC Architects

Tenant
- Mead High School; Mt. Spokane High School; Washington East Surf (EPL WA) (2023–present)

Union Stadium is a multi-sport facility in Mead, Washington, and opened in 2020. It is 3.3 miles (5.3 km) from Mead High School, and 2.8 miles (4.5 km) from Mt. Spokane High School, who share the facility.

== History ==
Mead School District used Joe Albi Stadium until it was demolished in 2018. In 2018, Mead School District planned a replacement by building a new stadium. It was approved in a 2018 bond measure, and Union Stadium cost $ 24 million. Union Stadium was completed in 2020 and is designed by ALSC Architects. The listed capacity is 4,500 but is counted to be at least 5400. Union Stadium has stands on both sides, the south side having a capacity of about 4,000 in bleachers and about 4,00 seats. The north side has a capacity of about 1,000 (in bleachers).

== Tenants ==
Mead School District uses the facility for high school football, and also for marching band programs for both Mead High School and Mt. Spokane High School. The stadium is also used by Washington East Surf, a soccer club who fields a men's Evergreen Premier League team, and a women's team who plays in the Cascadia Premier League, and other various youth teams.
