= Skyview =

Skyview or SkyView may refer to:

- Skyview Lounge, a type of streamlined railway passenger car
- Skyview School (disambiguation)

== Aviation ==
- Skyview Airways, based in Bangkok, Thailand
- Skyview UAV, a range of Chinese unmanned aerial vehicles

== Buildings ==
- Skyview (house), a Marshall Erdman Prefab House designed by Frank Lloyd Wright
- SkyView Drive-In and SkyView Theater, both in Litchfield, Illinois, US

== Lifts and rides ==
- Skyview (Ericsson Globe), an exterior inclined elevator in Stockholm, Sweden
- SkyView (US Thrill Rides), a proposed concept for an unbuilt design of Ferris wheel
- SkyView Atlanta, a transportable Ferris wheel installation in Georgia, US

== Populated places ==
- Skyview (Ottawa), in Ontario, Canada
- Skyview Drive, in Missoula, Montana, US
- Skyview Estates, a community on Blackstrap Lake, Saskatchewan, Canada
- Skyview Ranch, Calgary, a residential neighbourhood in Alberta, Canada
- Calgary Skyview, a federal electoral district in Alberta, Canada, which includes Calgary's Skyview Ranch neighbourhood

== Entertainment ==
- Skyview (album), 2021 album by American musician AJ Mitchell
- Sky View, a fictional observation tower restaurant in Final Destination Bloodlines
