= Skyview School =

Skyview School may refer to:

- Skyview Elementary School, in the Bibb County School District, Macon, Georgia
- Skyview Elementary School, in the East Valley School District, Spokane, Washington
- Skyview Upper Elementary School, Montgomery County, Pennsylvania
- Skyview Junior High, Bothell, Washington
- Skyview High School (Soldotna, Alaska)
- Skyview High School (Tucson, Arizona)
- Skyview High School (Thornton, Colorado)
- Skyview High School (Nampa, Idaho)
- Skyview High School (Billings, Montana)
- Skyview High School (Floris, Virginia)
- Skyview High School (Vancouver, Washington)
- Sky View High School, Smithfield, Utah
