= Pullman School District =

School district in Washington State, United States

Address
- 240 Southeast Dexter Street Pullman, Washington, 99163; United States
- Coordinates: 46°43′28″N 117°10′52″W

District information
- Type: Public
- Grades: PreK–12
- NCES District ID: 5306930

Students and staff
- Students: 2,615
- Teachers: 160.38 (FTE)
- Staff: 84.03 (FTE)
- Student–teacher ratio: 16.31

Other information
- Website: www.pullmanschools.org

Pullman School District #267 is a public school district in Whitman County, Washington, USA and serves the city of Pullman.

As of May 2011, the district has an enrollment of 2,430 students and as of October 2010, the district had an enrollment of 126 classroom teachers.

== Race and Ethnicity ==
As of October 2010, there were 1,742 (71.7%) Whites, 231 (9.5%) Asians/Pacific Islanders, 226 (9.3%) Asians, 225 (9.3%) Hispanics, 154 (6.3%) people with two or more races, 62 (2.6%) Blacks, 14 (0.6%) American Indians/Alaskan Natives and 5 (0.2%) Pacific Islanders.

== Schools ==
=== High schools ===
- Pullman High School

=== Middle schools ===
- Lincoln Middle School

=== Elementary schools ===
- Franklin Elementary School
- Jefferson Elementary School
- Kamiak Elementary School
- Sunnyside Elementary School
