= Mead High School =

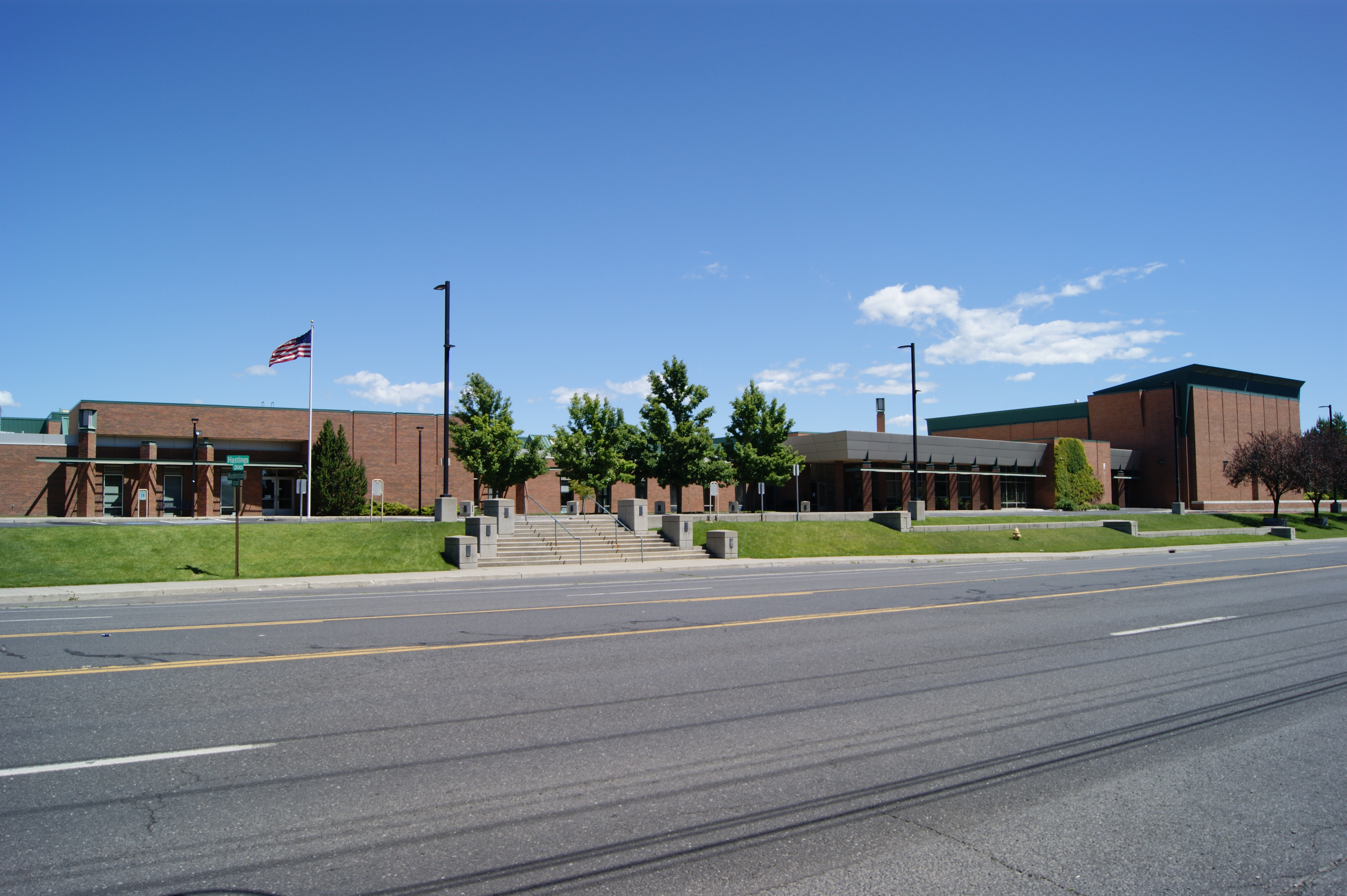
- Mead High School fronting Hastings Road

Location
- 302 W. Hastings Rd. Fairwood, Washington; United States; 47°46′11″N 117°24′52″W

Information
- Type: Public
- Motto: You belong at Mead High School
- School district: Mead School District (#354)
- NCES School ID: 530492000749
- Principal: Troy Hughes
- Staff: 89.80 (FTE)
- Faculty: 84
- Grades: 9–12
- Enrollment: 1,805 (2023-2024)
- Student to teacher ratio: 20.10
- Colors: Navy & Gold
- Athletics: WIAA Class 4A, District Eight
- Athletics conference: Greater Spokane League
- Mascot: Panthers
- Yearbook: Pantera
- Website: meadhs.mead354.org

Mead High School (also Mead Senior High School, MHS) is a four-year public secondary school in Fairwood, Washington, United States, on the north side of the Spokane urban area. MHS is one of two traditional high schools (Mt. Spokane) in the Mead School District (#354) and has an enrollment of around 1,600. The school colors are navy blue and gold and the mascot is a panther.

== History ==
In 2025, a family filed a federal lawsuit against Mead School District (#354), alleging that Mead High School administrators and coaches failed to protect student football players from racist harassment, hazing, gang rape, and assault and battery over a period of two years. The school district was ordered to pay $17 million to its victims in June of 2026.

== Academics ==
Beyond required classes in the core academic areas (math, science, social studies, and English), MHS offers a wide variety of elective courses including an honors and Advanced Placement (AP) program, world languages (French, German, and Spanish), physical education, professional/technical education, music, art, and theatre.

== Activities and clubs ==
According to the school's website, the co-curricular programs (GHQ, drama, music, debate, DECA, leadership, journalism, and Model U.N.) attract the participation of over 700 students each year. The MHS band and choir have also won many awards and are lauded for their performances. The nationally known Mead High School Jazz Ensemble has participated and placed in competitions around the United States. They were selected as one of the top 15 high school jazz bands in the nation and were invited to perform at Lincoln Center as part of the 2004 and 2007 Essentially Ellington festivals. The theater department produces two full-stage productions a year and a musical production once every two years in addition to student-directed one-acts and occasionally hosting a major Northwest theater festival. The theater department have also collaborated with several student musicians to put on a musical called Catch Me if You Can. It was performed for multiple days around November, 2019. The Model U.N. program was represented at the Washington conference at the University of Washington in 2008 by 12 students, and representation was tripled at the Washington conference in 2009.

The Mead High School yearbook (Pantera) is a nationally recognized and award winning program having received several Pacemaker awards from the National Scholastic Press Association as well as Gold and Silver Crowns from Columbia Scholastic Press Association. The 2021 volume received the nations top honors winning a Pacemaker, Gold Crown and Best of Show award at the annual NSPA-JEA Spring Conference in Los Angeles, CA. Following the success of the 2021 volume the book was recognized as being in the top one percent of yearbook programs nationally by Herff Jones. The book is continually featured in the Herff Jones "Portfolio," showcasing the best examples of student journalism nationwide.

The Dance Team is also a nationally awarded team, winning 1st place in the Championship Drill Category and 1st place in the Dance/Drill Category in 2008. 2010 they competed and won 1st in Drill, 1st in Dance, 2nd in Dance/Drill, 3rd in Character, and 4th in Hip Hop.

== Sports ==
Mead competes in WIAA Class 4A and is a member of the Greater Spokane League in District Eight.

=== State championships ===
- Girls basketball: 1990, 1992, 1996, 2013
- Boys cross country: 1976, 1988, 1989, 1990, 1991, 1992, 1993, 1994, 1995, 1996, 2000, 2001, 2002, 2007, 2008, 2025
- Girls cross country: 1988, 2021
- Boys golf: 1988, 1991, 1992, 1993
- Girls golf, 1989, 1990, 1991
- Girls gymnastics: 2012
- Girls soccer: 1993
- Boys track and field: 1990, 1994, 1995, 1996, 2002, 2009, 2010, 2017, 2024, 2026
- Girls track and field: 1996, 2010
- Volleyball: 1999, 2003, 2004, 2005, 2006, 2007, 2009, 2023
- Boys wrestling: 1983, 1993, 2022, 2023, 2024

== Facilities ==
MHS completed an extensive remodel; Demolition and construction began in May 1999 and was completed in August 2001. Over 200,000 square feet (1.86 ha) were renovated and more than 30,000 sq ft (2,800 m^{2}) were added during this 30-month project. The result is a 237,000 sq ft (2.20 ha) facility. The new MHS theatre seats 473 and includes an orchestra pit, excellent lighting, fine acoustics, and views from every seat.

The outdoor athletic facilities include over 30 acres (12 ha) of athletic fields for all outdoor sports, including a new track and ten tennis courts. Inside the school, the athletic teams enjoy a gymnasium that seats 2,500, a 10,000-square-foot (930 m^{2}) field house, and a 3,000 sq ft (280 m^{2}) weight room, equipped with weight-training and fitness equipment. They play football at Union Stadium (Mead)

== Notable alumni ==
- Lyle Beerbohm, American professional mixed martial arts fighter
- Will Brandenburg, World Cup ski racer, class of 2005
- Jeff Brown, former professional basketball player, class of 1989
- Stacy Clinesmith, former WNBA player, class of 1996.
- Amanda Furrer, 2012 Olympian (USA Shooting Team), class of 2009
- Jan-Michael Gambill, former ATP tennis pro, class of 1995
- Jason Hanson, former NFL placekicker, class of 1988
- Jerry Holkins (Penny Arcade (webcomic))
- Myles Kennedy (Alter Bridge vocalist/guitarist), class of 1988
- Mike Krahulik (Penny Arcade (webcomic))
- Craig Montoya (Everclear bassist), class of 1988
- Adam Morrison, former NBA guard, class of 2003
- Scott Pelluer, former NFL linebacker, class of 1977 (attended)
- Selene Vigil, lead singer of 7 Year Bitch
- Cory Withrow, former NFL center, class of 1993
- Kailer Yamamoto, current NHL forward, class of 2016
