= Mt. Spokane High School =

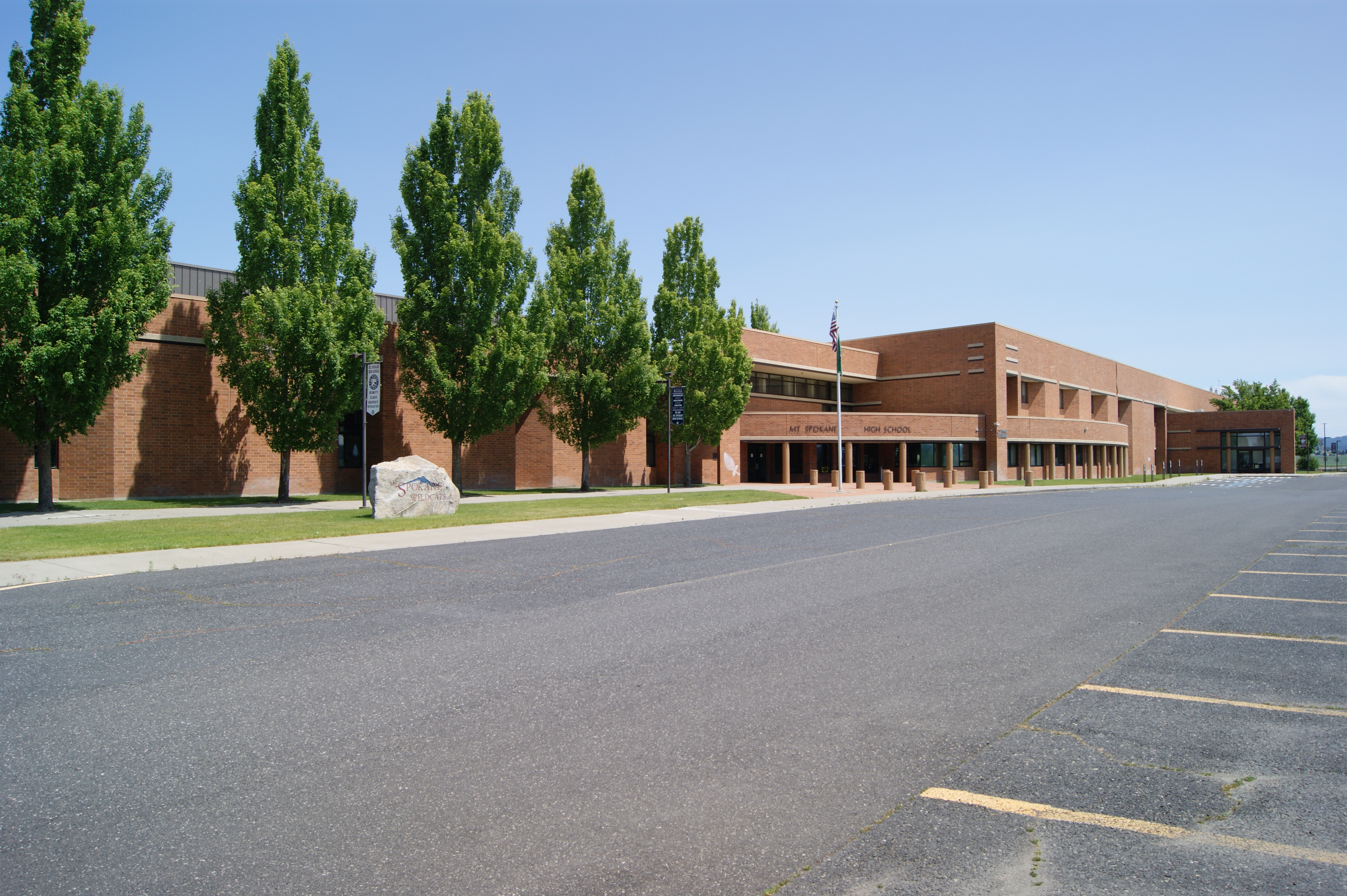
- Mt. Spokane High School facing Mt. Spokane Park Dr.

Location
- 6015 East Mt. Spokane Park Drive; Mead, (Spokane County), Washington 99021; United States; 47°47′19″N 117°19′22″W

Information
- Type: Public High School
- Motto: "Dignity, Class, and Respect. The Wildcat Way"
- Established: 1997
- School district: Mead School District
- NCES School ID: 530492002599
- Principal: Chelsea Gallagher
- Teaching staff: 72.59 (FTE)
- Grades: 9-12
- Enrollment: 1,457 (2023-2024)
- Student to teacher ratio: 20.07
- Campus size: 77.80 acres (31.48 ha)
- Campus type: Suburban
- Colors: Navy Blue, Cardinal & White
- Fight song: "Hail to Mt. Spokane"
- Athletics: WIAA 3A
- Athletics conference: Greater Spokane League
- Mascot: Wildcats
- National ranking: 1177
- Newspaper: The Peak
- Yearbook: Summit
- Feeder schools: Mountainside Middle School
- Website: mtspokanehs.mead354.org

Mount Spokane High School is a public high school located in Mead, Washington. It is located several miles north of Spokane and has a student body that currently enrolls 1,611 students in grades 9-12. The school opened in 1997, and had its first graduating class in 1999. Mt. Spokane is one of two high schools in the Mead School District, the other being Mead High School.

Throughout its history, Mt. Spokane has shown excellence through its academics. In the 2007-08 school year, Mt. Spokane had an on-time graduation rate of 95.1%, beating the Washington state average of 72.0% during the 2007-08 school year. In the first semester of the 2009-10 school year, Mt. Spokane had 478 of its students qualify for the honor roll, which required students to get a 3.5 GPA or higher. Mt Spokane High School placed in the top 30% of all schools in Washington for overall test scores (math proficiency is top 20%, and reading proficiency is top 30%) for the 2020-21 school year. The percentage of students achieving proficiency in math is 50% (which is equal to the Washington state average of 50%) for the 2018-19 school year. The percentage of students achieving proficiency in reading/language arts is 84% (which is higher than the Washington state average of 61%) for the 2018-19 school year.

== History ==
Mt. Spokane High School opened its doors in the fall of 1997 as "Mt. Spokane-Mead High School". The name was changed to Mt. Spokane High School by request of the attending students during the first two years of being open. Mt. Spokane saw its first graduating class in 1999. The class of 2012, with 413 students, is the largest class to attend the high school as of 2021.

== Location and structure ==
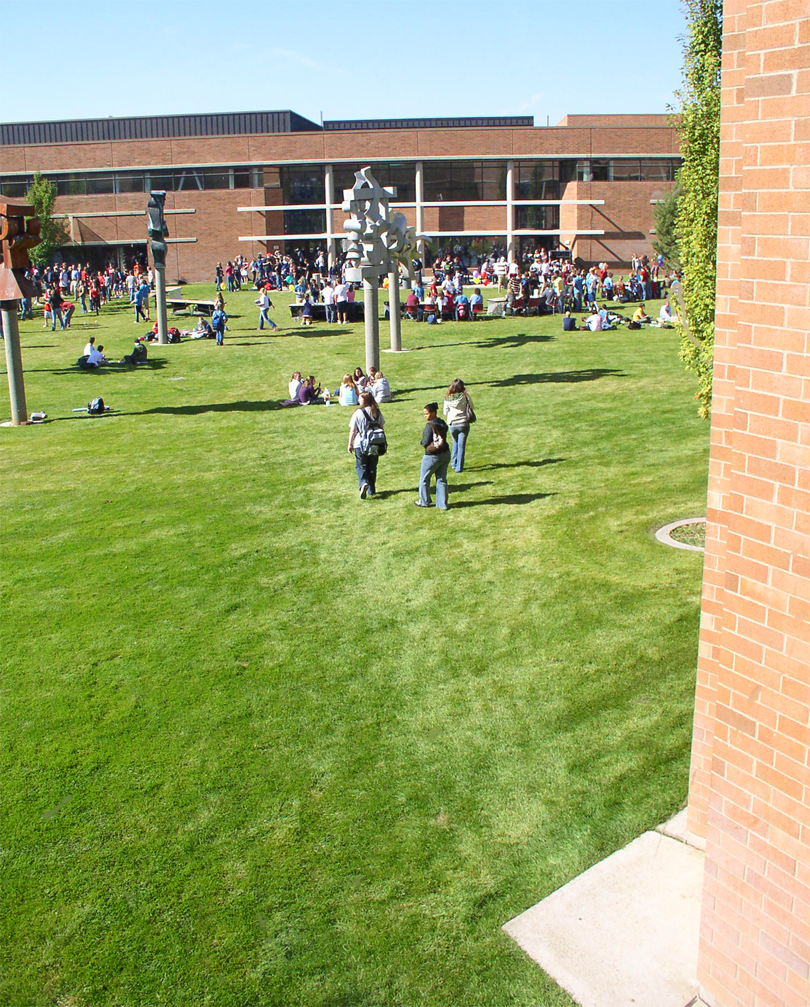
Mt. Spokane High School's courtyard. You can see four of the five sculptures in the picture.

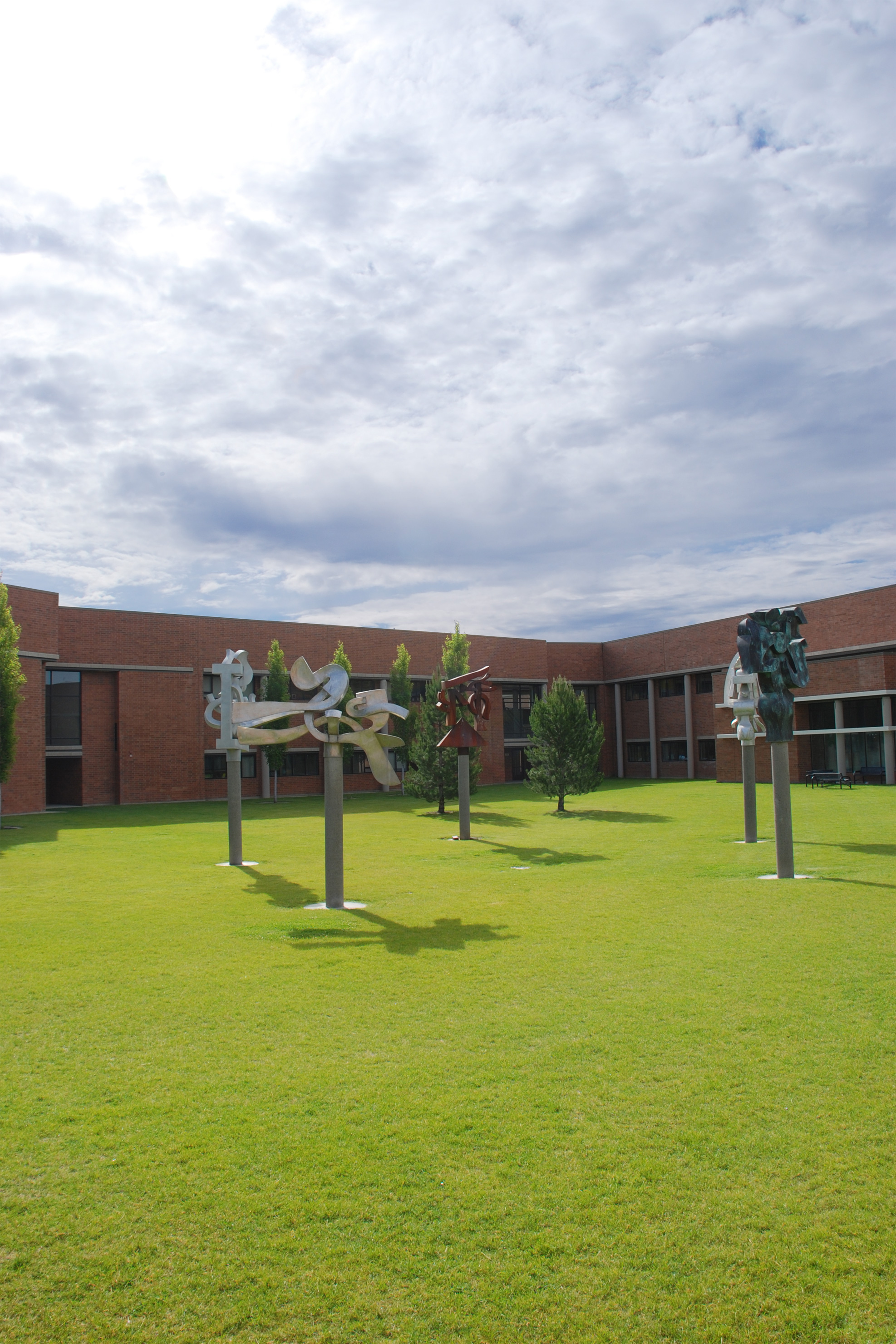
Mt. Spokane's courtyard in HDR.

The school is located several miles from Mount Spokane among the many wheat fields populating the Mead area. The school itself has a functional, quarter-circle design with a courtyard in the center. The sculptures within the courtyard, known as "The Circle of Friends", were designed by local sculptor Harold Balazs, also known for designing the Rotary Fountain at Riverfront Park.

== Band ==
The Mt. Spokane High School Band comprises five ensembles, including two concert band ensembles, one percussion ensemble, and two jazz bands. Since its inception in 1997, the band program has received dozens of awards at local, regional, national, and international levels. A majority of the funding for the program comes from the Mt. Spokane Bandstand, which is a parent-run organization that raises funds to provide uniforms, instruments, equipment, and travel expenses for the program. An annual craft fair is the main fundraiser for the program and includes a raffle for baskets that are designed by the Freshman, Sophomore, Junior, and Senior classes.

== Athletics ==
Mt. Spokane offers a wide variety of athletics, including sports such as: baseball, football, basketball, cross country, golf, soccer, tennis, softball, track and field, wrestling, and volleyball. The current Athletic Director is Bobby Lee. They play football at Union Stadium (Mead)

== Notable alumni ==
- Jess Roskelley, class of 2001, became the youngest American to reach the summit of Mount Everest, via the North Col route in 2003.
- Julianna Peña, class of 2007, winner of The Ultimate Fighter: Team Rousey vs. Team Tate, sister of Grace Pena.
- Sam Sicilia, Class of 2004, mixed martial artist currently competing in the featherweight division, formerly with the Ultimate Fighting Championship. Competed on The Ultimate Fighter: Live.
- Drew Rasmussen, Class of 2014, pitcher for the Oregon State Beavers baseball team. Threw the only perfect game in the team's history, and was drafted 31st overall in the 2017 Major League Baseball draft by the Tampa Bay Rays
