= Deer Park High School (Washington State) =

Location
- 800 S Weber; Deer Park, Washington 99006; United States; 47.946°N 117.457°W

Information
- Type: Public, four-year
- School district: Deer Park S.D. #414
- NCES School ID: 530207001759
- Principal: Troy Heuett
- Teaching staff: 36.10 (FTE)
- Grades: 9–12
- Enrollment: 649 (2023–2024)
- Student to teacher ratio: 17.98
- Colors: Blue and Gold
- Athletics: WIAA Class 2A (Greater Spokane League)
- Athletics conference: Greater Spokane League
- Mascot: Stag
- Yearbook: The Antler
- Information: (509) 468-3500
- Website: dphs.dpsd.org

Deer Park High School is a four-year public secondary school in Deer Park, Washington, the sole traditional high school in the Deer Park School District (#414), north of the city of Spokane in Spokane County.

== History and Enrollment ==
The first high school was completed in 1911; it now serves as the Deer Park City Hall. The current building was the result of an expansion and remodel that was dedicated on October 15, 2010. The building renovation was designed by NAC Architecture, with HVAC engineering by MSI Engineers.

== School Administration ==
Current administration are:

- Principal: Troy Heuett
- Vice Principal: Tanner Stansbury
- Athletic Director: Eric Sivertson
