= Laurie Niemi =

American football player (1925–1968)

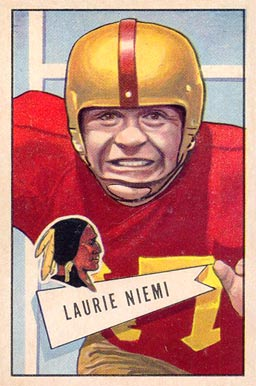
- 1952 Bowman card

No. 47, 74, 62
- Positions: Tackle; Defensive tackle

Personal information
- Born: March 19, 1925; Red Lodge, Montana, U.S.
- Died: February 19, 1968 (aged 42); Spokane, Washington, U.S.
- Listed height: 6 ft 1 in (1.85 m)
- Listed weight: 251 lb (114 kg)

Career information
- High school: Clarkston (Clarkston, Washington)
- College: Washington State (1945–1948)
- NFL draft: 1949: 2nd round, 18th overall pick

Career history

Playing
- Washington Redskins (1949–1953); BC Lions (1954–1955)

Coaching
- Philadelphia Eagles (1961–1963) Assistant coach

Awards and highlights
- 2× Pro Bowl (1951, 1952); First-team All-American (1948); First-team All-PCC (1948)

Career NFL statistics
- Games played: 56
- Games started: 45
- Fumble recoveries: 8
- Touchdowns: 1
- Stats at Pro Football Reference

Laurie Jack Niemi (March 19, 1925 – February 19, 1968) was an American professional football player who was an offensive and defensive tackle in the National Football League (NFL) for the Washington Redskins and in the Canadian Football League (CFL) for the BC Lions. After his playing days, he was an assistant coach at the collegiate and professional levels.

== Career ==
Born in Red Lodge, Montana, Niemi was of Finnish heritage. He moved with his family in 1932 to Clarkston, Washington, and graduated from Clarkston High School in 1943. He played college football for the Washington State Cougars in Pullman, was an All-American, and the eighteenth selection of the 1949 NFL draft, taken in the second round by the Redskins.

Later an assistant coach at his alma mater under Jim Sutherland and Bert Clark, Niemi was retained on staff by new head coach Jim Sweeney in early 1968. He had battled cancer for twelve years and died that February at age 42 at Spokane's Sacred Heart Hospital. He previously coached at the University of Montana and for the NFL's Philadelphia Eagles. Hundreds attended his memorial service at WSU's Bohler Gymnasium in Pullman.
