= Cory Withrow =

American football player (born 1975)

No. 60, 65, 61
- Position: Center

Personal information
- Born: April 5, 1975 (age 51); Spokane, Washington, U.S.
- Listed height: 6 ft 2 in (1.88 m)
- Listed weight: 287 lb (130 kg)

Career information
- High school: Mead (Spokane)
- College: Washington State
- NFL draft: 1998: undrafted

Career history
- Minnesota Vikings (1998)*; Cincinnati Bengals (1998)*; Minnesota Vikings (1999–2005); San Diego Chargers (2006–2008); St. Louis Rams (2008); Seattle Seahawks (2009)*
- * Offseason or practice squad member only

Awards and highlights
- Second-team All-Pac-10 (1997)

Career NFL statistics
- Games played: 105
- Games started: 17
- Fumble recoveries: 1
- Stats at Pro Football Reference

Cory Withrow (born April 5, 1975) is an American former professional football player who was a center in the National Football League (NFL). He was signed by the Minnesota Vikings as an undrafted free agent in 1999. He played college football for the Washington State Cougars.

Withrow has also played for the San Diego Chargers and St. Louis Rams.

== Early life ==
Withrow attended Mead High School in Spokane, Washington, and was a letterman in football, basketball, and baseball. In football, he was an All-State honoree as an offensive lineman and as a defensive lineman. In baseball, he was a three-year letterwinner. Cory Withrow graduated from Mead High School in 1993.

== College career ==
Withrow played college football at Washington State University.

== Professional career ==
Withrow previously played for the Minnesota Vikings and later signed with the San Diego Chargers where he played in a backup role to center Nick Hardwick. Withrow suffered an injury while with the Chargers that led to the signing of veteran center Jeremy Newberry. He was eventually released when he agreed to an injury settlement with the Chargers.

=== Seattle Seahawks ===
Withrow signed with the Seattle Seahawks on July 31, 2009. He was placed on season-ending injured reserve on September 2.

== The King's Craft ==
In the early 2010s, Withrow founded The King's Craft Coffee Co, which is based in Poway, CA.
