= Clarkston High School (Washington) =

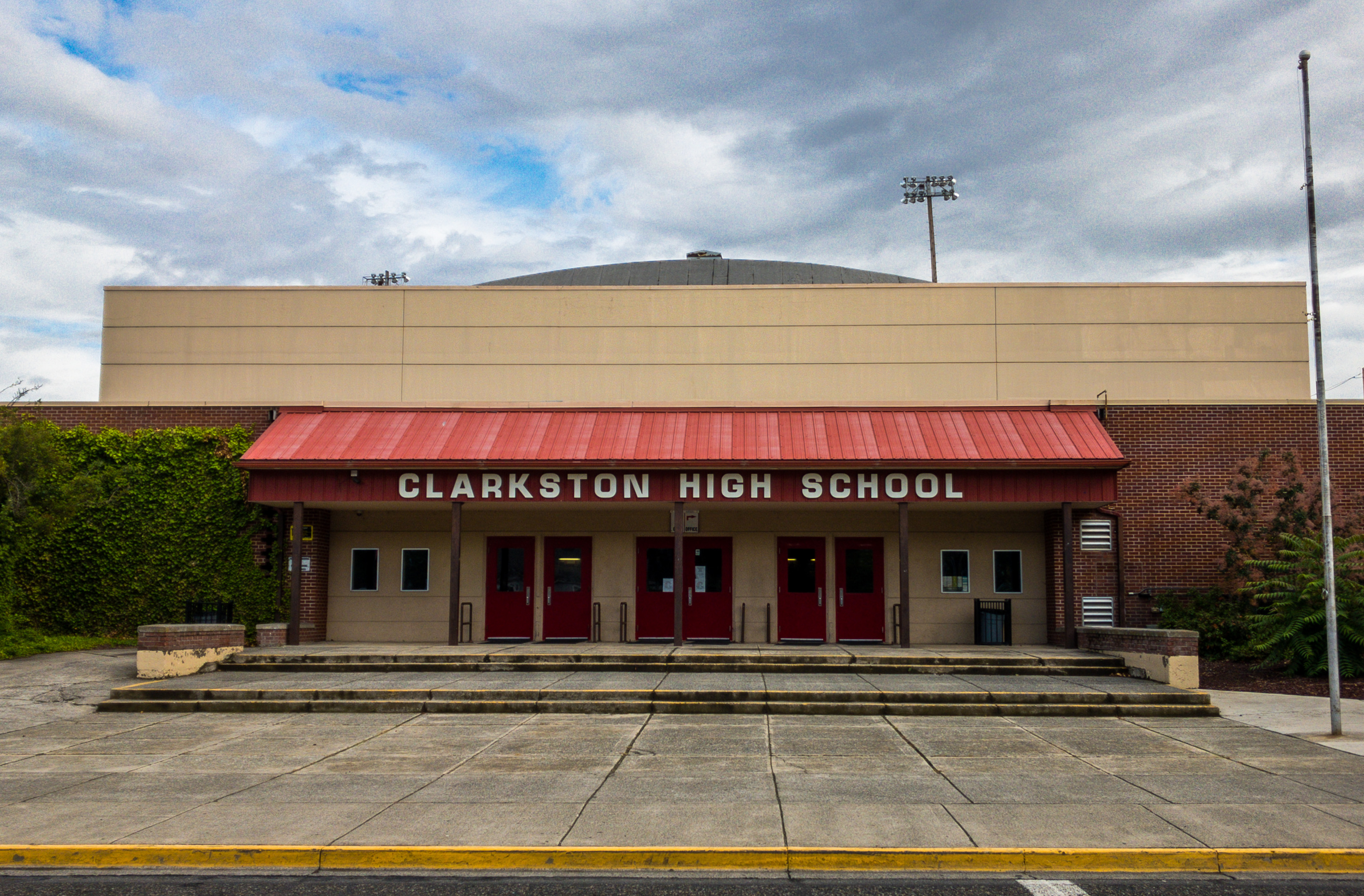
- Front entrance

Location
- 401 Chestnut Street; Clarkston, Washington 99403; United States; 46°24′37″N 117°02′34″W

Information
- Other name: Charles Francis Adams High School
- School district: Clarkston School District
- NCES School ID: 530132000234
- Principal: Doug LaMunyan
- Staff: 37.00 (FTE)
- Grades: 9–12
- Enrollment: 670
- Student to teacher ratio: 18.76
- Color
- Athletics: WIAA - Class 2A
- Athletics conference: Greater Spokane League (2A)
- Mascot: Bantam
- Rivals: Lewiston (ID), Pullman
- Elevation: 820 ft (250 m) AMSL
- Website: chs.csdk12.org

Charles Francis Adams High School, more commonly referred to as Clarkston High School, is a four-year public high school located in Clarkston, Washington. Located near Clarkston's city center, Clarkston High School is the only high school in the city. As of 2026, the school has a population of 670 students in grades 9–12, with over 100 staff members. Its mascot is the Bantam, and the school colors are red, black, and white.

== Demographics ==
As of 2026, Clarkston High School has a student population of 670 that is 0.3% Pacific Islander, 1.3% Asian, 1.5% black, 1.9% Native American, 6.6% multiracial, 12.1% Hispanic, and 76.3% white. The graduation rate is 92%.

== Athletics ==
Clarkston High School offers various sports, clubs, and activities for students throughout the school year. The sports teams compete in WIAA Class 2A and are a member of the Greater Spokane League in District Eight. Sports offered in the fall include: cross country, football, girls' swim, girls' soccer, volleyball, and cheerleading. Winter sports include: boys' basketball, girls' basketball, cheerleading, and wrestling. Spring sports include: baseball, softball, tennis, boys' golf, girls' golf, track and boys' soccer.

=== State championships ===
- Baseball: 1974, 1975
- Boys basketball: 2015, 2016
- Girls basketball: 2012
- Boys golf: 1994
- Boys tennis: 2007, 2008
- Girls tennis: 2010
- Boys wrestling: 2015

== Awards ==
Clarkston High School was awarded the 2008 State Superintendent's Learning Improvement Award, along with 97 other elementary, middle, high and alternative schools, out of approximately 2,500 schools in Washington state. Progress was measured by the scores of six years of data from the Washington Assessment of Student Learning, or the WASL.

== Rivalries ==
Clarkston High School's rivals are the Lewiston Bengals, located across the Snake River in Idaho in the twin city of Lewiston. The rivalry game in football began 120 years ago in 1906, and was formerly played on Thanksgiving Day. Additional rivals to the north in the Palouse are the Pullman Greyhounds, also in the Greater Spokane League.

== Feeder schools ==
- Elementary schools
  - Parkway Elementary School
  - Grantham Elementary School
  - Heights Elementary School
  - Highland Elementary School
- Middle school
  - Lincoln Middle School

== Notable alumni ==
- Laurie Niemi, professional football player for the NFL
- Ed Justice, professional football player
- Turk Edwards, professional football player
- Trevon Allen (2016), professional basketball player for Karditsa of the Greek Basket League; led the Bantams to the school’s only two basketball state titles in 2015 and 2016
- Steve Buratto (1961), former head coach in the Canadian Football League (CFL), Grey Cup champion in 2000
- Joel Dahmen (2006), professional golfer on the PGA Tour
- Bryan Fuller, screenwriter, producer, and film director. Known for creating the television shows Pushing Daisies, Hannibal, and co-creating Star Trek: Discovery.
