= Greater Spokane League =

- Conference: Washington Interscholastic Activities Association (WIAA)
- Founded: 1925
- No. of teams: 17
- Region: Eastern Washington, US

The Greater Spokane League (GSL) is an athletic conference for high schools in Eastern Washington, centered on the Spokane area and extending south to Pullman and Clarkston. The league took on its current name in 1976, but has existed in various forms since 1925 and was previously known as the Spokane City League. The GSL consists of 17 schools, four of which compete at the 4A level, seven at 3A and six at 2A.

== History ==
The Greater Spokane League has its origins in the Spokane City League, founded in 1925 and initially composed of Lewis and Clark High School, North Central High School, Gonzaga Prep and Hillyard. Hillyard left the league in 1931 and was replaced a year later by Rogers High School. Shadle Park High School joined in 1959, along with Central Valley and West Valley, though the latter two left the league after just two years. Ferris joined in 1965.

In 1976, the Spokane City League became the Greater Spokane League, with the existing members joined by Central Valley, Mead and University. Mt. Spokane joined in 1998 and East Valley followed suit one year later. In 2002, Cheney, Clarkston and West Valley joined. The three were in the 3A classification while the rest of the schools were classified as 4A. Classification changes continued in the following years. Cheney, Clarkston and West Valley would drop to 2A in 2004 and leave the league.

In 2020, a statewide reclassification turned the GSL from a two-tier league into one with teams in 4A, 3A and 2A. Ridgeline High School opened in 2021 as part of the Central Valley School District and joined the GSL that same year. Deer Park joined the league in 2024.

== Sponsored sports ==
=== Boys ===
Baseball, basketball, cross country, football, golf, soccer, swimming, tennis, track and field, wrestling.

=== Girls ===
Basketball, cross country, golf, gymnastics, soccer, softball (fast pitch and slow pitch), swimming, tennis, track & field, volleyball, wrestling.

== Member schools ==
School data in the table below is current for the 2023-24 season according to the GSL and NCES websites.

School	Location	Mascot	Colors	Enrollment	Class	Affiliation	Joined
Central Valley High School	Spokane Valley	Bears	Blue & White	1,336	3A	Public	1959
Cheney High School	Cheney	Blackhawks	Red & Black	1,488	3A	Public	2020
Clarkston High School	Clarkston	Bantams	Red, Black & White	694	2A	Public	2020
Deer Park High School	Deer Park	Stags	Blue & Gold	649	2A	Public	2024
East Valley High School	Spokane Valley	Knights	Green, Black & White	957	2A	Public	1999
Ferris High School	Spokane	Saxons	Scarlet & Silver	1,674	4A	Public	1965
Gonzaga Prep	Spokane	Bullpups	Navy & White	778	4A	Private	1925
Lewis and Clark High School	Spokane	Tigers	Orange & Black	1,672	4A	Public	1925
Mead High School	Fairwood	Panthers	Navy & Gold	1,805	4A	Public	1976
Mt. Spokane High School	Mead	Wildcats	Navy, Cardinal & White	1,457	3A	Public	1998
North Central High School	Spokane	Wolfpack	Red & Black	1,624	3A	Public	1925
Pullman High School	Pullman	Greyhounds	Blue & Gray	855	2A	Public	2025
Ridgeline High School	Liberty Lake	Falcons	Green & White	1,538	3A	Public	2021
Rogers High School	Spokane	Pirates	Purple, Gold, Black & White	1,511	2A	Public	1932
Shadle Park High School	Spokane	Highlanders	Green & Gold	1,423	3A	Public	1959
University High School	Spokane Valley	Titans	Crimson & Gold	1,395	3A	Public	1976
West Valley High School	Spokane Valley	Eagles	Orange & Black	821	2A	Public	1961
