= Bryan Braman =

American football player (1987–2025)

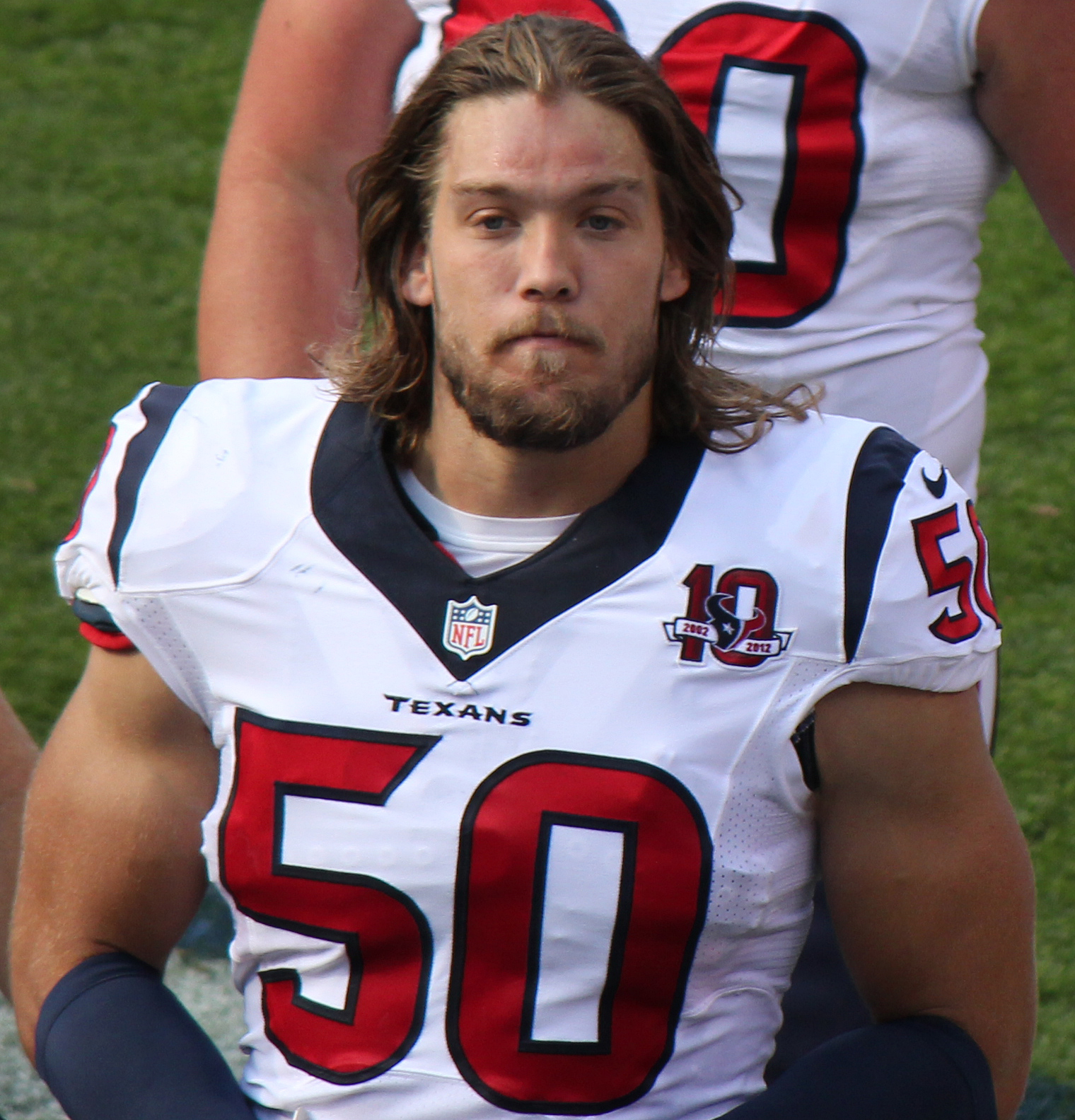
- Braman with the Houston Texans in 2012

No. 50, 56
- Position: Linebacker

Personal information
- Born: May 4, 1987; Spokane, Washington, U.S.
- Died: July 16, 2025 (aged 38); Spokane, Washington, U.S.
- Listed height: 6 ft 5 in (1.96 m)
- Listed weight: 230 lb (104 kg)

Career information
- High school: Shadle Park (Spokane)
- College: Idaho (2006); Long Beach CC (2007–2008); West Texas A&M (2009–2010)
- NFL draft: 2011: undrafted

Career history
- Houston Texans (2011–2013); Philadelphia Eagles (2014–2016); New Orleans Saints (2017)*; Philadelphia Eagles (2017)
- * Offseason or practice squad member only

Awards and highlights
- Super Bowl champion (LII)

Career NFL statistics
- Total tackles: 56
- Sacks: 1.5
- Fumble recoveries: 2
- Defensive touchdowns: 1
- Stats at Pro Football Reference

Bryan Allan Braman (/ˈbrɑːmən/ BRAH-mən; May 4, 1987 – July 16, 2025) was an American professional football player who was a linebacker for seven seasons in the National Football League (NFL). He played college football for the Idaho Vandals, Long Beach City College (LBCC), and West Texas A&M Buffaloes before being signed by the Houston Texans as an undrafted free agent in 2011. Braman was also a member of the Philadelphia Eagles and New Orleans Saints. Braman won Super Bowl LII with the Eagles in 2018.

== Early life ==
Braman was born and raised in Spokane, Washington. He was born in the Hillyard neighborhood, which was one of the city's most impoverished neighborhoods, and often moved around with his mother and younger sister. He and his sister were raised alone by his mother, Tina Braman-Fields, after his father abandoned them. His family spent significant portions of his childhood and teen years homeless.

Braman attended Shadle Park High School, where he initially ran track before deciding to join the football team.

Braman was known for his large size and athletic build. While still in high school he was already 230 pounds (100 kg) and 6 feet 5 inches (1.96 m). During his later professional career he was 241 pounds (109 kg) and the same height. Size and athleticism ran in his family, with his maternal grandfather Ivan Cecil Braman having weighed 365 pounds (166 kg) and stood 7 feet 4 inches (2.24 m). His mother had been a sprinting star while in high school.

== College career ==
Braman accepted an offer to play football at the University of Idaho, but quickly failed out. He would later recall that he had suffered depression while at Idaho. He stayed in the state of Idaho for some time, working as a concrete layer for a railroad tie company, earning slightly more than minimum wage. At this time he was homeless, spending some of his nights sleeping beside his pet dog on park benches.

Braman attended Long Beach City College (a two year community college) and played with its football team the following year.

Due to Braman having taken a year off from NCAA football after departing Idaho State, and limitations on his eligibility to play, Braman only received offers from Division II programs. He accepted an offer from West Texas A&M over offers from Central Washington and Midwestern State. Braman played strongly during his senior career, during which the team won the 2009 Lone Star Conference South Championship. Braman only played five games of his senior season, as he was suspended after being charged for psilocybin that had been found by police in a house to which he was connected. While Braman has said that he was living elsewhere at the time, his name was listed on the rental agreement, and he pleaded guilty in June 2011, being sentenced to one year of deferred adjudication and payment of a $2,000 fine. However, thirty days after sentencing, the prosecutor terminated his probation and dismissed his case.

== Professional career ==
Pre-draft measurables
Height	Weight	20-yard shuttle	Vertical jump	Broad jump	Bench press
6 ft 4 7/8 in (1.95 m)	241 lb (109 kg)	4.36 s	39.5 in (1.00 m)	10 ft 8 in (3.25 m)	21 reps
All values from Pro Day

Braman went undrafted in the 2011 NFL draft, but entered the NFL the following season with the Houston Texans, being signed as a rookie free agent.

=== Houston Texans ===
Braman became a fan favorite on the Texans' special teams unit during the 2011 season. In the season finale against the Tennessee Titans, he tackled punt returner Marc Mariani head-to-head without a helmet on. In 2012, Braman was a Pro Bowl alternate.

Braman also blocked multiple punts on special teams, including one for a touchdown against the Indianapolis Colts.

=== Philadelphia Eagles (first stint) ===
After the 2013 season, Braman left the Texans and joined the Philadelphia Eagles. Though he initially signed a two-year, $3.15 million contract on March 12, 2014, he ended up playing with the Eagles for the next three seasons, mostly on special teams.

=== New Orleans Saints ===
On August 23, 2017, Braman signed with the New Orleans Saints. He was placed on injured reserve 10 days later and was released on September 9.

=== Philadelphia Eagles (second stint) ===
On December 12, 2017, Braman re-signed with the Eagles. In the Divisional Round against the Atlanta Falcons, Braman blocked a punt from Falcons punter Matt Bosher in the 15–10 victory. The Eagles reached Super Bowl LII, where they defeated the New England Patriots 41–33 with Braman recording one tackle.

== Illness and death ==
On July 3, 2025, it was publicly reported that Braman was battling a rare and aggressive form of cancer, and a GoFundMe campaign was launched with a goal of $25,000 to assist with medical expenses. The fundraiser ultimately raised over $88,000, including a $10,000 donation from his former teammate J. J. Watt.

Braman died from his cancer at a hospital in Spokane, Washington, on July 16, 2025, at the age of 38. He is survived by two daughters.
