= West Valley High School (Spokane, Washington) =

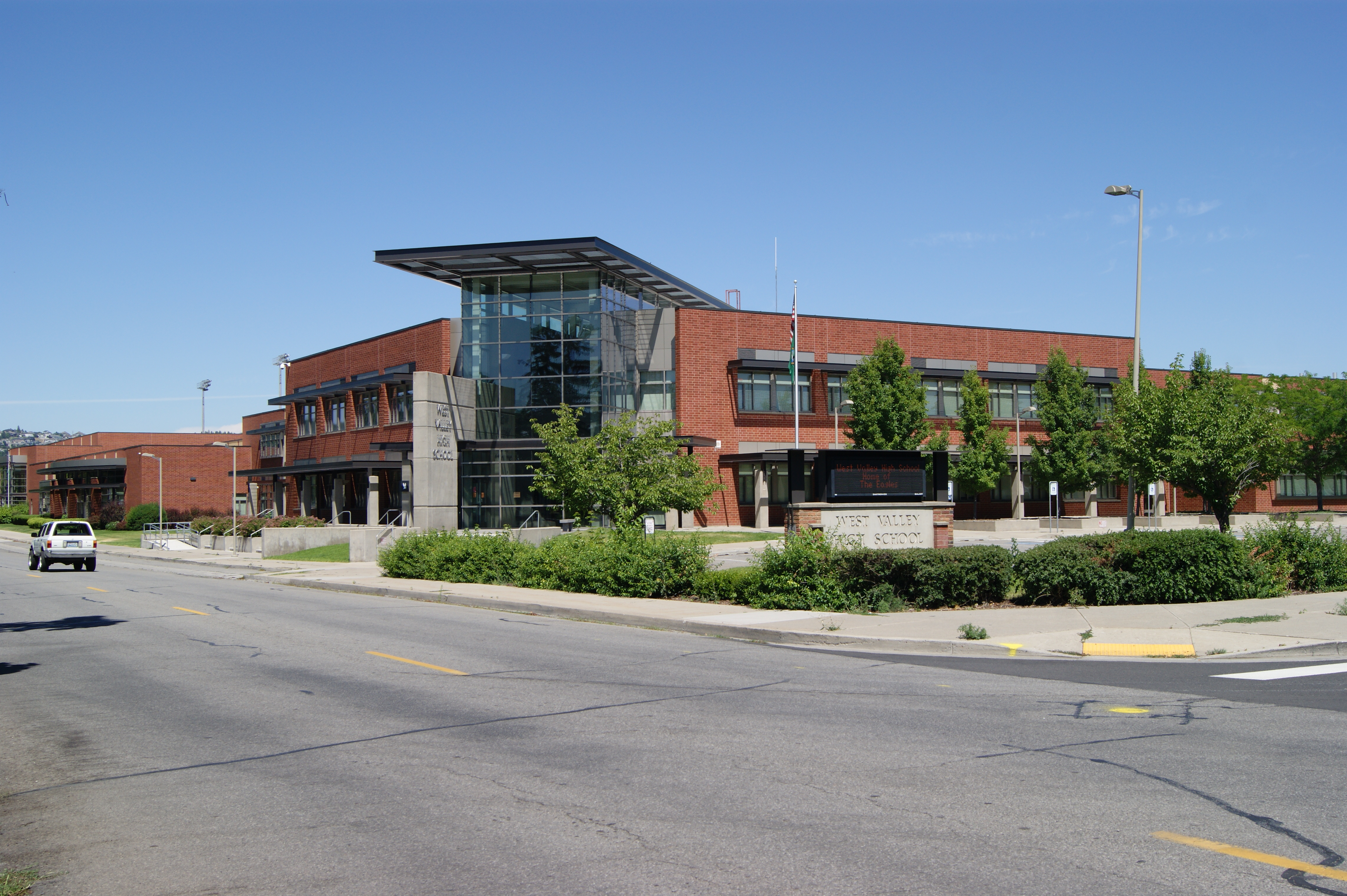

Location
- 8301 E Buckeye Avenue; Spokane Valley, Washington 99212; United States; 47°41′01″N 117°17′33″W

Information
- School type: Public High School
- Established: 1924
- School district: West Valley School District
- CEEB code: 480710
- NCES School ID: 530969001648
- Principal: Ashley Barker
- Teaching staff: 40.55 (FTE)
- Grades: 9-12
- Enrollment: 881 (2022-2023)
- Student to teacher ratio: 21.73
- Colors: Orange & Black
- Slogan: Kind, Strong, Committed
- Athletics: WIAA 2A
- Athletics conference: Greater Spokane League
- Mascot: Eagles
- Website: wvhs.wvsd.org

West Valley High School is a public secondary school in Spokane Valley, Washington. It enrolls over 900 students in grades 9 through 12. The school colors are orange and black and the mascot is the eagles.

As a Gates "Washington Achievers" grant high school, West Valley has started a mentor groups program. Staff members meet with small groups of students once a week to discuss issues in students' lives and connect with the students in the hopes that it will improve student experience and performance.

== Athletics ==
Fall sports include Football, Soccer, Volleyball, Cheerleading and Cross country. Winter sports are Basketball and Wrestling. In the spring, there is Tennis, Track and field, Baseball and Softball.

== Notable alumni ==
- Trevor St. John, actor who plays Todd Manning on One Life to Live and other movies/TV shows
- Gary Martz, Former MLB player (Kansas City Royals)
- Debra L. Stephens, Washington Supreme Court justice
- Candace Dempsey, author
