= Skyview High School (Tucson, Arizona) =

School in Arizona, United States

Coordinates: 32°14′57″N 110°49′33″W

Location
- 7820 E. Wrightstown Road; Tucson, Arizona 85715; United States

Information
- School type: Public charter high school
- Closed: June 30, 2014
- CEEB code: 030507
- Principal: Marianne Goodwin
- Grades: 9-12
- Enrollment: 254 students
- Colors: Navy blue and gray
- Mascot: Huskies
- Accreditation: North Central Association
- Website: www.skyviewhs.com

Skyview High School was a public charter high school in Tucson, Arizona. It was operated by The Leona Group.

The school was recommended for closure by The Leona Group effective June 30, 2014.
