= East Valley School District (Spokane, Washington) =

School district in Washington state, U.S.

Address
- 3830 N Sullivan Rd Spokane Valley, Washington, 99216; United States
- Coordinates: 47°41′04″N 117°14′18″W

District information
- Type: Public
- Motto: Together, we are East Valley!
- Grades: Pre-K through 12
- Established: 1888; 137 years ago
- Superintendent: Brian Talbott
- NCES District ID: 5302280

Students and staff
- Students: 3,800
- Staff: 600
- Colors: White & green

Other information
- Website: www.evsd.org

East Valley School District encompasses approximately 100 sq mi (260 km^{2}) in the City of Spokane Valley and areas of unincorporated Spokane County. The district boundaries extend from Butler Road in Spokane Valley east to the Idaho border, and from the Spokane River north to the foothills of Mount Spokane. The district operates six K-8 elementary schools; one comprehensive high school; an Enrichment Center that offers extensive early-childhood education, alternative education and special education; and a wide array of online learning programs that serve both residents of the area and many beyond. In addition, East Valley co-manages a vocational skills center with adjacent districts.

== History and development ==
East Valley School District was organized in 1886. East Trent School District #63 was the first school district in the Spokane Valley area, it was later developed with the EVSD.

In 1888, the first public school house in the East Valley School District was constructed in the area now known as Otis Orchards. This one-room schoolhouse served the areas later known as East Farms, Moab and Otis Orchards. The Little White School on the Hill was built with twenty dollars' worth of wood donated by William Pringle and was officially designated School District #76 by the territorial legislature. Washington would not become a state until one year later in 1889.

The more modern "Cobblestone School" (1909–1918) replaced the Little White School on the Hill and boasted its first graduating high school class in 1914.

A new high school wing was added to the Cobblestone School in 1918. Cobblestone School, known for its tall bell tower, shake siding and field stone trim, was allegedly designed by famous local architect Kirtland Cutter. Cutter's other local designs include the Davenport Hotel and many other historic buildings which still stand in the Spokane area.

In 1923, Stucco High School was built just west of Cobblestone School. When fire destroyed the old Cobblestone Elementary School in 1930, a second stucco building was constructed to house.

With each new building, or as additional smaller school districts combined with the Otis Orchards School District, new school district numbers were assigned. Otis Orchards School District became #314 in 1922 after combination with the Moab School District. E.H. McHenry became their first official superintendent. Borden School District from Canfield Gulch combined with Otis in 1925 creating the new district #341. Schools in Newman Lake, Idlewild and Green Mountain also combined and joined with Otis between 1933 and 1938. In 1943, Otis was renumbered to Otis Orchards School District #348.

In 1957, on a site just west of the old stucco schools, red brick additions of the new Otis Orchards Elementary began. Otis Orchards’ public schools combined with the East Trent School District #63 in 1959 forming the new East Valley School District #361,

Otis Orchards’ old stucco school buildings were used to house high school students until the new Trentwood-area East Valley High School could be completed.

The original East Valley High School opened its doors in the fall of 1960.

Harold Hoffman, superintendent of Otis Orchards Public Schools, was retained as the first superintendent of the new East Valley School District #361.

== Schools ==
- High Schools
  - East Valley High School
- Middle Schools
  - East Valley Middle School
- Elementary Schools
  - East Farms Elementary
  - Otis Orchards Elementary
  - Trent Elementary
  - Trentwood Elementary
- Choice School
  - Continuous Curriculum School (CCS)

=== Former schools ===
- Mountain View Middle school - Closed in 2011
- Skyview Elementary School - Closed in 2011 with the building given to CCS
