= NAC Architecture =

American design firm

NAC Architecture is a design firm with over 170 architects, engineers, interior designers and support staff, with offices in Columbus, Los Angeles, San Diego, Seattle, and Spokane. The firm specializes in architecture, planning, electrical engineering, interior design, and capital facilities consulting. Core markets served include education (K-12 and higher education), healthcare, laboratory, biotechnology, recreation, hospitality, civic, cultural, extended care, and restoration. Incorporated in 1970, NAC Architecture has roots in Spokane, Washington, dating back to 1960.

The firm has won over 230 design and industry awards in its history. In 2013, NAC Architecture was ranked 18th for sustainable design among architectural firms in the U.S. by ARCHITECT magazine, the official publication of the American Institute of Architects. The firm was ranked 45th overall.

In 2011, Building Design and Construction Magazine ranked NAC Architecture 30th overall and 9th among U.S. K-12 school design firms in their Giants 300 Report.

== Notable buildings ==
- Golden High School - Golden, Colorado
- Oak Harbor High School - Oak Harbor, Washington
- Bellevue High School - Bellevue, Washington
- Whitworth University East Residence Hall - Spokane, Washington
