= Dishman =

Dishman may refer to:

- Dishman (surname)
- Dishman, Washington
- Dishman Hills Natural Resources Conservation Area
- Dishman Art Museum
