= Rehkow =

Rehkow is a surname. Notable people with the surname include:

- Austin Rehkow (born 1995), American football player
- Ryan Rehkow (born 1998), American football player
