= Greenacres Middle School =

Greenacres Middle School may refer to:

- Greenacres Middle School - Bossier City, Louisiana - Bossier Parish Schools
- Greenacres Middle School - Spokane Valley, Washington - Central Valley School District
