= Kaiser Aluminum =

American materials company

Kaiser Aluminum Corporation
- Formerly: Kaiser Aluminum and Chemical Company
- Type: Public
- Traded as: Nasdaq: KALU; S&P 600 Component
- Industry: Aluminum
- Founded: 1946; 80 years ago in Washington state, U.S.
- Headquarters: Franklin, Tennessee, U.S.
- Key people: Keith A. Harvey (president and CEO)
- Products: Rolled aluminum, plate, sheet, can sheet, and extruded products.
- Revenue: ▼US$3.024 billion (2024)
- Net income: ▼US$46.8 million (2024)
- Total assets: $2.315 billion (2024)
- Number of employees: ~4,000 (2024)
- Subsidiaries: Anglesey Aluminium, Imperial Machine & Tool, Kaiser Warrick, LLC
- Website: www.kaiseraluminum.com

Kaiser Aluminum Corporation is an American aluminum producer. It is a spinoff from Kaiser Aluminum and Chemicals Corporation, which came to be when common stock was offered in Permanente Metals Corporation and Permanente Metals Corporation's name was changed to Kaiser Aluminum and Chemicals Corporation.

== History ==
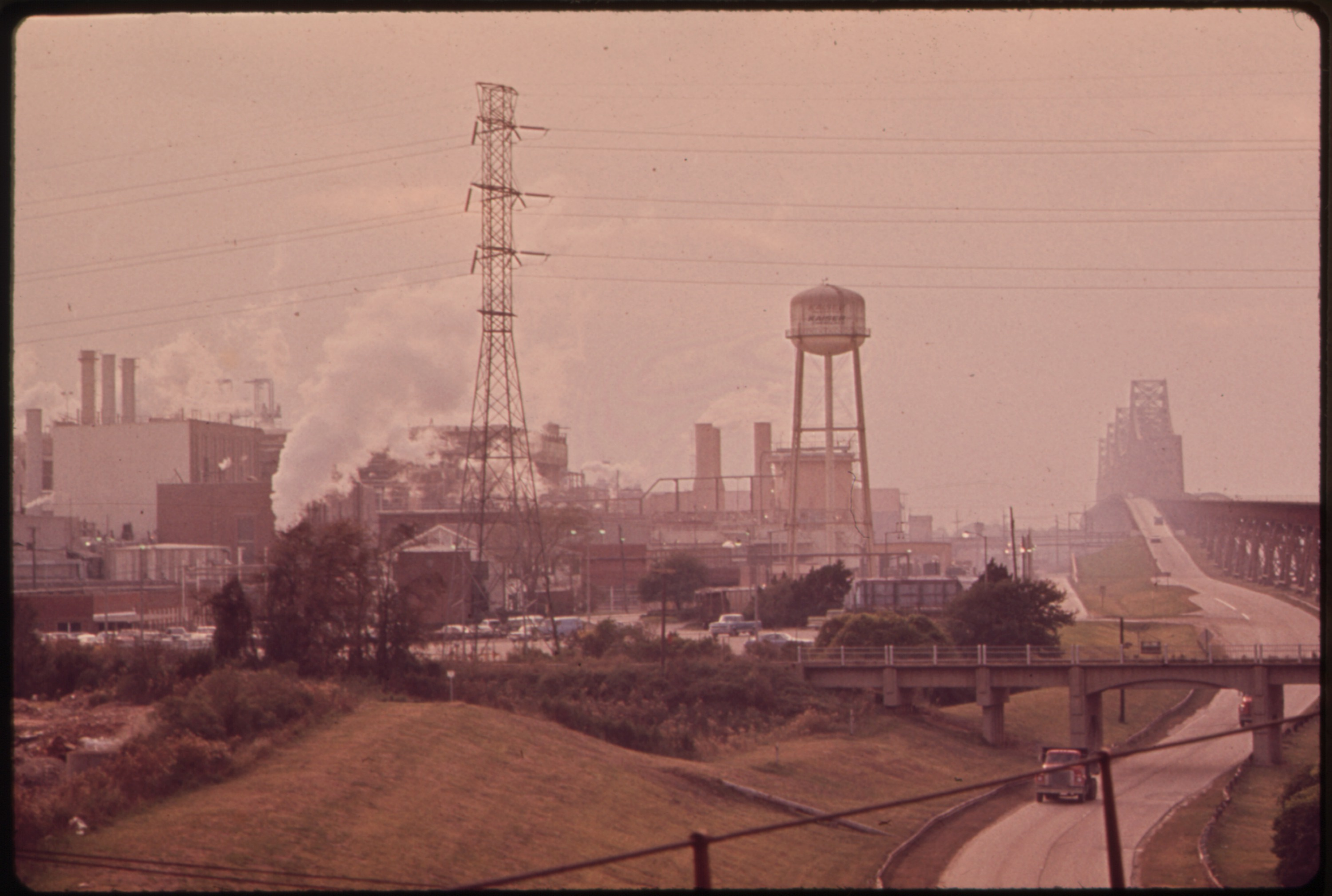
A former Kaiser Aluminum plant (1972) next to the Huey Long Bridge in Baton Rouge, Louisiana

Founded in 1946, Henry J. Kaiser's corporation entered the aluminum business by leasing, then purchasing three government-owned aluminum facilities in Washington state. These were the primary reduction plants at Mead and Tacoma, the rolling mill at Trentwood and also an alumina refinery at Baton Rouge, Louisiana. Kaiser benefited at that early juncture from some preferential treatment, the government found it more important to establish a third competitor in the aluminum industry besides Alcoa and Reynolds than to accept the highest bid (by Reynolds). Both Reynolds and Kaiser were also helped by the fact that the government had just gained royalty-free patent rights from Alcoa for an alumina production process in January 1946 (presumably as a result of United States v. Alcoa) and that leasees of government plants were allowed to benefit from the arrangement.

In the early 1950s, Kaiser Aluminum grew to be a vertically integrated aluminum producer (minus their own steamship company) with own mines on Jamaica, a refinery at Baton Rouge and smelters and finishing plants in various regional markets, drawing from more war surplus plants (at Newark, Ohio and Halethorpe, Maryland) as well as starting entirely new and fairly large plants (at Chalmette, Louisiana and at Ravenswood, West Virginia). This growth was also stimulated by significant demand created by the military, both for new production, but also for the establishment of the strategic stockpile following the exhaustion caused by the recent war and the next one in Korea.

Kaiser Aluminum previously owned a subsidiary that developed real estate, including in Rancho California, California; Oregon, Washington, and Arizona. In 1986, Kaiser Aluminum sold the bulk of the $450 million real estate holdings to an investor group led by Peter B. Bedford.

In 1988, Charles Hurwitz and his company Maxxam, Inc. purchased KaiserTech Ltd, the Oakland-based parent of Kaiser Aluminum and Chemical Company. Kaiser Aluminum filed for bankruptcy in 2002, due to labor disputes, the West Coast energy crisis, and asbestos liabilities. The steel workers union was suspicious of Hurwitz on the collapse of the Kaiser Aluminum Corporation and closely watched his 1995 FDIC lawsuit because Hurwitz has a history of loss-plagued businesses.

The company emerged from bankruptcy four years later. In March 2006, Kaiser Aluminum determined to restate its financial statements for the quarters ended March 31, 2005; June 30, 2005; and September 30, 2005, to adjust its VEBA-related payments and derivative financial instrument transactions.

The company previously owned a stake in Anglesey Aluminium, a joint venture with Rio Tinto Group. The smelter at this facility was closed in 2009, and the entire facility was fully closed in 2013.

In April 2021, Kaiser Aluminum completed acquisition of Alcoa Warrick, LLC, renaming it Kaiser Warrick, LLC. Kaiser entered into a long term ground lease with Alcoa; Alcoa retains its on site four unit coal fired generating station, smelting assets, and land assets with the remainder of the facility to be operated by Kaiser. Presently, Kaiser Aluminum Warrick operates a cast house, hot mill, cold mills, finishing mills/coating lines, and slitter lines, producing flat rolled aluminum sheet for the food and beverage container market. In July 2021, Kaiser Aluminum announced plans to construct an additional roll coating line at Kaiser Aluminum Warrick, at a cost of approximately $150 Million dollars. Construction of this line is expected to begin by the first half of 2022, and achieve initial operational capability by 2024.

== About ==
Kaiser Aluminum is headquartered in Franklin, Tennessee. In 2020, it recorded revenues of roughly US$1.173 billion. Kaiser currently owns 13 fabricating plants that can produce more than 400,000,000 pounds (180,000 long tons) of aluminum annually. The North American plants produce approximately 500,000,000 pounds (220,000 long tons) per year of value-added sheet, can sheet, plate, extrusions, forgings, rod, bar, and tube.

With the acquisition of the former Alcoa Warrick, LLC (now Kaiser Warrick, LLC), Kaiser Aluminum now employs approximately 3,700 persons.

== Facilities ==
=== Historical ===
In February 1946 Kaiser was awarded the right to lease the smelter at Mead (1946-2004) (47°45′58″N 117°21′18″W).

The rolling mill at Trentwood (1946–) (47°41′59″N 117°12′39″W) was leased beginning February 1946. Production began to ramp up in July 1946, followed shortly by the commencement of operations in Mead.

The alumina refinery at Baton Rouge (1946–1985) (30.45996°N 91.18505°W) began life as Plancor 226-AO. a Bayer process plant on 318 acres with a capacity of 500,000 tons of alumina per year, built at a cost of $25,683,385. The plant was closed and put on standby in July 1944. It began to produce again in December 1946, when since April under 5-year lease by Kaiser, at a time when Kaiser share at the Mead smelter reached 4 potlines. B. Rouge replaced the previous utilization of stockpiled alumina at Mead, but only enough soda ash was allotted by the government to run Baton Rouge at 85% of the Mead requirements at the beginning. Together with the almost finished Chalmette plant, its capacity was decided to be increased in November 1951, to 800,000 tons per year.

The war surplus smelter at Tacoma (1947–) (47°14′29″N 122°27′34″W) was bought outright by Kaiser for $3,000,000 in December 1946 with another $1,000,000 estimated to be needed to make it a viable operation. During the war the $6,309,240 and 41,500,000 pounds per year reduction plant was operated as by the Olin Industries, Inc.. Plancor 245 was a 100-acre facility with 233,000sqft under roof including 2 pot room buildings with a total of 240 Soderberg pots, the only one of the DPC plants making use of the process, and the one with the poorest wartime performance record. Power provided by the Bonneville Power Administration.

Soda ash plant at Owens Lake (1947–1950) (36.4332°N 117.9509°W). In the spring of 1947 Kaiser entered into 20-year lease with the state of California to extract approximately 500,000 tons of brine per year from Owens Lake, to be converted to 100,000 tons of soda ash. This plant was rapidly constructed and produced at 100 tons a day by April, filling a critical bottleneck. The plant was closed in 1950, after the supply situation had been dealt with.

In 1948 the war surplus rod mill later to become the rod and wire mill at Newark (1948–) (precisely at 40.01541°N 82.46577°W) was purchased by Kaiser Aluminum. Built as Plancor 936, a bar and rod mill of 300,000,000 pounds/year capacity costing $23,198,000, operated during wartime beginning May 1943 by Alcoa. Ingots 486m pounds/year, blooming 348m, 180m pounds of blooms usable for production of 150m pounds of rods and bars. In January 1947 was leased by the Reynolds Metals Company., but in September 1947 again offered for purchase or lease by the government. The equipment that was in 1954 still in operation from those early days of wartime production were remelt furnaces, one 38-inch 2-high blooming mill and one 22-inch 3-high finishing mill. New equipment was installed at a cost of $9,000,000 and surveyed thusly in 1954: one 10-inch finishing mill, wire drawing machines, stranding bays, continuous vulcanizing machines and plastic tuber, banbury mixer, rubber mills, triplers and quadruplers and finally electrical conductor test equipment. The wire mill trains started out with 12 feet long and 6 inches square ingots, cut down to pieces of 70-inch length and then rolled on the 10-inch mill into a 3/8-inch rod nearly 1/2 mile long in 55 seconds, in total 235,000 pounds per shift. Rods and bars were either sold, or rods were used to make wires up to 0.0056 inches thin. The wire train started with nine 8 and 10-die tandem drawing machines, followed if desired by one 13-die machine, followed if desired by one of twenty up-to-16-dies machines for the finest wire. Intermediate anneals as necessary. Wires could then be stranded around aluminum and steel cores or coated with insulation. Wire production capacity of 18,000,000 pounds / year.

Construction of a 100,000 tons/year smelter at Chalmette (1951–1983), on the banks of the Mississippi River (precisely at 29.9376°N 89.98117°W) was announced November 1950. Shortly before the plant started production at the end of 1951, doubling of the capacity was decided, primarily first for military stockpiling amidst the Korean War. As a consequence this incurred an increase by 60 percent of the Baton Rouge refinery, together with matching increase of bauxite mining in Jamaica. Construction at Chalmette started February 20, 1951, production commenced on December 11 with completion of the first potline. Eight potlines were expected to produce 400,000,000 pounds per year when completed mid-1953. This would then bring Kaiser aluminum production to 790,000,000 pounds per year or 28 percent nationwide. Total spending on Chalmette was $45,000,000. The plant had 16 pot-room buildings, two for each pot line, each room with 72 Soderberg-type pots of 40 pounds per hour capacity. Six of the lines were powered by 16 AC generators with rectifiers, two lines were powered by 80 1650 hp Nordberg radial gas engines each driving a DC generator. Fuel requirements amounted to 50 billion cuft of natural gas per year. Potline #2 went into production on March 5, 1951. A 9th potline was later added in the spring of 1958.

In March 1951, as part of a $78,000,000 expansion program that included paying of the total debt to the government of $37,394,250, Kaiser leased for 5 years the aluminum and magnesium extrusion plant at Halethorpe (1951–) (39°14′23″N 76°40′49″W). (recently 7th potline at Mead) The government had been trying to privatize the $7,000,000 war surplus facility since at least the spring of 1946. During the war, the plant was operated by the Revere Copper & Brass Co. The plant was with Kaiser Alu until at least 1961.

On February 11, 1953, first shipment of 10,000 tons from Port Kaiser (precisely at 17.86255°N 77.60492°W, also called Little Pedro Point) was loaded onto the SS Evanthia (ex-George Bellows USMC hull 1947 EC2-S-C1, Greek flag, owned by P.J. Goulandris & Sons). The mine was 13 miles away from the port facilities, connected by a Kaiser-built railroad. Total capacity of the 19,000-acre mining claim on Jamaica was 2,000,000 tons of bauxite per year, estimated to last for at least 50 years. The $12,000,000 mining operation on Jamaica replaced the former source in South America. Differences in ore composition and increased capacity necessitated a $23,000,000 expansion and remodeling program at Baton Rouge, bringing the capacity there to 800,000 tons of alumina per year. Baton Rouge was the supply for all 3 (Mead, Tacoma, Chalmette) smelters. The overall expansion program to reach 800,000,000 pounds per year corporation-wide was approximately worth $200,000,000.

In October 1954, Kaiser leased the forging plant at Erie (42°7′46″N 80°5′6″W), formerly operated by Willys-Overland. Plancor 1395.

In August 1954, plans for the construction of a new plant (later to become an integrated mill at Ravenswood (1955–)) on the banks of the Ohio River (38.93264°N 81.82616°W, precisely) were announced. Work was to begin in January 1955 on a 72 million pounds re-roll facility to be supplied by Trentwood. Immediately to follow was a program to upgrade the plant to become capable of all rolling and finishing steps and produce 250 million pounds of sheets and foil from supplies of aluminum pig out of the Chalmette plant near New Orleans. This was number 3 of Kaiser production plants in the east, after Newark (rod, bar, wire, electrical conductor) and Halethorpe (extrusions). In 1958 the plant included 4 potlines with a capacity of 145,000 tons per year and a new hot rolling mill began operation. Bauxite was delivered from Jamaica via Baton Rouge (for refining). The favorable near-market location at Ravenswood, and the shortening of the production chain by cutting out the Washington state plants, came at the price of no cheap source of power. A 40-year contract for 450,000kW of coal-generated electricity was made with the Ohio Power Company. The plant ran around-the-clock in the summer of 1958, additional cold-rolling capacity was planned with the goal of reaching a capacity of 175,000 tons per year. The capital investment in Ravenswood up to that point was approximately $200,000,000.

=== Not Aluminum ===
A fluorspar mine at Gabbs (-1957), closed in 1957 due to depletion.

A fluorspar mill at Fallon (-1957) placed on standby in 1957.

A magnesium plant at Manteca, California, probably never owned by Kaiser. Built as Plancor 707. An emergency reserve operation of inferior efficiency, the plant was shut down in June 1944 when no longer needed after being in operation for 18 to 20 months. The still government-owned plant was activated in January 1951 and operated by Kaiser Aluminum.

== Production ==
A delivery contract for 186,000 tons of primary aluminum from Canada in the years 1953-1958 was announced on May 25, 1953. A similar contract with Alcoa called for 600,000 tons in the same period. Almost all was to be provided by Alcan, who was expecting to start production at Kitimat in the summer of 1954.

U.S. Aluminum production capacity tons/year
	Jan 1951	Dec 1952	Jan 1956
Chalmette		100,000	200,000
Mead	145,000	175,000	175,000
Tacoma	25,000	33,200	33,200
Totals
Alcoa	368,750	568,750	706,500
Reynolds	231,500	359,500	414,500
Kaiser	170,000	308,200	408,200
Anaconda			60,000
