= Ryan Rehkow =

American football player (born 1998)

No. 8 – Cincinnati Bengals
- Position: Punter
- Roster status: Active

Personal information
- Born: September 11, 1998 (age 28); Veradale, Washington, U.S.
- Listed height: 6 ft 4 in (1.93 m)
- Listed weight: 235 lb (107 kg)

Career information
- High school: Central Valley (Spokane Valley, Washington)
- College: BYU (2020–2023)
- NFL draft: 2024: undrafted

Career history
- Kansas City Chiefs (2024)*; Cincinnati Bengals (2024–present)
- * Offseason or practice squad member only

Awards and highlights
- PFWA All-Rookie Team (2024); First-team All-Big 12 (2023)

Career NFL statistics as of Week 10, 2026
- Punts: 144
- Punting yards: 7,059
- Average punt: 49.0
- Longest punt: 80
- Inside 20: 68
- Stats at Pro Football Reference

Ryan Rehkow (REE-koh; born September 11, 1998) is an American professional football punter for the Cincinnati Bengals of the National Football League (NFL). He played college football for the BYU Cougars and was signed in 2024 by the Kansas City Chiefs as an undrafted free agent.

== Early life ==
Rehkow grew up in Veradale, Washington and attended Central Valley High School where he lettered in football and basketball. Coming out of high school, Rehkow decided to commit to play college football for the BYU Cougars.

== College career ==
Rehkow made his first punt in week one of the 2020 season against Navy which traveled 56 yards. Rehkow finished the 2020 season punting 28 times for an average of 45.1 yards per punt and a rush for 49 yards. In week three of the 2021 season, Rehkow set a BYU school record with an 83-yard punt versus Arizona State. In the 2021 season, Rehkow punted 40 times for an average of 48.6 yards per punt, as he was on the Ray Guy Award watch list throughout the season. For his performance on the 2021 season, Rehkow was named the Pro Football Network independent punter of the year. During the 2022 season, Rehkow punted 40 times for an average of 46.2 yards per punt and a long of 71. In the 2023 season opener, Rehkow was named the co-Big 12 special team player of the week after punting nine times for an average of 53.2 yards, a long of 65, and four punts inside the 20-yard line, as he helped the Cougars to a 14-0 win over Sam Houston. During the 2023 season Rehkow punted 68 times for an average 48.3 yards, where for his performance on the season he was named second team all Big-12. After the conclusion of the 2023 season, Rehkow declared for the 2024 NFL draft.

== Professional career ==
Pre-draft measurables
Height	Weight	Arm length	Hand span	Wingspan
6 ft 4 3/8 in (1.94 m)	235 lb (107 kg)	31 1/4 in (0.79 m)	8 7/8 in (0.23 m)	6 ft 4 3/8 in (1.94 m)
All values from NFL Combine

=== Kansas City Chiefs ===
Rehkow was signed by the Kansas City Chiefs as an undrafted free agent after the 2024 NFL draft. Rehkow was released by the Chiefs on June 13, 2024.

=== Cincinnati Bengals ===
On July 26, 2024, Rehkow signed with the Cincinnati Bengals. Rehkow, an undrafted rookie free agent, won the starting punter job and made the Bengals' 53 man roster. In his professional debut on September 8, Rehkow set the NFL record for gross punt average in a game, with a 64.5 yard average on four punts, breaking the previous mark of 63.6 set by AJ Cole III in 2023. Furthermore, Rehkow's long of 80 yards in his debut was the longest punt in Bengals franchise history. He was named to the PFWA All-Rookie Team.

On February 18, 2025, Rehkow and the Bengals agreed to a two-year contract extension.

In Week 7 of the 2026 season against the Baltimore Ravens, Rehkow punted four times, with three coming to rest inside the 10-yard line and one inside the 5, averaging 46 yard per punt, with a long of 56 yards and was named AFC Special Teams Player of the Week.

== NFL career statistics ==
Legend
**Bold**	Career high

=== Regular season ===
Year	Team	GP	Punting						
Year	Team	GP	Punts	Yds	Lng	Avg	Blk	Ins20	RetY
2024	CIN	**17**	53	2,603	**80**	49.1	0	25	228
2025	CIN	**17**	**65**	**3,285**	70	**50.5**	0	**28**	**277**
2026	CIN	9	26	1,171	66	45.0	0	15	86
Career		43	144	7,059	80	49.0	0	68	591

== Personal life ==
Rehkow is the younger brother of former NFL kicker, Austin Rehkow. His youngest brother, Cameron Tyler Rehkow, had leukemia at the age of 11. He married his wife Hadlee in 2022.

Rehkow is a member of The Church of Jesus Christ of Latter-day Saints and served a mission for the church in London, England.
