= Austin Rehkow =

American football player (born 1995)

No. 5, 4
- Position: Punter

Personal information
- Born: March 17, 1995 (age 31); Anchorage, Alaska, U.S.
- Listed height: 6 ft 3 in (1.91 m)
- Listed weight: 214 lb (97 kg)

Career information
- High school: Central Valley (Spokane Valley, Washington)
- College: Idaho
- NFL draft: 2017: undrafted

Career history
- Buffalo Bills (2017)*; New York Giants (2018)*; Salt Lake Stallions (2019); Houston Roughnecks (2020); Indianapolis Colts (2020–2021)*
- * Offseason or practice squad member only

Awards and highlights
- 3× First-team All-Sun Belt Punter (2014–2016); FBS Independent Special Teams Player of the Year Punter (2013); 2× Second-team All-Sun Belt Kicker (2015, 2016); First-team Walter Camp All-American Punter (2013); Second-team Walter Camp All-American (2014); AP Third-team All-American - Punter (2013)
- Stats at Pro Football Reference

Austin Rehkow (REE-koh; born March 17, 1995) is an American former professional football punter. He played college football for the Idaho Vandals football team at the University of Idaho.

== Early life ==
Rehkow was raised in Veradale, Washington and attended Central Valley High School in Spokane Valley, Washington. He also played soccer before switching to American football. In 2012, Rehkow set the record for the longest field goal ever kicked in the state of Washington, measuring 67 yards, just one shy of the national high school record set in 1986 by Dirk Borgognone. Kelly Imhoff made (62 yards) in 1929 and Larry Stovall-Moody (60 yards) in 1996 are the only 3 60 yards or more kicked in the state of Washington. It was one of three field goals of over 50 yards Rehkow kicked that year.

== Professional career ==
Pre-draft measurables
Height	Weight	Arm length	Hand span
6 ft 2 7/8 in (1.90 m)	214 lb (97 kg)	31 7/8 in (0.81 m)	9 7/8 in (0.25 m)
All values from NFL Combine

Rehkow went undrafted in the 2017 NFL draft, with the league's scouting combine profile concluding he lacked the leg strength to be a full-time placekicker but had enough precision as a punter to have a future in the league.

On May 5, 2017, Rehkow signed with the Buffalo Bills, who had released their previous placekickers Jordan Gay and Dan Carpenter at the end of the 2016 season. He was waived on August 20, 2017, having lost the competition to Stephen Hauschka.

On January 1, 2018, Rehkow signed a reserve/future contract with the New York Giants as a punter. He was waived by the Giants on May 7, 2018.

In 2018, Rehkow joined the Salt Lake Stallions of the Alliance of American Football as a punter. The league ceased operations in April 2019.

In October 2019, Rehkow was selected by the Houston Roughnecks in the 2020 XFL draft's open phase. He had his contract terminated when the league suspended operations on April 10, 2020.

On December 23, 2020, Rehkow signed with the Indianapolis Colts' practice squad. On January 10, 2021, Rehkow signed a reserve/futures contract with the Colts. On April 28, 2021, Rehkow was waived by the Colts.

== Personal life ==
Rehkow is the older brother of Cincinnati Bengals punter, Ryan Rehkow. Austin and Ryan's youngest brother, Cameron Tyler Rehkow, had leukemia when he was 11-years-old.

Rehkow is a member of the Church of Jesus Christ of Latter-day Saints.
