= Ridgeline High School =

Ridgeline High School may refer to:

- Ridgeline High School (Utah)
- Ridgeline High School (Washington)
