= Ridgeline High School (Washington) =

Location
- 20150 E Country Vista Drive; Liberty Lake, Washington 99019; United States
- Coordinates: 47°39′46″N 117°08′16″W

Information
- Type: public high school
- Established: September 8, 2021; 4 years ago
- School district: Central Valley School District
- Superintendent: John Parker
- CEEB code: 480159
- NCES School ID: 530111003781
- Principal: Jesse Hardt
- Teaching staff: 67.00 (on an FTE basis)
- Grades: 9–12
- Gender: Coeducational
- Enrollment: 1,538 (2023–2024)
- Student to teacher ratio: 22.96
- Campus size: 60 acres (24 ha)
- Area: 242,466 square feet (22,525.8 m^{2})
- Campus type: Suburban
- Colors: Green and White
- Athletics conference: Greater Spokane League
- Mascot: Falcons
- Team name: Falcons
- Yearbook: Eyrié
- Feeder schools: Selkirk Middle School; Greenacres Middle School
- Website: rhs.cvsd.org

Ridgeline High School (RHS), often referred to as simply Ridgeline, is a comprehensive public high school for grades nine through twelve in Liberty Lake, Washington, United States. It is part of the Central Valley School District in Spokane County, and is one of three such high schools in the district along with Central Valley High School and University High School.

== History ==
Aerial view of the campus and facilities at Ridgeline

Central Valley School District had been planning for a new high school for 40 years. Initial planning for a $129.9 million dollar bond were in motion in early 2017 to fund a number of school district projects, including a new high school. Voters in the district approved the bond measure by 70% in early 2018. Plans in 2017 initially had the new school at land the district had acquired in 1980 that was in the Saltese Flats area. The Saltese Flats site had a number of issues, such as building height restrictions that would have required some structures to be built partially underground, as well as the necessity of extending major utilities to the site. The district decided against going over their budget and instead purchased more than 99 acres (40 ha) from the Spokane Gun Club, with the intention of building on that site. Environmental concerns with the Spokane Gun Club site were addressed through a commitment of up to $1 million dollars by the club to clean up lead from the property, with the district covering costs beyond that and the Washington State Department of Ecology inspecting the land. Enhanced security was a focus of the new school, including increased cameras and an intercom system for granting entry. Funding for the school was provided by the bond approved by voters as well as matching construction funds from the state. On November 26, 2018, a 14-person naming committee selected "Ridgeline High School" as the name of the new school from more than 430 proposed names. Among the three final recommended names were "Saltese High School" and "Chief Andrew Seltice High School". According to the school district, Ridgeline High School was chosen because it was a "strong and powerful" name and also described the local geography of the area. Construction began in late August 2019, with construction completing two years later.

The finished school is 242,466 square feet (22,525.8 m^{2}), sits on 60 acres (24 ha) and cost a total of $96,000,000 in 2021 (equivalent to about $114,061,157 in 2025) dollars. It was dedicated on August 31, 2021 during an open house event. Ridgeline opened on September 8, 2021 to 950 students (freshmen, sophomores and juniors), but was designed to handle up to 1,600 students. Seniors were left in their original high schools so they could finish out their schooling at the same school, so the first year did not have a graduating class. The new school reduced overcrowding at the other two high schools in the district which each had about 1,500 students during Ridgeline's inaugural year. In prior years, the two other schools housed 4,300 students combined, despite only being designed to house 3,200.

== Academics ==
=== Enrollment ===
As of the 2021–2022 school year, the school had an enrollment of 950 students and 51 classroom teachers (on an FTE basis), for a student–teacher ratio of 18.63.

== Extracurriculars ==
Ridgeline football field

=== Athletics ===
Ridgeline is a member of the Washington Interscholastic Activities Association (WIAA), where it is classified as a 3A school and is part of District 8 (Greater Spokane League (GSL)). Since the school opened in 2021, it has offered the full complement of sports supported by the GSL.

== Girls' Volleyball ==
In 2024, Ridgeline won its first 4A Washington State Championship in volleyball.
