= Central Valley School District (Washington) =

School district in Spokane Valley, Washington, U.S.

Address
- 2218 N. Molter Road Liberty Lake, Washington, 99019; United States
- Coordinates: 47°40′40″N 117°05′25″W

District information
- Motto: Inspiring and empowering learners to be contributing citizens in our changing world.
- Grades: K—12
- Established: 1890; 136 years ago
- Superintendent: John Parker
- NCES District ID: 5301110
- Affiliations: Washington State Office of Superintendent of Public Instruction, U.S. Department of Education

Students and staff
- Enrollment: 14,158 (2020-2021)
- Staff: 819.79 (on an FTE basis)
- Student–teacher ratio: 17.27

Other information
- Website: cvsd.org

Central Valley School District No. 356 is a K–12 public school district located in Spokane Valley and Liberty Lake, Washington. Over 14,100 students attend one of the twenty-one schools within the district.

== History ==
The school district was founded in 1890 as Vera District. Going to school was difficult, especially compared to modern standards, as there was no good transportation system and little funding.

In the 1920s, Vera District, as well as four near by school districts were consolidated. Vera, Greenacres, Liberty Lake, Saltese, and Lone Fir school districts were merged to make the district more effective. The consolidation caused overcrowding at the high school, which was built in 1912.

To adapt to life after World War II, the County Superintendent of Schools, W. F. Standeford, changed the district into what is known today as Central Valley School District No. 356 and started building new schools funded by a levy. This was necessary as the post-war baby boomers cause an influx of children that crowded the system.

Later there was need for another high school. In 1960, the two-year construction of University High School began. Its new teaching methods garnered the district national recognition. Eventually both University High School and Central Valley High School became outdated and crowded. Both schools were built anew in 2002, mirror images of each other except for the building orientation and brick color.

== Boundary ==
The district includes all of Liberty Lake and portions of Spokane Valley. It includes the former census-designated place of Greenacres.

== Schools ==
Ridgeline High School against surrounding environment

=== High schools ===
- Central Valley High School
- University High School
- Ridgeline High School
- Mica Peak High School (Alternative High School)

=== Middle schools ===
- Bowdish Middle School
- Evergreen Middle School
- Greenacres Middle School
- Horizon Middle School
- North Pines Middle School
- Selkirk Middle School

=== K-8 ===
- Summit Expeditionary School K-8

=== Elementary schools ===
- Adams Elementary School
- Broadway Elementary School
- Chester Elementary School
- Greenacres Elementary School
- Liberty Lake Elementary School
- Liberty Creek Elementary School
- McDonald Elementary School
- Opportunity Elementary School
- Ponderosa Elementary School
- Progress Elementary School
- Riverbend Elementary School
- South Pines Elementary School
- Sunrise Elementary School
- University Elementary School

== Levy ==
In 2012, a replacement levy to support the school district was approved. The cost is $3.54 per $1,000.00 assessed property value. The previous levy expired (it was still in effect when the replacement was proposed) at the end of 2012. It is expected to earn over $27 million annually to pay for maintenance and operational costs. As opposed to older levies, this levy does not allocate funds for any new construction.

The district gets funding from other taxes/sources.
