= Spokane Valley Heritage Museum =

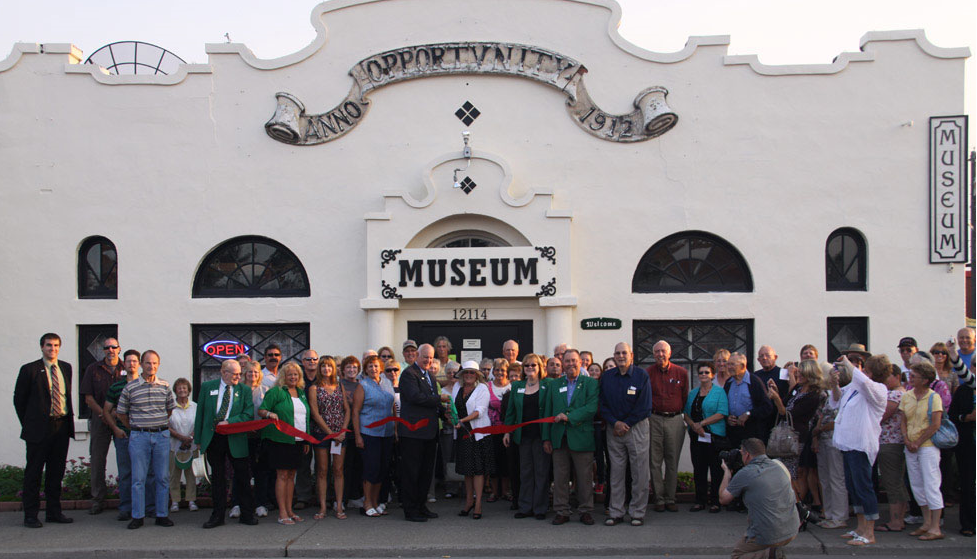
- Museum Director Jayne Singleton and Mayor Tom Towey cutting the ribbon during the opening of the Museum.

- Location within Washington (state)
- Established: 18 August 2005
- Coordinates: 47.65688°N 117.241883°W
- Type: Historical museum
- https://www.spokanevalleymuseum.com/

The Spokane Valley Heritage Museum is located in Spokane Valley, Washington. The museum is located within the historic Opportunity Township Hall which was added to the National Register of Historic Places listings in Spokane County, Washington on March 15, 2005. The museum opened on August 18, 2005 and in 2013 the museum received the key to the City of Spokane Valley. The museum is dedicated to preserving and sharing the heritage of the Spokane Valley area and surrounding regions. The museum preserves history through stories including agricultural heritage, aviation history, military life and much more. They offer engaging, informational exhibits, introducing their visitors to the people, places and events that made the Valley and surrounding areas what they are today. The Valley’s roots lie in the strength, courage and desire of the settlers who were in search of the American dream. The museum offers rotating exhibits that educate not only about our local history, but also state and national history, and even space exploration. In addition to the exhibits, the museum contains an extensive archive of photos and maps, as well as a variety of primary source documents from newspapers to yearbooks. All the documents are available for perusal by museum patrons.

The museum strives to continue to serve the community preserving and maintaining access to history and sustaining the preservation of our community’s heritage and has accumulated over 8000 archive records in their searchable database. There are over 14,000 historical images in their collection, and the museum has a catalogue containing over 150 years of artifacts, photos, maps and other documents, and they are continually adding to their catalogue.

Annually, the museum has over 4,000 visitors from each of the 50 states, and some of the museum's visitors even come from out of the country. Regularly the museum brings traveling exhibits, which has included three Smithsonian Traveling Exhibits (2005, 2015, 2018). The museum has an excellent array of educational resources and programs for school children, youth groups and adult groups, and during the spring months, school aged children visit the museum, often for the first time, with their classmates to learn about their community. The museum works with local area businesses to preserve history by placing historic monuments on significant landmarks. Businesses and individuals that relocate to the area, often come to the museum looking to find historic and cultural information about their property and/or building. The museum also provides resources and information to the City’s leaders to help them better serve the community, with an understanding of the Valley’s identity, history and heritage. The museum is staffed primarily by community volunteers who have a passion for history and education. Check the online photo site. More images are added frequently. Go to the website, spokanevalleymuseum.com. Click on the research tab and the click on the red "photos" tab.

The museum is open Wednesday to Saturday from 11am – 4pm.
