= Greenacres, Washington =

- Locale
- Location of the CDP of Greenacres, Washington at the 2000 Census
- Coordinates: 47°39′48″N 117°9′24″W
- Country: United States
- State: Washington
- County: Spokane

Area
  - Total: 3.4 sq mi (8.7 km^{2})
  - Land: 3.3 sq mi (8.6 km^{2})
  - Water: 0.039 sq mi (0.1 km^{2})

Population (2000)
  - Total: 5,158
  - Density: 1,555/sq mi (600.3/km^{2})
- Time zone: UTC-8 (Pacific (PST))
  - Summer (DST): UTC-7 (PDT)
- ZIP code: 99016
- Area code: 509
- FIPS code: 53-28520
- GNIS feature ID: 1505280

Greenacres is a locale and former census-designated place (CDP) in Spokane County, Washington, United States. The locale is almost entirely split between the city of Spokane Valley and unincorporated Spokane County, with a small portion being located within the city of Liberty Lake. Greenacres retains its own post office.

Greenacres has two schools in the Central Valley School named after it; Greenacres Middle School and Greenacres Elementary School.

== History ==
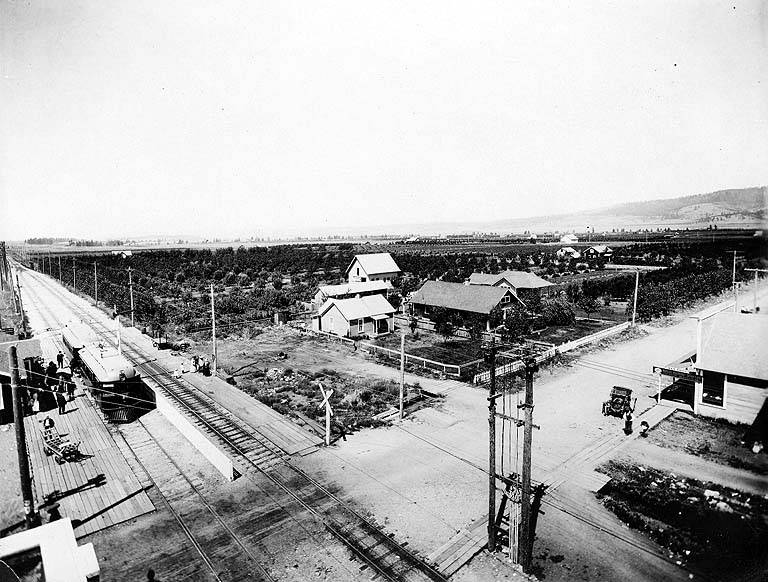
Greenacres ca. 1910

Greenacres was listed as a census-designated place (CDP) in the 2000 census with the spelling "Green Acres". The community largely became part of Spokane Valley when that city incorporated in March 2003. Since then the name Greenacres has been classified as an "official common name for a populated location within an incorporated place".

The majority of the CDP became part of the city of Spokane Valley upon its incorporation in 2003. An additional section of the CDP became part of the city of Liberty Lake in 2006. The population was 5,158 at the 2000 census.

== Geography ==
Greenacres is located at 47°39′48″N 117°9′24″W (47.663450, -117.156537).

According to the United States Census Bureau, the CDP had a total area of 3.4 square miles (8.8 km^{2}), of which, 3.3 square miles (8.5 km^{2}) was land and 0.1 square miles (0.26 km^{2}) of it (1.78%) was water.

== Demographics ==
Historical population
Census	Pop.	Note	%±
1950	1,287		—
1960	2,074		61.1%
1970	2,324		12.1%
1990	4,626		—
2000	5,158		11.5%
2007 (est.)	5,618
U.S. Decennial Census; 1960 1970 1980 1990; 2000 2010

Greenacres first appeared as an unincorporated community in the 1950 U.S. census; and as a census designated place in the 1980 U.S. census. The CDP was dissolved after being absorbed into the newly incorporated cities of Liberty Lake in 2001 and Spokane Valley in 2003.

As of the census of 2000, there were 5,158 people, 2,021 households, and 1,414 families residing in the CDP. The population density was 1,554.7 per square mile (600.3/km^{2}). There were 2,126 housing units at an average density of 640.8 per square mile (247.4/km^{2}). The racial makeup of the CDP was 95.17% White, 0.47% African American, 1.01% Native American, 0.72% Asian, 0.02% Pacific Islander, 0.33% from other races, and 2.29% from two or more races. Hispanic or Latino of any race were 2.46% of the population.

There were 2,021 households, out of which 33.2% had children under the age of 18 living with them, 56.2% were married couples living together, 10.3% had a female householder with no husband present, and 30.0% were non-families. 24.6% of all households were made up of individuals, and 8.8% had someone living alone who was 65 years of age or older. The average household size was 2.55 and the average family size was 3.04.

In the CDP, the age distribution of the population shows 26.8% under the age of 18, 6.5% from 18 to 24, 28.9% from 25 to 44, 24.6% from 45 to 64, and 13.1% who were 65 years of age or older. The median age was 38 years. For every 100 females, there were 97.9 males. For every 100 females age 18 and over, there were 93.6 males.

The median income for a household in the CDP was $36,290, and the median income for a family was $38,839. Males had a median income of $32,488 versus $22,361 for females. The per capita income for the CDP was $15,494. About 7.0% of families and 10.5% of the population were below the poverty line, including 14.4% of those under age 18 and 2.5% of those age 65 or over.
