= Spokane Valley Fire Department =

Fire department in Washington, U.S.

Operational area
- Country: United States
- State: Washington
- County: Spokane County
- Municipality: Spokane Valley, Liberty Lake, Millwood

Agency overview
- Established: 1940; 86 years ago
- Employees: 200 (2020)
- EMS level: ALS & BLS

Facilities and equipment
- Stations: 10

Website
- Official website

Engine 1 fire station for the SVFD.

The Spokane Valley Fire Department (SVFD) is a department in the U.S. state of Washington that provides fire protection, rescue services, emergency medical assistance, and hazardous materials responses in Spokane Valley (including Spokane Valley, Liberty Lake, Millwood and other unincorporated parts of Spokane County). It was formed in 1940 as Spokane County Fire Protection District 1. The department initially started with three leased fire engines and a simple fire station. In 2007 it took on its present name of Spokane Valley Fire Department. As of 2020, the department has ten fire stations and 200 employees. They answer over 18,000 calls a year.
