= Dishman Hills =

Mountains in Washington (state), United States

Coordinates: 47°38′48″N 117°17′13″W

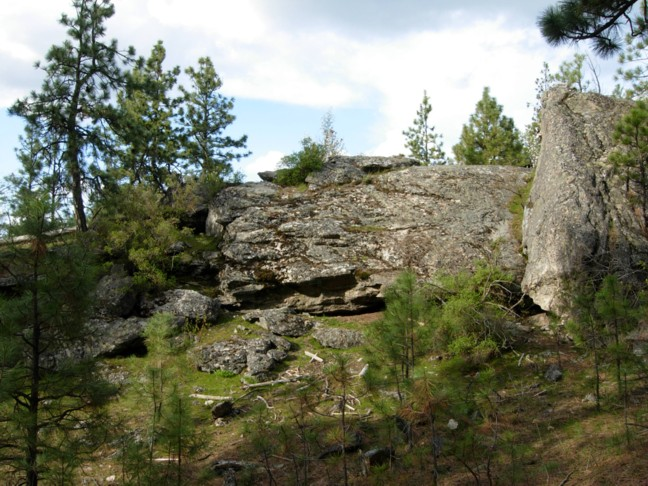
A granite outcrop in Dishman Hills

Dishman Hills Natural Resources Conservation Area is a 530-acre (210 ha) area protected by a combination of public and non-profit groups, including the Spokane County Parks and Recreation Department, the Washington Department of Natural Resources, the Inland Northwest Land Conservancy, and the Dishman Hills Conservancy. It is located in Spokane County, Washington. The granite outcroppings forming the bulk of the area were originally formed approximately 70 million years ago by volcanic magma pushing up through the Earth's crust and then cooling. The area's rugged, potholed appearance and deep gullies are a result of the Missoula Floods. It represents one of the most ecologically diverse regions in Washington state, where forests, grasslands, and shrublands converge, and sits within two ecoregions: the Okanagan and the Canadian Rocky Mountains ecoregions. The hills consist of small ravines, ponds, and large chunks of granite that support an ecosystem consisting mainly of ponderosa pine, as well as about 300 different flowering plants (including Indian Camas) and 73 different species of mushrooms.

The area also supports wildlife, including coyotes, marmots, white-tailed deer, pheasants, weasels, squirrels, chipmunks, porcupines, cottontail rabbits, raptors, ruffed grouse, and more than 50 species of butterflies. The Dishman Hills rise immediately south of the Dishman section of Spokane Valley. Continuing south, out of the park, the elevation continues to rise to the Rocks of Sharon and the Iller Creek Conservation Area near the peak of Krell Hill.

== History and conservation ==
The Dishman Hills Conservancy was founded in March 1966 by a group of local conservationists led by Tom Rogers, a biology teacher at University High School, originally under the name Dishman Hills Natural Area Association. It is the oldest land trust in Washington state. The goal of its founders was to purchase conservation land for recreation and education to ensure that the Hills would remain protected and open for public access in perpetuity.

Beginning in 1966, land was purchased and donated by the Dishman Hills Conservancy to protect the hills from urban sprawl and development. The Washington Department of Natural Resources subsequently designated the area a Natural Resources Conservation Area in recognition of its unique geological history and biological qualities. The area is jointly managed by three landowners — the Washington Department of Natural Resources, Spokane County Parks and Recreation, and the Dishman Hills Conservancy — who collaborate rather than managing separate parcels independently.

The Dishman Hills Conservancy's mission is to permanently protect the Dishman Hills while connecting people to nature through conservation, education, recreation, and stewardship. The conservancy has a broader goal of connecting the existing conservation areas to create an extensive wildlife corridor between Spokane and Spokane Valley, with plans to add over 1,000 acres to the protected area.

== Geology ==
The granite outcroppings of the Dishman Hills were formed approximately 70 million years ago when volcanic magma pushed upward through the Earth's crust and cooled slowly below the surface, forming the granite intrusions now exposed at the surface. The landscape was subsequently shaped by the Missoula Floods, a series of catastrophic glacial outburst floods that occurred approximately 17,000 years ago when the ice dam holding back Glacial Lake Missoula gave way, releasing floodwaters that swept across what is now the Rathdrum Prairie and carved the rugged, potholed terrain visible today. Evidence from exposed weathered rock suggests the floodwaters overflowed the crest of the ridge separating the Spokane Valley from the Palouse at approximately 2,800 feet, before continuing south toward the Pacific Ocean.

The Washington Geological Survey has featured the Dishman Hills as one of 100 notable places to experience Washington's geology on public lands, noting its distinctive combination of ancient granite and flood-sculpted terrain.

== Trails and recreation ==
The area features a main loop trail of 1.5 miles in length, with additional trails connected to the main loop. The area has six main trailheads providing a variety of hiking opportunities to observe the region's unique wildlife, geology, and plant species. Camp Caro, a Spokane County park at the north end of the Dishman Hills, serves as a starting point for outdoor education classes. A Discover Pass is required for parking at some access points.

Each spring, the Dishman Hills Conservancy sponsors an annual buttercup hike. The conservancy also offers guided hikes, philosophy walks, yoga sessions, and a Kids in the Hills program offering hands-on activities for elementary-age students. Volunteer opportunities include trail maintenance, planting trees, installing signage, and serving as volunteer stewards who assist the public and monitor trail conditions.

== Valley View Fire ==
On Thursday, July 10, 2008, at approximately 3:30 PM local time, the Valley View Fire started in the Dishman Hills area. By the following morning it had burned 1,200 acres (4.9 km^{2}) and destroyed 11 homes. Washington State Governor Chris Gregoire declared a state of emergency for Spokane County. A mandatory evacuation was ordered in the area and two emergency shelters were set up around Spokane Valley.

The fire originated from a smoldering pit fire made by a resident of South Eastern Lane. The smoldering fire had been started several days before and was left unattended inside an old tree stump before being re-ignited by strong winds on the afternoon of July 10. Those winds spread the fire rapidly across the Dishman Hills and threatened hundreds of homes along Dishman-Mica Road. Many homes in the Park Drive area, located between the fire's origin and the Dishman Hills Natural Area, were in the direct path of the fire. Contributing factors in the spread of the fire included the high wind speeds and the quantity of dry natural fuel present in the area.
