= University High School (Washington) =

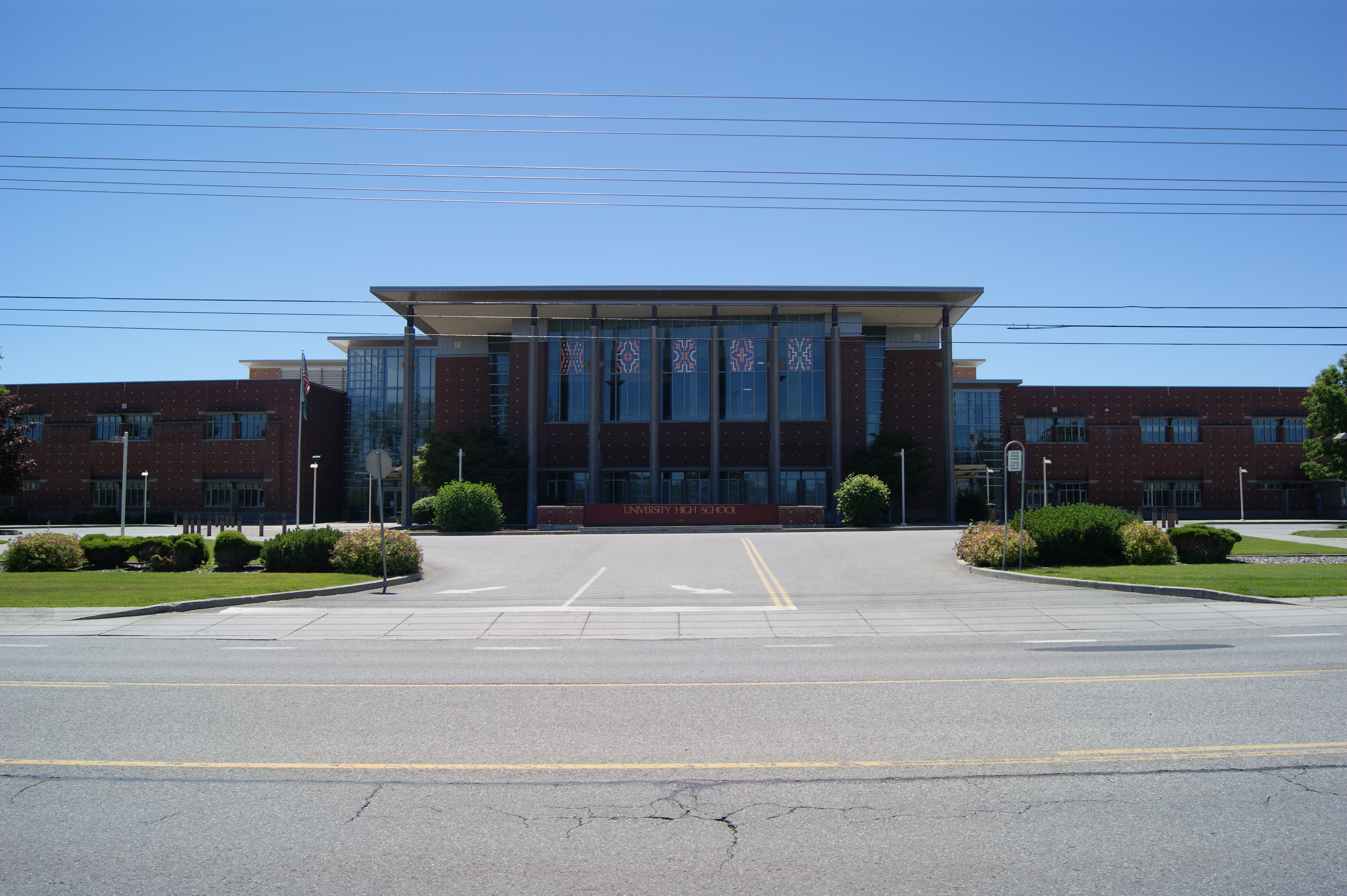
- University High School from 32nd Avenue

Location
- 12420 East 32nd Avenue; Spokane Valley, Washington 99216; United States; 47°37′38″N 117°14′12″W

Information
- Type: Public
- Established: 1960
- School district: Central Valley School District
- Superintendent: John Parker
- NCES School ID: 530111000204
- Principal: Rob Bartlett
- Staff: 80.10 (FTE)
- Faculty: 103
- Grades: 9–12
- Enrollment: 1,445 (2022-23)
- Student to teacher ratio: 18.04
- Campus: Suburban
- Colors: Crimson and Gold
- Nickname: U-High
- Team name: Titans
- Rival: Central Valley High School
- Yearbook: Kronos
- Website: uhs.cvsd.org

University High School, often referred to as "U-Hi" or "U-High", is a public high school for grades nine through twelve in Spokane Valley, Washington, United States. It is part of the Central Valley School District in Spokane Valley.

In late 2002, the school campus moved approximately 2 miles (3.2 km) to its current location. The current building is capable of housing around 1650 students. Because of the growing number of students attending, U-High is no longer accepting additional students, and many of the teachers must trade classrooms during the day.

== Facility ==
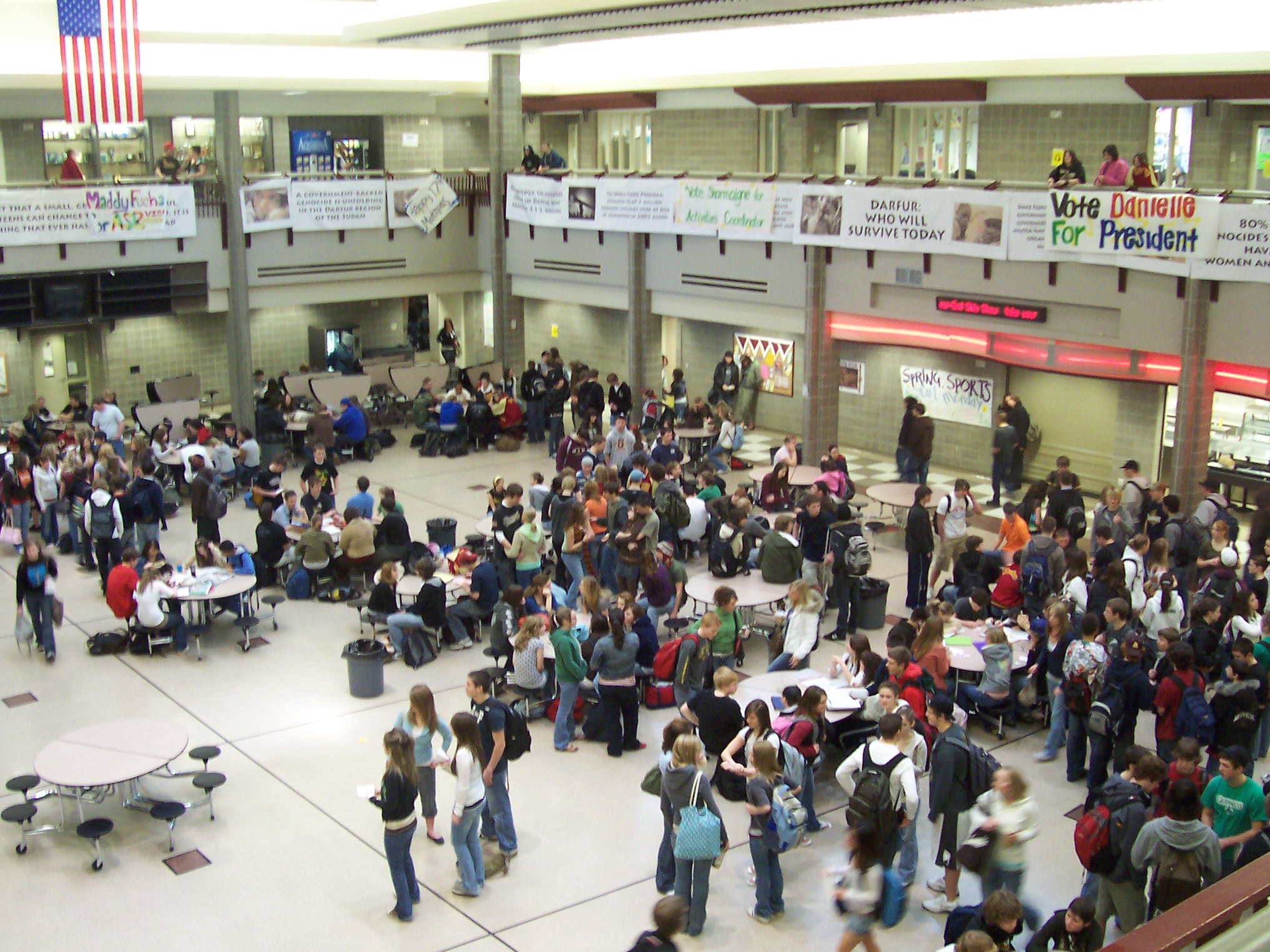
The commons, which also serves as the cafeteria

Aerial view of the U-High campus

The building opened in late 2002, and has 240,000 square feet (22,000 m^{2}) of space sits on a 44-acre (18 ha) site. The school has 75 teaching stations divided among general classrooms, business, science, art, music, professional-technical and health/fitness areas. The commons/cafeteria area accommodates 800 students for lunch and is a multipurpose area that can also be used for dances and large gatherings. The theater seats 575 and is used for music concerts, drama productions and guest speakers. The gym seats 2,030 for athletic contests.

== Schedule ==
University High School switched from a trimester system to a semester system in 2010. One semester is 90 days, and each class is 0.5 credit. There are six classes a day; on Mondays, Wednesdays, and Fridays, students attend TAP (Titan Advisory Period). This is a time when students can do homework, and it also serves as a sort of 'homeroom', even though it follows 1st period. Students take the HSPE (High School Proficiency Exam) during this class (TAP is extended during HSPE week), and seniors finish their senior projects during this time as well. Additionally, students register for their next year in TAP, and other various school-related activities occur during this time, such as assemblies. TAP has the same students with the same teacher for all four years of high school. Regular classes are 50 minutes long and TAP is 25 minutes long.

=== Hours ===
On Mondays, Wednesdays, and Fridays, classes are from 7:40 to 2:15. On Tuesdays and Thursdays, there is Student Access Time from 7:35 to 8:15, and classes start at 8:15 and end at 2:15. Student Access Time has two purposes: one purpose is Teacher Collaboration time, and the other purpose is a time for students to meet with their teachers to get help either on homework or classwork.

== Classes and curriculum ==
University contains a wide variety of classes available to students. Certain classes are required throughout each year, while other classes are optional.

Math: Until recently, University had used a math curriculum known as "CMIC." This took students from basic algebra to Pre-Calculus, extending from Freshmen to Senior year. New curriculum is currently being implemented. Special math classes are also available for students who need it, and those who fail the math WASL (Washington Assessment of Student Learning) take additional math classes.

Language: Basic language classes are offered at the school. When a student reaches their junior year (or in rare cases, their sophomore year), they may take AP (Advanced Placement) classes for language and composition.

Foreign Language: Spanish and French are offered, as well as American Sign Language.

History: The school requires its students to take global studies; in later years, they may sign up for history or AP U.S. history. During senior year, students can take AP European History.

Health: Both health and fitness classes are available, some mandatory and others optional.

Arts: The school offers band, drama, choir, painting, calligraphy, pottery, and drawing.

CTE: "Career and Technical Education" There are 4 specific areas for a career choice. They include: business, auto tech, communications, and cooking classes

== Band/Orchestra ==
Musical classes and programs vary from concert band to wind ensemble to jazz band to pep band, along with marching band. The University Marching band has won a national title (Bands of America, Summer 1983) and consistently makes finals in its various competitions.

== Sports ==
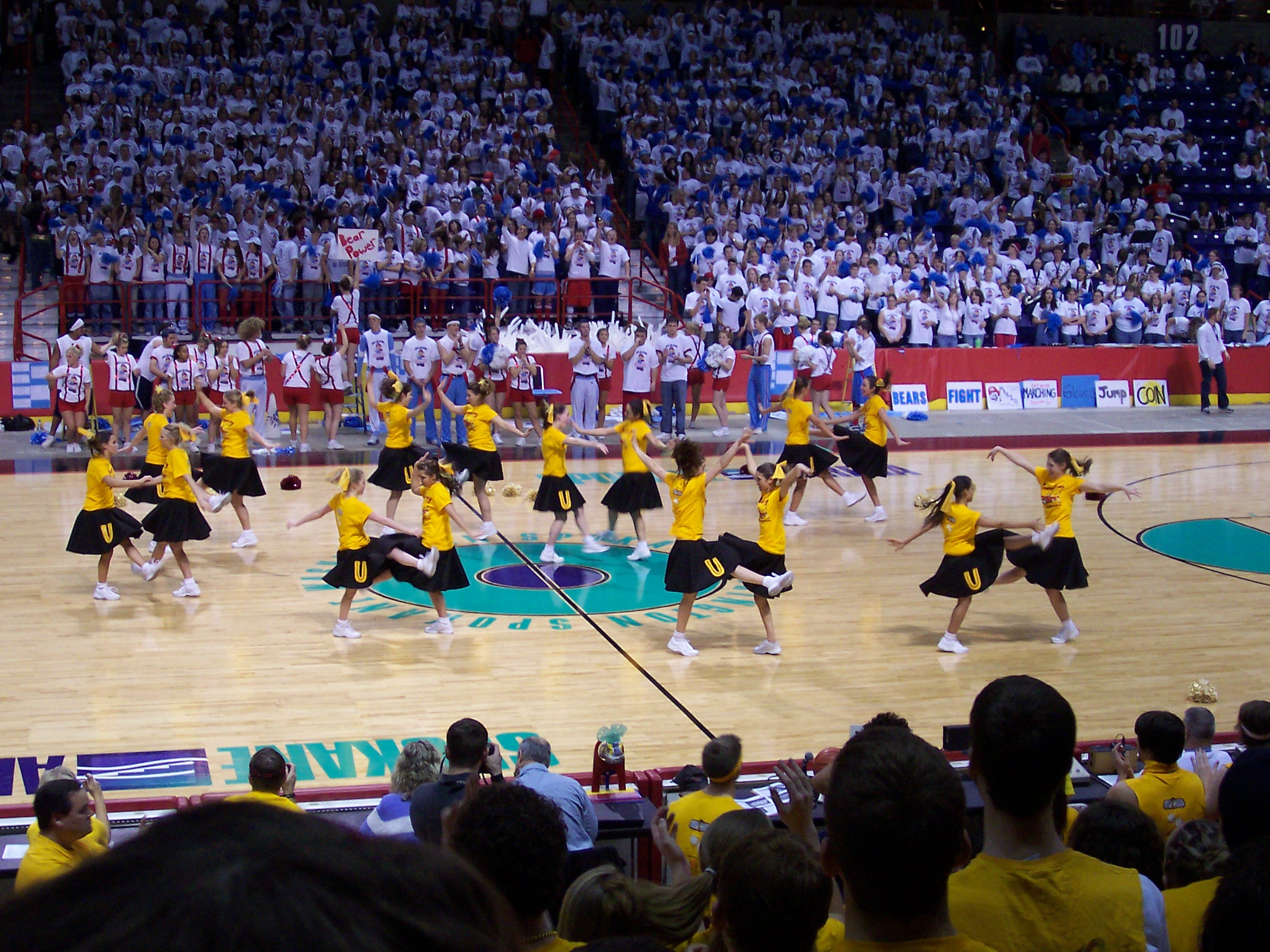
Stinky Sneaker Half-Time Show (theme: Shoe-Wop-a-Doo-Wop, 50's)

Aerial view of the U-High football field

Sports at University High School include: baseball, boys and girls basketball, cheerleading, boys and girls cross country, dance team, football, boys and girls golf, gymnastics, boys and girls soccer, fastpitch softball, slowpitch softball, boys and girls tennis, boys and girls track, volleyball, and wrestling.

=== Stinky Sneaker ===
Central Valley High School is U-High's rival. Most of the sports events against them have names and are a major part of the school tradition. The most-attended competition, the Stinky Sneaker, had to be moved to the Spokane Arena to accommodate the number of students and teachers present. Almost the entire population of both schools attend this basketball game. The prize is the Stinky Sneaker, an old shoe painted half crimson and gold and half blue and white. The second most-attended CV-U-High sporting event is the football game between the two schools, called the Greasy Pig. The third most-attended match is the wrestling match, called the Battle of the Bone. The soccer game is called the Muddy Cleat, and most of the other sports have names for their CV-U-High rivalry games.

=== State championships ===
1992 Girls Cross Country
1997 Boys Cross Country
1998 Boys Cross Country
1998 Boys Track
1999 Boys Cross Country
1999 Boys Track
2003 Fastpitch Softball
2005 Wrestling
2010 Wrestling
2013 Wrestling

== Notable faculty and alumni ==
- Jeff Schmedding, college football coach for the Auburn Tigers
- Zack Davisson, writer and translator
- Chad Carpenter, Head Coach Snow College Softball Program
- Brett Bailey (basketball), former professional basketball player
- Angie Bjorklund, basketball player, Tennessee Lady Vols all-time 3-pointers record holder with 300 made
- Joe Dahl, professional football player for Detroit Lions
- Tyler Olson, professional baseball player, pitcher for Cleveland Indians
- Brad Walker, pole vaulter, world champion and American record holder
- Michael Conklin, mathematics teacher, recipient of 2015 Presidential Award for Excellence in Mathematics and Science Teaching for Washington State
- Roger D. Carstens, Special Presidential Envoy For Hostage Affairs
