= Dishman Art Museum =

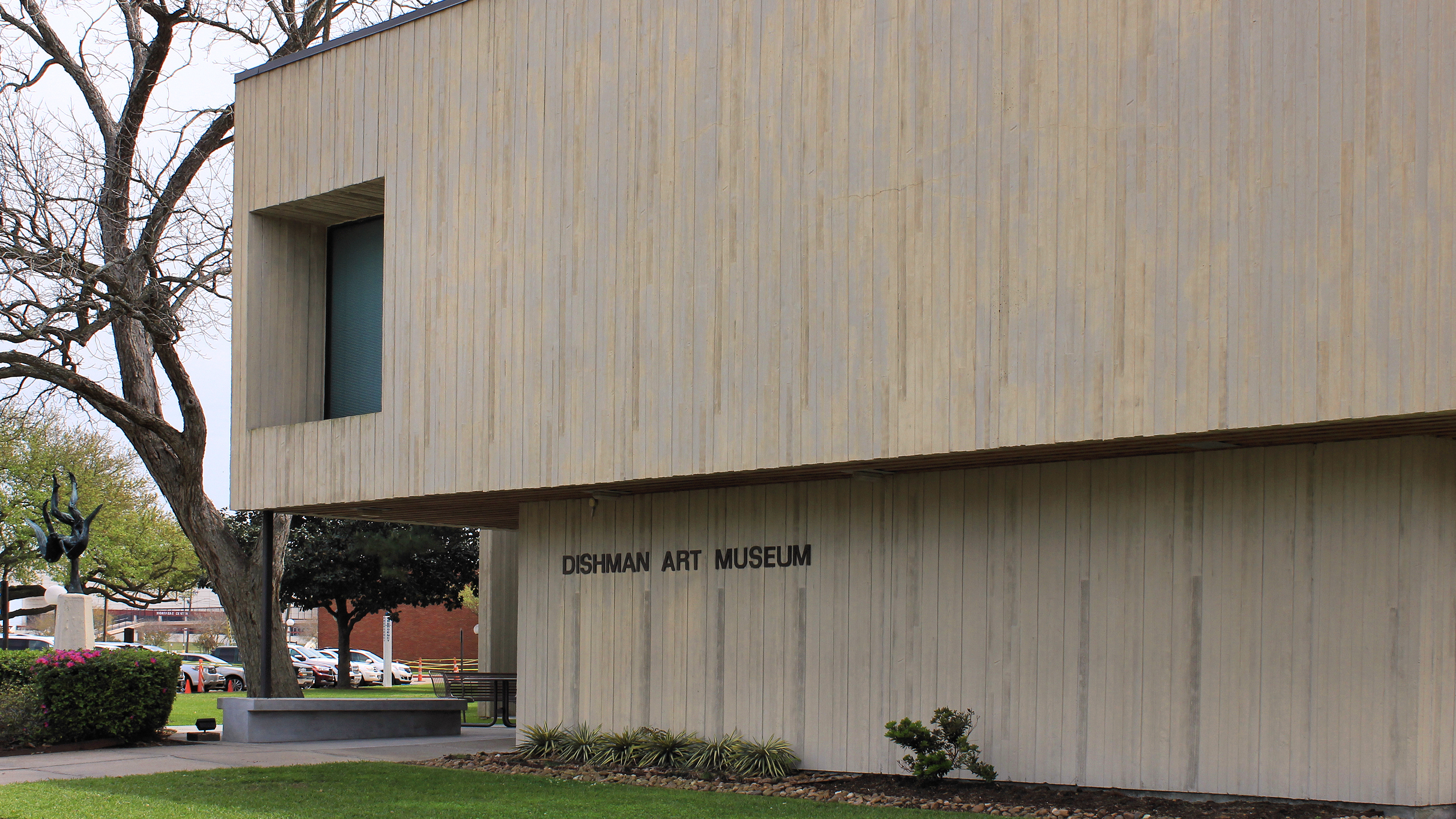

- Beaumont, Texas
- Former name: Dishman Art Gallery
- Established: 1983
- Location: 1030 East Lavaca Street, Beaumont, TX 77705
- Coordinates: 30°02′46.4″N 94°04′32.7″W
- Type: Art Museum
- Collections: Eisenstadt Collection of Academic Painting and Decorative Arts; Nicklos Collection; Petrutsas Collection; Maudee Carron Papers; Jerry Newman Papers; Modern and contemporary art
- Founders: Dr. Lynne Lokensgard (founding director), Herb and Kate Dishman, campaign organizers
- Director: Dennis Kiel
- Owner: Lamar University
- Public transit access: (BMT) Route 7 -Virginia and Rolfe Christopher
- Parking: Free, Parking area C-5, Lamar University
- Website: fineartscomm.lamar.edu/dishman-art-museum/

The Dishman Art Museum (previously known as the Dishman Art Gallery) is an art museum on the campus of Lamar University in Beaumont, Texas. Admission to the museum is completely free; the gallery is open from 8 a.m. - 5 p.m., Monday - Friday. The museum also serves as a teaching facility in the Art Department at Lamar University. Exhibitions change monthly. The gallery features one-person exhibition of contemporary artists, group exhibitions of contemporary artists, Art Department faculty shows, graduating senior shows, a national competition (The Dishman Competition), artist-in-residency, Grand Bal (annual art auction), and High School Scholarship exhibitions. There are three gallery spaces - Upper Gallery, Lower Gallery, and the Heinz and Ruth Eisenstadt Collection which consists of 150 19th-century paintings and 250 porcelains and objets d'art. The exhibition space totals 6,000 square feet (560 m^{2}).

== History ==
The museum was established in 1983 through a private donation from local art patrons and philanthropists Herb and Kate Dishman. Architect Marvin Gordy designed the building with Upper and Lower Gallery exhibition spaces, offices and a lecture hall. To realize the grand scope of this building, further financial support was necessary. The Dishmans presented a challenge grant, asking the community to match their donation. Several members of the community met that challenge permitting the completion of the building. In 2003, the building was officially renamed the Dishman Art Museum to reach a larger audience in the Southeast Texas community.

== Permanent Collections ==
=== Eisenstadt Collection ===
- Paintings: 147 paintings by European and American artists ranging from the seventeenth through the twentieth century.
- Porcelains: 200 19th- and 20th-century porcelains from Sèvres, France, and Meissen and Dresden, Germany.
- Objets d’art: enamel, cloisonne, silver and ivory objects.
- Sculptures: six bronze and one marble 19th-century figurative pieces.
- Furniture: a 15-piece dining room suite and eight curio cabinets.
- Carpets: four modern oriental style carpets.

=== Robert Willis Print Collection ===
Bob Willis donated his collection of prints to the Dishman Art Museum in 1995. Willis, who took classes in the Department of Art as a retiree, was an avid collector of the arts. The collection includes 50 prints from European and American artists of the late 19th and early 20th centuries. All print processes are represented in this collection and many of the works are from the formative years of European abstractionism. Artists include Matisse, Braque, Kandinsky and Miró; styles include naturalism, abstraction and non-objectivity.

=== Tribal Art Collection from Africa, New Guinea and Pre-Columbian Mexico ===
The Tribal Art Collection was given to the museum the year it opened its doors in 1983. It consists of three private collections given to Lamar by Houston collectors. All three of the collections represent classic examples of tribal art from three regions of the world. Wooden carved shields from New Guinea, ceramic vessels and figures from Mexico and 19th century masks from Africa are the most outstanding pieces in this collection, totaling 45 pieces.
