= Dishman (surname) =

Dishman is a surname. Notable people with the surname include:

- Chris Dishman (born 1974), American football player
- Cris Dishman (born 1965), American football player and coach
- Edward F. Dishman (1868–1951), American newspaperman and public official
- Glenn Dishman (born 1970), American baseball player and coach
- Jodi W. Dishman (born 1979), American judge
