= Trentwood, Washington =

- Locale
- Location of Trentwood, Washington
- Coordinates: 47°41′59″N 117°12′39″W
- Country: United States
- State: Washington
- County: Spokane

Area
  - Total: 1.8 sq mi (4.6 km^{2})
  - Land: 1.8 sq mi (4.6 km^{2})
  - Water: 0 sq mi (0.0 km^{2})
- Elevation: 2,028 ft (618 m)

Population (2000)
  - Total: 4,388
  - Density: 2,482/sq mi (958.4/km^{2})
- Time zone: UTC-8 (Pacific (PST))
  - Summer (DST): UTC-7 (PDT)
- FIPS code: 53-72310
- GNIS feature ID: 1512737

Trentwood is a locale and former census-designated place (CDP) in Spokane County, Washington, United States, east across the Spokane River from Irwin. The population was 4,388 at the 2000 census. Trentwood joined the other unincorporated communities in the region to form the city of Spokane Valley in 2003.

== History ==
Trentwood was originally called East Trent because of its position across the Spokane River from Irwin, formerly named Trent. Rather than a centralized town, East Trent was a loose collection of communities including a rail station named Steno, after a local court stenographer, and Trentwood Orchards, so named because of an economy of lumber and fruit trees. In 1917, after the stenographer died as well as many of the fruit trees, the railroad and communities came together under the name Trentwood.

== Geography ==
Trentwood is located at 47°41′59″N 117°12′39″W (47.699595, -117.210791).

According to the United States Census Bureau, the CDP had a total area of 1.8 square miles (4.7 km^{2}), of which, 1.8 square miles (4.7 km^{2}) is land and 0.56% is water.

== Demographics ==
As of the census of 2000, there were 4,388 people, 1,546 households, and 1,179 families residing in the CDP. The population density was 2,482.2 per square mile (958.4/km^{2}). There were 1,632 housing units at an average density of 923.2 per square mile (356.4/km^{2}). The racial makeup of the CDP was 92.68% White, 0.71% African American, 1.07% Native American, 2.71% Asian, 0.11% Pacific Islander, 0.71% from other races, and 2.01% from two or more races. Hispanic or Latino of any race were 2.39% of the population.

There were 1,546 households, out of which 42.6% had children under the age of 18 living with them, 57.2% were married couples living together, 13.8% had a female householder with no husband present, and 23.7% were non-families. 18.2% of all households were made up of individuals, and 4.4% had someone living alone who was 65 years of age or older. The average household size was 2.82 and the average family size was 3.20.

In the CDP, the age distribution of the population shows 31.1% under the age of 18, 8.5% from 18 to 24, 31.4% from 25 to 44, 21.9% from 45 to 64, and 7.2% who were 65 years of age or older. The median age was 34 years. For every 100 females, there were 104.2 males. For every 100 females age 18 and over, there were 100.9 males.

The median income for a household in the CDP was $41,128, and the median income for a family was $45,455. Males had a median income of $31,968 versus $25,368 for females. The per capita income for the CDP was $16,566. About 7.9% of families and 8.6% of the population were below the poverty line, including 8.3% of those under age 18 and 14.1% of those age 65 or over.
