= Central Valley High School (Washington) =

- Central Valley High School facility

Location
- 821 S. Sullivan Rd. Spokane Valley, Washington; United States; 47°38′58″N 117°11′37″W

Information
- Type: Public High School
- Established: January 1927; 99 years ago
- School district: Central Valley School District
- Superintendent: John Parker
- NCES School ID: 530111000191
- Dean: Owen Jones
- Principal: Katie Louie
- Campus Director: Robin Barnhart
- Teaching staff: 61.60 (on an FTE basis)
- Grades: 9–12
- Enrollment: 1,336 (2023-2024)
- Student to teacher ratio: 21.69
- Colors: Columbia Blue & White
- Athletics: WIAA Class 3A, Greater Spokane League
- Mascot: Bears
- Nickname: CV
- Rival: University High School
- Yearbook: Voyager
- Website: cvhs.cvsd.org

Aerial view of the campus and facilities at CV

Central Valley High School, often referred to as "CV", is a high school located in Spokane Valley, Washington. Central Valley is one of the three high schools in Central Valley School District #356.

== History ==
Central Valley High School was originally built in 1927 where Greenacres Middle School currently sits.

== Athletics ==
=== Football ===
Aerial view of the football field at CV

In the 2000-2001 season the CV Bears became state champions after beating South Kitsap in the Tacoma Dome on 12/6/2001 under the direction of their long time coach Rick Giampietri. They made the playoffs in the 1982–1983, 1983–1984, 1995–1996, 2008–2009, and the 2011–2012 seasons but they fell short of the state title in each occasion.

=== Women's Basketball ===
The Central Valley Women's Basketball team has won six state titles, all in the 4A Class. Their first came in the 1992–1993 season when they beat Snohomish on 3/13/93 by a score of 44–35.

They then went to the playoffs eight years in a row from the 1996–1997 season through the 2003–2004 season, winning two more state championships in the 2000–2001 season and 2001–2002 season by beating Redmond 71–48 on 3/10/2001 and Prairie 61–43 on 3/9/2002.

Central Valley made the playoff five years in a row from 2015-2016 season through 2019-2020 season, winning three more state championships in the 2015-2016 season, 2017-2018 season and the 2019-2020 season by beating Snohomish 57-48 on 3/5/2016, Woodinville 70-39 on 3/3/2018, and Woodinville 59-55 on 3/7/2020.

Central Valley won the GEICO National Championship in 2018, beating Hamilton Heights (Chattanooga, Tennessee) by a score of 66–61.

=== Men's Basketball ===
The CV Men's Basketball team has been to the playoffs 24 times in their history, winning their only state title in the 1967–1968 season by beating Lincoln 62–48 on 3/23/1968.

=== Women's Soccer ===
The CV Women's Soccer team has been to the playoffs nine times winning two state championships in the 2013–2014 season and the 2014–2015 season beating Issaquah 3–2 on 11/23/2013 and beating Jackson 5–2 in the 2014–2015 season.

=== Wrestling ===
The CV Wrestling team has been to the playoffs 16 times winning their only state title in the 1997–1998 season.

=== Cross Country ===
The CV Cross Country team has experienced success in recent years. In 2006, the Bears placed at state for the first time in over 40 years, and earned a ranking as 24th in the nation on Harrier's Super 25. The team won their first WIAA State Cross Country Meet in 2012. Since then, an incoming freshman team in 2015 seemed to breathe life back into the team. The new freshman class was ranked second in the nation. They have placed second back-to-back at the WIAA State Cross Country Meet in 2016 and 2017. After placing second in second in 2017, they proceeded to win NIKE Cross Regionals and advanced to nationals. The team has produced two state champions: Pete Whitford in 1968 and Ryan Kline in 2017.

=== Track and Field ===
The CV track and field team has been in existence since 1925 before area schools combined to make-up Central Valley High School. The Boys team has complied 24 district championships, 12 regional championship, and placed 2nd 1936, 4th 1944, 5th 2008, 4th 2022, 2nd 2024, at the state team championships. Individually CV has had 12 state champions and two national champions. The Girls team has complied 11 district championships, 4 regional championships, and placed 8th 1980, 3rd 1981, 8th 2014, 6th 2015, 4th 2016, 4th 2017, 5th 2018, 5th 2019 at the state team championships. Individually CV girls have had 7 state champions since offering girls track in 1975.

== Notable alumni ==
- Chuck Bennett, class of 1966, Mayor of Salem, Oregon; former Oregon State Representative
- Will Davis, class of 2008, former NFL cornerback for the Ravens
- Mike Hollis, class of 1990, Former NFL placekicker for Jacksonville Jaguars
- Lexie Hull, class of 2018, WNBA American professional basketball player for the Indiana Fever
- Tyler Johnson, class of 2009, NHL forward for the Chicago Blackhawks
- Jeff Jordan, class of 1963, NFL running back for Los Angeles Rams
- Bob Keppel, class of 1962, King County homicide detective, track down serial killers Ted Bundy and Gary Ridgway. High School State High Jump Champion, At Washington State University he won a Pac-8 championship. Olympic Trials 1968.
- Ryan Looney, class of 1994, Head Men's Basketball Coach at Idaho State University
- Austin Rehkow, class of 2013, former NFL punter for New York Giants
- Ryan Rehkow, class of 2017, NFL punter for the Cincinnati Bengals
- Troy Robertson, class of 1979, American photographer and reality television star that competed on Survivor: One World, Survivor: Game Changers
- Kevin Stocker, class of 1988, former MLB shortstop for the Philadelphia Phillies, Tampa Bay Devil Rays, and Anaheim Angels
- Scott Wise, class of 1978, winner of the 1989 Tony Award for Best Featured Actor in a Musical

== See also ==
- Education in Spokane, Washington
