= Spokane Valley, Washington =

- City
- Spokane Valley City Hall

- Logo
- Nickname: The Valley
- Motto: "A community of opportunity where individuals and families can grow and play, and businesses will flourish and prosper."
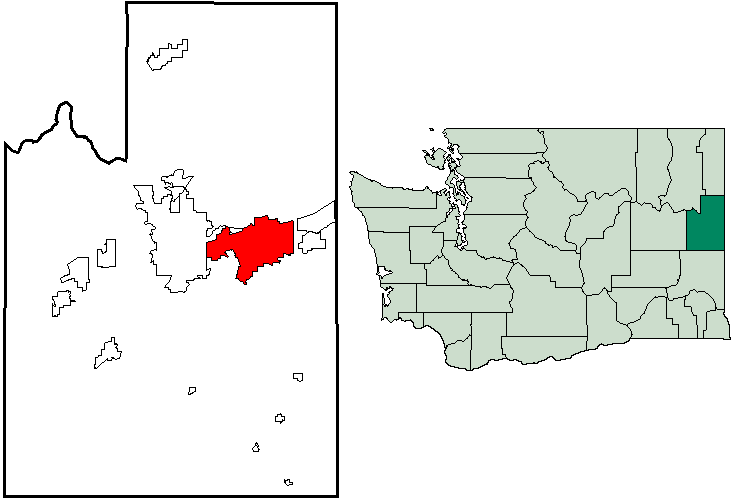
- Coordinates: 47°37′50″N 117°15′42″W
- Country: United States
- State: Washington
- County: Spokane
- Settled: 1849
- Incorporated: March 31, 2003
- Named for: Spokane Valley

Government
  - Type: Council–manager
  - Body: Spokane Valley City Council
  - City manager: John Hohman
  - Mayor: Pam Haley
  - Deputy mayor: Tim Hattenburg

Area
  - City: 38.01 sq mi (98.44 km^{2})
  - Land: 37.72 sq mi (97.69 km^{2})
  - Water: 0.29 sq mi (0.75 km^{2})
- Elevation: 2,038 ft (621 m)

Population (2020)
  - City: 102,976
  - Estimate (2024): 108,267
  - Rank: US: 300th WA: 8th
  - Density: 2,679.2/sq mi (1,034.46/km^{2})
  - Urban: 447,279 (US: 90th)
  - Metro: 597,919 (US: 97th)
  - CSA: 781,497 (US: 70th)
- Time zone: UTC-8 (Pacific (PST))
  - Summer (DST): UTC-7 (PDT)
- ZIP Code: 99206, 99216, 99212, 99016, 99027, 99037
- Area code: 509
- FIPS code: 53-67167
- GNIS feature ID: 2411957
- Website: spokanevalleywa.gov

Spokane Valley is a city in Spokane County, Washington, United States, and the largest suburb of Spokane. It is located east of Spokane, west of Coeur d'Alene, Idaho, and surrounds the city of Millwood on three sides. The city incorporated as the City of Spokane Valley on March 31, 2003. The population was 102,976 at the 2020 census, making it the ninth-most populous city in Washington State. Spokane Valley is named after the valley of the Spokane River, in which it is located. The city and the general area is colloquially referred to as "The Valley" by residents of the Spokane–Coeur d'Alene area.

Spokane Valley hosts a variety of community events such as the Spokane County Interstate Fair, Valleyfest, and the Inland Northwest Craft Beer Festival and is home to the Spokane Valley Heritage Museum and the home ground of the Spokane Indians minor league baseball team.

== History ==
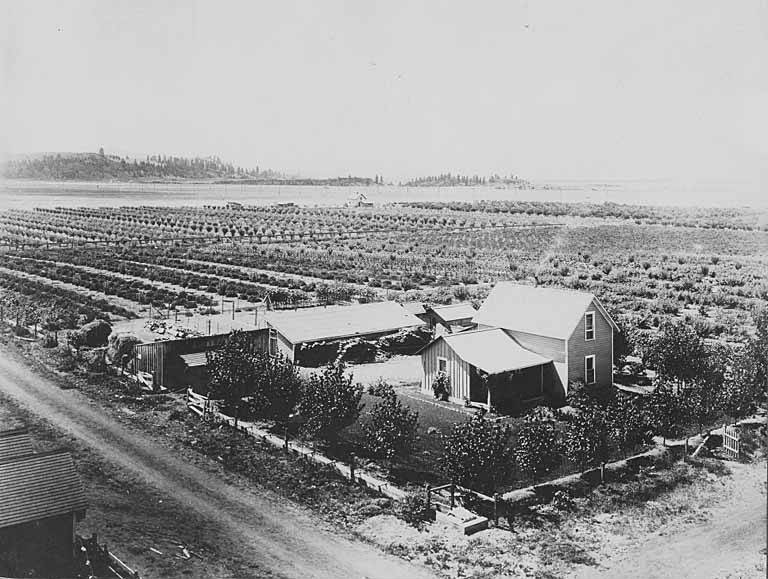
Orchard in Greenacres, c. 1903

The City of Spokane Valley incorporated on March 31, 2003. At its creation, it was the third-largest newly incorporated city in US history (after Centennial, Colorado, which incorporated in 2001; and Miami Gardens, Florida, which incorporated about five weeks before Spokane Valley).

The city formed from combining the urbanized unincorporated areas east of Spokane City, including census-designated places (CDPs) of Dishman, Opportunity, Trentwood, Veradale, part of Greenacres, and East Spokane. The new city boundaries did not include the incorporated areas such as Millwood and Liberty Lake, nor the protected areas such as the Dishman Hills Natural Area. It was initially delayed by a petition from Spokane, because it included the Yardley industrial area, to which Spokane had already extended utilities, and had plans to annex. Prior to the successful vote May 21, 2002, there had been four failed attempts to form a city in the Valley. The main arguments for incorporation centered around increased voice in local governance and the threat of annexation by the City of Spokane. The main arguments against incorporation included contentment with Spokane County provided services and the threat of increased taxes and bureaucracy by the new city. Both sides claimed their opponents' arguments were entirely untrue scare tactics.

== Geography ==
According to the United States Census Bureau, the city has a total area of 38.06 square miles (98.57 km^{2}), of which 37.77 square miles (97.82 km^{2}) is land and 0.29 square miles (0.75 km^{2}) is water. Water features in the city include Shelley Lake, a small lake which is fed by the Saltese Creek.

The City of Spokane Valley lies along the banks of the Spokane River as it flows from its source in Lake Coeur d'Alene on its way to the Columbia River at the Franklin D. Roosevelt Lake reservoir. The city lies along both banks of the river, but most of the city lies to the south of the river. To the south of the valley in which the city sits is the southern extent of the Selkirk Mountains, which are most prominent in the area east of Coeur d'Alene. The valley is within the Northern Rockies Level III ecoregion. The valley exhibits signs of the prehistoric geologic events that shaped the area and region such as the Missoula Floods which ended 12,000 to 15,000 years ago. The Spokane valley was gouged out by repeated failures in the ice dam that held Glacial Lake Missoula.

The city limits are roughly defined to the west and southwest by Havana Street and the Dishman Hills Conservation Area; to the north by Felts Field, the City of Millwood, the Spokane River, and a few minor roads north of the river; to the east by Barker Road; and to the south by the small hills which divide the city from the Palouse region.

The city of Spokane Valley is part of the Spokane–Coeur d'Alene Combined Statistical Area (CSA) and lies between the two anchor cities, directly east of Spokane and to the west of Coeur d'Alene. The city is also part of the wider Inland Northwest region, consisting of eastern Washington, northern Idaho, northwestern Montana, and northeastern Oregon.

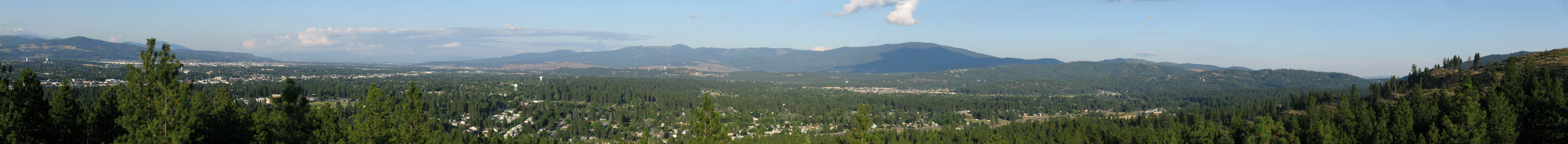
Panorama of Spokane Valley looking east from Eagle Peak

=== Neighborhoods and communities ===
Prior to World War II, Spokane Valley had been a predominantly rural area, a productive site for farms and orchards since it was first irrigated in 1895. In 1940, the population of the valley was 10,000. During World War II, with increased industrial activity in the central business district, particularly the railroads, new migrants to the Spokane area began to settle, shop, and do business in outlying areas where it was more quiet and less crowded and blighted. In 1960 the population of the valley was about 45,000 and by 1970 it had become a suburb of 60,000 residents. The City of Spokane Valley incorporated in 2003, centered around the historic communities of Opportunity, Dishman, and Veradale and including the communities of Greenacres, Trentwood, Yardley, and Chester, forging together an assemblage of small townships, mercantile hubs, and unincorporated communities. Because the City of Spokane Valley shares its name with the unincorporated area it was carved from, the term "Spokane Valley" is often used in reference to an area greater than that defined by the city limits.

=== Climate ===
Spokane Valley experiences a temperate climate (Köppen Csa), with a warm summer and rainy winter. Precipitation averages just over 16 inches (410 mm) annually, with December averaging the most precipitation with 3.5 inches (89 mm) and July the least with 0.6 inches (15 mm). July is the hottest month of the year, with an average temperature of 73 °F (23 °C) and January is the coldest, with an average temperature of 28.3 °F (−2.1 °C).

Climate data for Spokane (Felts Field) 1998-present normals and extremes
Month	Jan	Feb	Mar	Apr	May	Jun	Jul	Aug	Sep	Oct	Nov	Dec	Year
Record high °F (°C)	59 (15)	60 (16)	77 (25)	87 (31)	95 (35)	113 (45)	112 (44)	112 (44)	102 (39)	86 (30)	69 (21)	63 (17)	113 (45)
Mean maximum °F (°C)	51.5 (10.8)	53.4 (11.9)	64.9 (18.3)	76.2 (24.6)	86.6 (30.3)	93.5 (34.2)	100.3 (37.9)	99.2 (37.3)	90.6 (32.6)	75.3 (24.1)	59.6 (15.3)	51.6 (10.9)	101.9 (38.8)
Mean daily maximum °F (°C)	37.1 (2.8)	42.5 (5.8)	51.0 (10.6)	59.0 (15.0)	68.6 (20.3)	75.2 (24.0)	87.0 (30.6)	85.6 (29.8)	75.6 (24.2)	60.2 (15.7)	44.8 (7.1)	36.6 (2.6)	60.3 (15.7)
Mean daily minimum °F (°C)	26.2 (−3.2)	27.2 (−2.7)	31.7 (−0.2)	36.2 (2.3)	43.3 (6.3)	50.3 (10.2)	56.2 (13.4)	54.8 (12.7)	46.6 (8.1)	37.9 (3.3)	30.6 (−0.8)	25.6 (−3.6)	38.9 (3.8)
Mean minimum °F (°C)	9.3 (−12.6)	13.8 (−10.1)	20.4 (−6.4)	26.8 (−2.9)	32.0 (0.0)	41.3 (5.2)	46.4 (8.0)	45.5 (7.5)	36.0 (2.2)	25.6 (−3.6)	17.1 (−8.3)	9.4 (−12.6)	2.5 (−16.4)
Record low °F (°C)	−10 (−23)	−3 (−19)	2 (−17)	24 (−4)	28 (−2)	37 (3)	39 (4)	40 (4)	26 (−3)	12 (−11)	−2 (−19)	−10 (−23)	−10 (−23)
Average precipitation inches (mm)	1.92 (49)	1.14 (29)	1.91 (49)	1.23 (31)	1.51 (38)	1.66 (42)	0.40 (10)	0.51 (13)	0.61 (15)	1.10 (28)	1.94 (49)	2.31 (59)	16.25 (413)
Source 1:
Source 2:

== Demographics ==
Historical population
Census	Pop.	Note	%±
2000	80,927		—
2010	89,755		10.9%
2020	102,976		14.7%
2024 (est.)	108,267		5.1%
U.S. Decennial Census; 2000 2010 2020

Spokane Valley first appeared as a city in the 2010 U.S. census after being incorporated in 2003 from all or the predominant parts of the deleted Dishman, Greenacres, Opportunity, Trentwood, and Veradale CDPs and additional area.

=== Racial and ethnic composition ===
Spokane Valley, Washington – Racial and ethnic composition Note: the US Census treats Hispanic/Latino as an ethnic category. This table excludes Latinos from the racial categories and assigns them to a separate category. Hispanics/Latinos may be of any race.
Race / Ethnicity (NH = Non-Hispanic)	Pop 2010	Pop 2020	% 2010	% 2020
White alone (NH)	79,467	83,459	88.54%	81.05%
Black or African American alone (NH)	982	1,733	1.09%	1.68%
Native American or Alaska Native alone (NH)	952	1,055	1.06%	1.02%
Asian alone (NH)	1,528	1,912	1.70%	1.86%
Pacific Islander alone (NH)	230	689	0.26%	0.67%
Other race alone (NH)	80	485	0.09%	0.47%
Mixed Race or Multi-Racial (NH)	2,386	6,390	2.66%	6.21%
Hispanic or Latino (any race)	4,130	7,253	4.60%	7.04%
Total	89,755	102,976	100.00%	100.00%

=== 2020 census ===
As of the 2020 census, Spokane Valley had a population of 102,976 and the median age was 38.2 years; 22.3% of residents were under the age of 18 and 17.8% were 65 years of age or older. For every 100 females there were 97.4 males, and for every 100 females age 18 and over there were 94.8 males age 18 and over.

100.0% of residents lived in urban areas, while 0.0% lived in rural areas.

There were 41,821 households in Spokane Valley, of which 28.4% had children under the age of 18 living in them. Of all households, 42.5% were married-couple households, 20.2% were households with a male householder and no spouse or partner present, and 27.9% were households with a female householder and no spouse or partner present. About 30.3% of all households were made up of individuals and 13.1% had someone living alone who was 65 years of age or older. There were 43,751 housing units, of which 4.4% were vacant. The homeowner vacancy rate was 0.8% and the rental vacancy rate was 5.2%.

Racial composition as of the 2020 census
Race	Number	Percent
White	85,722	83.2%
Black or African American	1,812	1.8%
American Indian and Alaska Native	1,322	1.3%
Asian	1,970	1.9%
Native Hawaiian and Other Pacific Islander	710	0.7%
Some other race	2,629	2.6%
Two or more races	8,811	8.6%
Hispanic or Latino (of any race)	7,253	7.0%

=== 2010 census ===
As of the 2010 census, there were 89,755 people, 36,558 households, and 23,119 families residing in the city. The population density was 2,376.4 inhabitants per square mile (917.5/km^{2}). There were 38,851 housing units at an average density of 1,028.6 per square mile (397.1/km^{2}). The racial makeup of the city was 90.9% White, 1.1% African American, 1.2% Native American, 1.7% Asian, 0.3% Pacific Islander, 1.4% from other races, and 3.3% from two or more races. Hispanic or Latino of any race were 4.6% of the population.

There were 36,558 households, of which 31.6% had children under the age of 18 living with them, 45.6% were married couples living together, 12.2% had a female householder with no husband present, 5.4% had a male householder with no wife present, and 36.8% were non-families. 29.0% of all households were made up of individuals, and 11.2% had someone living alone who was 65 years of age or older. The average household size was 2.43 and the average family size was 2.99.

The median age in the city was 37.3 years. 24% of residents were under the age of 18; 9.5% were between the ages of 18 and 24; 26.1% were from 25 to 44; 26.4% were from 45 to 64; and 14.1% were 65 years of age or older. The gender makeup of the city was 48.9% male and 51.1% female.

== Arts and culture ==
=== Places of worship ===
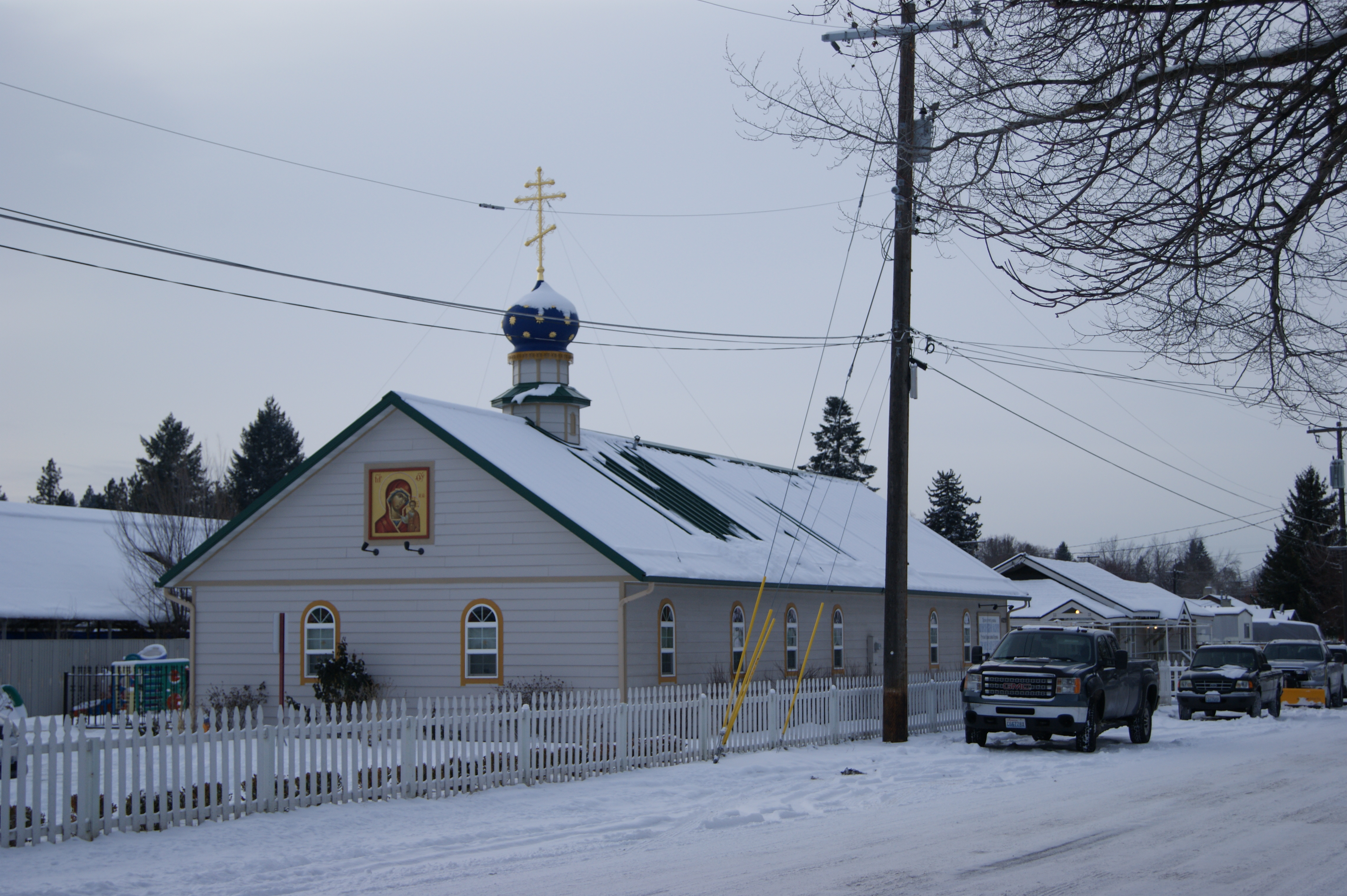
Holy Lady of Kazan Russian Orthodox Church

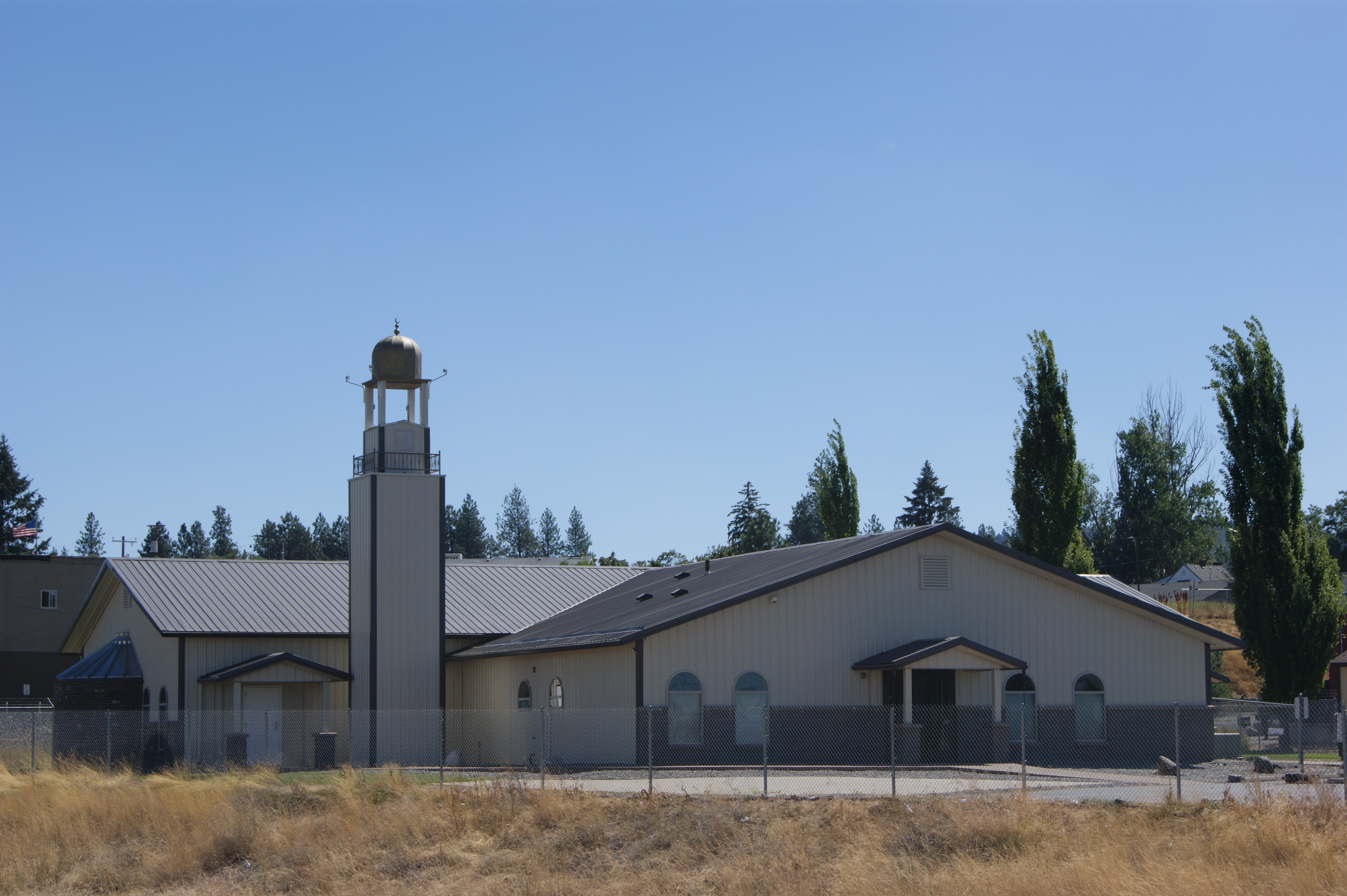
Spokane Islamic Center

The Spokane Islamic Center in Spokane Valley became the first mosque in the Spokane area in 2009. A messianic Jewish synagogue and two Sikh temples are also located in the city.

The greater valley area is also home to the 59th temple of The Church of Jesus Christ of Latter-day Saints, dedicated in 1999, which administers 15 regions across eastern Washington, northern Idaho, and northwestern Montana.

=== Arts and theater ===
An organization that is dedicated to cultivating the arts in the city is the Spokane Valley Arts Council, an independent non-profit organization founded in 2004. The council maintains an exhibit of local artists in the CenterPlace Regional Event Center foyer, and commissions sculptures and monuments for community parks and buildings, as well as sponsors an artist showcase auction and fundraiser each October. The exhibits are rotated every three months.

In the theatre arts, the professional not-for-profit Spokane Valley Summer Theatre provides a season of live theater in the Central Valley Performing Arts Center located in Central Valley High School.

=== Museums ===
==== Spokane Valley Heritage Museum ====
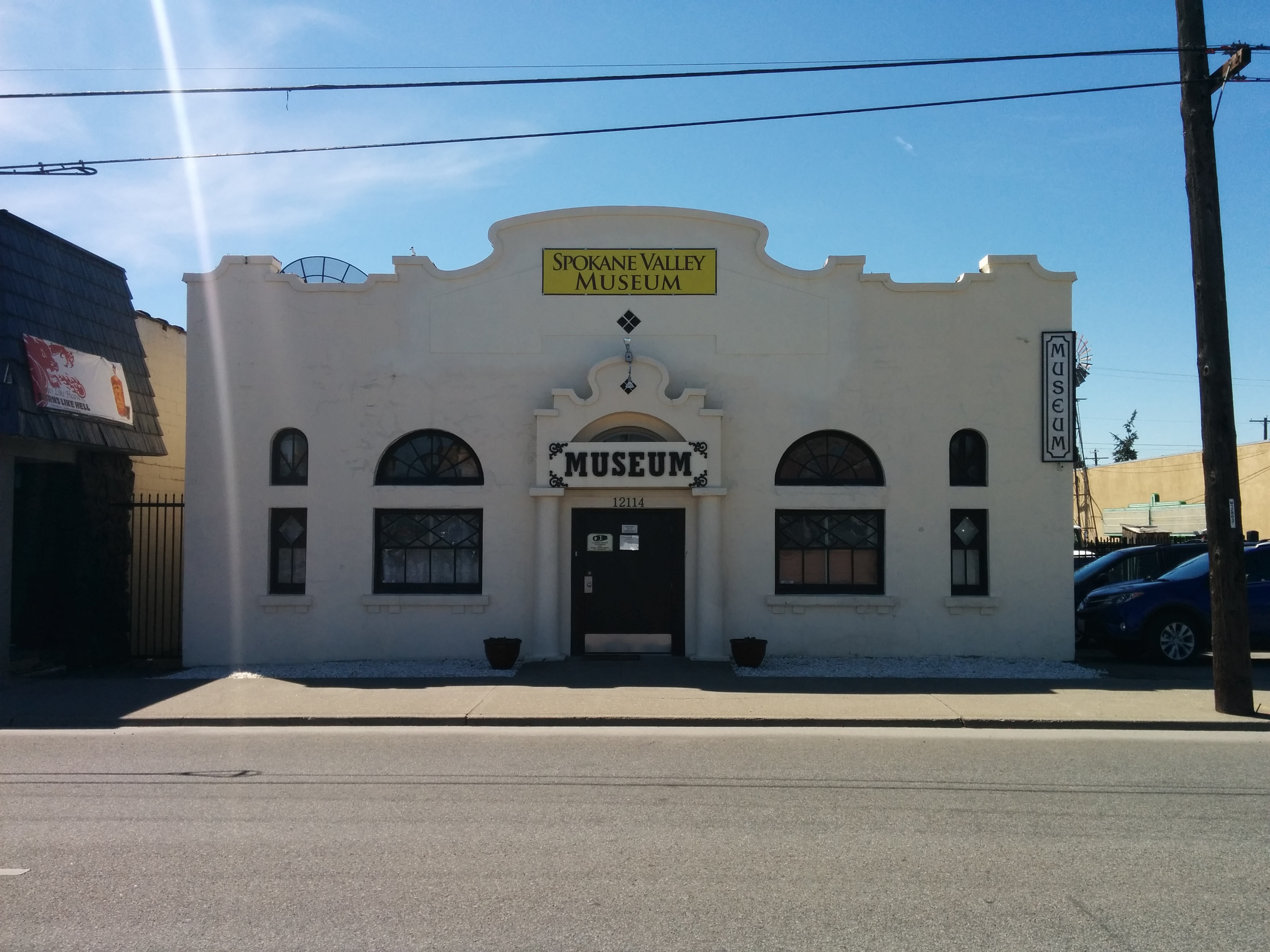
Spokane Valley Museum, housed in the old Opportunity Township Hall

The Spokane Valley Heritage Museum opened in 2005 and is located in the historic Spanish mission revivalist-style Opportunity Township Hall. The museum's goal is to collect, preserve and exhibit the history and culture of the Spokane Valley and the museum houses archives of old newspapers and records, photographs, as well as exhibits that feature stories about the Native Americans that historically inhabited the valley, apple orchards and industry in the valley, and exhibits that recount the city's early history with aircraft and flight.

=== Community events ===
==== Spokane County Interstate Fair ====
On the Friday after Labor Day, the Spokane County Fair and Expo Center hosts the ten-day Spokane County Interstate Fair. Events and activities at the fair revolve around traditional county fair activities such as carnival games and rides, food, a rodeo, and a livestock show accompanied by live music.

The Spokane County Fair and Expo Center is home to dozens of various events throughout the year; it is situated on 97 acres (0.39 km^{2}), with over 140,000 square feet (13,000 m^{2}) of exhibition space, livestock facilities, indoor and outdoor arenas, lawns, and parking.

==== Valleyfest ====
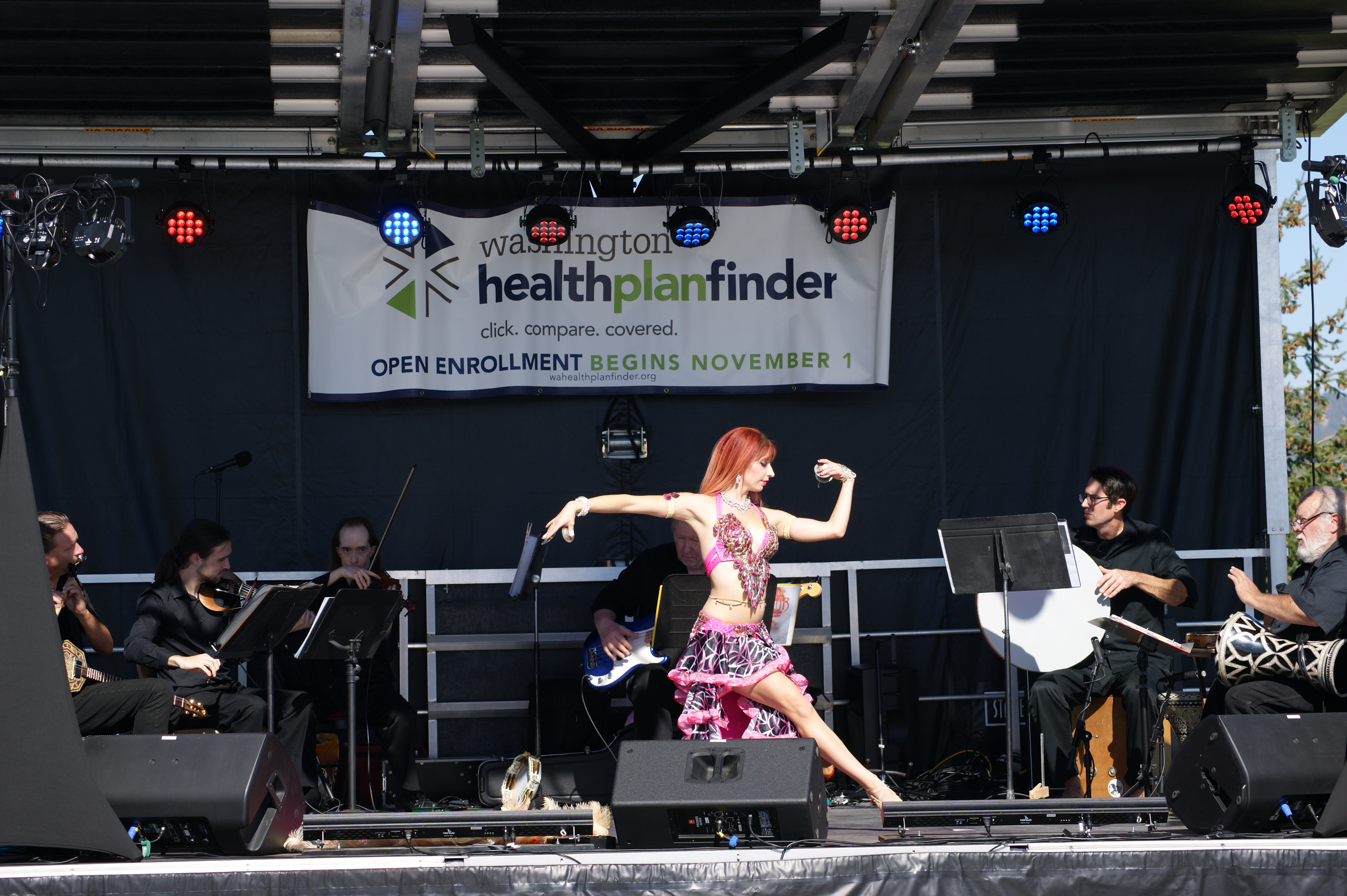
A live music performance at the 2022 Valleyfest.

Valleyfest is an annual three day festival held every September at Mirabeau Point Park, the adjacent CenterPlace Regional Event Center, and Plantes Ferry Park and Sports Complex. Festivities include the Hearts of Gold parade down Sprague Avenue, "Fishing at the Falls", a classic car show, and a 5K or 10K run and duathlon that starts and ends at Plantes Ferry Park. The event features live music and hosts various other activities at the CenterPlace Regional Event Center.

==== Inland NW Craft Beer Festival ====
The Inland Northwest Craft Beer Festival (formerly the Spokane Oktoberfest) is a two-day beer festival hosted by the Washington Beer Commission annually in September at Avista Stadium. The festival showcases the offerings of local and Washington state breweries and sometimes breweries in other western states. The festival features live music and food truck vendors for attendees; one day of the festival caters to family friendly activities as well and features a bouncy house.

== Sports ==
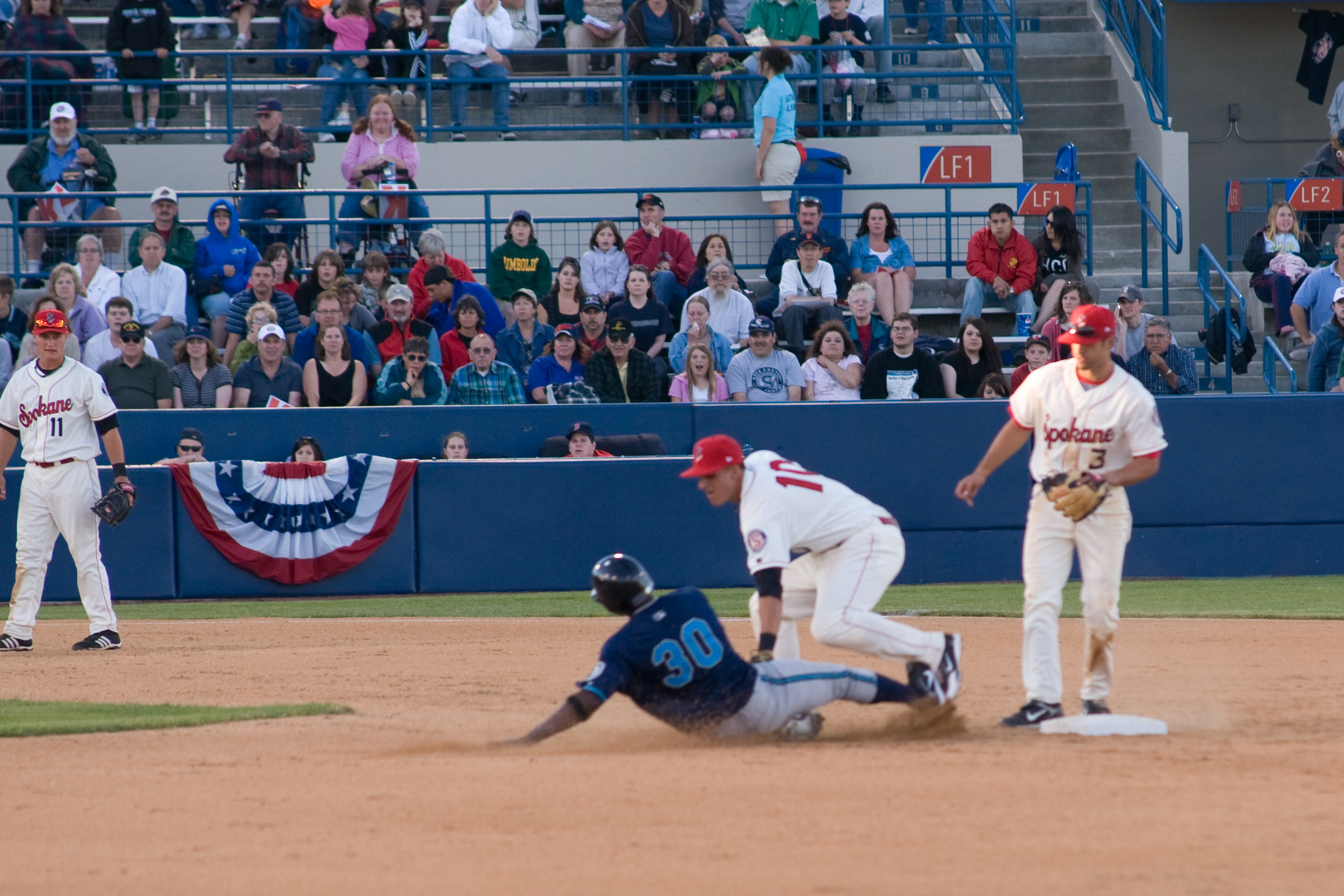
Spokane Indians game at Avista Stadium

The Spokane Indians, a High Single-A baseball team in the Northwest League (NWL) and a farm team of the Colorado Rockies since 2021, have their home ground in the valley. The Indians play their home games at the 6,803-seat Avista Stadium and have won seven NWL titles since their Short-Season-A debut in 1982. Prior to 1982, the Indians played in the Triple-A level Pacific Coast League (PCL); the franchise has won 12 league titles: four in the PCL and eight in the NWL.

Spokane Valley hosts the annual Cycle Celebration, a cycling event presented by the organizers of Valleyfest. The event caters to beginning riders as well as more serious riders with 10-mile, 25-mile, and 50-mile marked routes with comfort stations along the course. Each route starts at the Mirabeau Point Park Meadows and the 10-mile course is routed east onto the Spokane River Centennial Trail, while the 25-mile course takes riders to the Saltese Uplands, and the most rigorous 50-mile course is routed through a rural area over hills and prairies that provide views of Mica Peak and Mount Spokane before reaching the finish line at Liberty Lake.

== Parks and recreation ==
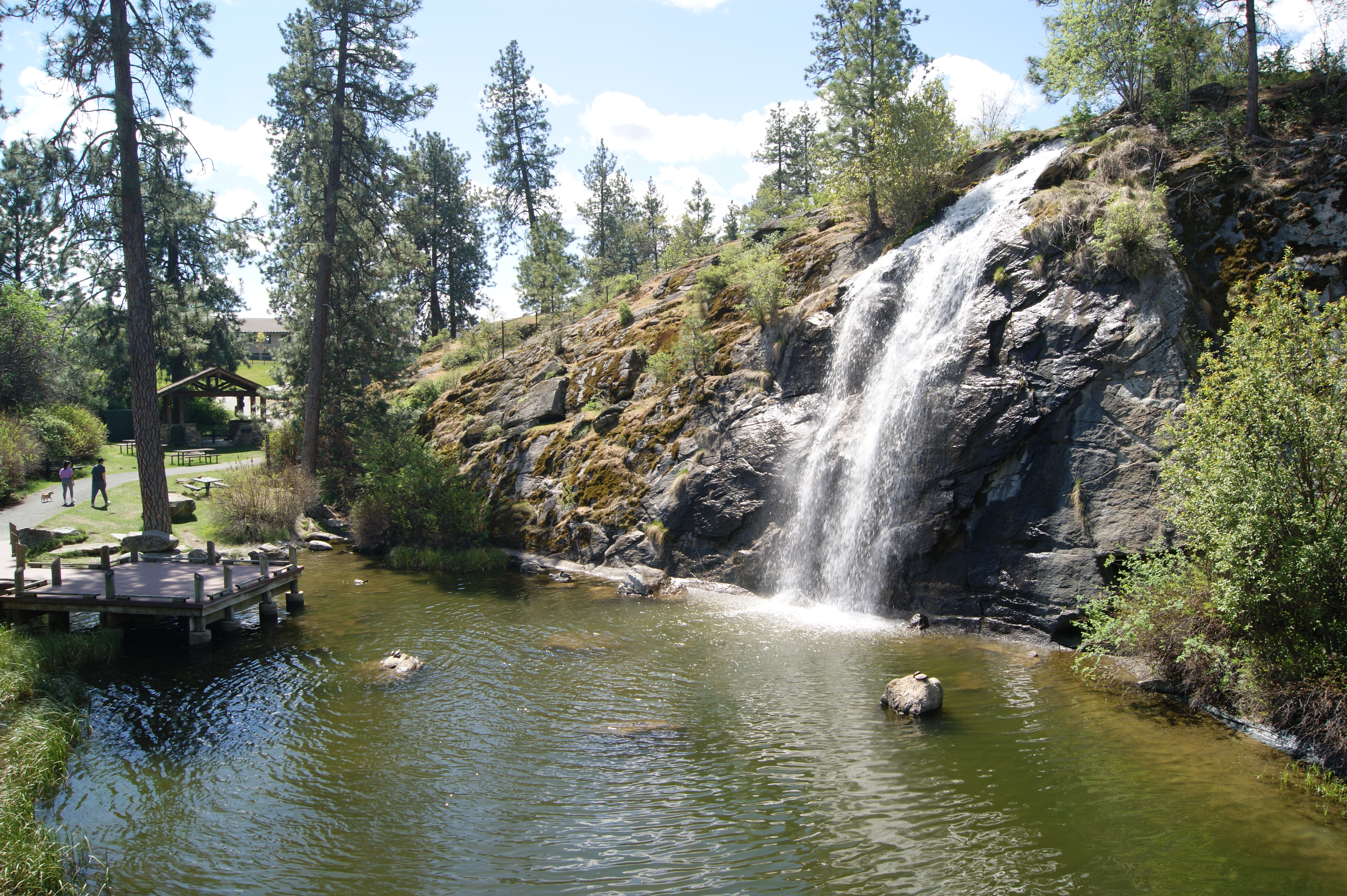
Mirabeau Point Park waterfall

The City of Spokane Valley maintains about 254 acres (1.03 km^{2}) of parkland and open spaces. Among the most notable parks is Mirabeau Point Park, as it contains the CenterPlace Regional Event Center, the Discovery Playground, the flat and grassy Mirabeau Meadows as well as a natural area that features walking trails and an artificial spring-fed waterfall, the Mirabeau Springs waterfall. The natural area of the park is a popular place for the rock climbing community, featuring 14 bolted routes, and toward the eastern edge of the park is a connection to the Centennial Trail. Spokane Valley also has three seasonal outdoor pools.

== Government ==
The City of Spokane Valley was incorporated on March 31, 2003, and operates as a non-charter code city under a council-manager government. Under the council-manager form of government, law making authority is vested in an elected city council and a hired city manager who is responsible to administer and execute the policies and plans of the legislative branch. The city council consists of seven councilmembers whom are elected at-large every two years with four-year terms; Council meetings are held in the Council Chambers of City Hall on Tuesdays at 6 pm. The Mayor is appointed from among the councilmembers on a biennial basis at the first meeting of a new council and is the ceremonial leadership position in the city.

In Washington state government, the city of Spokane Valley is located in Washington's 4th legislative district and in the federal government, the city is in Washington's 5th congressional district and is represented by Representative Michael Baumgartner and Senators Maria Cantwell and Patty Murray.

== Education ==
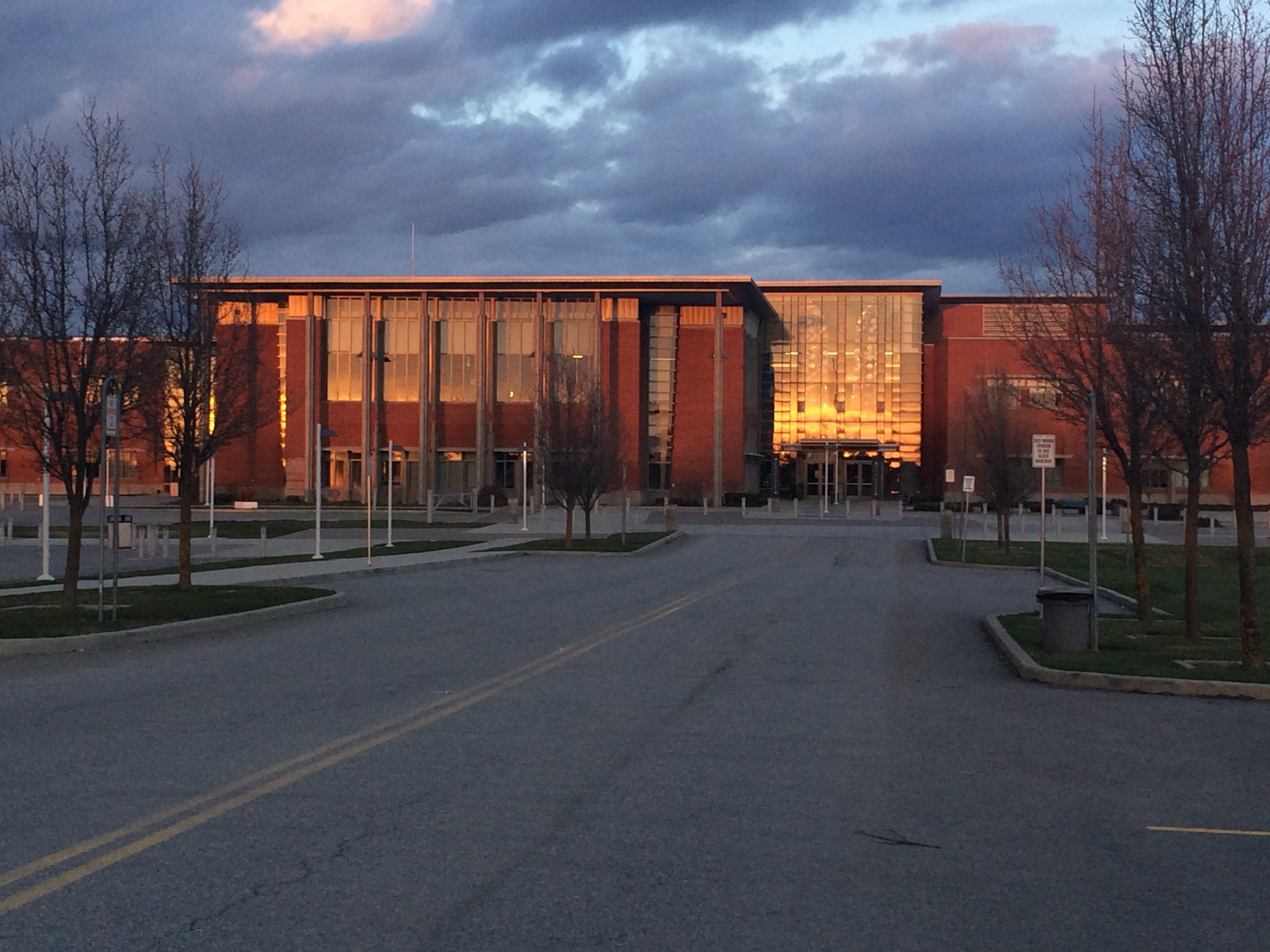
Central Valley High School

Within Spokane Valley city limits, the public has access to one library which is part of the Spokane County Library District and features a studio which can be used for recording, production, and broadcasting. For educational attainment, 93.3 percent of the city residents have a high school diploma or higher and 23.4 percent hold a bachelor's degree or higher.

Public primary and secondary education in Spokane Valley is provided by multiple public school districts, including the Central Valley School District (CVSD), West Valley School District (WVSD), East Valley School District (EVSD), and a portion of western Spokane Valley by Spokane Public Schools (SPS). Of the school districts exclusive to the valley, the largest in terms of enrollment is CVSD with a student population of 14,593 in grades PK-12th grade, followed by EVSD with 4,277, and WVSD with 3,862. There are also several private schools in the city, most of which are parochial. Private schools include the PK-12 grade Valley Christian School, a non-denominational Christian school and The Oaks Academy, an ACCS-accredited K-12 non-denominational Christian school. High school students in the region can attend Spokane Valley Tech, a vocational school supported by a consortium of area school districts that offers free technical training for high school juniors and seniors to gain skills for career development in emerging industries and prepare for college. The Spokane Valley Tech Skills Center and STEM Academy primarily serves high school students attending public and private high schools in the greater Spokane area and eastern Washington region.

Historically, Spokane Valley had a four-year liberal arts college called Spokane University, which was founded in 1913 and was noted for its fine arts program which included Clyfford Still, a leading figure in the abstract expressionist movement as an alum; the university ceased operations in 1933 amidst the Great Depression. The locale it once occupied bears reminders of the institution in the form of a road name, University Road and a public high school that once used the former university campus, University High School. The Valley Christian School currently occupies the campus grounds.

Active higher education institutions in the Spokane Valley includes a campus of Carrington College, which primarily offers degree programs in healthcare fields such as medical assisting, veterinary assisting and medical billing and coding. The school has produced a large portion of the medical assistants in the area hospitals.

== Media ==
Spokane Valley is part of neighboring Spokane's television and radio markets. The city has a weekly newspaper which publishes on Fridays, the Valley News Herald, which formed in 1996 with the merger of the Valley News and the Valley Herald.

== Infrastructure ==
=== Transportation ===
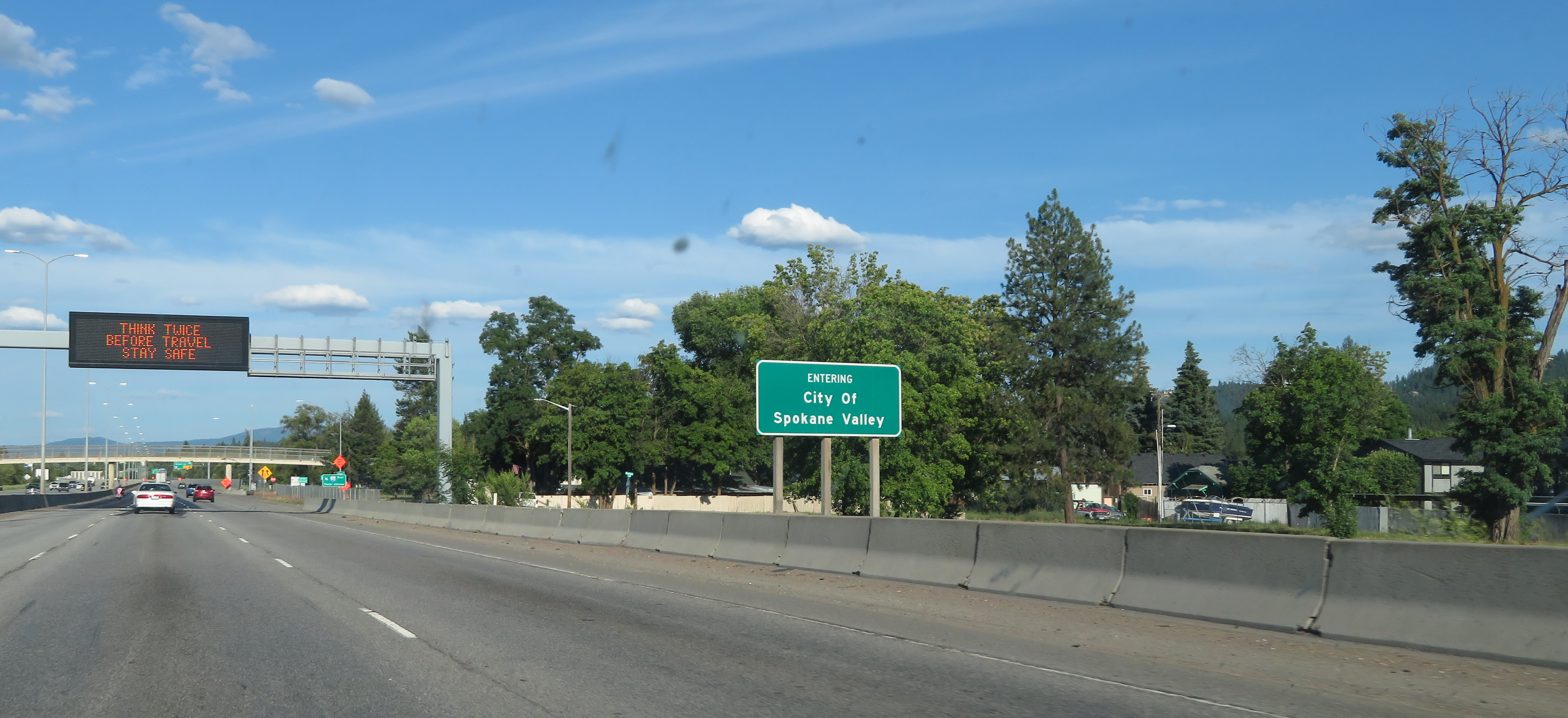
Interstate 90 entering Spokane Valley

==== Roads and highways ====
Due to the city's suburban nature and its rural roots before its post World War II suburbanization, the design of Spokane Valley's streets contain many curvilinear streets, discontinuous streets, cul-de-sacs, and other features typical of suburbs. The major retail corridor and one of the most highly trafficked arterial roads in the city is Sprague Avenue, which travels east–west from downtown Spokane to Liberty Lake. Other east–west arterials for the valley include Trent Avenue, Mission Avenue, Broadway Avenue, and 32nd Avenue. Sprague Avenue in Spokane Valley is designated as Interstate 90 Business and Trent Avenue carries the designation of Washington State Route 290, where it is routed from the Interstate 90 Hamilton interchange in Spokane northeast to the Idaho border. For north–south travel, the major arterial streets are Argonne/Mullan roads, Pines road, Evergreen road and Sullivan road. Pines Road is the northernmost portion of Washington State Route 27, serving Spokane and Whitman counties and routed between Pullman and Spokane Valley where it terminates at the intersection with Trent Avenue; Washington State Route 27 is part of the Palouse Scenic Byway. Spokane Valley can be accessed from Interstate 90 at exits 285 to 293 as it travels from its termini of Seattle, Washington in the west to Boston, Massachusetts in the east, connecting Spokane, Spokane Valley, and Coeur d'Alene along its transcontinental route. The average commute to work is about 21 minutes. Traffic congestion on the interstate is increasing and causing travel delays particularly during peak commute hours according to the Washington State Department of Transportation (WSDOT); starting in 2019, the WSDOT started installing ramp meters to help reduce the congestion caused by accidents in particular, which contributed to a quarter of the congestion issues according to a study.

==== Public transportation ====
The public transportation needs for Spokane Valley as well as most of Spokane County is served by Spokane Transit Authority (STA), which maintains the Pence-Cole Valley Transit Center (VTC) and has a few park-and-ride locations throughout the city. The STA has one regular route, and two peak use express routes that service the VTC hub.

==== Airports ====
The closest major airport serving Spokane Valley and the Spokane–Coeur d'Alene area is Spokane International Airport, which is served by six airlines and is 16 miles (26 km) to the west in Spokane. Felts Field is a general aviation airport located near Spokane Valley along the south bank of the Spokane River; the Federal Aviation Administration categorizes it as a regional reliever facility.

=== Healthcare ===
Spokane Valley is served by one general hospital, the 123-bed MultiCare Valley Hospital as well as specialty and urgent care clinics operated by the MultiCare Health System, Providence Health & Services, and the Community Health Association of Spokane (CHAS Health), a non-profit Federally Qualified Health Center that primarily serves the needs of the uninsured with medical, dental, pharmacy, and behavioral health services. Ambulance service in Spokane County is contracted to American Medical Response (as of 2021).

Spokane Valley
- Crime rates* (2022)

Violent crimes
- Homicide: 3
- Rape: 49
- Robbery: 71
- Aggravated assault: 239
- Total violent crime: 362

Property crimes
- Burglary: 563
- Larceny-theft: 3408
- Motor vehicle theft: 563
- Arson: 8
- Total property crime: 4542
- Note: Reported crimes per 100,000 population Source: 2022 FBI UCR Data

=== Utilities ===
Electric service in Spokane Valley is provided by a variety of providers, including Avista Utilities, Inland Power & Light, Modern Electric Water Company, and Vera Water & Power. Water service is also provided by a patchwork of different providers, including the City of Spokane Water Department, Modern Electric Water Company, and various water districts. This is due to the rural beginnings of the neighborhoods that now make up the city of Spokane Valley and a legacy of the providers that came into operation to meet the needs of the agricultural consumers that predated the suburbanization of the area. The city draws its water supply from the Spokane Valley–Rathdrum Prairie Aquifer. For sewer service, Spokane County Environmental Services is the sole provider and Avista Utilities is the sole provider for natural gas. The valley is serviced by Xfinity Comcast and Centurylink and some smaller telecom providers for cable TV and residential internet.

=== Public safety ===
==== Police department ====
The Spokane Valley Police Department (SVPD) is a contracted division of the Spokane County Sheriff's Office, with Spokane Valley being the largest city the sheriff's office serves. Deputies assigned to the Spokane Valley Precinct use distinct patrol vehicles and have distinct uniforms and patches. The SVPD has is an accredited member of the Washington Association of Sheriffs and Police Chiefs.

==== Fire department ====
The Spokane Valley Fire Department (SVFD) is a special-purpose fire district that has served the greater Spokane Valley area since 1940. The department was originally formed as the Spokane Valley Fire Protection District No. 1, though they had unofficially been referred to as the "Spokane Valley Fire Department" or "Valley Fire Department" since the 1940s. SVFD officially adopted their present name in 2007. The SVFD provides emergency services to the cities of Spokane Valley, Liberty Lake, Millwood, and nearby areas of unincorporated Spokane County such as Otis Orchards and Pasadena Park.
