= Dishman, Washington =

- Locale
- Location of Dishman, Washington
- Coordinates: 47°39′24″N 117°16′40″W
- Country: United States
- State: Washington
- County: Spokane

Area
  - Total: 3.4 sq mi (8.7 km^{2})
  - Land: 3.4 sq mi (8.7 km^{2})
  - Water: 0 sq mi (0.0 km^{2})
- Elevation: 1,985 ft (605 m)

Population (2000)
  - Total: 10,031
  - Density: 2,970/sq mi (1,146.6/km^{2})
- Time zone: UTC-8 (Pacific (PST))
  - Summer (DST): UTC-7 (PDT)
- FIPS code: 53-17985
- GNIS feature ID: 1512151

Dishman is a locale and former census-designated place (CDP) in Spokane County, Washington, United States. Founded by Addison T. Dishman (II), who operated a nearby rock quarry in 1889, its population was 10,031 at the 2000 census. Dishman has been part of Spokane Valley since 2003.

== Geography ==
Dishman is located at 47°39′24″N 117°16′40″W (47.656544, -117.277809).

According to the United States Census Bureau, the CDP had a total area of 3.4 square miles (8.8 km^{2}), all of it land.

== Demographics ==
Historical population
| Census | Pop. | Note | %± |
|---|---|---|---|
| 1970 | 9,079 | | — |
| 1980 | 10,169 | | 12.0% |
| 1990 | 9,671 | | −4.9% |
| 2000 | 10,031 | | 3.7% |
U.S. Decennial Census; 1960 1970 1980 1990; 2000 2010

Dishman first appeared as an unincorporated community in the 1970 U.S. census; and as a census designated place in the 1980 U.S. census. The CDP was dissolved after being absorbed into the newly incorporated city of Spokane Valley in 2003.

As of the census of 2000, there were 10,031 people, 4,151 households, and 2,565 families residing in the CDP. The population density was 2,969.7 per square mile (1,146.6/km^{2}). There were 4,408 housing units at an average density of 1,305.0 per square mile (503.9/km^{2}). The racial makeup of the CDP was 92.93% White, 0.81% African American, 1.81% Native American, 1.33% Asian, 0.03% Pacific Islander, 1.10% from other races, and 1.99% from two or more races. Hispanic or Latino of any race were 2.89% of the population.

There were 4,151 households, out of which 29.6% had children under the age of 18 living with them, 44.5% were married couples living together, 12.4% had a female householder with no husband present, and 38.2% were non-families. 31.2% of all households were made up of individuals, and 10.4% had someone living alone who was 65 years of age or older. The average household size was 2.36 and the average family size was 2.96.

In the CDP, the age distribution of the population shows 24.6% under the age of 18, 9.7% from 18 to 24, 29.3% from 25 to 44, 21.0% from 45 to 64, and 15.5% who were 65 years of age or older. The median age was 37 years. For every 100 females, there were 97.1 males. For every 100 females age 18 and over, there were 93.0 males.

The median income for a household in the CDP was $32,512, and the median income for a family was $40,085. Males had a median income of $30,929 versus $23,388 for females. The per capita income for the CDP was $16,721. About 10.4% of families and 14.2% of the population were below the poverty line, including 23.2% of those under age 18 and 8.1% of those age 65 or over.
