= Veradale, Washington =

Veradale, Washington Vera
- Locale
- Location of the CDP of Veradale, Washington at the 2000 Census

- Location within Washington (state)
- Coordinates: 47°39′1″N 117°12′32″W
- Country: United States
- State: Washington
- County: Spokane
- Founded: 1911
- Founded by: D. K. McDonald
- Named after: Vera McDonald

Area
  - Total: 3.1 sq mi (8.0 km^{2})
  - Land: 3.1 sq mi (8.0 km^{2})
  - Water: 0 sq mi (0.0 km^{2})
- Elevation: 2,024 ft (617 m)

Population (2000)
  - Total: 9,387
  - Density: 3,042/sq mi (1,174.6/km^{2})
- Time zone: UTC-8 (Pacific (PST))
  - Summer (DST): UTC-7 (PDT)
- ZIP code: 99037
- Area code: 509
- FIPS code: 53-74725
- GNIS feature ID: 1512761 (Note: Veradale); 1511395 (Note: Vera)

Veradale—originally known as Vera—is a locale and former census-designated place in Spokane County, Washington, United States. The population was 9,387 at the 2000 census. Veradale retains its own post office.

== History ==
Veradale was named for Vera McDonald, the daughter of the man who founded the community in 1911. Since 2003, the area has been incorporated as part of the city of Spokane Valley.

== Geography ==
Veradale is located at 47°39′1″N 117°12′32″W (47.650195, -117.208937).

According to the United States Census Bureau, the CDP has a total area of 3.1 sq mi (8.0 km^{2}), all of it land.

=== Places in vicinity ===
The following diagram represents the locations in a radius of 5.0 miles (8.0 km) around Veradale.

Localities in Vincity

== Demographics ==
As of the census of 2000, there were 9,387 people, 3,317 households, and 2,540 families residing in the CDP. The population density was 3,042.3 people per square mile (1,172.9/km^{2}). There were 3,440 housing units at an average density of 1,114.9/sq mi (429.8/km^{2}). The racial makeup of the CDP was 93.94% White, 1.05% African American, 0.79% Native American, 1.87% Asian, 0.05% Pacific Islander, 0.49% from other races, and 1.80% from two or more races. Hispanic or Latino of any race were 2.32% of the population.

There were 3,317 households, out of which 39.8% had children under the age of 18 living with them, 62.9% were married couples living together, 10.0% had a female householder with no husband present, and 23.4% were non-families. 19.0% of all households were made up of individuals, and 7.1% had someone living alone who was 65 years of age or older. The average household size was 2.78 and the average family size was 3.16.

In the former CDP, the age distribution of the population shows 29.3% under the age of 18, 7.1% from 18 to 24, 28.2% from 25 to 44, 22.6% from 45 to 64, and 12.8% who were 65 years of age or older. The median age was 37 years. For every 100 females, there were 93.3 males. For every 100 females age 18 and over, there were 90.5 males.

The median income for a household in the CDP was $46,676, and the median income for a family was $50,000. Males had a median income of $35,259 versus $25,417 for females. The per capita income for the CDP was $19,342. About 2.9% of families and 4.1% of the population were below the poverty line, including 1.4% of those under age 18 and 8.3% of those age 65 or over.
