= Washington State Knowledge Bowl Tournament =

Washington State Knowledge Bowl is an academic competition for high school students in Washington State. Imported from Colorado, Olympic ESD 114 coordinated the state's first Knowledge Bowl competition during the 1980-1981 school year in which forty-two teams from the region's fifteen high schools competed.

Within a few years, all ESDs in the state were coordinating regional competitions and the first state tournament was held in 1983.

== Regional Competitions ==
Each of the nine ESDs (Educational Service Districts) in Washington State hold regional Knowledge Bowl competitions. Regional competitions are held between November and early March. Each ESD decides the format that will be used in their respective regions and how many regional competitions will be held.

The regional competitions that determine which teams will advance to the state-level tournament typically take place in February or early March. The number of teams each ESD region is allotted for the state tournament varies each year with the number of schools that compete at each division (based on Washington Interscholastic Activities Association classification) in each ESD region. The top 18 teams in Divisions 4A, 2A, 1A, and 2B, and the top 12 teams in Divisions 3A and 1B, advance to the state tournament.

The ESD regions are as follows:

- ESD 101 (Northeast Washington)
- ESD 105 (Yakima Valley)
- ESD 112 (Southwest Washington)
- ESD 113 (West Central, Coast)
- ESD 114 (Olympic Peninsula)
- ESD 121 (Puget Sound)
- ESD 123 (Southeast Washington)
- ESD 171 (North Central Washington)
- ESD 189 (Northwest Washington)

== State Tournament ==
The state tournament takes place annually in March.

The format for the state tournament begins with a written round of 50 multiple-choice questions with a 35-minute time limit. Up to six team members may participate in the written round. This is followed by four Preliminary oral rounds of 50 questions each, setting the stage for the Semi-Final and Championship rounds, also oral rounds of 50 questions each. Only four team members may compete in the oral rounds. Team member substitutions are allowed at the half-way point (after question 25) of each oral round.

== Washington State Knowledge Bowl Champions ==
Year	4A	3A	2A	1A	2B (2007–Present)/B (1998-2006)	1B(after 2007)
1998	Kamiakin High School	Lakes High School	Pullman High School	Charles Wright Academy	St. George's School	
1999	Henry Foss High School	Lakes High School	Connell High School	Charles Wright Academy	St. George's School	
2000	Enumclaw High School	Newport High School	Blaine High School	Charles Wright Academy	St. George's School	
2001	Kamiakin High School	Skyview High School	Port Townsend High School	Charles Wright Academy	St. George's School	
2002	Capital High School	Bellingham High School	Eatonville High School	Freeman High School	St. George's School	
2003	Capital High School	Kelso High School	Port Townsend High School	Okanogan High School	St. George's School	
2004	Capital High School	Lakeside School	Port Townsend High School	Riverside Christian School	St. George's School	
2005	Kamiakin High School	Lakeside School	Medical Lake High School	Charles Wright Academy	St. George's School	
2006	Lewis and Clark High School	Bellevue High School	Stevenson High School	Charles Wright Academy	Pe Ell High School	
2007	Mountain View High School	Hanford High School	Blaine High School	Chelan High School	Federal Way Public Academy	Pe Ell High School
2008	Kamiak High School	Kennewick High School	Sequim High School	Charles Wright Academy	St. George's School	Pe Ell High School
2009	Kamiak High School	Kennedy High School	Charles Wright Academy	Freeman High School	DeSales High School	Almira/Coulee-Hartline High School
2010	Skyview High School	Camas High School	Pullman High School	Port Townsend High School	St. George's School	Odessa High School
2011	Olympia High School	Camas High School	Anacortes High School	Colville High School	DeSales High School	Wilbur High School
2012	Central Valley High School	Camas High School	Pullman High School	Colville High School	Northwest Christian High School	Wilbur High School
2013	Camas High School	Charles Wright Academy	West Valley High School	Stevenson High School	Harrison Prep	Valley Christian School
2014	Olympia High School	Hanford High School	Lakewood High School	Stevenson High School	Northwest Christian School	Pope John Paul II High School (Lacey)
2015	Olympia High School	Charles Wright Academy	East Valley High School	Eatonville High School	St. George's School	Pope John Paul II High School (Lacey)
2016	Moses Lake High School	Glacier Peak High School	East Valley High School	Eatonville High School	La Conner High School	Wilbur High School
2017	Moses Lake High School	Lakeside School	Charles Wright Academy	Cashmere High School	Liberty Bell High School	Pope John Paul II High School (Lacey)
2018	Kamiak High School	Interlake High School	Sequim High School	Medical Lake High School	Federal Way Public Academy	West Sound Academy
2019	Hanford High School	Stanwood High School	Charles Wright Academy	Port Townsend High School	Liberty Bell High School	Riverside Christian School
2022	Olympia High School	Garfield High School	Ridgefield High School	Cascade High School (Leavenworth, Washington)	Life Christian Academy	Valley Christian School
2023	Gonzaga Preparatory School	Ridgeline High School	Ridgefield High School	Port Townsend High School	Liberty High School (Spangle)	West Sound Academy
2024	Olympia High School	Hazen High School	Charles Wright Academy	Port Townsend High School	Liberty High School (Spangle)	Wilbur High School
2025	Hanford High School	Gig Harbor High School	Ridgefield High School	Columbia High School (White Salmon)	Liberty High School (Spangle)	Northwest Christian High School
2026	Hazen High School	Snohomish High School	Ridgefield High School	Columbia High School (White Salmon)	CAM Academy	Northwest Christian High School
