= Washington Interscholastic Activities Association =

High school athletics governing body

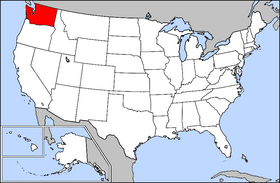
- Abbreviation: WIAA
- Formation: 1905, 121 years ago
- Type: Volunteer; NPO
- Legal status: Association
- Purpose: Athletic/Educational
- Headquarters: 435 Main Avenue South; Renton, WA 98057
- Coordinates: 47.477°N 122.205°W
- Region served: Washington
- Executive Director: Mick Hoffman
- Affiliations: National Federation of State High School Associations
- Staff: 14
- Website: wiaa.com
- Remarks: (425) 687-8585

The Washington Interscholastic Activities Association (WIAA) is the governing body of athletics and activities for secondary education schools in the U.S. state of Washington. As of October 2024, the private, 501(c)(3) nonprofit organization consists of nearly 800 member high schools and middle/junior high schools, both public and private.

== Purpose ==
Founded in 1905 to "create equitable playing conditions" between member teams, the WIAA plans and supervises interscholastic sports and activities approved and delegated by the various school district boards of directors. The organization emphasizes the importance of interscholastic sports and activities in the "total educational process" while recognizing that education is the primary responsibility of its member schools.

The WIAA creates and governs rules to establish uniformity of standards in sports and activities; to protect the safety and health of students; to shield students from exploitation by special interest groups; to provide fair and equal opportunities to all students participating; and to encourage good sportsmanship. A stated goal of the organization is to promote diversity of its membership at all levels.

The organization also provides member schools an open channel of communication with other members to organize any events and activities, as well as to resolve any issues. In addition, the WIAA recognizes achievement and excellence of member teams and individuals participating in sports and activities.

== Funding ==
Primary funding for the WIAA is through ticket sales for state tournaments and other events. Additional funds are secured through corporate sponsorships, memberships fees, and small percentages of the sales of merchandise related to the organization and its member schools. As a private organization, the WIAA does not receive any funding via tax dollars and is not financially supported by the State of Washington.

== WIAA-sanctioned sports & activities ==
The WIAA oversees athletics and fine arts in Washington state. As of October 2024, the organization hosts 120 state championship events for the following sports and activities:

=== Athletics ===
- Baseball (boys)
- Basketball
- Bowling (girls)
- Cross Country
- Football (boys)
- Flag Football (girls)
- Golf
- Gymnastics (girls)
- Soccer
- Softball (girls)
- Swimming & Diving
- Tennis
- Track & Field
- Volleyball (girls)
- Wrestling

=== Other activities ===
- Cheerleading
- Dance & Drill Team
- Debate, Forensics & Student Congress
- Drama
- Music

== Classifications ==
The organization places member schools into one of six classification tiers based on enrollment ranges: 1B, 2B, 1A, 2A, 3A, and 4A. Classification tiers are based on student body enrollment in grades 9–11 and used by the WIAA to maintain fair and equal competition between its member high schools. The enrollment ranges are evaluated by the WIAA Executive Board every four years and finalized for a four-year period. Enrollments of single-gender schools are doubled for classification purposes.

Current enrollment classifications (2024–2028)
Classification	Enrollment (gr. 9–11)	Member schools	Opted -up
4A	1201+	60	6
3A	900-1200	73	13
2A	450–899	63	2
1A	225–449	55	8
2B	105-224	54	1
1B	1-104	105	–
Total		410	

Historic classification, by enrollment
Years	Enrollment class					
Years	4A	3A	2A	1A	2B	1B
2008–10	1281+	919–1280	468–918	188–467	88–187	0–87
2010–12	1304+	1086–1303	513–1085	208–512	93–207	0–92
2012–14	1304+	1086–1303	513–1085	208–512	93–207	0–92
2014–16	1252.4+	990.9–1252.3	472-990.8	225-471.9	90-224.9	26-89.9
2016–20	1343.29+	971.72–1343.28	461–971.71	214.50–461.24	31–214.49	26–82.99
2020–24	1300+	900–1299	450–899	225–449	105–224	1-104

=== Opt-up ===
Historic classification tiers
Years	4A	3A	2A	1A	2B	1B
2006–present	4A	3A	2A	1A	2B	1B
1998–2006	4A	3A	2A	1A	B	
1969–1997	AAA	AA		A	B	
1958–1968	AA		A		B	
1945–1957	A				B	
1944–1945	single classification					
1942–1943	A				B	
1934–1941	single classification					
1931–1933	A				B	
1923–1930	single classification					

Member schools may choose to move up to a higher classification tier to compete against schools with larger enrollments. If a school chooses to opt up, it must notify the WIAA office on or before the second Friday in January of the first year of the four-year classification cycle.

== League alignments ==
WIAA districts are divided approximately by county

The WIAA is divided into nine districts that represent approximate geographical areas. Each district is presided over by a District Director. Member schools are aligned into geographical conferences or leagues for competition. District membership is determined by these conferences and leagues with the exception of two. The Columbia Basin Big Nine Conference and Central Washington Athletic Conference have member schools in two districts. Conference and League alignment is determined annually. The following are league alignments as of 2016-2017 school year and are subject to revision to adjust for the 2016-2020 reclassification.

WIAA League alignments
District		Leagues					
No.	Name	4A	3A	2A	1A	2B	1B
1	Northwest	Wesco 4A	Wesco 2A/3A				Northwest 1B
1	Northwest		Northwest 1A/2A/3A			Northwest 1B/2B	
2	Sea-King	Kingco 4A	Kingco 3A	Kingco 2A	Emerald Sound 1A	Sea-Tac 1B/2B	
2	Sea-King	Metro 4A	Metro 3A	Metro 2A		Independent	
3	West Central	South Puget Sound 4A	South Sound 3A	South Puget Sound 2A	Nisqually 1A		North Olympic 1B
3	West Central	North Puget Sound 3A/4A					
3	West Central		Pierce County 3A				
3	West Central		Olympic 2A/3A				Independent
4	Southwest	Greater St. Helens 4A	Greater St. Helens 3A	Greater St. Helens 2A	Trico 1A	Pacific 2B	Coastal 1B
4	Southwest			Evergreen 2A	Evergreen 1A	Central 2B	Columbia Valley 1B
5	Yakima Valley	Columbia Basin Big 9 4A		Central Washington 2A	South Central 1A	Eastern Washington 2B	Central Washington 1B
6	North Central	Columbia Basin Big 9 4A		Central Washington 2A	Caribou Trail 1A	Central Washington 2B	Central Washington 1B
7	Northeast				Northeast 1A	Northeast 2B	Northeast 1B
8	Greater Spokane	Greater Spokane League 2A/3A/4A					
8	Greater Spokane	Mid-Columbia 3A/4A					
9	Southeast						Southeast 1B East

=== Northwest District One ===
The Northwest Interscholastic Activities Association governs WIAA District 1, which encompasses the five counties in the northwest section of Washington State: Whatcom, Skagit, Snohomish, San Juan, and Island. As of February 2011, Northwest District 1 includes seven leagues with member schools from all classifications and a single independent member school. The Western High School Athletic Conference regulates two 4A classification leagues and one 3A classification league. Its membership consists of high schools in the public school districts of Arlington, Edmonds, Everett, Lake Stevens, Marysville, Monroe, Mukilteo, Oak Harbor, Shoreline, Snohomish, and Stanwood. The North Sound Conference regulates member schools residing in the 1A classification. Its membership consists of high schools in Snohomish, Island and north King counties, in and near Everett. The Northwest Conference regulates member schools in 3A, 2A and 1A classifications. Its membership consists of high schools in western Whatcom, Skagit and counties, in and near Bellingham and Mount Vernon. The Northwest 2B/1B League regulates member schools in 2B and 1B classifications. Its membership consists of high schools in San Juan, Skagit, Island and Snohomish counties. The Northwest B League regulates member schools in 1B classification. Its membership consists of small public and private high schools in San Juan, Snohomish, Skagit and Whatcom counties.

Northwest District One league alignments

WesCo 4A

- Arlington Eagles
- Cascade Bruins
- Glacier Peak Grizzlies
- Jackson Timberwolves
- Kamiak Knights
- Lake Stevens Vikings
- Mariner Marauders

WesCo 2A/3A

- Archbishop Murphy Wildcats (2A)
- Edmonds-Woodway Warriors
- Everett Seagulls
- Lynnwood Royals
- Marysville-Getchell Chargers
- Marysville-Pilchuck Tomahawks (2A)
- Meadowdale Mavericks
- Monroe Bearcats
- Mountlake Terrace Hawks
- Shorecrest Scots
- Shorewood Stormrays
- Snohomish Panthers
- Stanwood Spartans

Northwest Conference (1A/2A/3A)

- Anacortes Seahawks (2A)
- Bellingham Bayhawks(2A)
- Blaine Borderites (1A)
- Burlington-Edison Tigers (2A)
- Ferndale Golden Eagles (3A)
- Lakewood Cougars (2A)
- Lynden Lions (2A)
- Lynden Christian Lyncs (1A)
- Meridian Trojans (1A)
- Mount Baker Mountaineers (1A)
- Mount Vernon Bulldogs (3A)
- Nooksack Valley Pioneers (1A)
- Oak Harbor Wildcats (3A)
- Sedro-Woolley Cubs (3A)
- Sehome Mariners (2A)
- Squalicum Storm (2A)

Northwest 1B/2B League (1B/2B)

- Concrete Lions(1B)
- Darrington Loggers(1B)
- Friday Harbor Wolverines (2B)
- La Conner Braves(2B)
- Mount Vernon Christian Hurricanes (1B)
- Orcas Island Vikings (2B)
- Chimacum Cowboys (2B)
- Coupeville Wolves (2B)

Northwest 1B League

- Arlington Christian Lions
- Cedar Park Christian - Lynnwood Eagles
- Grace Academy Eagles
- Shoreline Christian Chargers
- Lopez Island Lobos
- Lummi Nation Blackhawks
- Providence Classical Christian Highlanders
- Skykomish Rockets
- Fellowship Christian Eagles
- Tulalip Heritage Hawks
- Orcas Christian School Saints

=== SeaKing District Two ===
The SeaKing District encompasses mostly schools in King County. The schools are in all classification sizes and separated into five leagues by size and location. A majority of the state's 3A schools are located in this district and the West Central District 3. The Center School, International Community School, International School, and Secondary BOC are independents in this District.

SeaKing District Two member schools

KingCo 4A

- Bothell Cougars
- Eastlake Wolves
- Inglemoor Vikings
- Issaquah Eagles
- Mount Si Wildcats
- Newport (Bellevue) Knights
- North Creek Jaguars
- Skyline Spartans
- Woodinville Falcons
- Redmond Mustangs
- Juanita Ravens
- Lake Washington Kangaroos
- Hazen Highlanders

KingCo 3A

- Bellevue Wolverines
- Interlake Saints
- Liberty Patriots
- Mercer Island Islanders
- Sammamish Totems
- Highline Pirates

KingCo 2A

- Foster Bulldogs
- Renton Redhawks
- Lindbergh Eagles
- Evergreen Wolverines
- Cedarcrest Redwolves

Metro League

- Ballard Beavers
- Blanchet Braves
- Chief Sealth Seahawks(2A)
- Cleveland Eagles(2A)
- Eastside Catholic Crusaders
- Franklin Quakers
- Garfield Bulldogs
- Holy Names Cougars (girls)
- Ingraham Rams
- Lakeside Lions
- Nathan Hale Raiders(2A)
- O'Dea Irish (boys)
- Rainier Beach Vikings
- Roosevelt Roughriders
- Seattle Prep Panthers
- West Seattle Wildcats
- Lincoln Lynx (4A)
- Seattle Academy Cardinals (2A)

Emerald Sound League (1A)

- Bear Creek Grizzlies
- Eastside Prep Eagles
- Forest Ridge School of the Sacred Heart
- Overlake Owls
- Seattle Academy Cardinals
- Sierra Spartans
- Bush Blazers
- Northwest Haüs
- University Prep Pumas
- King's Knights
- Cedar Park Christian Eagles
- Granite Falls Tigers
- South Whidbey Falcons

SeaTac (1B/2B)

- Auburn Adventist Falcons (2B)
- Christian Faith Eagles (1B)
- Crosspoint Academy Warriors (2B)
- Evergreen Lutheran Eagles (1B)
- Concordia Christian Hawks (1B)
- Northwest Yeshiva High School (1B)
- Pope John Paul II Eagles (1B)
- Puget Sound Adventist Sharks (1B)
- Quilcene Rangers (1B)
- Rainier Christian Mustangs (1B)
- Seattle Lutheran Saints (2B)
- Tacoma Baptist Crusaders (1B)

Independent

- Seattle Waldorf School

=== West Central District Three ===
The WCD encompasses schools in Clallam, Jefferson, Kitsap, Pierce, Mason, Thurston, and King counties of the northern Peninsula and southern Puget Sound areas of Washington. The district has the most 4A and 3A schools combined in the state, with 26 and 16 respectively. It includes schools from all classification sizes, although most of the 2B schools in the region are members SeaTac league of SeaKing District Two.

West Central District Three league alignments

North Puget Sound 3A/4A Olympic

- Auburn Trojans (4A)
- Auburn Mountainview Lions (3A)
- Auburn-Riverside Ravens (4A)
- Decatur Golden Gators (3A)
- Federal Way Eagles (3A)
- Thomas Jefferson Raiders (3A)
- Todd Beamer Titans (3A)

Cascade

- Kennedy Lancers (4A)
- Kentlake Falcons (3A)
- Kent-Meridian Royals (3A)
- Kentridge Chargers (4A)
- Kentwood Conquerors (4A)
- Mt. Rainier Rams (4A)
- Tahoma Bears (4A)
- Stadium Tigers (4A)
- White River Hornets (3A)
- Enumclaw Hornets (3A)

South Puget Sound 4A

- Bethel Bison
- Bonney Lake Panthers
- Curtis Vikings^
- Emerald Ridge Jaguars
- Graham-Kapowsin Eagles
- Olympia Bears
- Puyallup Vikings
- Rogers Rams
- South Kitsap Wolves
- Spanaway Lake Sentinels
- Sumner Spartans
- Yelm Tornados

Puget Sound League 3A

- Capital Cougars
- Central Kitsap Cougars
- Gig Harbor Tides
- North Thurston Rams
- Peninsula Seahawks
- River Ridge Hawks
- Timberline Blazers
- Lakes Lancers
- Lincoln Abes
- Mt. Tahoma Thunderbirds
- Silas Rams
- Bellarmine Prep Lions

South Puget Sound 2A

- Eatonville Cruisers
- Fife Trojans
- Foss Falcons
- Franklin Pierce Cardinals
- Washington Patriots
- Clover Park Warriors
- Orting Cardinals
- Steilacoom Sentinels

Olympic 1A/2A

- Bremerton Knights (2A)
- Kingston Buccaneers (2A)
- North Kitsap Vikings (2A)
- North Mason Bulldogs (2A)
- Olympic Trojans (2A)
- Port Angeles Roughriders (2A)
- Sequim Wolves (2A)
- Bainbridge Island Spartans (2A)

Nisqually 1A

- Annie Wright Gators
- Bellevue Christian Vikings
- Cascade Christian Cougars
- Charles Wright Tarriers
- Seattle Christian Warriors
- Vashon Island Pirates
- Port Townsend Redhawks
- Klahowya Eagles
- Life Christian Eagles
- East Jefferson Rivals

North Olympic 1B

- Chief Kitsap Academy Bears
- Clallam Bay Bruins
- Crescent Loggers
- Neah Bay Red Devils

=== Southwest Washington District Four ===
The Southwest District, as its name suggests, includes schools south of the Olympic Mountains and west of the Cascade Range. The Washington School for the Blind (1B), Three Rivers Christian (1B), King's Way Christian (1B), Maple Lane High School (1A), and Vancouver School of Arts and Academics (1A) are independents.

Southwest Washington District Four league alignments

Greater St. Helens 3A/4A

- Battle Ground Tigers (4A)
- Camas Papermakers (4A)
- Heritage Timberwolves (3A)
- Skyview Storm (4A)
- Union Titans (4A)
- Evergreen Plainsmen (3A)
- Kelso Hilanders (3A)
- Mountain View Thunder (3A)
- Prairie Falcons (3A)

Greater St. Helens 2A

- Columbia River Rapids
- Hockinson Hawks
- Mark Morris Monarchs
- R. A. Long Lumberjacks
- Ridgefield Spudders
- Washougal Panthers
- Woodland Beavers
- Hudson's Bay Eagles

Evergreen 2A

- Aberdeen Bobcats
- Black Hills Wolves
- Centralia Tigers
- Tumwater Thunderbirds
- W.F. West Bearcats
- Shelton Highclimbers

Evergreen 1A

- Elma Eagles
- Hoquiam Grizzlies
- Montesano Bulldogs
- Rochester Warriors
- Tenino Beavers

Trico 1A

- Castle Rock Rockets
- Fort Vancouver Trappers
- Kalama Chinooks
- King's Way Knights
- La Center Wildcats
- Seton Catholic Cougars
- Stevenson Bulldogs
- Columbia (White Salmon) Bruins

Pacific 2B

- Chief Leschi Warriors
- Forks Spartans
- Ilwaco Fishermen
- North Beach Hyaks
- Northwest Christian Wolverines
- Ocosta Wildcats
- Raymond Seagulls
- South Bend High School

Central 2B

- Adna Pirates
- Morton-White Pass Timberwolves
- Napavine Tigers
- Onalaska Loggers
- Mossyrock Vikings
- Rainier Mountaineers
- Toledo Riverhawks
- Toutle Lake Ducks
- Winlock Cardinals

Columbia Valley 1B

- Columbia Adventist Kodiaks
- Firm Foundation Eagles
- Naselle Comets
- Three Rivers Christian Eagles
- Washington School for the Deaf Terriers
- Pe Ell Trojans
- Wahkiakum Mules
- Willapa Valley Titans

Coastal 1B

- Lake Quinault Elks
- Mary M. Knight Owls
- North River Mustangs
- Oakville Acorns
- Taholah Chitwin
- Wishkah Valley Loggers

=== Yakima Valley District Five ===
The Yakima Valley District includes schools in south central Washington. The schools are divided into five leagues.

Yakima Valley District Five league alignments

CWAC 2A

- East Valley Red Devils
- Ellensburg Bulldogs
- Ephrata Tigers (District 6)
- Grandview Greyhounds
- Othello Huskies
- Prosser Mustangs
- Selah Vikings

SCAC 1A

- LaSalle Lightning
- Naches Valley Rangers
- Zillah Leopards
- College Place Hawks
- Connell Eagles
- Kiona-Benton Bears
- Royal Knights
- Wahluke Warriors
- Toppenish Wildcats
- Wapato Wolves

EWAC 2B 2B

- Columbia Coyotes
- Dayton/Waitsburg Bulldogs
- Kittitas Coyotes
- Mabton Vikings
- Tri-Cities Prep Jaguars
- Walla Walla Valley Academy Knights
- White Swan Cougars
- Warden Cougars
- River View Panthers
- Cle Elum-Roslyn Warriors
- Goldendale Timberwolves
- Granger Spartans
- Highland Scots

Greater Columbia Gorge 1B

- Sunnyside Christian Knights (Southeast 1B for football only)
- Trout Lake Mustangs
- Yakima Tribal School Eagles

=== North Central District Six ===
North Central District Six league alignments

Columbia Basin Big-9 4A

- A.C. Davis Pirates
- Eastmont Wildcats
- Eisenhower Cadets
- Moses Lake Mavericks
- Sunnyside Grizzlies
- Wenatchee Panthers
- West Valley Rams

Caribou Trail 1A

- Cascade (Leavenworth) Kodiaks
- Cashmere Bulldogs
- Chelan Goats
- Quincy Jackrabbits
- Omak Pioneers

Central Washington 2B

- Brewster Bears
- Bridgeport Mustangs
- Lake Roosevelt Raiders
- Liberty Bell Mountain Lions
- Manson Trojans
- Oroville Hornets
- Soap Lake Eagles
- Okanogan Bulldogs
- Tonasket Tigers

Central Washington 1B

- Cascade Christian Academy Wolverines
- Easton Jaguars
- Entiat Tigers
- Waterville-Mansfield Shockers
- Moses Lake Christian Academy Lions
- Pateros Billygoats and Nannies
- Riverside Christian Crusaders (District 5)
- Wilson Creek Devils

=== Northeast District Seven ===
Northeast District Seven league alignments

Northeast 1A

- Colville Crimson Hawks
- Lakeside (9 Mile Falls) Eagles
- Medical Lake Cardinals
- Riverside Rams

Northeast 2B

- Asotin Panthers
- Colfax Bulldogs
- Davenport Gorillas
- Freeman Scotties
- Jenkins (Chewelah) Cougars
- Kettle Falls Bulldogs
- Liberty Lancers
- Lind-Ritzville-Sprague-Washtucna-Kahlotus Broncos
- Mary Walker Chargers
- Newport (Newport) Grizzlies
- Northwest Christian Crusaders
- Reardan Screaming Eagles
- St. George's Dragons
- Upper Columbia Lions
- Wilbur-Creston Wildcats

Northeast 1B

- Almira Coulee Hartline Warriors
- Columbia Lions
- Curlew Cougars
- Cusick Panthers
- Inchelium Hornets
- Northport Mustangs
- Odessa-Harrington Titans
- Republic Tigers
- Selkirk Rangers
- Valley Christian Panthers
- Wellpinit Redskins

=== Greater Spokane/Mid-Columbia District Eight ===
The Greater Spokane League was formed in 1925 as the Spokane City League and became the GSL in 1976. District 8 was created to separate the larger schools (then AAA) from the smaller schools in District 7. Schools that dropped to 2A therefore leave the GSL and District 8, to the Great Northern League (GNL, formerly Frontier League) in District 7. Consequently, schools have gone through great lengths to remain in the league and maintain historic rivalries. Gonzaga Prep opts-up to 4A, despite having 2A enrollment numbers. For the 2020–21 school year, Cheney moved up to 3A; with only four teams left in the GNL, that league was folded and absorbed into a new GSL 2A division.

Greater Spokane District Eight league alignments

Mid-Columbia 3A/4A

- Chiawana Riverhawks (4A)
- Hanford Falcons (4A)
- Pasco Bulldogs (4A)
- Richland Bombers (4A)
- Walla Walla Blue Devils (3A)
- Kamiakin Braves (4A)
- Kennewick Lions (3A)
- Southridge Suns (3A)
- Hermiston Bulldogs (3A)

Greater Spokane 2A/3A/4A

- Central Valley Bears (3A)
- Cheney Blackhawks (3A)
- Clarkston Bantams (2A)
- Deer Park Stags (2A)
- East Valley Knights (2A)
- Ferris Saxons (3A)
- Gonzaga Prep Bullpups (4A)
- Lewis & Clark Tigers (4A)
- Mead Panthers (4A)
- Mt. Spokane Wildcats (3A)
- North Central Indians (3A)
- Pullman Greyhounds (2A)
- Ridgeline Falcons (3A)
- Rogers Pirates (2A)
- Shadle Park Highlanders (3A)
- University Titans (3A)
- West Valley Eagles (2A)

=== Southeast District Nine ===
Southeast District Nine league alignment

Southeast 1B/2B

- Colton Wildcats
- Garfield-Palouse Vikings
- Pomeroy Pirates
- Prescott Tigers
- St. John-Endicott/LaCrosse Eagles
- Touchet Indians

== Neighboring states (and province) ==
- Oregon School Activities Association
- Idaho High School Activities Association
- British Columbia School Sports (Canada)
