= Prevent Together: Battle Ground Prevention Alliance =

Youth drug prevention coalition

Battle Ground Prevention Alliance
- Nickname: Prevent Together
- Formation: 2012
- Purpose: Youth substance abuse prevention
- Headquarters: City of Battle Ground: 109 SW 1ST Street, Suite 262, Battle Ground, WA 98604
- Executive Director: Jennifer Kirby
- Website: PreventTogetherBG.org

Prevent Together: Battle Ground Prevention Alliance (BGPA) is a community-based youth drug prevention coalition and a 501c3 charitable nonprofit in Battle Ground, Washington. Its primary mission is to prevent youth substance abuse and misuse by youth in the Battle Ground community, doing so by educating and building a relationship with students and community members. Battle Ground Prevention Alliance receives a majority of its funding from grants, and was notably the recipient of the Centers for Disease Control and Prevention's Drug Free Communities grant in 2020.

== History ==
Prevent Together: Battle Ground Prevention Alliance was founded in 2012 out of a partnership between the ESD 112-operated PREVENT Coalition and the Battle Ground Prevention-Intervention Advisory Board.

== DREAM Team ==
The DREAM Team (Dedicated, Remarkable, Enlightened, Adolescents, Making a Difference) is the youth extension of Prevent Together that operates out of three schools in the Battle Ground Public Schools boundary.

The Chief Umtuch, Tukes Valley, and Pleasant Valley middle school DREAM Team groups work to achieve the same mission as the nonprofit by hosting activities and events such as Prevention Convention: The Way to Wellness and the Clark County Spring Youth Forum. The youth-based teams also participate in larger events like Prevention Policy Day and the Battle Ground Police Department's Drug Take-Back Day.

In 2023, the Chief Umtuch DREAM Team won top-honors at the Washington State Healthcare Authority's Spring Youth Forum and was awarded a $5,000 scholarship to help the students move on to Washington, D.C..
