= Skyward (disambiguation) =

Skyward may refer to:

- Skyward, an American software company for school management and municipality management technologies
- Skyward (film), a 1980 American film directed by Ron Howard
- Skyward (novel), a 2018 American young adult science fiction novel by Brandon Sanderson
- Skyward Express, a private airline operating in Kenya
- Joe Skyward, American bass player
- Skyward, a 2017 streaming film directed by Jonathan Judge
- Skyward, an Image Comics series of 15 episodes

== See also ==
- Skywards
