= MLHS =

MLHS may refer to:

- Manitowoc Lutheran High School, Manitowoc, Wisconsin, United States
- Medical Lake High School, Medical Lake, Washington, United States
- Milwaukee Lutheran High School, Milwaukee, Wisconsin, United States
- Mountain Lakes High School, Mountain Lakes, New Jersey, United States
- MLHS, the Indian Railways station code for Light House railway station, Chennai, Tamil Nadu, India
