= Linda Ham =

NASA manager related to the Columbia shuttle disaster

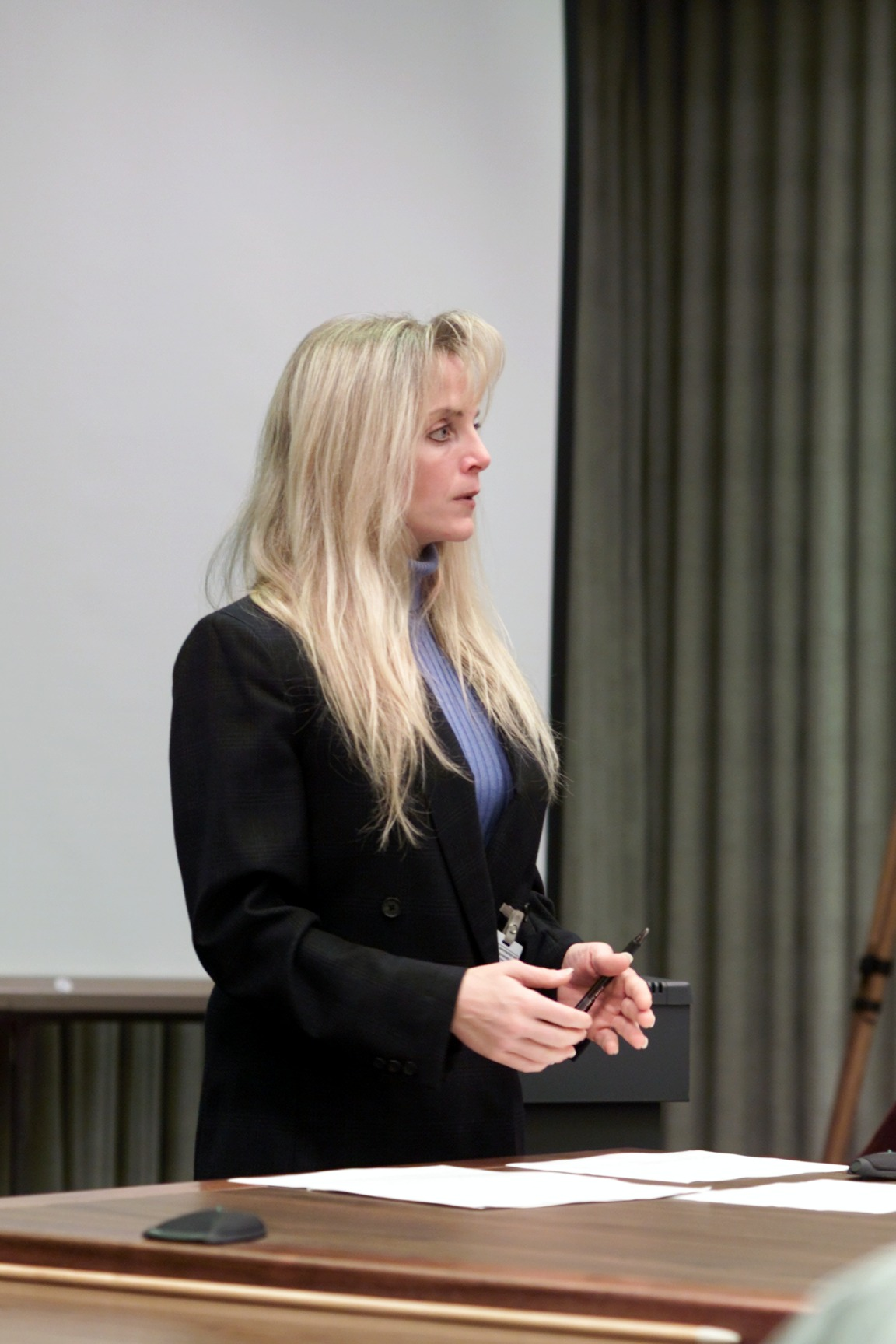
Linda Ham addresses the Columbia Accident Investigation Board following the loss of Space Shuttle Columbia on February 1, 2003

Linda Ham (née Hautzinger) is a former Constellation Program Transition and Technology Infusion Manager at NASA. She was formerly the program integration manager in the NASA Space Shuttle Program Office and acting manager for launch integration. In this position, she chaired the mission management team for all shuttle flights between 2001 and 2003, including shuttle mission STS-107 that ended with the catastrophic destruction of Columbia upon its planned reentry into the Earth's atmosphere.

Ham's actions and decisions, along with those of several other senior NASA managers involved in mission STS-107, were discussed and criticized repeatedly in the official Columbia Accident Investigation Board report, often in the context of management actions, practices or culture that contributed to the disaster. Neither she nor anyone else was individually blamed in the report for the deaths of the seven Columbia astronauts, but she was singled out for exhibiting an attitude of avoiding inspection and assessment of actual shuttle damage. Ham's attitude, and her dismissal of dissenting points of view from engineers, was identified as part of a larger cultural problem at NASA. After the report's release, Ham was transferred out of her management position in the Space Shuttle program.

== Early career ==
Born as Linda Hautzinger, Ham grew up outside Kenosha, Wisconsin. She graduated from the University of Wisconsin–Parkside in 1982 with degrees in mathematics and applied science. Soon after graduation, at 21 years of age, she applied to and was hired by NASA.

Ham's first position at NASA was as a propulsion systems flight controller at the Lyndon B. Johnson Space Center in Houston, Texas. This was a "back room" position where she offered real-time specialist advice and support to the propulsion engineer, a flight controller in Mission Control. She was soon promoted to the position of propulsion officer in Mission Control itself, the first female to hold that position. In 1990, she married U.S. Navy pilot and NASA astronaut Kenneth Ham, with whom she had two sons, Ryan and Randy. As one of her superiors, Ron Dittemore, later commented, "she had so much talent and her intellect was so strong she could compete with the best in assessing the facts. She rose through the ranks fast at a young age because of her ability to assimilate information".

Ham received her M.S. in Astronautical Engineering from Naval Postgraduate School in 1996 on a NASA fellowship and also an MBA from Rice University in 2006.

== Flight director ==
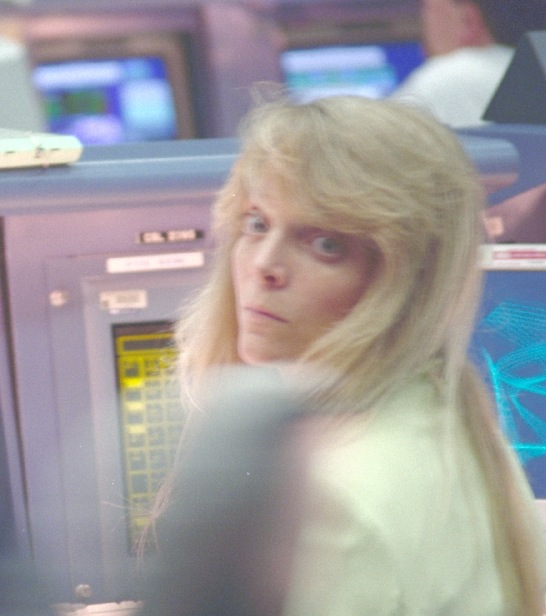
Linda Ham as ascent flight director on the launch day of STS-95

Ham was one of the first women to serve as NASA flight director. The first mission she worked as flight director was STS-45, which was launched on March 24, 1992. During her first three missions, all of which took place in 1992, she was assigned to the "Orbit 3" shift. For STS-58, launched October 18, 1993, she moved up to lead flight director. Although Ham applied for astronaut training, she was not selected because of issues with her eyesight.

Ham worked three missions in 1997 and 1998 as the ascent/entry flight director. One of these was STS-95, on which United States Senator John Glenn (D-Ohio) flew as a payload specialist.

In 1999, Ham served as lead flight director on the STS-103 mission. Launched on December 19, 1999, it involved servicing the gyroscopes of the aging Hubble Space Telescope. The mission was a success and all its objectives were met.

== Manager ==
In 2000, Ham was promoted into a position in the Space Shuttle Program Office as technical assistant to the shuttle program manager. In 2001, she became the Shuttle program's integration manager, one of six senior managers responsible for Shuttle program operations. In this position, Ham chaired the mission management team (MMT) meetings that oversaw Shuttle flights while in orbit and reported directly to the Shuttle program manager, Ron Dittemore. At the time of the Columbia mission, Ham was also serving as acting manager of Shuttle launch integration, which the Columbia Accident Investigation Board (CAIB) called "a dual role promoting a conflict of interest".

== Columbia disaster and investigation report ==
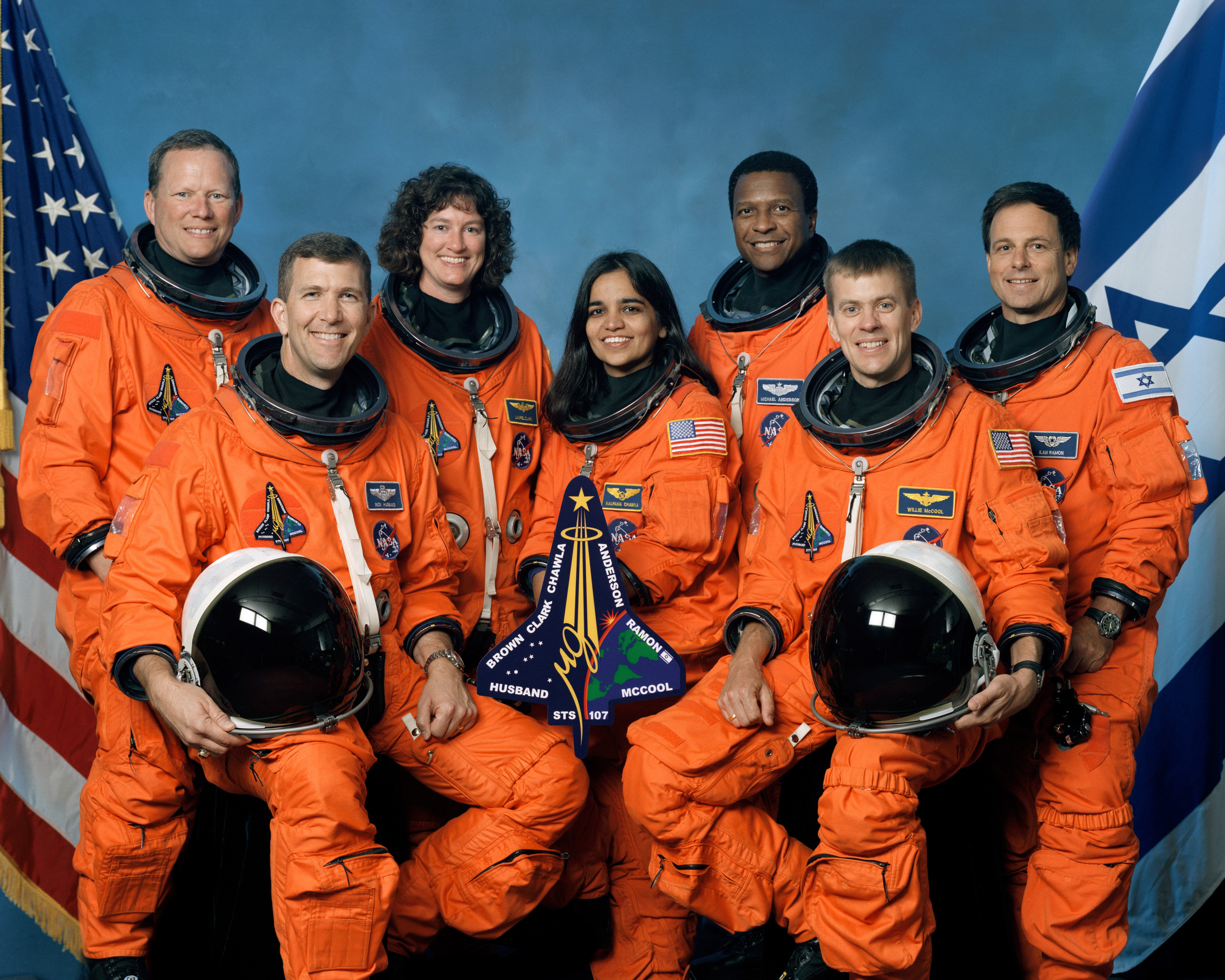
The crew of Columbia mission STS-107

Mission STS-107, the 113th mission of the Space Shuttle program and the 28th flight of Columbia, lifted off January 16, 2003 from the John F. Kennedy Space Center in Florida on a 16-day dedicated science mission. A large piece of insulating foam separated from the Shuttle's external tank left bipod ramp area 82 seconds after launch and struck Columbia on the leading edge of the left wing. Two days later, after reviewing film of the launch and detecting the foam impact on the left wing, NASA engineers made a request to shuttle program managers for an in-orbit, high-resolution image of the Columbia's left wing to check for damage. The shuttle program managers declined the engineers' request to image the shuttle's wing before reentry.

At 9:00:18 a.m. Eastern Standard Time during reentry on February 1, 2003, Columbia disintegrated over Texas, killing all seven members of its crew. According to one source, a total of three requests were made and rejected for imagery of Columbia in-orbit during the 16-day mission. In addition, the CAIB identified eight missed opportunities to determine the extent of the damage, all of which either got no response from mission management or resulted in no action being taken. The first of these was an inquiry on the fourth day of the mission by the chief engineer of Thermal Protection Systems as to whether the crew had been asked to inspect the damage; no answer was received from lower levels of management. The opinion of the managers that the debris strike was only a maintenance-level concern was established early in the mission, making it increasingly difficult for concerned engineers to be heard by those with decision-making authority. As mentioned in the CAIB report:

In the face of Mission managers' low level of concern and desire to get on with the mission ... the engineers found themselves in the unusual position of having to prove that the situation was unsafe—a reversal of the usual requirement to prove that a situation is safe.

The CAIB report released August 26, 2003 concluded that the physical cause of the destruction of Columbia was damage to the shuttle's left wing caused by the foam strike during launch. The board also determined that several organizational and human factors contributed to the disaster. These included:

Reliance on past success as substitute for sound engineering practices; organizational barriers that prevented effective communication of critical safety information and stifled professional differences of opinion; lack of integrated management across program elements; and the evolution of an informal chain of command and decision-making processes that operated outside the organization's rules.

It was in the context of these organizational factors that the CAIB discussed the role of decisions made by Ham, as well as by other NASA managers, in contributing to the disaster.

According to the book Comm Check... by William Harwood and Michael Cabbage, some engineers were concerned that the foam strike on the left wing, clearly captured by video recorded during the launch, had caused more damage than initially thought. Based on computer modeling later proven inadequate, Ham's belief was that the damage was not serious and would at most merely lengthen the time necessary to refurbish Columbia between missions. Ham denied requests for high-resolution imaging of the shuttle based on her belief that the damage was too minor to be of consequence. Former flight director Wayne Hale worked outside proper NASA channels in an effort to get imaging of the damage.

Ham's on-the-job persona was reported to be somewhat brusque and she was perceived by some below her in the chain of command as being reluctant to embrace dissenting points of view. This was part of a larger cultural problem within NASA that was addressed at length by the CAIB. Even if the hole in the left wing had been discovered immediately, according to flight director LeRoy Cain, there were few if any realistic options to either circumvent the damage or launch a rescue mission, although some options were worked out later. One option was detailed in Appendix D-13 of the Report of CAIB, which would have involved the Columbia crew adopting a state of low activity to save consumables while Atlantis was launched.

== Aftermath of Columbia investigation ==
On July 3, 2003, NASA's new Space Shuttle program manager, William Parsons, reassigned three senior engineers who had been involved in the Columbia disaster, including Ham. NASA administrator Sean O'Keefe took the opportunity to praise Ham publicly, saying that the reassignment was "no reflection, in my judgment, on the competence or diligence or commitment or professionalism of anybody...." According to The Washington Post, "O'Keefe said she is so talented there is going to be a 'bidding war' for her among NASA facilities".

Ham's new position was as assistant to Frank Benz, director of engineering at the Johnson Space Center. In December 2003, she served as executive liaison from NASA to the National Renewable Energy Laboratory in Golden, Colorado, where she worked on federal plans for the storage and distribution of hydrogen fuel.
