= Washington K-20 Network =

Washington K-20 Network is a wide area network providing educational Internet access in the U.S. state of Washington for schools and educational service districts, colleges and community colleges, and libraries. The network was formed in 1996. A state settlement with Qwest Communications funded network access to state libraries starting in 2000–2001. WWAMI medical schools began to participate in 2007.

The network was connected to Internet2 via Pacific Northwest Gigapop in 2001.

== Network ==
As of 2013, the network had over 475 nodes, including almost 450 schools and colleges, and 30 libraries or library systems.

== See also ==
- Washington School Information Processing Cooperative

== Book sources ==
- Littman, M.K. (2002). Building Broadband Networks. CRC Press. p. 28. ISBN 978-1-4200-0001-6.
- Crampton, F.E.; Thompson, D.C. (2003). Saving America's School Infrastructure. Research in education fiscal policy and practice. Information Age Pub. ISBN 978-1-931576-17-8.
