= Washington School Information Processing Cooperative =

Public non-profit cooperative

- Formation: 1967
- Type: Public Agency
- Purpose: Technology for Educational Communities
- Location: Everett, Washington, USA
- Key people: Dana Anderson (CEO)
- Website: www.wsipc.org

The Washington School Information Processing Cooperative (WSIPC) is a public agency cooperative that provides K-12 public and private schools with various services. WSIPC services schools throughout the northwest in Washington, Oregon, Idaho, Montana, and Alaska, providing benefits to 9 Educational Service Districts and more than 300 school districts, who represent over 1 million students.

WSIPC serves school districts with complete information management systems for fiscal, human resources as well as a full student information system (SIS) data. The main software package deployed by WSIPC is the Skyward School Management System.

Starting in 2009 WSIPC was given the sole responsibility to host WASWUG Spring and WASWUG Fall, two conferences that are in place for WSIPC members to learn more about the Skyward product suite and attend breakout sessions.

== History ==
In 1967, ten Washington school districts formed a cooperative to share software development and hardware costs, and provide centralized technological support. The result of this collaboration was WSIPC, a public agency that continues to provide information services at a low cost to school districts in the northwest.

WSIPC registered the domain name WEDNET.EDU in 1992 in order to begin connecting all public schools in Washington state. This eventually became the nation's first statewide high-speed, high-capacity network for schools, which was made possible by WSIPC joining the Washington K-20 Network in 2000. This linked colleges, universities, K-12 school districts and libraries statewide, resulting in more bandwidth and connectivity with schools. According to the K-20 Biennial Report of December 2006, joining the network "enabled WSIPC and the ESDs to serve local districts more effectively" because without it, each school district would have been left to find a locally delivered system.

Initially, WSIPC had developed their own Enterprise Resource Planning (ERP) application in-house, called WISE, which not only provided a complete SIS, but also information management for both finance and student data. Starting in 2001 WSIPC collaborated with Skyward and, as a result, completely restructured the computing infrastructure at WSIPC, replacing the legacy application offerings with one integrated ERP application provided to WSIPC customers. WSIPC called its ERP application WESPaC (WSIPC Enhanced Skyward Point and Click) which included Skyward's software suite of student, human resources and financial management modules. WESPaC also included Citrix's MetaFrame which provided users with remote access. Skyward eventually converted its thick client student application into a web interface and part of its finance software to have a web front end. The other part of their finance software is still thick client. Therefore, WESPaC has now evolved into two applications, one being a web-based student application and the other being a finance application that is partly web-based and partly thick client. Both of these applications are currently provided by Skyward.

In 2003 WSIPC provided a case study for Citrix stating the revenue saved over 5 years, which amounted to almost $54 million. It stated that implementing Citrix has helped WSIPC "cut costs, rapidly deploy and centrally manage the Skyward application, roll out updates immediately, and provide for a more stable operating environment." By the end of 2004, the entire WSIPC user base began using Citrix. This software company currently enables WSIPC to centrally deploy and manage their applications, also allowing their finance software (or PaC) to be accessed via a variety of client devices. This, in turn, offers a management infrastructure that requires little management on the school district's part.

In 2014, WSIPC launched a web application it had developed called My School Data that provides access to student data and assessment information in a dashboard format.

== WASWUG ==
WASWUG is an annual gathering where WSIPC members can learn more about the Skyward product suite, share insights and network. Throughout the three-day conference there are over 175 breakout sessions offered within the Student, HR and Fiscal Modules. These sessions are taught by the WSIPC Staff and power end users.

The WASWUG Conference first began in 2005 with hosting duties being rotated among various Washington State Education Service Districts. The total attendance of the first conference was over 800. The attendance has increased to over 1400 attendees by 2014. From 2009 onward, WSIPC was given the sole responsibility to arrange and organize WASWUG.

WASWUG Fall was an additional yearly conference that was added in 2015. It was located in Spokane, WA in order to better reach districts in eastern Washington, Oregon, Idaho, Alaska and Montana. The original conference was rebranded as WASWUG Spring typically with a specific theme every year and is currently located in Bellevue, WA.

In 2020 the WASWUG conference pivoted to a virtual conference to meet the needs of our users during the pandemic.

In 2022 the annual WASWUG Spring and Fall conferences were combined into one annual hybrid conference, held each year in March.
