= Ron Dittemore =

American NASA official (born 1952)

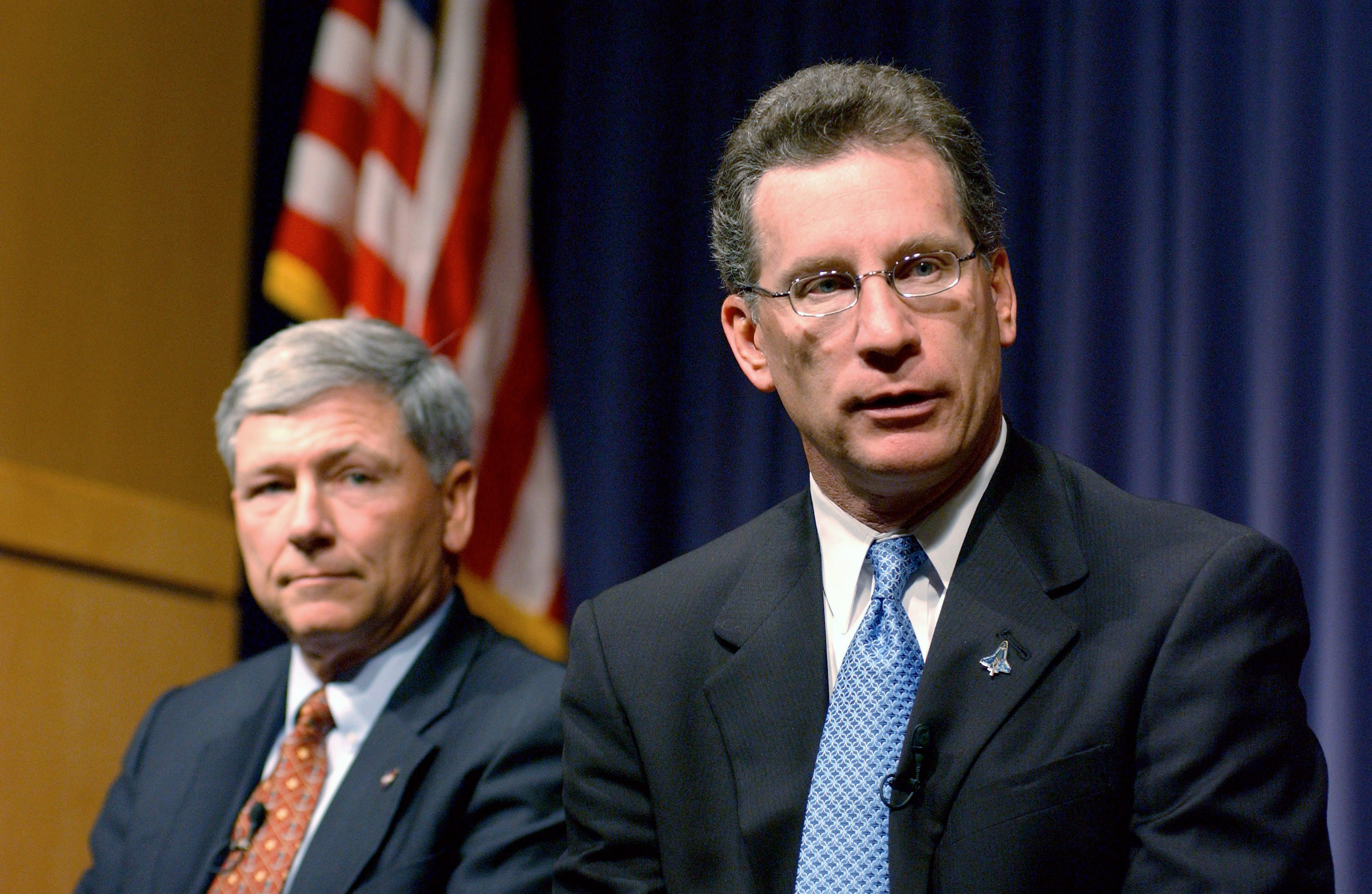
- Dittemore (right) in 2003
- Born: Ron D. Dittemore; April 13, 1952 (age 74); Cooperstown, New York, U.S.
- Education: Medical Lake High School; University of Washington
- Occupation: Space Shuttle program manager for NASA (retired)
- Spouse: Shirley Ann Seibolts
- Children: 2

Ron D. Dittemore (born April 13, 1952 Cooperstown, New York) is a former Space Shuttle program manager for NASA. He was the shuttle program manager during the timeframe of the Space Shuttle Columbia disaster. He later served as President of ATK Launch Systems Group. He is currently retired.

== Education ==
Ron Dittemore graduated from Medical Lake High School in Medical Lake, Washington in 1970. He received a bachelor's degree in aeronautical and astronautical engineering from the University of Washington in 1974, and a master's degree in the same subjects one year later.

== Career ==
Before joining NASA at Johnson Space Center (JSC) in 1977, Dittemore worked as a turboprop/turbofan engine development engineer in Arizona. While at JSC, Dittemore held several positions, including flight director on 11 Space Shuttle missions, deputy assistant director of the Space Station Program, and manager of Space Shuttle Program Integration. He assumed the position of manager of the Space Shuttle Program in 1999.

Dittemore was the Shuttle Program Manager for NASA at the time of the disastrous loss of Space Shuttle Columbia in February 2003. On February 5, 2003, Dittemore incorrectly asserted that foam debris from the shuttle's external tank that struck the left wing during the launch could not have caused the reentry disintegration of the shuttle. Dittemore announced his resignation from NASA in April 2003.

After leaving NASA, Dittemore became president of ATK Thiokol Propulsion, renamed ATK Launch Systems Group in May 2006, a division of Alliant Techsystems (ATK); Thiokol and NASA had been found responsible, in the 1986 report of the Rogers Commission Report, for that year's Space Shuttle Challenger disaster, which also resulted in the death of seven astronauts. As of 2024, the then 72-year-old Dittemore is retired.

== Personal ==
Ron Dittemore is married to Shirley Ann Seibolts. They have two children. Dittemore is a member of the Church of Jesus Christ of Latter-day Saints.
