= Pope John Paul II High School (Washington) =

School in Lacey, Washington, United States

Location
- 5608 Pacific Avenue SE; Lacey, (Thurston County), Washington 98503; United States; 47°02′14″N 122°48′31″W

Information
- Type: Private, co-educational
- Motto: Stewards of the Future
- Religious affiliation: Catholic Christian
- Patron saint: Pope John Paul II
- Established: 2010
- School district: Archdiocese of Seattle
- Principal: Braeden Neal
- Head of school: Braeden Neal
- Faculty: 18
- Teaching staff: 10
- Grades: 9–12
- Student to teacher ratio: 11:1
- Colors: Blue and gold
- Slogan: To live in the light and truth of Jesus, now and forever
- Athletics: Volleyball, Cross country, Boys and Girls Basketball, Track and Field, Fastpitch softball, Basketball, Baseball
- Mascot: Eagle
- Nickname: JPII, JP2
- Website: popejp2hs.org

Pope John Paul II High School, frequently called JPII or JP2 by its community, is a private, four-year, college-preparatory, Catholic high school, named after John Paul II, who was Pope of the Catholic Church from 1978 until his death in 2005, and canonized in 2014. The school is located in Lacey, Washington, within the Archdiocese of Seattle.

== History ==
Pope John Paul II High School opened in 2010. The school was conceived to provide a Catholic high school experience in the South Puget Sound region of Washington State.

== Academics ==
JPII offers 18 honors, AP and college credit courses. Four years of theology, math, and English and three years of science are required for graduation. The school requires 26 credits for graduation and operates on a weighted grading scale for internal GPA calculations.

Pope John Paul II High School has been recognized by Niche as the Top Private School and Top STEM School in Thurston County.

== Co-curricular activities ==
=== Athletics ===
The school competes at 1B designation in WIAA. Over 70% of students participate in at least one sport. JPII has six sports including boys and girls cross country, girls volleyball, boys and girls basketball, boys and girls track & field, baseball, and fastpitch. It also has a non-competitive, co-ed cheer squad.

=== Clubs and other co-curriculars ===
JPII has an FBLA chapter, National Honor Society chapter, StellarXplorers teams, Knowledge Bowl teams, as well as a drama, robotics and multicultural club among others.

== Community service ==
As part of the curriculum required for graduation, JPII students are required to complete 80 service hours for the marginalized over their four years at the school.

== Religion ==
Theology classes are required for every student, across all four years of high school. The school is not affiliated with a parish. Students attend Mass together once a month. Every student will be able to participate in yearly, grade-level retreats.
