= Warden High School =

Coordinates: 46°57′37″N 119°02′35″W

Location
- 101 W Beck Way; Warden, Washington 98857; United States

Information
- Type: Public
- Principal: Heather Cheek
- Staff: 15.47 (FTE)
- Grades: 9-12
- Enrollment: 286 (2022–23)
- Student to teacher ratio: 18.49
- Colors: Blue & White
- Mascot: Cougar

Warden High School, located within the Warden School District in Warden, Washington, is a comprehensive high school. The school is accredited by the Association of Educational Service Districts. The current enrollment is about 290 students of which 30 are taking college level English. The school has 14 full time general education teachers, two special education teachers, and three teachers that are shared with the middle school. The principal is Katie Phipps and their mascot is the Cougar.

== Sports offered ==
Warden High School competes in the Central Washington League under WIAA 1A Classification in the following sports:

- Football
- Volleyball
- Soccer (Boys & Girls)
- Wrestling (Boys & Girls)
- Basketball (Boys & Girls)
- Baseball
- Softball
- Golf (Boys & Girls)

=== State championships ===
Well known for wrestling, Warden has 8 state championships under head coach and Hall of Fame member, Rick Bowers.

Champions in: 1983, 1986, 1998, 2002, 2003, 2004, 2005, 2011, 2012
