= Valley Christian School (Spokane Valley, Washington) =

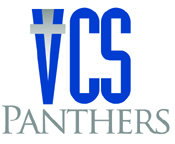

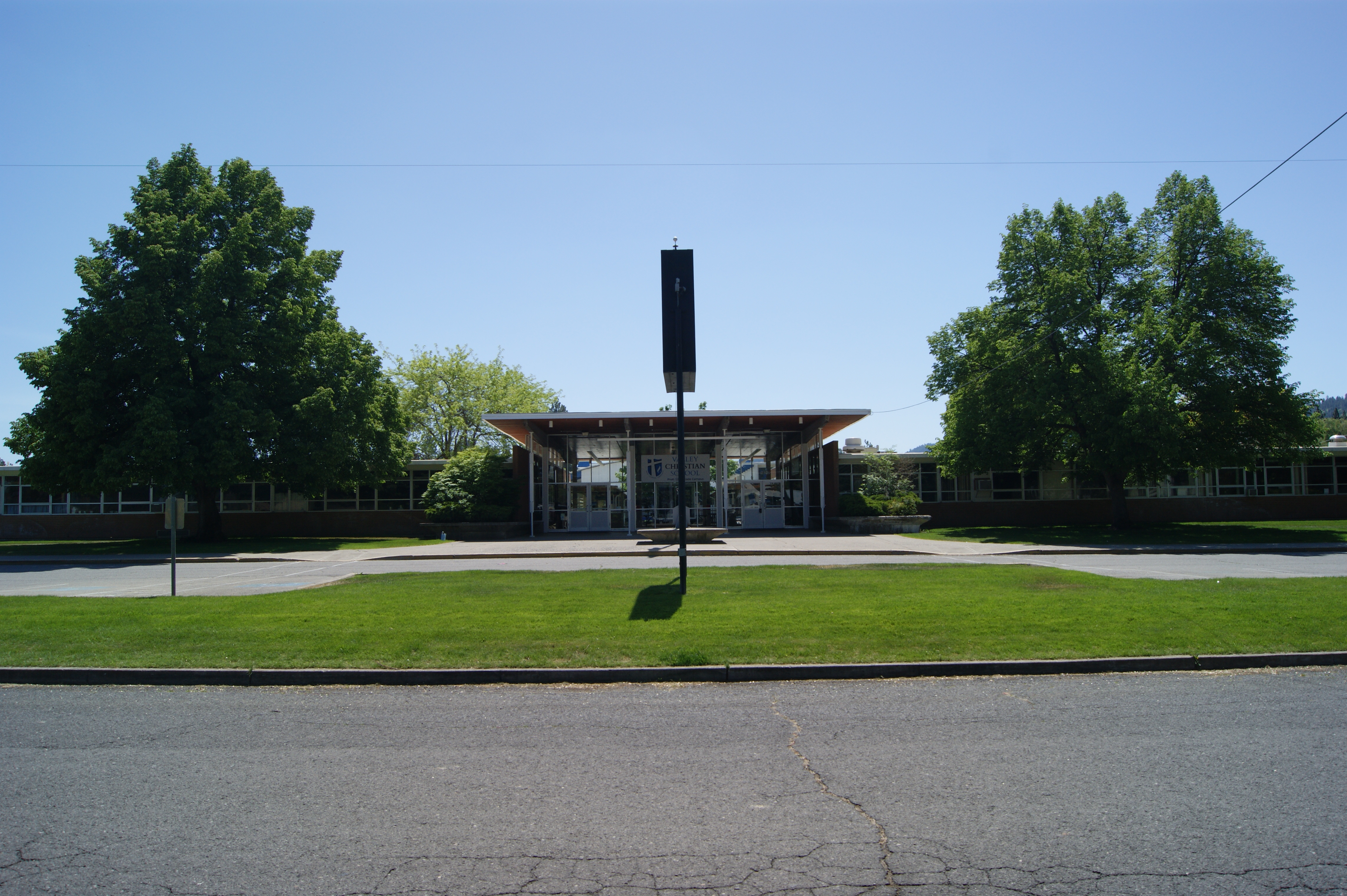

Location
- 10212 E 9th Avenue; Spokane Valley, Washington 99206; United States; 47.6469°N 117.2671°W

Information
- Type: Private
- Motto: Faith, Learning, Community
- Established: 1975; 51 years ago
- NCES School ID: A0903775
- Administrator: Derick Tabish
- Grades: PreK to 12
- Enrollment: 618 (2023-24)
- Colors: Blue, Gray, Black and White
- Mascot: Panthers
- Nickname: VCS
- Website: valleychristianschool.org

Valley Christian School is a private Christian school located in Spokane Valley, Washington, United States.

The school was founded in 1975 on the premises of Valley Fourth Church in Spokane Valley. It has since re-located to the building complex that was previously used by University High School. It is a non-denominational, non-profit 501C3 school. It is accredited by Northwest Accreditation Commission (NWAC). It is approved by the State of Washington and enrolls students in grades PreK-12.

The school promotes itself as providing a biblical worldview education for Christian families desiring a discipleship based Christian day school. The school maintains maximum class sizes of 25 in the elementary and 30 in the secondary, with an average class of 18 students.

On July 27, 2017, the school purchased the old University building that it been leasing for ten years at a price of $4.41 million from the Central Valley School District.

The school's Knowledge Bowl team were state championships in 2013 and 2022. In the early 2020s, the school's cross country and track and field programs began to grow as well, culminating in back-to-back state championships for both of the men's teams in the 2023–24 and 2024-25 school years.

== Extracurriculars ==
Valley Christian School competes in District 7 in the 1B Division of the Washington Interscholastic Activities Association (WIAA). The school has men's teams in cross country, basketball, and track and field, along with women's teams in volleyball, cross country, basketball, and track and field. Sports rivalries for the school include those against Northwest Christian School, Wellpinit High School, and Almira-Coulee-Hartline High School. The school also supports co-ed teams for knowledge bowl, band, and choir.
