= Spencer Hadley =

American football player (born 1989)

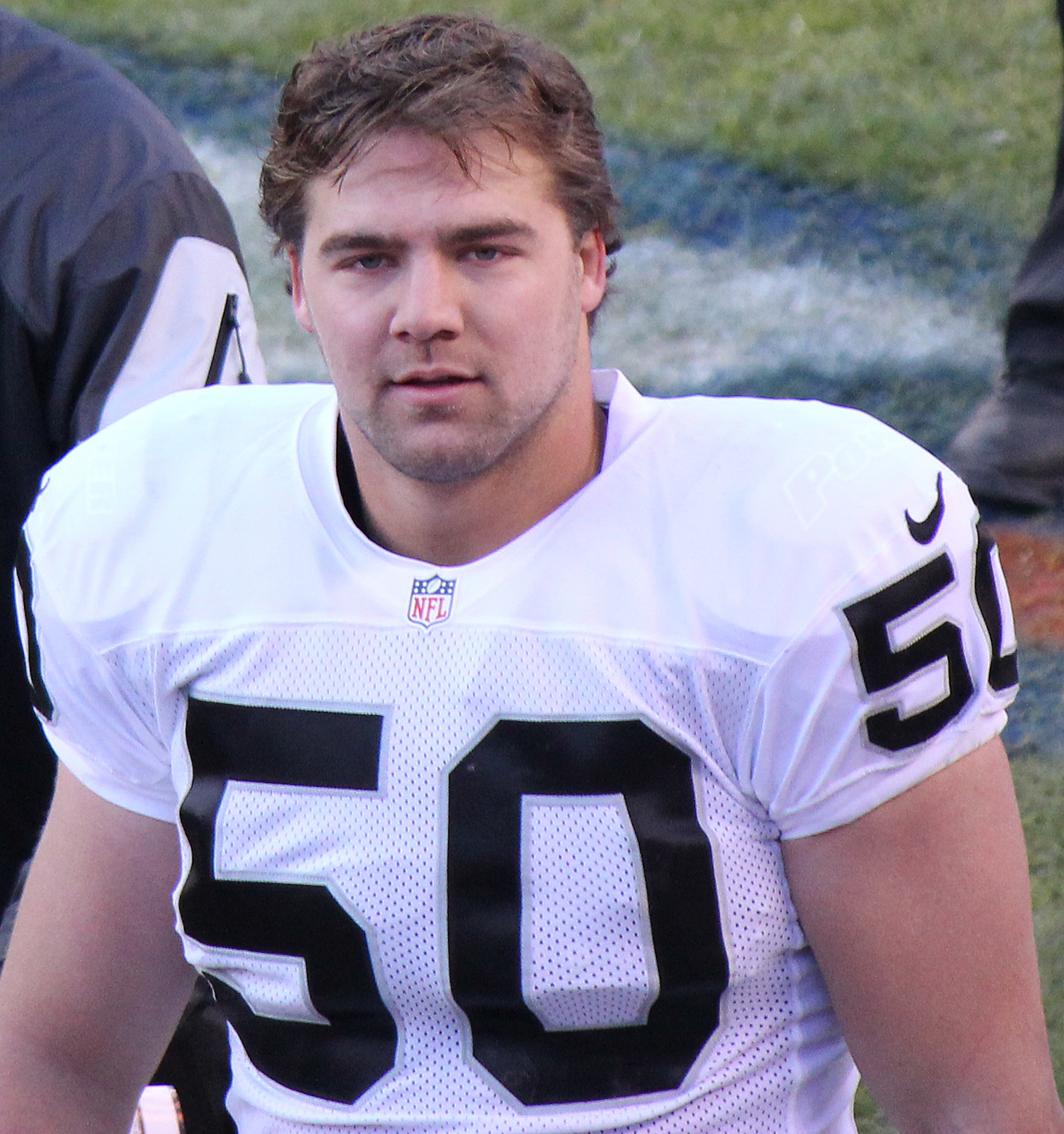
- Hadley in 2014

No. 50
- Position: Linebacker

Personal information
- Born: October 30, 1989 (age 37); Oberlin, Ohio, U.S.
- Listed height: 6 ft 1 in (1.85 m)
- Listed weight: 227 lb (103 kg)

Career information
- High school: Connell (WA)
- College: Brigham Young University
- NFL draft: 2014: undrafted

Career history
- New Orleans Saints (2014)*; Oakland Raiders (2014)
- * Offseason or practice squad member only

Career NFL statistics
- Games played: 2
- Stats at Pro Football Reference

Spencer Hadley (born October 30, 1989) is an American former professional football player who was a linebacker in the National Football League (NFL). He played college football for the BYU Cougars from 2008 to 2013. He served a two-year Mormon mission in the Rosevile California Mission from 2009 to 2010.

== Professional career ==
=== New Orleans Saints ===
Hadley was signed by the New Orleans Saints on May 12, 2014, but was later released.

=== Oakland Raiders ===
Hadley was signed by the Oakland Raiders on August 6, 2014, and was a member of the practice squad, up until December 20, 2014, when he was added to the active roster. He was waived September 5, 2015.
