= Knowledge Master Open =

Academic competition

The Knowledge Master Open (commonly known as Knowledge Masters or KMO) was a computer-based semiannual worldwide academic competition produced by Academic Hallmarks. During KMO competitions, teams of students from many schools earned points by answering multiple-choice questions quickly and accurately. The questions included 15 subject areas: American history, world history, government, recent events, economics & law, geography, literature, English, math, physical science, biology, earth science, health & psychology, fine arts, and useless trivia.

The competition started in 1983 with 74 schools. In 2009, there were about 45,000 participants from over 3,000 high schools and middle schools in the U.S. and other countries. The last contest occurred in April 2013. Over the 30 years of KMO competition, more than 2.4 million students participated.

There were five levels of competition. Fifth- and sixth-grade contests were held in January and March and consisted of 100 questions. Middle school (up to grade 8), junior high (up to grade 9), and high school (up to grade 12) contests were held in December and April and consisted of 200 questions.

The Academic Hallmarks and Knowledge Masters mascot is a great auk with an affinity for puns.

== Rules and scoring ==
Each participating school received a password-protected disk (originally a floppy disk, later a CD-ROM) containing the contest questions. Only the first use of the password would generate a valid score report for submission to Academic Hallmarks. Team size was left to each individual school's discretion.

All questions were multiple-choice, with a maximum value of 10 points each. Each question and its category were displayed on screen, with five choices and a 60-second timer. A correct answer on the first try awarded five points, with up to five bonus points depending on the response time. If time expired or an incorrect response was given, the timer was reset to 60 seconds and the team was given a second chance to answer. Two points were awarded for a correct second-chance response, with no bonus.

Bonus points were awarded for correct first-try answers as follows:

More than	No more than	Bonus points
0 seconds	7 seconds	5
7 seconds	12 seconds	4
12 seconds	17 seconds	3
17 seconds	22 seconds	2
22 seconds	29 seconds	1
29 seconds	60 seconds	0

The maximum potential score was 1,000 points (5th/6th grade) or 2,000 points (middle school and up), attainable by answering every question correctly on the first try and in less than 7 seconds each.

Teams could take up to three 5-minute breaks during the contest. They could use pencil and paper, but no other resources such as calculators or reference books, and assistance from coaches or spectators was not allowed.

Once a particular contest was over, the participating schools could use a second password to unlock the questions for unlimited use in practice sessions.

== See also ==
- Knowledge Bowl
