= Northwest Christian High School (Lacey, Washington) =

Location
- 4710 Park Center Ave. NE; Lacey, Washington; USA; 47°03′06″N 122°49′15″W

Information
- Type: Private secondary
- Motto: Developing Christian Leaders
- Established: 1995
- Principal: Joshua Snyder
- Faculty: Approx. 20
- Grades: 9-12
- Enrollment: Approx. 130
- Colors: Navy, Teal, White, and Gray
- Mascot: Wolverines
- Website: ncslacey.org

Northwest Christian High School (NCHS) is a private school in Thurston County, Washington. It is part of Northwest Christian Schools of Lacey, Washington, which also includes Northwest Christian Preschool and the K–8 Northwest Christian Academy. In the 2006–2007 school year, it provided education for 206 students in grades 9 through 12. Its motto is "Developing Christian Leaders".

In 2019, the school's nickname changed from the Navigators to the Wolverines. Northwest Christian High School provides college preparatory academics, a variety of elective classes, competitive sports, and TOEFL preparation.

== History ==
Founded in 1995, the school was originally located on the first and second floors of the Capitol Christian Center in downtown Olympia, Washington. By 1999, Northwest Christian had moved to a new campus in Lacey and had 100 students.

== Academics ==
The school has fielded a Knowledge Bowl team since 2001. In 2012, the team won the 2B state championship, followed by third-place finishes in 2013 and 2014.

== Athletics ==
The school has a cross country running program that has won several state championships, including five consecutive titles in the 2B/1B boy's category. The Wolverines fielded a six-man football team in 2021 as part of a pilot program organized by the Washington Interscholastic Activities Association. They then went on to go undefeated in both the 2023 and 2024 6-man football seasons.

== Wesley Wolverine ==
After Community Christian Academy and Northwest Christian High School merged in 2000 Wesley Wolverine (Or "Westley" Wolverine) replaced the "Gator" as the school mascot. This was because, when they merged, they replaced the Navigators moniker with the name "Northwest Wolverines". The titular Wolverine's name was decided in a vote across the school, and "Westley" was the winner of this poll. However, Wesley has been used on the official social media website for the school and he has colloquially been referred to as Wesley, so the "Westley" pun seems to have been left in the past. Wesley's appearance varies across different school materials, but there are two main incarnations of him. One of them, pictured on the sports section of the official website and sports jerseys for the high school depicts him as a vicious, pointed animal.
