= Nate Mondou =

American baseball player (born 1995)

- Infielder
- Born: March 24, 1995 (age 31); Tacoma, Washington
- Batted: Left Threw: Right

MLB debut
- October 4, 2022, for the Oakland Athletics

Last MLB appearance
- October 4, 2022, for the Oakland Athletics

MLB statistics
- Batting average: .000
- Home runs: 0
- Runs batted in: 0
- Stats at Baseball Reference

Teams
- Oakland Athletics (2022)

Nathan Wayne Mondou (born March 24, 1995) is an American former professional baseball infielder. He played in Major League Baseball (MLB) for the Oakland Athletics, appearing in a single game in 2022 as a second baseman.

== Amateur career ==
Mondou attended Charles Wright Academy in University Place, Washington, and Wake Forest University, where he played college baseball for the Wake Forest Demon Deacons. In 2015, he played collegiate summer baseball with the Chatham Anglers of the Cape Cod Baseball League.

== Professional career ==
=== Oakland Athletics ===
The Oakland Athletics selected Mondou in the 13th round, with the 382nd overall selection, of the 2016 MLB draft. He spent his first professional season with the Low-A Vermont Lake Monsters, also playing in one game for the rookie-level Arizona League Athletics. In 60 games with Vermont, Mondou hit .298/.376/.364 with no home runs, 24 RBI, and six stolen bases.

In 2017, Mondou split the season between the Single-A Beloit Snappers and High-A Stockton Ports, batting a cumulative .287/.367/.381 with 2 home runs, 59 RBI, and 16 stolen bases across 125 games. He played in 136 games split between Stockton and the Double-A Midland RockHounds in 2018, slashing .279/.356/.399 with career-highs in home runs (8) and RBI (75) paired with 10 stolen bases. In 2019, Mondou spent the year with Midland, playing in 122 games and hitting .248/.344/.333 with 5 home runs, 45 RBI, and 7 stolen bases.

He did not play in a game in 2020 due to the cancellation of the minor league season because of the COVID-19 pandemic. Mondou spent the 2021 season with the Triple-A Las Vegas Aviators, playing in 87 games and hitting .283/.371/.432 with 8 home runs and 49 RBI. He returned to Las Vegas in 2022, making 108 appearances and slashing .283/.374/.431 with 7 home runs and 64 RBI.

On October 3, 2022, Mondou was selected to the 40-man roster and promoted to the major leagues for the first time. He made his MLB debut the next day in a game against the Los Angeles Angels, going 0-for-2 with a walk. On November 3, Mondou was removed from the 40-man roster and sent outright to Triple-A. He elected free agency following the season on November 10.

=== Chicago White Sox ===
On January 31, 2023, Mondou signed a minor league contract with the Chicago White Sox organization. He was assigned to the Double-A Birmingham Barons to begin the year, where he went 1-for-5 with a home run in two games. Mondou was promoted to the Triple-A Charlotte Knights after Lenyn Sosa was recalled to the White Sox. He played in 116 games for Charlotte, batting .270/.379/.434 with a career–high 13 home runs, 61 RBI, and 7 stolen bases. Mondou elected free agency following the season on November 6.

=== San Diego Padres ===
On December 8, 2023, Mondou signed a minor league contract with the San Diego Padres. In 101 appearances for the Triple-A El Paso Chihuahuas, he slashed .267/.367/.404 with five home runs, 55 RBI, and 11 stolen bases. Mondou elected free agency following the season on November 4, 2024.

On February 17, 2025, Mondou re-signed with the Padres organization on a new minor league contract. He made 130 appearances for El Paso, slashing .308/.400/.422 with six home runs, 74 RBI, and eight stolen bases. Mondou elected free agency following the season on November 6.

On February 17, 2026, Mondou once again re-signed with the Padres organization on a minor league contract. He made 42 appearances for Triple–A El Paso, batting .254/.333/.442 with five home runs, 29 RBI, and one stolen base. Mondou was released by the Padres on August 6.

On August 24, 2026, Mondou announced his retirement from professional baseball via his Instagram account.
