= Ridgefield High School (Washington) =

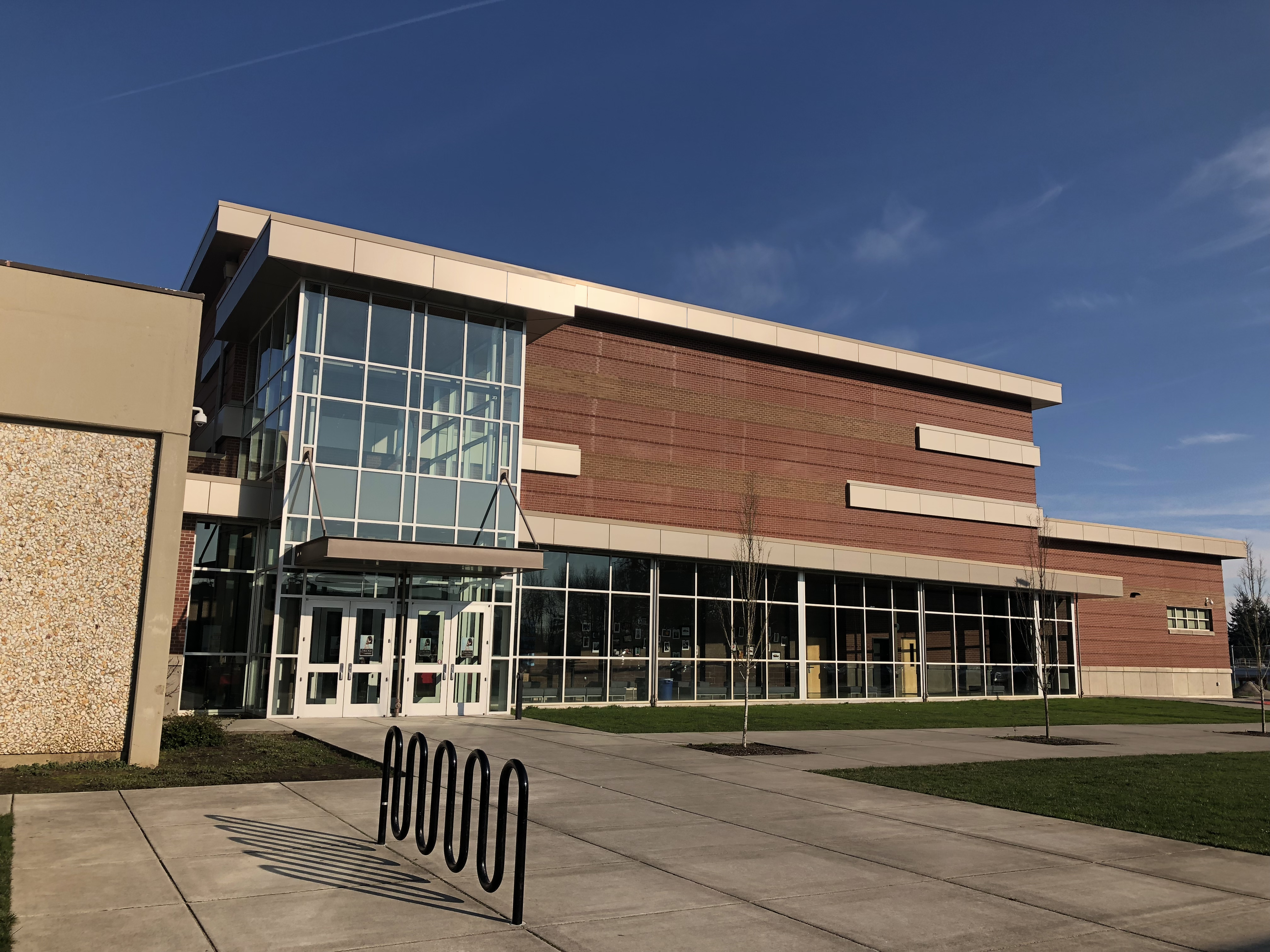

Location
- 2630 S Hillhurst Rd; Ridgefield, Washington 98642; United States; 45°47′50″N 122°42′52″W

Information
- Type: Public high school
- Established: 1911; 115 years ago
- School district: Ridgefield School District
- CEEB code: 481005
- NCES School ID: 530735001105
- Staff: 60.15 (on an FTE basis)
- Grades: 9–12
- Enrollment: 1,249 (2024–2025)
- Student to teacher ratio: 20.76
- Colors: Blue, Orange
- Athletics conference: WIAA Greater St. Helens 2A
- Mascot: Spudders
- Rival: Columbia River High School
- Website: www.ridgefieldsd.org/o/high-school

Ridgefield High School (RHS) is a public high school in Ridgefield, Washington in Clark County. RHS is the only public high school in the Ridgefield School District, which includes Ridgefield, most of Duluth, and a part of Mount Vista. As of 2025, the school reported 1249 students. RHS is a member of the Washington Interscholastic Activities Association Southwest District.

== History ==
Ridgefield High School was established on November 12, 1911, succeeding or incorporating Horn's Corner School. The first graduating class completed its studies in May 1912. 50 students were enrolled by September, making it the second largest school in Clark County at the time. An eight-room school building costing $15,000 (in 1922 dollars) opened in January 1922.

On May 10, 1927, the school burned down. It was replaced by a brick-and-tile school in February 1928 for $85,000. That school stood until Union Ridge (a current elementary school) was used to house the high schoolers in double shifts with the elementary students for new construction during 1969–1970. By June 1971, the old high school was demolished and used for space to park buses. Phase 1 consisted of one building and a gym.

== Sports ==
=== Football ===
In the 1995 season, the Ridgefield Spudders won the WIAA State 1A Championship against Cascade (Leavenworth) 44–30 in the Tacoma Dome in Tacoma, Washington. Fullback Nate Edgar rushed for four touchdowns in the game and is still an Individual championship game 1A record. In the game Ridgefield tied the championship game 1A record for most first downs in a game, 23. The combined score of 74 total points was a championship game 1A record until 2010. Ridgefield was the first school from Clark County, Washington to win the State football Championship.

=== Volleyball ===
The Ridgefield Spudders from 1975 to 1993 had 18 consecutive WIAA 1A State Playoffs appearances, placing 14 times (four state championships in 1975, 1976, 1983 and 1990; runner-up in 1977, 1980 and 1981; 3rd place in 1983 and 1987; 4th place in 1979, 1982, 1989, 1992, 1993). In 2015, Spudder Volleyball placed 3rd in the 2A State Playoffs. According to the WIAA, in their most recently published annual State Championship Volleyball publication (2015, see "All Time Information"), the RHS Volleyball program has made more WIAA State appearances than any other school regardless of its size, tallying a total of 34 appearances at State since 1975.

=== Cross Country ===
In 1995, the boys cross country team had its best team finish in the WIAA 1A State Championship finishing in 6th place with a team score of 164. Ridgefield Spudder Jim Reed won the race with the time of 15:11.5 (3.0 miles).

=== Girls Cross Country ===
In 1994, the girls cross country team had its best team finish in the WIAA Girls 1A State Championship finishing 3rd with a team score of 115.

=== Basketball ===
In 1981, Ridgefield placed 3rd in the WIAA 1A State Basketball Tournament defeating Goldendale 84–63 at Univ. of Puget Sound.

=== Girls Basketball ===
In 1978, Ridgefield placed 4th in the WIAA 1A State Girls Basketball Tournament defeating Liberty Bell 52–51 at Central WA Univ.

=== Wrestling ===
The Spudders wrestling team had their best finish as State Runners-up in 1968–69, 1969–70.

=== Baseball ===
In the 2002 season, the Ridgefield Spudders won the WIAA State 2A Championship against Ephrata 15–10 in Yakima, WA.

=== Softball ===
In the 2004 season, the Ridgefield Spudders won the WIAA State 2A Fastpitch Softball Championship against East Valley (Yakima) in Wenatchee, WA, 6–3.

=== Boys Soccer ===
In 2004 and 2005, the Spudders lost in the 2A state finals to Wahluke, both games 1–0. In 2012 and 2013, the Ridgefield Spudders took 4th in the state soccer tournament.

=== Girls Soccer ===
Ridgefield's 2A girls soccer program has made it to the 2nd round of the WIAA State Playoffs at least 8 times with 11 appearances. In 2015, the Lady Spudders took home 2nd place, losing 4–0 against Squalicum. In 2023, the Spudders (20–3) advanced to the State Championship vs. West Valley (21–1) and came back from deficits twice to send the game to overtime and Penalty Kicks, where they won their first state title on November 18, 2023, at Mount Tahoma Stadium in Tacoma, WA. Ridgefield goalkeeper Gabriela Semlick made two saves in the PK shootout, including the fourth attempt when the senior tipped a shot up that bounced off the crossbar and out.

=== Tennis ===
In 2006 the girls' tennis team had its best finish as State Runner-up in the WIAA 2A Championship against Ephrata, 25–16. In 2003 the boys tennis team had their best finish as State Runner-Up in the WIAA 2A Championship.

=== Golf ===
In 2019, the Boys Golf Team won the WIAA 2A State Championship beating runner-up Sequim 128 to 83.5. In 2004 and 2011 the Boys Golf team finished as State Runner-up in the WIAA Championship.

=== Track And Field ===
In 1997, the boys track and field team won the WIAA 1A State championship against runner-up Quincy 50–40.

=== Knowledge Bowl ===
In 2021, 2022, 2023, and 2025 the Knowledge Bowl team won the WIAA 2A State championship. In 2025 the Knowledge Bowl team won the national invitational tournament.

== Notable alumni ==
- Matt Randel - professional baseball pitcher
- Phil Spencer - business executive at Microsoft, and current head of the Xbox brand
