= Desales Catholic High School (Walla Walla, Washington) =

DeSales Catholic High School
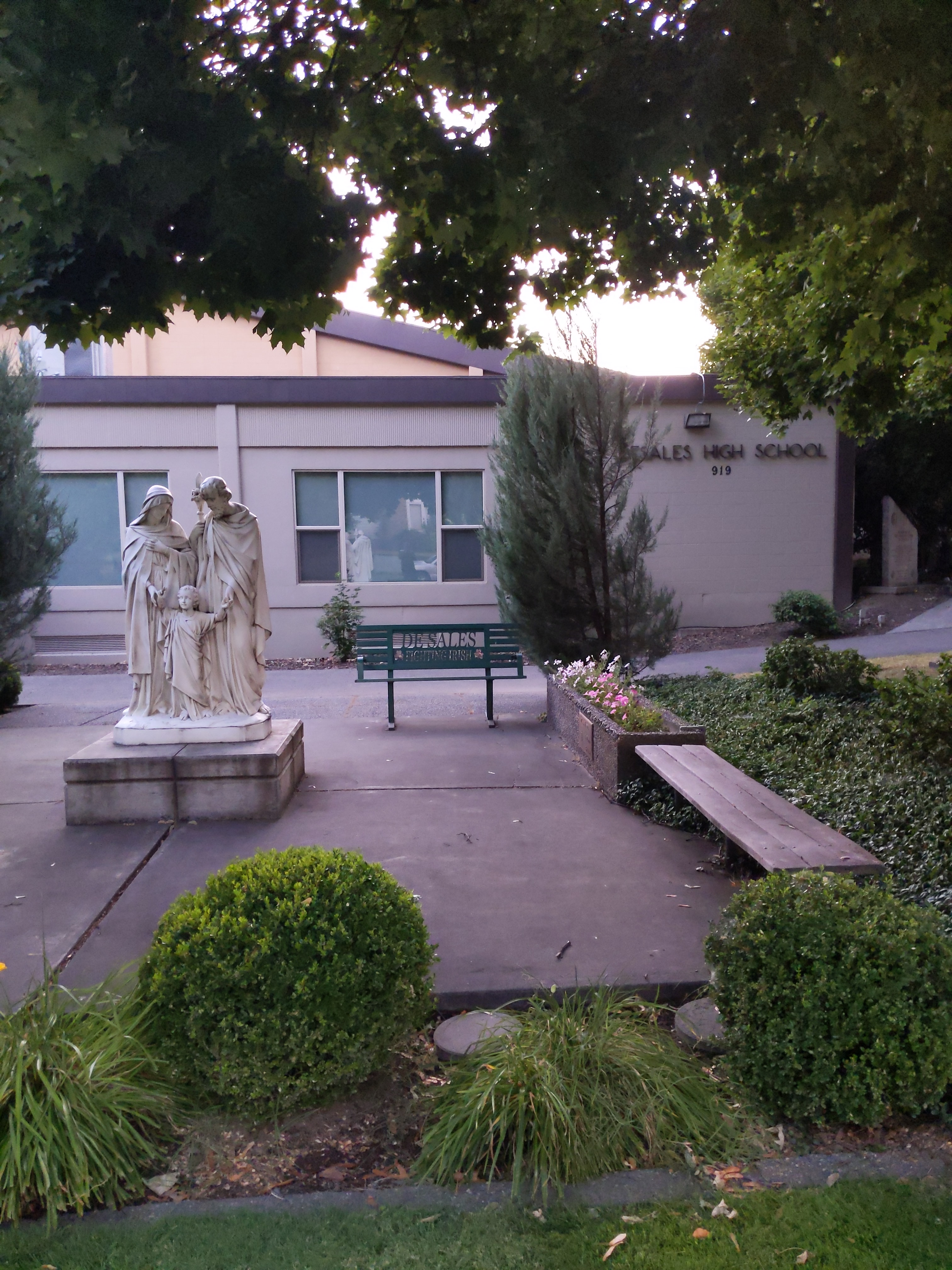
- Main entrance to high school

Location
- 919 East Sumach Street; Walla Walla, Washington 99362; United States; 46°4′36″N 118°19′58″W

Information
- Type: Private, Coeducational
- Religious affiliation: Roman Catholic
- Patron saint: Saint Francis DeSales
- Established: 1864
- Principal: John Lesko
- Head of school: Rev. Curtis Seidel
- Grades: 7–12
- Colors: Green and Gold
- Fight song: DeSales Fight Song
- Athletics: football, volleyball, cheer, girls basketball, boys basketball, golf, track, baseball, softball
- Mascot: leprechaun
- Team name: Fighting Irish
- Rival: Liberty Christian
- Accreditation: Northwest Accreditation Commission
- Yearbook: The DeSalian
- Feeder schools: Assumption Grade School
- Athletic Director: Nick Hazeltime
- Website: www.wallawallacatholicschools.com

DeSales Catholic High School is a private, Roman Catholic high school in Walla Walla, Washington. It is located in the Roman Catholic Diocese of Spokane.

== Background ==
DeSales Catholic traces its roots to two high schools, all-girls St. Vincent Academy and St. Patrick's School for Boys. St. Vincent Academy was established by the Sisters of Providence of Vancouver in 1864. St. Patrick's School for Boys was established in 1865 by the Christian Brothers. St. Patrick's was renamed LaSalle Institute in 1899. The two schools merged in 1930. The school moved to its current campus in 1959 and was renamed (Saint Francis) DeSales High School.
