= Medical Lake High School =

Location
- 200 E. Barker St. Medical Lake, Washington 99022; U.S. 47.576°N 117.681°W

Information
- Type: Public, four-year
- Motto: Soaring into the future to create a better tomorrow
- Established: 1905, 1958 (current)
- School district: Medical Lake S.D. #326
- NCES School ID: 530495000755
- Principal: Jeremy Vincent
- Faculty: 32
- Grades: 9–12
- Enrollment: 511 (2023-2024)
- Student to teacher ratio: 16.98
- Campus: Open campus
- Colors: Cardinal & White
- Athletics: WIAA Class 1A (District 7)
- Athletics conference: Northeast 1A (NEA)
- Mascot: Cardinal
- Newspaper: Cardinal Playbook
- Yearbook: The Cardinal
- Information: (509) 565-3200
- Elevation: 2,420 ft (740 m) AMSL
- Website: mlhs.mlsd.org

Medical Lake High School is a four-year public secondary school in Medical Lake, Washington, the sole traditional high school in the Medical Lake School District (#326) in western Spokane County. West of the city of Spokane, the school district includes the base housing area of Fairchild Air Force Base to the north.

== History and enrollment ==
Medical Lake High School was founded in 1905, in Medical Lake, Washington. In 1958, the high school was refounded and moved into a new building, but then was added on to in 1970 to encompass the growing number of students being enrolled.

In 2017, a Medical Lake High school student was investigated for a Google Drive filled with sexually explicit pictures of other students with the youngest victim being 14. In February 2018, a threat was made against the school by a student and was investigated by the Spokane County Sheriff's Office. A few months later in April 2018, a Medical Lake student was killed while three other students were injured in a car crash when headed to a track meet. This started the #MedicalLakeStrong movement in Spokane, with schools such as Freeman High School and Shadle Park High School offering their support and solidarity.

That June, the district announced that they had received a one million dollar STEM grant and that the high school students would be receiving their own personal Chromebooks that September. In November 2021, a bombing threat against Medical Lake High School was exposed.

Enrollment has declined within the Medical Lake School District and is expected to continue. A contributing factor has been the privatization of base housing at Fairchild Air Force Base; an increasing number of military families have chosen to live off-base and outside the M.L. school district. A building moratorium by the city of Medical Lake and a sluggish economy have also contributed.

MLHS grew in the 1970s from 487 in 1970 to 650 in 1978, but declined in the early 1980s to below 500 in 1983 and athletics dropped from the 'AA' Frontier League and returned to the 'A' NEA in 1984. Enrollment was 675 in October 2007, but fell to 512 in four grades in May 2012. As of 2021, the current enrollment number is 517.

== School administration ==
- Principal: Jeremy Vincent
- Vice Principal: Justin Blayne
- Vice Principal: Lyra McGirk
- Athletic Director: Dawn Eliassen

== Notable alumni ==
- Paul Butorac (2003), basketball player who played overseas
- Cedric Jackson (2004 - transferred), former NBA player

== Sports and activities ==
=== Sports ===
Medical Lake athletic teams compete in WIAA Class 1A in District 7. MLHS was a member of the Great Northern League (GNL) in class 2A since its inception in 1998, but dropped out of the GNL for football in 2010. The school dropped to class 1A in the summer of 2012; and returned to the Northeast 'A' League (NEA).

==== Fall sports ====
- Cross Country
- Girls Soccer
- Girls Volleyball
- Football

==== Winter sports ====
- Boys Basketball
- Girls Basketball
- Wrestling

==== Spring sports ====
- Baseball
- Boys Golf
- Girls Golf
- Boys Soccer
- Boys Tennis
- Girls Tennis
- Girls Softball
- Track and field

==== State championships ====
- 1992 "A" Wrestling Team
- 2004 "2A" Boys Tennis Team
- 2005 "2A" Boys Basketball
- 2005 "2A" Boys Tennis Team
- 2005 "2A" Knowledge Bowl
- 2013 "1A" Boys Cross Country
- 2014 "1A" Boys Track & Field
- 2014 "1A" Boys Cross Country
- 2017 "1A" Boys Cross Country

=== Activities ===
- ASB
- Band
- Cheer
- Choir
- Knowledge Bowl
- FIRST Robotics Competition
- FFA
- Cardinal Players
- FBLA
- FCCLA
- Key Club
- National Honors Society
- Air Force JROTC
