= Skyward =

American management software company

- Type: Corporation
- Industry: Enterprise software, educational support software
- Founded: 1980
- Headquarters: Stevens Point, Wisconsin, US
- Area served: Wisconsin, Washington, Utah, Texas, Tennessee, South Dakota, Rhode Island, Pennsylvania, New Mexico, New Jersey, Missouri, Minnesota, Michigan, Kansas, Indiana, Illinois, Idaho, Florida, Colorado
- Key people: James King, Founder Scott Glinski, CEO Ray Ackerlund, President
- Website: www.skyward.com

Skyward is a software company specializing in K–12 school management and municipality management technologies, including student management, human resources, and financial management. Skyward is partnered with more than 1,900 school districts and municipalities worldwide.

== Applications ==
Skyward applications are currently used by school districts and municipalities in 22 U.S. states and multiple international locations. Skyward's student information system (SIS) and enterprise resource planning (ERP) solutions are designed to automate and simplify daily tasks in the areas of student management, financial management, and human resources.

Students' guardians use Skyward's Family Access product to stay up-to-date on students' grades, school schedules, food service accounts, and to communicate with teachers and other district staff. Students use Skyward's Student Access product to check their own grades and schedules, work on online assignments, and communicate with teachers.

== History ==
=== 1980–2000 ===
Skyward was founded by Jim King in 1980 in Stevens Point, Wisconsin under the name Jim King and Associates. King worked as a subcontracted employee for a variety of businesses around Wisconsin, writing human resources and accounting software for Burroughs B80 and IBM 5150 computers. In 1981, King wrote software for Merrill Area Public Schools, which was subsequently purchased by three other districts in Wisconsin.

In 1984, Jim King & Associates incorporated as a company and adopted the name School Administrative Software, Incorporated (SASI).

In 1988 and 1992, SASI opened offices in St. Cloud, Minnesota and Bloomington, Illinois, respectively. In 1994, SASI purchased Matrix Computers, a special education administration software company, and SASI changed their name to Skyward, Inc..

In 1998 and 1999, Skyward opened offices in Michigan and Indiana.

=== 2001–2010 ===
In this timeline, Skyward expanded sales to Utah, Pennsylvania, New Jersey, New Mexico, Tennessee and Florida and annual or semi-annual Skyward user conferences were being held in most of the states that had Skyward customers, which has continued as new customers in new states are added.

In 2001, Skyward partnered with the Washington School Information Processing Cooperative (WSIPC) to integrate into 297 districts throughout the state of Washington.

In 2002, Skyward opened an office in Austin, Texas.

In March 2003, Skyward held their first national conference, which later became the Skyward International Conference when, in 2006, Skyward partnered with their first international customer, the American Embassy School in New Delhi, India. The Skyward International Conference, iCon, is held each spring in Florida.

=== 2011–2014 ===
In 2011 the Texas Education Agency selected Skyward as a preferred vendor of student administrative software for Texas schools.

In 2013, Rhode Island and Tennessee education departments both selected Skyward as a preferred vendor of student administrative software for their schools.

=== 2015–present ===
In March 2016, Skyward moved all corporate operations to its new world headquarters building in Stevens Point, WI.

== Awards ==
- 2013, 2015 EdTech Digest Cool Tool Award
- 2017, 2018 Bubbler Award
- 2024 Wisconsin Innovation Award
