= Saint George's School (Spokane, Washington) =

Private prep school in Washington, US

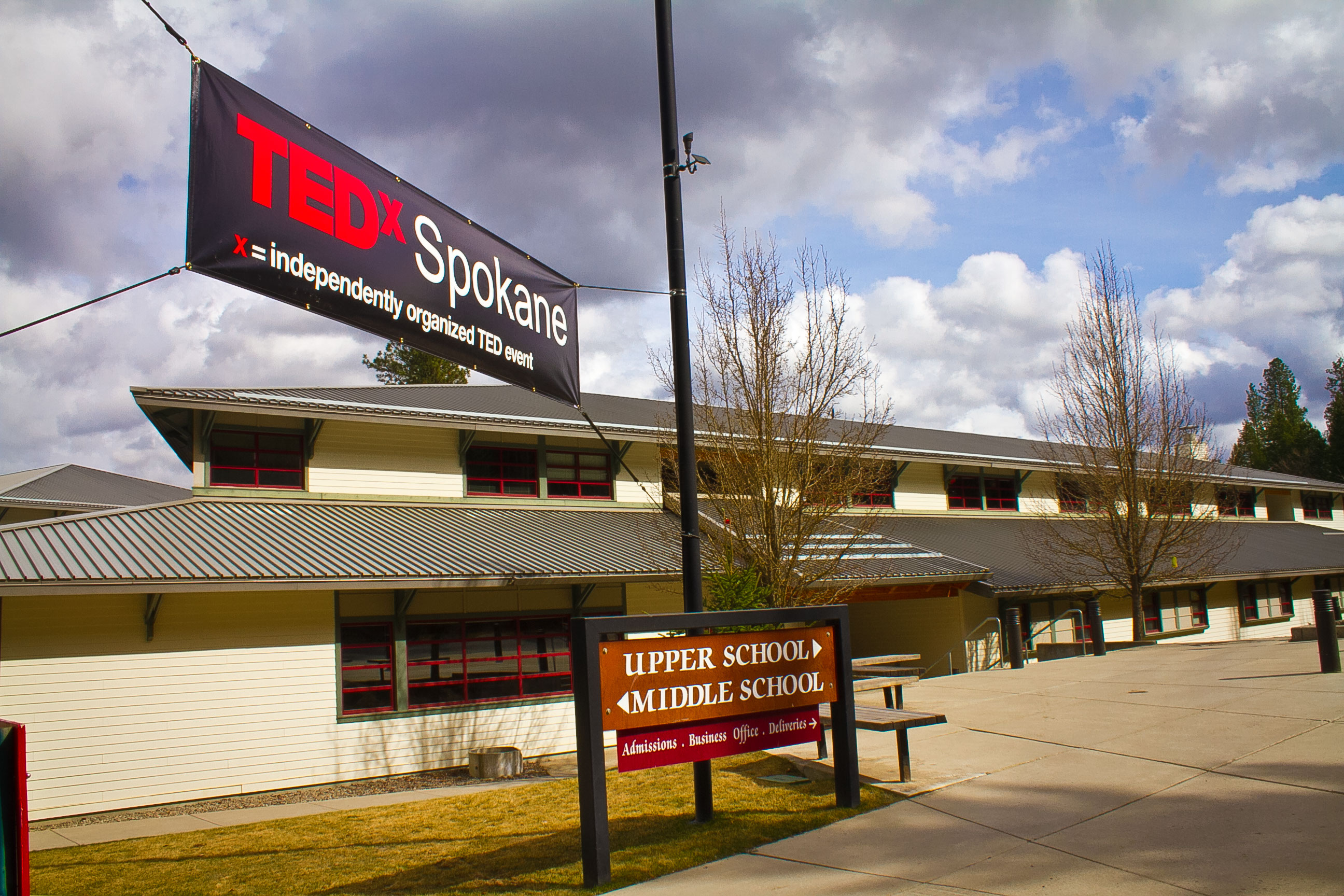
- The Upper School

Location
- 2929 West Waikiki Road; Spokane, Washington 99208; United States; 47°46′04″N 117°28′17″W

Information
- School type: Private school
- Established: 1955; 71 years ago
- NCES School ID: A9301026
- Headmaster: Jamie Tender
- Grades: K–12
- Enrollment: 350 (as of 2020–21)
- Student to teacher ratio: 9
- Campus type: Rural
- Colors: Red, white, and black
- Mascot: Dragon
- Annual tuition: $22,960 (high school)
- Information: (509) 466–1636
- Website: sgs.org

Saint George's School is an independent K–12 college preparatory school located in Spokane, Washington. The campus is located on 120 acres (0.49 km^{2}) along the Little Spokane River.

== History ==
Saint George's School was established in 1955 as St. George's Episcopal School at Flowerfield, the former summer estate of businessman Louis Davenport. At that time, there were 45 students in grades seven through nine. Students were first allocated space in the stable, along with livestock in the other portion, while construction of the original school building was underway.

By 1957, association with the Episcopal Church was severed, and the school name was officially changed to Saint George's School. In June 1959, Saint George's held its first commencement exercises: nine seniors crossed graduation bridge to the music of the Angus Scott pipe band, a tradition that is continued to this day.

== Present ==
Today, the Saint George's School campus consists of the Davenport House (the estate's original home), the Upper School, the Middle School, the Lower School, the Errol Schmidt Athletic Center (ESAC), Metters Gym, The Little Gym, the Arts Building, the Caretaker's Cottage, and the maintenance building. Additionally, there are libraries in both the Lower School and the Upper School.

As a college preparatory school, most SGS graduating seniors are accepted into and attend a four-year college or university. Its college counselors work with students and parents beginning in tenth grade to ensure the "best fit" in the colleges selected by seniors.

In 2010 and 2011, 75% of Saint George's students in grades 10-12 took at least one Advanced Placement (AP) course. Those students scored a 3, 4, or 5 on 82% of their exams, potentially earning college credit.

Saint George's contests an athletic rivalry with Northwest Christian Schools. Each year, students from both schools compete in a spirit competition for the "Holy Grail" during the annual boys and girls varsity basketball games. At the event, both schools work together to raise money for a non-profit organization, which sends representatives to determine the winner of the prize.

As of 2021, there were 95 students in grades K-5, 105 students in grades 6-8, and 130 students in grades 9-12.

== Notable events ==
In 2001, student Eric Malm became a presidential scholar.

In 2004, Saint George's was awarded a $3.5 million challenge grant from the Bill & Melinda Gates Foundation as part of their goal to raise $10 million for their 50th Anniversary in 2005.

In 2007, Bill and Melinda Gates were the featured speakers at Saint George's graduation. Gates said: "Remember, the final measure of your life won't be how well you live, but how well others live, because of you".

In 2014, the school transitioned to the International Baccalaureate Diploma Program, becoming the first school in the Spokane area to do so.

In 2016, Jamie Tender was appointed Head of School. He had previously been the Head of Middle School and Assistant Head for Advancement. He succeeded Joseph Kennedy (2011-2016).

In 2018 and 2020, the school won the WIAA Scholastic Cup, recognizing its excellence in academics, arts, and athletics as the top 2B classification school in Washington state.

In 2020, the new Arts Building opened, providing expanded space for both the Lower and Middle School art and music classes.

== Activities ==
Saint George's has several clubs, including knowledge bowl, debate, chess, and robotics. Dances, plays, and concerts are attended by a portion of the student body. In 2015, Saint George's school newspaper, the Round Table, was founded.

Some traditions are celebrated at Saint George's, including a "Dragon Dance" on the lawn at the beginning of the year, and the seniors walking across the graduation bridge to receive their diplomas. Saint George's also has an outdoor club that makes use of the surrounding forest and Little Spokane River.

== Athletics ==
Saint George's no-cut, championship athletic program allows all students to participate in competitive athletic pursuits. Teams compete in the Panorama League of Washington's WIAA Class 2B.

Saint George's high school teams have won a total of 29 state championships, including:

- Girls basketball: 4 (1994, 2000, 2002, 2004)
- Boys basketball: 1 (2013)
- Girls cross country: 5 (1993, 1994, 1998, 1999, 2000)
- Boys cross country: 3 (1993, 2006, 2007)
- Boys Track and Field: 2 (2023, 2024)
- Girls track and field: 6 (1995, 2016, 2022, 2023, 2024, 2025)
- Boys tennis: 4 (2002, 2004, 2014, 2025)
- Girls soccer: 2 (2016, 2018)
- Boys soccer: 4 (2000, 2015, 2016, 2019)
- Girls golf: 1 (2014)
- Boys golf: 1 (2014)

In 2008, 2018, and 2020, Saint George's won the Wells Fargo WIAA Scholastic Cup, a statewide honor for schools that recognizes outstanding performance in both academics and athletics. The school teams' performances at state competitions throughout 2007-08, 2017–18, and 2019–20 and their high grade point averages earned Saint George's the Scholastic Cup for 2B schools.

== Demographics ==
30% of Saint George's attendees are people of color. 35% of the students receive financial aid. As of 2021, there are approximately 15 international students (12%) in grades 9-12.

== Notable alumni ==
- David Shannon (1978), author and illustrator of many notable children's books including No, David!
- Sydney Sweeney (born 1997), actress, attended Saint George's during much of middle school, before moving to Los Angeles.
