= Connell High School =

Public school in Connell, Washington, US

Coordinates: 46°39′44″N 118°52′19″W

- 1100 W Clark Road; Connell, WA 99326

Information
- Type: Public
- School district: North Franklin School District
- Principal: Stephen Wallace
- Enrollment: 609 (2023–2024)
- Colors: Purple; Gold
- Information: (509) 234-2921
- Website: https://www.nfsd.org

Connell High School is a public high school located in Connell, Washington, serving over 610 students in grades 9–12.

The current principal is Stephen Wallace. The school's athletics nickname is the Eagles. Connell High School is part of the North Franklin School District in Franklin County, Washington. The school draws students from Connell, Washington and the surrounding towns of Mesa, Washington, Eltopia, Washington, and Basin City, Washington. The school's student body is roughly 74 percent Hispanic, 24 percent White, and 1 percent Asian.

== Athletics ==
Connell High School has a variety of sports programs and extracurricular activities in which students are allowed to participate. Sports include Football, Cross-Country, Volleyball, Soccer, Basketball, Wrestling, Track and field, Softball, Baseball, and Cheerleading. Since 2006 Connell has been a member of the SCAC East athletic conference after the Washington Interscholastic Activities Association reclassified its divisions. At that time Connell dropped from AA to A.

== Football ==
The football program is one of Connell's most successful athletic programs winning state championships in 2002[1], 2009, and 2011, and finishing as runner up in 1973, 2006[4], 2007[5], and 2010. The team has also finished in third place four times: in 1998, 2004, 2005, and 2015. Since 2000, the Eagles have consistently been among the best high school programs in the state making the State playoffs 13 times. Wayne Riner has been the most successful football coach in Connell history after becoming head coach in 2000.

== Notable alumni ==
- Clint Didier, American football player and politician
- Spencer Hadley (2008), American football linebacker
