= Freeman High School (Washington) =

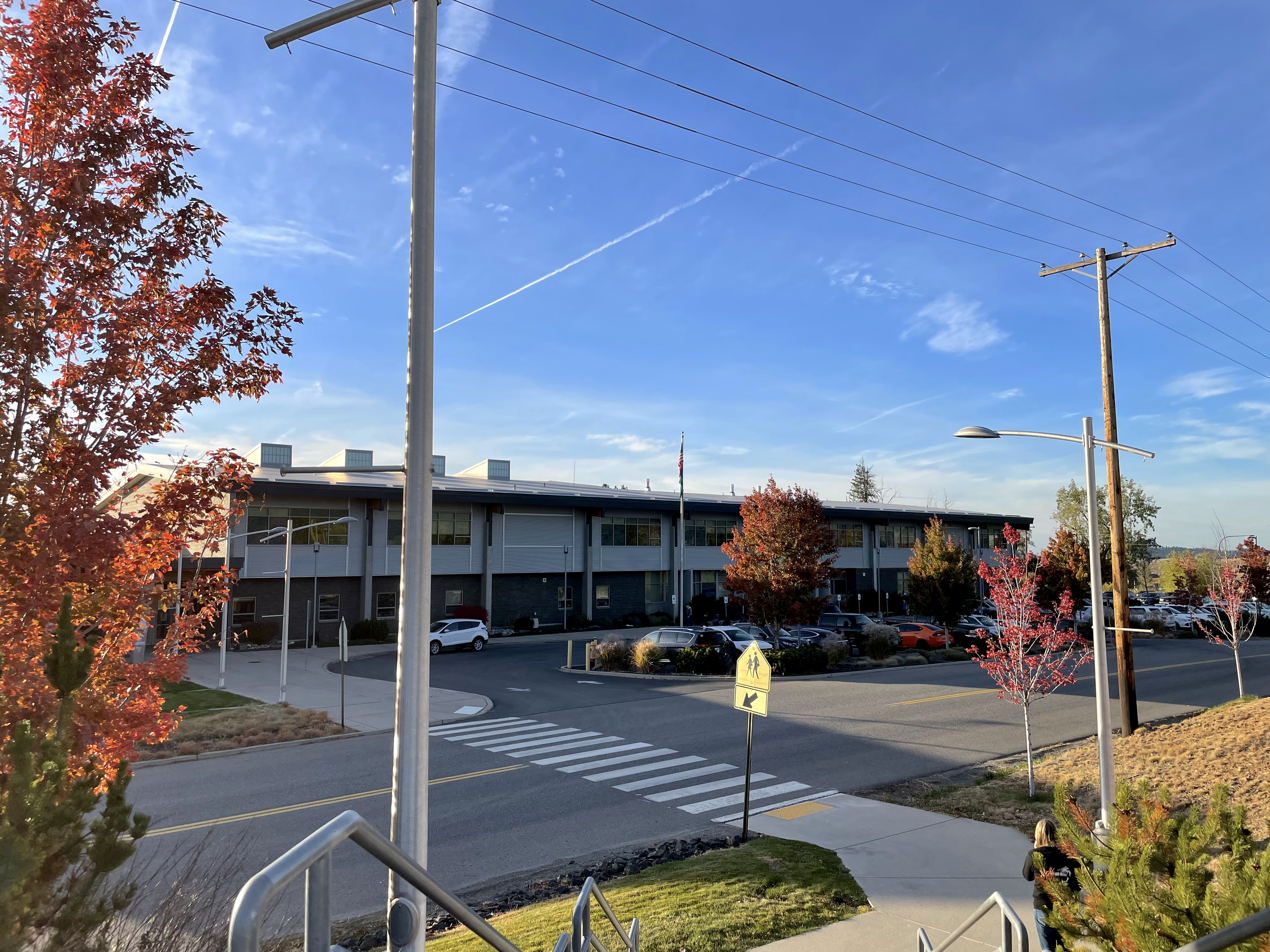
- Freeman High School in October, 2021

Location
- 14626 South Jackson Rd; Rockford, Washington 99030; United States; 47°31′12″N 117°11′47″W

Information
- Type: Public
- Established: 1955
- School district: Freeman School District
- NCES School ID: 530297000485
- Principal: Jeff Smith
- Teaching staff: 17.84 (on a FTE basis)
- Grades: 9–12
- Enrollment: 300 (2023-2024)
- Student to teacher ratio: 16.82
- Colors: Columbia Blue, Red & White
- Athletics conference: Northeast 2B, Northeast District 7, Washington Interscholastic Activities Association
- Nickname: Scotties
- Rival: Liberty High School
- Website: fhs.freemansd.org

Freeman High School is a public high school located north of Rockford, Washington and 19 mi (31 km) southwest of Spokane, Washington. It is a part of the adjacent three-school Freeman School District facility that contains Freeman Elementary School, Freeman Middle School, and Freeman High School.

== Athletics ==
Freeman high school competes in Washington's Northeast A League. The school fields teams in the following sports:

- Fall: Cross Country, Football, Soccer, Volleyball
- Winter: Wrestling, Basketball
- Spring: Baseball, Golf, Softball, Tennis and Track & Field

Freeman's athletic teams are known as the Scotties. The elementary and middle schools were known as the Freeman Raiders until 2014. The original old Scottie dog logo was created by Freeman student Margee Noble.

== History ==
The Freeman School District was formed in 1955 as a consolidation of the Rockford, Lindbergh, and Sunnyside School Districts. There had been another Freeman school district prior to 1940, when it was annexed by Lindbergh.

=== 2017 shooting ===
On September 13, 2017, a gunman opened fire at Freeman. The assailant, then 15-year-old sophomore Caleb Sharpe, brought two guns, an AR-15 rifle and a Colt 1903 pistol then shot and killed one student, 15-year-old fellow sophomore Samuel Strahan, who was attempting to prevent the shooting from taking place, in the torso and head. Three other students were injured and taken to the hospital. Sharpe pleaded guilty before his trial as an adult. In 2022, Sharpe was sentenced to 40 years to life in prison. In September 2024 he was re-sentenced to 25 years to life due to a law banning people from being sentenced to over 25 years to life for crimes committed before they were 16 years old.

== Demographics ==
The demographic breakdown of the 317 students enrolled in 2019–2020 was:

- Male – 53.8%
- Female – 46.2%
- Native American/Alaskan – 3.1%
- Asian/Pacific islanders – 2.4%
- Black – 1.2%
- Hispanic – 5.8%
- White – 85.6%
- Multiracial – 1.9%

22.3 percent of the students were eligible for free or reduced lunch.
