= Charles Wright Academy =

Private school in University Place, Washington, US

Location
- 7723 Chambers Creek Road West; Tacoma, Washington 98467; United States; 47°12′04″N 122°32′43″W

Information
- Type: Private day school college-prep
- Established: 1957
- Head of School: Rachel Rippl
- Grades: PS–12
- Gender: Co-educational
- Enrollment: 590
- Average class size: ≈15
- Colors: Green and White
- Mascot: Tarriers
- Website: www.charleswright.org

Charles Wright Academy is a coed private college preparatory school in University Place, Washington, offering Preschool to Grade 12.

CWA is a member of the National Association of Independent Schools (NAIS) and the Northwest Association of Independent Schools (NWAIS).

It is located on a 107-acre campus in Tacoma, Washington, and has a non-sectarian religious affiliation.

== History ==
In 1947, Lowell Elementary in Tacoma was damaged by an earthquake when Annie Wright Seminary, an all-girls school (at the time), took in some of the students from kindergarten, first, and second grade. Pleased with the functioning of the school the parents urged to continue the school as co-ed and further including higher grades, which was declined.

Sam and Nathalie Brown decided to open a school for boys, and approached Bishop Stephen Bayne of the Episcopal Diocese of Olympia who directed them to take the plan forward. They along with other interested parents purchased 127 acres on Chambers Creek Road and began functioning as a private boys school as approved by Washington Office of the Superintendent of Public Instruction. Their first year in 1957 included 40 boys and five faculty members. In 1970, Charles Wright Academy decided to admit girls and has been co-ed ever since. It was named Charles Wright Academy in honor of Charles Barstow Wright.

== Mascot ==
Tarriers were Irish immigrant railroad workers who contributed to the construction of the United States railroad during the mid-19th century. The job of the Tarrier was to drill holes in rock to blast out railroad tunnels. Tarriers were later immortalized in the 1888 American folk song "Drill, Ye Tarriers, Drill".

According to the school's website, the Tarrier was chosen due to the shared association with the school's namesake, Charles Barstow Wright, and the Tacoma railroad. Wright was a railroad executive who served as President of Northern Pacific Railway from 1875 to 1879 and was instrumental in deciding on Tacoma as its western terminus. Wright was active in the founding of the City of Tacoma and Charles Wright Academy was built and named in his honor in 1957.

The Charles Wright Academy Tarrier is represented by a mascot named Spike, a man wearing a plaid shirt and a bowler hat while holding a mallet. In early years, a student would dress up in a green and white plaid shirt, blue jeans, and work boots. In recent years, a more modern full-body costume, including a mask, has been worn.

On their Lower School, or Elementary, campus the Tarriers have an original bell from a vintage Pacific Northern train line.

== Academics and faculty ==
CWA has a total of 84 teachers among whom 61% have advanced degrees. They have an average of 16 students per class and offer 14 AP courses.

== Athletics ==
A total of 11 sports are offered, including baseball, basketball, cross country, football, golf, soccer, tennis, track and field, ultimate frisbee, and volleyball. Additionally, theatre and knowledge bowl are offered as extracurricular activities. There are numerous student-run clubs at the school.

== Student accomplishments ==
- The sailing team at CWA came first in the 2017 NWISA Double-handed Championship and represented the Pacific Northwest on the national stage.
- In 2017, they won in Cougars' home debut.
- CWA also won in the FIRST Robotics Competition Nisqually League championship.
- In 2019, the CWA Knowledge Bowl team won first in state in the 2A division.
  - Historic placements include first place in 2017, 2015, 2013, 2009, 2008, 2006, 2005, 2004, 2001, 2000, 1999, 1998, 1997, and 1996, in various divisions ranging from a joint A/B to 4A.

== Notable alumni ==
- Penn Badgley, actor
- J'Nai Bridges, opera singer
- Ryann Donnelly, lead vocalist of Schoolyard Heroes
- Nate Mondou, baseball player
