= Columbia High School (White Salmon, Washington) =

Coordinates: 45°44′29″N 121°29′38″W

- 1455 NW Bruin Country Road; White Salmon, Washington 98672; United States

Information
- Type: Public
- School district: White Salmon Valley School District
- Principal: Craig McKee
- Teaching staff: 17.00 (on FTE basis)
- Grades: 9 to 12
- Enrollment: 358 (2023-2024)
- Student to teacher ratio: 21.06
- Colors: White, black and red
- Slogan: Striving for Excellence
- Mascot: Bruin
- Team name: Bruins
- Website: CHS website

Columbia High School is a public high school located in White Salmon, Washington. The school serves about 360 students in grades 9 to 12 in the White Salmon Valley School District.

Columbia High School was named a Bronze Medal School in the 2008 U.S. News/SchoolMatters Best High School ratings. It also was one of 21 high schools across the state to receive Washington State's Achievement Award for Overall Excellence in 2010.

"Columbia High School provides a stimulating learning environment, where students of all abilities thrive academically and socially, and are well-equipped to meet the challenges and expectations of education, work, and life."
