= Riverside Christian School =

Location
- 721 Keys Road; Yakima, (Yakima County), Washington 98901; United States; 46°35′50″N 120°27′30″W

Information
- Type: Private
- Religious affiliation: Protestant
- Established: 1973
- Founder: West Side Baptist Church
- Superintendent: Todd Lundberg
- Elementary Principal: Randy Reynolds
- Chaplain: Rev. Jim Herring
- Grades: Pre-K–12
- Student to teacher ratio: 13:1
- Colors: Navy blue and gold
- Slogan: Rooted in Christ...Ready for Tomorrow
- Athletics: Soccer Basketball; Cross Country; Baseball; Golf; Cheerleading; Volleyball Track & Field
- Mascot: Crusader
- Accreditation: Association of Christian Schools International (ACSI)
- Publication: Riverside Review
- Website: riversidechristianschool.com

Riverside Christian School, founded in 1973, is a private Christian school in Yakima, Washington for preschool through 12th Grade students. Riverside Christian School is a member of the Association of Christian Schools International and Washington Federation of Independent Schools.

== History ==
Riverside Christian School began in 1973 as a ministry of West Side Baptist Church under the leadership of Rev. Hal Campbell and founding Principal Richard D. Lyon. It was originally known as West Side Christian School. The school enrolled 35 students in its first year and has since grown to an enrollment of about 380 students. Riverside has become an independent corporation because of its projected future expansion, while still remaining a part of the Christian community. In the spring of 2007, Riverside became fully accredited by the Association of Christian Schools International and the Northwest Accreditation Commission. Riverside retains the school colors and mascot of West Side Christian School.

For its first seven years, from the 1973-74 school year through the 1980-81 school year, West Side Christian School was housed in the West Side Baptist Church building at 3414 Tieton Drive. For at least the 1978-79 school year, Junior High and Senior High were housed at the Grace Brethren Church at 904 South 26th Avenue. For the 1979-80 school year, all students were back in the 3414 Tieton Drive building.

In the early 80s, West Side Baptist Church built a new building at 6901 Summitview Avenue. West Side students were housed in this building starting in the 1981-82 school year. This building was centered around the school, with the school gym used as the church's main sanctuary. The church remains in this building today and has renamed itself West Side Church.

Student Enrollment History by School Year
School Year	Main Bldg	Student Enrollment	Graduating Seniors
1973-74	3414 Tieton	35	--
1976-77	3414 Tieton	99*	5
1978-79	3414 Tieton	127*	7
1979-80	3414 Tieton	149*	5
2005-06	6901 Summitview	485	
2007-08	721 Keys Road	508	
2009-10	721 Keys Road	480	
2011-12	721 Keys Road	426	
2013-14	721 Keys Road	379	
2015-16	721 Keys Road	334	
2019-20	721 Keys Road	400	"Avg 20/yr"
2021-22	721 Keys Road	417	
2022-23	721 Keys Road	384	
2023-24	721 Keys Road	380	

* Based on counting students in the yearbook; may not be complete.

The high school has 3 special functions per year, including homecoming, toro, and prom. Prom is traditionally planned by the Junior class student council and includes entertainment and dining.
