= Knowledge Bowl =

Academic competition

Knowledge Bowl is the name for several interdisciplinary academic quiz bowl-like competitions across the United States and the world. The questions for many Knowledge Bowl competitions are supplied by the Academic Hallmarks company of Durango, Colorado.

While Knowledge Bowl meet formats are mostly similar across the United States, there are a few regional differences. Knowledge Bowl usually involves teams of four to six students trying to answer questions in a written round and several oral rounds. No team is eliminated in this event, and every team participates in every round. Knowledge Bowl is usually a power competition in which team groupings are rearranged after each round on the basis of their total points accumulated. The written round is a multiple-choice exam taken by each team as a whole. Results of this round are used for seeding teams in the oral rounds. Oral rounds involves three teams per room and uses an electronic lock-out device system. A reader presents the questions, and a team member may buzz in as soon as he or she chooses. If they miss a question, nothing is deducted, but the other teams then may try to answer the question based on who buzzed in first. The winner is the team with the greatest number of points at the end of the meet.

== United States ==
=== Colorado ===
==== History ====
Knowledge Bowl originated in 1976 as a project within the San Juan Board of Cooperative Services in Durango, Colorado. It began in response to a group of area student body leaders who asked if the organization would develop and host some kind of competitive academic activity involving excellent students. The first meet held in Pagosa Springs involved just three high schools. Within two years, it evolved to include scores of invitational meets in addition to regional competitions and a Colorado state championship that has been held annually ever since.

The first statewide Colorado State Knowledge Bowl was held in 1978 at Fort Lewis College in Durango. Most of the competing teams that year came from schools in mountain districts. One of the few Front Range schools in the competition that year, Green Mountain High School in Jefferson County, won the first statewide championship. Green Mountain would go on to triumph in three of the first four years of the competition, taking first place in 1980 and 1981 as well. The event soon attracted educators from Minnesota, Washington, and South Dakota who initiated Knowledge Bowl programs in their home states.

From 1983 to 2012, Colorado teams also participated in a Colorado-specific Knowledge Master Open (KMO) online competition. Teams answered the entire set of 200 questions together, earning a score from 0 to 2000. Each school sent in their scores and in a few weeks received a summary of how the school fared against other Colorado schools. Colorado KMO, along with the KMO program as a whole, was discontinued after the 2012–2013 academic year.

==== Meet format ====
In Colorado, the meets start off with the written round. This round comprises 40 or 60 multiple choice questions that the team attempts to answer correctly. The team can discuss the question only during the written round. Depending on the school, the team may have between three and eight people, however only four will compete in the written round. The scores from the written round determines which teams will compete against each other in the first oral round.

Following the written round teams compete in four oral rounds of forty or fifty questions each during which three teams compete against each other in a single room. Similarly to the written round, only four members of a team may take part in these rounds, but player substitutions may occur in after the first half of the questions. The subject line is read before the question. Teams can buzz at any time, even before the reader has finished reading the question. The team may not talk about the answer to the question, but they may talk about who will answer the question (In the Colorado Springs area meets, no talking period is allowed. However, teammates may use hand signals to determine who will answer). A sheet of paper is allowed for computations and for keeping score. If the first team to buzz in fails to answer the question in 15 seconds or answers incorrectly and no other team has buzzed in either of the other two teams may ask the reader to finish the question and/or repeat the question only once. After each round the scores are totaled and the teams reorganized and assigned to rooms according to their scores. After the final round, the team with the highest score wins the meet.

=== Minnesota ===
==== History ====
Knowledge Bowl was initiated in Minnesota by David Heritage, an administrator in the Hibbing Public Schools. While working with exceptional students in his district, he wished to find a greater challenge. After contacting other schools around the country to see what was done to challenge their best students, as a result Heritage started the first Knowledge Bowl competitions in the state. Mr. Heritage is memorialized for his founding contributions at the State Knowledge Bowl tournament in the Heritage Spirit award. The first Minnesota Knowledge Bowl competition was started by the Lakes Country Service Cooperative of Fergus Falls, Minnesota, in 1979. The first season featured teams from only eight school districts in western Minnesota. Today, Knowledge Bowl has grown to include over 800 teams from across the state and is sponsored by the 11 Service Cooperatives of the State.

==== Meet format ====
Although there is some variation from region to region, most Knowledge Bowl meets follow the same general format. There are two rounds at a KB meet, a Written Round and an Oral Round. The written round (WR) consists of usually 60 multiple-choice questions with five possible answers listed. In the written round, all five members of the team may confer throughout the duration of the round.

However, in the oral rounds (OR), only four team members are allowed to participate. Thus, if a team has five members, one must sit out during the oral round. Oral rounds consist of three sets of 15 questions, 45 in total. Some regions play three oral rounds in a meet, others up to five. Oral rounds feature three teams in one room competing against each other for points. Teams may buzz in at any point during the question. However, they must then answer with whatever information has been given them. If a team buzzes in before the question is read in its entirety, the reader will reread the question for the other team(s), provided they have not yet buzzed in themselves. (The buzzer system is usually set up to have the teams buzz in the style of the game show Split Second, i.e., the teams are called on in the order that they register in the game computer.) Each team in a round has one designated spokesperson. The spokesperson is the only person who is allowed to answer during the 15 second time limit. The spokesperson has the ability to defer their answer to another person on their team as long as they do so before the 15 second time limit.

Some regions randomly assign teams to play each other over the course of a meet, while others use "power ranking". Power ranking is simply the process whereby the top three teams are placed together in one room, the next three in another, and so on. While not all regions use the power ranking method, it is used in the Minnesota Service Cooperatives' State Knowledge Bowl Meet. In 2006, several regions tested a "Strength of Schedule" (SOS) meet format at meets using Power Ranking, and in 2007, this was made the official format. Using SOS, a team will receive a 1.5 point bonus for every question it spends in room 1, a 1-point bonus for every round in room two, and a .5 point bonus for every round in room three. The SOS points are not added to a team's score until after all of the oral rounds. In 2007, SOS was made official Knowledge Bowl procedure, and will be used at the state tournament.

In the Marshall Region, the written round is dispensed with until sub-regions. Each meet consists of 3 oral rounds of 45 questions each. The four-person limit is also not enforced until the sub-region meet. The SOS system is also in place; however, because there is no written round, no SOS points are assigned for the first round.

==== Postseason ====
All the regions throughout Minnesota utilize various postseason formats to select the teams that will represent their region at the state meet. Following the completion of the regular season, the region hosts a sub-regional tournament. In some regions, teams have to qualify by finishing high enough in the standings, while in others, all the teams in the region qualify for Sub-Regions. Following Sub-Regions, a certain number of teams advance to Regions. In some regions, the top teams receive a bye through Sub-Regions straight to Regions, while in others, every team has to qualify through Sub-Regions. At Regions, teams compete for that region's allotted number of State berths.

The 48 teams that qualify for State are ordered by enrollment and then evenly divided, with the larger 24 in Class AA, and the smaller 24 in Class A. All schools from the Metro Region (XI) are automatically placed in Class AA. If one private school qualifies, it is automatically placed in Class AA, regardless of size. If two private schools qualify, the larger is placed in Class AA, and the smaller in Class A. If three private schools qualify, the larger two are placed in Class AA, and the smallest is placed in Class A, and so on. The State meet is held in late April at Cragun's Resort in Brainerd.

==== Regions ====
These are the ten/eleven regions throughout the state of Minnesota, and the city in which they are headquartered:

Northwest (I/II), (Note: While the Northwest Region is designated Regions I & II, it is essentially one region, with all the teams from Northwest Minnesota participating in it.) Thief River Falls; Northeast (III), Mountain Iron; Lakes Country (IV), Fergus Falls; North Central (V), Staples; West Central/Southwest (VI/VIII), (Note: While the West Central and Southwest Regions are both headquartered in Marshall and operated under the same auspices, they are essentially separate regions in which teams from their respective region participate apart from teams in the other region.) Marshall; Central (VII), St. Cloud; South Central (IX), North Mankato; Southeast (X), Rochester; Metro (XI), St. Anthony.

==== State tournament ====
The Minnesota Knowledge Bowl state tournament is held annually at Cragun's resort in Brainerd, Minnesota. The tournament is a two-day event, with the first day consisting of a banquet dinner and the written round, and the second day comprising five oral rounds.

=== Washington ===
==== History ====
Imported from Colorado, the first Knowledge Bowl in Washington state for high school students in grades nine through twelve was conducted by the Olympic Educational Service District 114 in 1981. Within several years, each of the nine Educational Service Districts were holding regional competitions and the first statewide tournament was held in 1983.

==== Regional competitions ====
Regional competitions are held between November and early March. Each ESD decides the format that will be used in their respective regions and how many regional competitions will be held.

The regional competitions that determine which teams will advance to the state tournament typically take place in February or early March. The number of teams each ESD region is allotted for the state tournament varies each year with the number of schools that compete at each division (based on Washington Interscholastic Activities Association classification) in each region. The top 18 teams in Divisions 4A, 2A, 1A, and 2B (top 12 in Divisions 3A and 1B) advance to the state tournament.

==== State tournament ====
The state tournament takes place annually in March. The format for the state tournament begins with a written round of 50 multiple-choice questions with a 35-minute time limit. This is followed by four Preliminary oral rounds of 50 questions each, setting the stage for the Semi-Final and Championship rounds, also oral rounds of 50 questions each.

=== Tennessee ===
CBS affiliate WREG produces a televised high school quiz tournament for teams in the Memphis metropolitan area.

== International ==
=== Europe ===
Knowledge Bowl is sponsored internationally by the Central and Eastern European Schools Association (CEESA) at the middle school and high school level. Due to the large number of teams entering, competitions are split between two European cities, different each year. Additionally, two small Knowledge Bowl competitions are held in the Republic of Georgia.

=== Central America ===
Knowledge Bowl is also organized in Central America by Association of American Schools in Central America (AASCA), and is limited to AASCA schools. International level competition is held in late November and features schools from Guatemala, Honduras, El Salvador, Nicaragua, Costa Rica, and Panama. The national level dates vary depending on the country, and are also held once a year. The national levels are also limited to American schools; the Honduran Knowledge Bowl nationals are organized by Association of Bilingual Schools of Honduras (ABSH) and are also limited to ABSH. In El Salvador, the national competition is organised by the Association of Bilingual Schools of San Salvador, for its five member institutions. Four are American and one is British.

In 2008, 2009, and 2010, the event was won by Colegio Maya of Guatemala for the junior varsity level, the most consecutive titles in the event's history. In 2011 and 2012 the title of varsity champions was won by the Escuela International de Tegucigalpa (EIT), with an outstanding performance of the two time MVP, Ricardo Cálix, becoming the first consecutive winner of the award in the history of Knowledge Bowl World Championships.

Although the Knowledge Bowl World Championships were paused in 2013, they resumed the following year. The International School of Panama claimed victory in 2014, where they became the undisputed champions in an effort that was led by Carlos Irisarri and Nicolas Braun Melendez, who came back the following year as team captain to lead his team to yet another championship. These consecutive wins by the Panamanian school became only the second time in the tournament's history that a school managed to win back to back championships. Nicolas Bran finished as the highest scorer of the competition in 2015 and was rightfully considered the unanimous decision for MVP that year.

In 2018, the National Knowledge Bowl, organised by ABSH (Association of Bilingual Schools in Honduras) was won by Macris School, which managed to win first places in the Varsity category and the Junior Varsity category, as well as second place in the Middle School category.

In 2022, AASCA Knowledge Bowl was won by the American School of Tegucigalpa (AST), who defeated Colegio Americano de Guatemala (CAG) in the finals. In 2023, CAG won in the finals against AST, who was the only team to defeat them in the round robin stage of the tournament. The following year, CAG went undefeated and once again bested AST in the finals for back-to-back championships.

==== Meet format ====
Schools that participate in the tournaments play each other school during the round robin phase of the tournament on the first two days. Depending on the number of participating schools, the teams with the best records in the round robin phase will go to the elimination bracket on day three, with tiebreakers decided by head-to-head records against other tied schools, then by total points scored. Teams that lose in the semifinal round will play each other for the bronze medal, and those that win will play for the gold medal, with the loser of the final getting the silver medal.

A team is composed of five students, four of whom participate in a game lasting thirty minutes. After every thirty-minute game, substitutions can be made. In every game, only two teams compete against each other. After the thirty minutes are up, the game enters the lightning round (see below), a set of five final questions with mildly altered rules. If after the lightning round, there is still a tie between the two teams, the game enters a sudden-death mode, in which the first person to gain any number of points wins, but a team that loses a point also loses the match.

For a normal toss-up question, a team that buzzes in and answers correctly gains two points and a bonus question. In toss-up questions, team members are not allowed to communicate with each other, and are given 10 seconds to buzz in, and 30 seconds plus the use of scratch paper if the question is a math question. If a team member buzzes in and answers incorrectly, the team loses one point, and the question is repeated for the second team to answer. This is called a rebound. In rebounds, an additional 10 seconds are given for the second team, and team members can communicate with each other, but only the team captain can declare the answer. When a rebound question is answered correctly, one point is given. If a rebound question is answered incorrectly, no points are taken away. Bonus questions are similar to rebounds, but are a bit different. Only the team that acquired the bonus question by answering a tossup correctly can answer it, and team members can discuss the question, but again, only the team captain can give the answer. When a bonus is answered correctly, three points are given, whereas if it is answered incorrectly, no points are taken away. Bonus questions are not cumulative, and once one is answered, another toss-up is given. If no one buzzes in for a toss-up question, no one gains or loses points. It should also be noted that if rebounds are answered correctly, they do not bring with them a bonus question. Once the 30 minutes of the match are up, the lightning round takes action. The only difference between this round and the normal round is that there are only 5 questions, and answering a rebound correctly is rewarded by a bonus question. Some tournaments may allow bouncebacks on bonuses, which allow the opposing team to earn points for correctly answering bonus parts the other team misses.

== See also ==
- College Bowl, a formerly televised college academic competition
