= Educational service district (Washington) =

Regional education unit in Washington state, U.S.

An Educational Service District, or ESD, is a regional education unit in the U.S. state of Washington. Organizationally different from a school district, a single ESD in Washington serves dozens of school districts. ESDs are established to allow school districts to work, plan, and buy equipment collectively. In Washington, they also provide other intermediary services between the Office of Superintendent of Public Instruction and local school districts.

== Legislative role ==
There are nine statutory regional service agencies in Washington. Created by the legislature in 1969, the expressed purpose of an ESD is to ensure equal educational opportunities for quality education and lifelong learning for all. In addition to acting as a liaison between local districts and the State Office of the Superintendent of Public Instruction to deliver programs mandated by the state, Washington's ESDs are public entities, which operate in a highly entrepreneurial fashion.

In 1967, ten school districts united to share software, hardware, and centralized technology support costs. The result of this collaboration created the WSIPC Cooperative WSIPC–a unique nonprofit public agency. It is now under the umbrella of ESDs.

== Scope of service ==
ESDs were first created as a system of county school offices overseeing the establishment and operation of local school districts for the state. Eventually, that system developed into large media distribution centers, also serving as financial advisers for schools. Now, ESDs are both regional service providers and brokers among schools, businesses, and governments for various school administrative functions and children's education, health, and social services. An ESD's scope includes but is not limited to: curriculum, instructional support and assessment, business operations, transportation, youth employment, printing, public relations, data processing, payroll, fingerprinting, network support, statewide computer networks, traffic safety education, construction management, preschool programs, homeless transportation, para-educator training, and special education.

== List of ESDs ==
Washington state has nine ESDs that oversee 295 school districts.

- ESD 101 (Northeast ESD) in Spokane
- ESD 105 in Yakima
- ESD 112 in Vancouver
- ESD 113 (Capital Region ESD) in Tumwater
- ESD 114 (Olympic ESD) in Bremerton
- ESD 121 (Puget Sound ESD) in Renton
- ESD 123 in Pasco
- ESD 171 (North Central ESD) in Wenatchee
- ESD 189 (Northwest ESD) in Anacortes

== See also ==
- List of school districts in Washington
- Washington State Office of Superintendent of Public Instruction
