= List of high schools in Washington (state) =

This is a list of high schools in the state of Washington.

== Adams County ==
- Othello High School, Othello
- Lind-Ritzville High School, Ritzville
- Washtucna High School, Washtucna

== Asotin County ==
- Asotin Junior Senior High School, Asotin
- Clarkston High School, Clarkston

== Benton County ==
- Kiona-Benton City High School, Benton City
- Delta High School, Pasco (Regional STEM Highschool)

=== Kennewick ===
- Benton/Franklin Juvenile Justice Center
- Kamiakin High School
- Kennewick High School
- River View High School
- Southridge High School
- Tri City Area Vocational Skills Center

=== Prosser ===
- Prosser Falls Education Center
- Prosser High School

=== Richland ===
- Hanford High School
- Liberty Christian School
- Richland High School
- Rivers Edge Alternative High School

== Chelan County ==
- Cascade High School, Leavenworth
- Cashmere High School, Cashmere
- Chelan High School, Chelan
- Entiat Junior Senior High School, Entiat
- Manson Junior Senior High School, Manson

=== Wenatchee ===
- Vocational Skills Center North Central
- Wenatchee High School
- Westside High School

== Clallam County ==
- Clallam Bay High School, Clallam Bay
- Crescent High School, near Port Angeles
- Forks High School, Forks
- Port Angeles High School, Port Angeles
- Sequim High School, Sequim

=== La Push ===
- La Push High School
- Quileute Tribal School

== Clark County ==
- La Center High School, La Center
- Ridgefield High School, Ridgefield
- Washougal High School, Washougal

=== Battle Ground ===
- Battle Ground High School
- Cornerstone Christian Academy for Learning and Leadership
- Columbia Adventist Academy
- Firm Foundation Christian School
- Fort Vancouver High School
- Henrietta Lacks Health and Bioscience High School
- Heritage High School

=== Brush Prairie ===
- Hockinson High School
- Prairie High School

=== Camas ===
- Camas High School
- Discovery High School

=== Vancouver ===
- Columbia River High School
- Cornerstone Christian Schools
- Evergreen High School
- Hudson's Bay High School
- King's Way Christian Schools
- Lewis and Clark High School
- Mountain View High School
- Seton Catholic High School
- Skyview High School
- Union High School
- Vancouver iTech Preparatory
- Vancouver School of Arts and Academics

== Columbia County ==
- Dayton High School, Dayton

== Cowlitz County ==
- Castle Rock High School, Castle Rock
- Kalama High School, Kalama
- Toutle Lake High School, Toutle
- Woodland High School, Woodland

=== Kelso ===
- Cornerstone Community Christian School
- Kelso High School
- Loowit High School

=== Longview ===
- R. A. Long High School
- Mark Morris High School

== Douglas County ==
- Bridgeport High School, Bridgeport
- Eastmont High School, East Wenatchee
- Mansfield High School, Mansfield
- Waterville High School, Waterville

== Ferry County ==
- Curlew High School, Curlew
- Inchelium High School, Inchelium
- Republic Junior-Senior High School, Republic

== Franklin County ==
- Connell High School, Connell
- Kahlotus High School, Kahlotus
- Palouse Junction High School, Connell

=== Pasco ===
- Chiawana High School
- Pasco High School
- Tri-Cities Prep
- Delta High School

== Garfield County ==
- Pomeroy Junior Senior High School, Pomeroy

== Grant County ==
- Almira-Coulee-Hartline High School, Coulee City
- Ephrata Senior High School, Ephrata
- Lake Roosevelt High School, Coulee Dam
- Quincy High School, Quincy
- Royal High School, Royal City
- Skilskin High School, Grand Coulee
- Soap Lake High School, Soap Lake
- Wahluke High School, Mattawa
- Warden High School, Warden

=== Moses Lake ===
- Moses Lake High School
- Moses Lake Christian Academy

== Grays Harbor County ==
- Elma High School, Elma
- Hoquiam High School, Hoquiam
- Lake Quinault High School, Amanda Park
- Montesano Junior-Senior High School, Montesano
- North Beach High School, Ocean Shores
- Ocosta High School, Westport

=== Aberdeen ===
- Harbor Learning Center
- J. M. Weatherwax High School
- Wishkah Valley School

== Island County ==
- Coupeville High School, Coupeville
- Oak Harbor High School, Oak Harbor
- South Whidbey High School, Langley

== Jefferson County ==
- Chimacum High School, Chimacum
- Quilcene High School, Quilcene

=== Port Townsend ===
- Jefferson Community School
- Port Townsend High School

== King County ==
- Cedarcrest High School, Duvall
- Enumclaw High School, Enumclaw
- Evergreen High School, White Center
- Inglemoor High School, Kenmore
- Kentwood High School, Covington
- Mount Si High School, Snoqualmie
- Skykomish High School, Skykomish
- Tahoma High School, Maple Valley
- Two Rivers School, North Bend
- Vashon Island High School, Vashon

=== Auburn ===
- Auburn Adventist Academy
- Auburn High School
- Auburn Mountainview High School
- Auburn Riverside High School
- Redeemer Christian School
- Thomas Jefferson High School
- West Auburn High School

=== Bellevue ===
- Bellevue Christian School
- Bellevue High School
- Forest Ridge School of the Sacred Heart
- Interlake High School
- International School
- Newport High School
- Sammamish High School

=== Bothell ===
- Bothell High School
- Cedar Park Christian School
- North Creek High School
- Innovation Lab High School

=== Burien ===
- Highline High School
- John F Kennedy Memorial High School

=== Des Moines ===
- Mount Rainier High School
- Evergreen Lutheran High School

=== Federal Way ===
- Decatur High School
- Federal Way High School
- Harry S. Truman High School
- Internet Academy
- Todd Beamer High School

=== Issaquah ===
- Gibson Ek High School
- Issaquah High School

=== Kent ===
- Kent-Meridian High School
- Kentlake High School
- Kentridge High School

=== Kirkland ===
- Eastside Preparatory School
- Emerson High School
- International Community School
- Juanita High School
- Lake Washington High School
- Puget Sound Adventist Academy

=== Mercer Island ===
- Mercer Island High School
- Northwest Yeshiva High School

=== Redmond ===
- The Bear Creek School
- The Overlake School
- Redmond High School
- Tesla STEM High School

=== Renton ===
- Hazen High School
- Liberty Senior High School
- Lindbergh High School
- Renton High School

=== Sammamish ===
- Eastlake High School
- Eastside Catholic School
- Skyline High School

=== SeaTac ===
- Seattle Christian School
- Tyee High School

=== Seattle ===
==== Seattle Public Schools ====
- Ballard High School
- The Center School
- Grover Cleveland High School
- Chief Sealth International High School
- Franklin High School
- Garfield High School
- Nathan Hale High School
- Ingraham High School
- Lincoln High School
- Middle College High School
- The Nova Project
- Rainier Beach High School
- Roosevelt High School
- South Lake High School
- West Seattle High School

==== Private Schools ====
- Bishop Blanchet High School
- The Bush School
- Cristo Rey Jesuit Seattle High School
- Dartmoor School (Bellevue/Issaquah/Seattle/Woodinville)
- Holy Names Academy
- Lakeside School
- Northwest School
- O'Dea High School
- Seattle Academy of Arts and Sciences
- Seattle Preparatory School
- Seattle Urban Academy
- Seattle Waldorf School
- Spring Academy
- University Preparatory Academy

=== Shoreline ===
- King's Schools
- Shorecrest High School
- Shorewood High School

=== Tukwila ===
Foster High School

- Raisbeck Aviation High School

=== Woodinville ===
- Chrysalis School
- Woodinville High School

== Kitsap County ==
- North Kitsap High School, Poulsbo

=== Bainbridge Island ===
- Bainbridge High School
- Eagle Harbor High School

=== Bremerton ===
- Bremerton High School
- Olympic High School

=== Kingston ===
- Kingston High School

=== Port Orchard ===
- South Kitsap High School
- Discovery Alternative High School

=== Silverdale ===
- Central Kitsap High School
- Klahowya Secondary School

== Kittitas County ==
- Cle Elum-Roslyn High School, Cle Elum
- Easton High School, Easton
- Ellensburg High School, Ellensburg
- Kittitas High School, Kittitas
- Thorp High School, Thorp

== Klickitat County ==
- Bickleton High School, Bickleton
- Columbia High School, White Salmon
- Glenwood Secondary School, Glenwood
- Goldendale High School, Goldendale
- Klickatat High School, Klickitat
- Lyle Middle & High School, Lyle
- Trout Lake High School, Trout Lake
- Wishram High School, Wishram

== Lewis County ==
- Adna High School, Adna
- Centralia High School, Centralia
- Morton High School, Morton
- Mossyrock Middle & High School, Mossyrock
- Napavine High School, Napavine
- Onalaska High School, Onalaska
- Pe Ell High School, Pe Ell
- Toledo High School, Toledo
- White Pass Junior-Senior High School, Randle
- Winlock Senior High School, Winlock

=== Chehalis ===
- Green Hill School
- W. F. West High School

== Lincoln County ==
- Christian Heritage School, Edwall
- Creston High School, Creston
- Davenport High School, Davenport
- Harrington High School, Harrington
- Odessa High School, Odessa
- Reardan High School, Reardan
- Sprague High School, Sprague
- Wilbur High School, Wilbur

== Mason County ==
- Mary M Knight School, Elma
- North Mason Senior High School, Belfair

=== Shelton ===
- Cedar High School
- Choice Alternative High School
- Shelton High School

== Okanogan County ==
- Brewster High School, Brewster
- Liberty Bell Junior-Senior High School, Winthrop
- Okanogan Junior-Senior High School, Okanogan
- Oroville High School, Oroville
- Pateros High School, Pateros
- Tonasket High School, Tonasket
- Lake Roosevelt High School, Coulee Dam

=== Omak ===
- Omak Alternative High School
- Omak High School

== Pacific County ==
- Ilwaco High School, Ilwaco
- Naselle Junior Senior High Schools, Naselle
- Raymond Junior Senior High School, Raymond
- South Bend High School, South Bend
- Willapa Valley Junior Senior High School, Menlo

== Pend Oreille County ==
- Cusick Junior Senior High School, Cusick
- Newport High School, Newport
- Selkirk Junior-Senior High School, Ione

== Pierce County ==
- Bonney Lake High School, Bonney Lake
- Curtis Senior High School, University Place
- Eatonville High School, Eatonville
- Graham-Kapowsin High School, Graham
- Orting High School, Orting
- Steilacoom High School, Steilacoom
- Sumner High School, Sumner
- White River High School, Buckley

=== Gig Harbor ===
- Gig Harbor High School
- Henderson Bay Alternative High School
- Peninsula High School

=== Lakewood ===
- Clover Park High School
- Lakes High School

=== Parkland ===
- Gates Secondary School
- Franklin Pierce High School
- Washington High School

=== Puyallup ===
- Cascade Christian Schools
- Emerald Ridge High School
- Puyallup High School
- Governor John R. Rogers High School
- E.B. Walker High School

=== Spanaway ===
- Bethel High School
- Spanaway Lake High School

=== Tacoma ===
==== Public Schools ====
- Fife High School
- Henry Foss High School
- Lincoln High School
- Mount Tahoma High School
- Oakland Alternative High School
- Science and Math Institute
- Silas High School (formerly "Wilson")
- Stadium High School
- Tacoma School of the Arts

==== Private Schools ====
- Annie Wright School
- Bellarmine Preparatory School
- Charles Wright Academy
- Covenant High School
- Life Christian School
- Mount Rainier Lutheran High School
- Tacoma Baptist High School

== San Juan County ==
- Friday Harbor High School, Friday Harbor

== Skagit County ==
- Anacortes High School, Anacortes
- Burlington-Edison High School, Burlington
- Concrete High School, Concrete
- La Conner High School, La Conner

=== Mount Vernon ===
- Mount Vernon Christian High School
- Mount Vernon High School

=== Sedro-Woolley ===
- Sedro-Woolley High School, Sedro-Woolley
- State Street High School, Sedro-Woolley

== Skamania County ==
- Stevenson High School, Stevenson

== Snohomish County ==
- Darrington High School, Darrington
- Granite Falls High School, Granite Falls
- Henry M. Jackson High School, Mill Creek
- Kamiak High School, Mukilteo
- Lake Stevens High School, Lake Stevens
- Lakewood High School (Washington), Lakewood
- Lynnwood High School, near Lynnwood
- Meadowdale High School, Lynnwood
- Monroe High School, Monroe
- Mountlake Terrace High School, Mountlake Terrace
- Sultan Senior High School, Sultan

=== Arlington ===
- Arlington Christian School
- Arlington High School
- Weston High School

=== Edmonds ===
- Edmonds Heights K-12
- Edmonds Woodway High School
- Scriber Lake High School
- Solomon Christian School

=== Everett ===
- ACES/Big Picture High School
- Archbishop Murphy High School
- Cascade High School
- Everett High School
- Hillcrest Academy
- Mariner High School
- Montessori Schools-Snohomish County
- Northwest Christian School
- Sequoia High School

=== Marysville ===
- Grace Academy
- Legacy High School
- Marysville Getchell High School
- Marysville Pilchuck High School
- Master's Touch Christian School
- Tulalip Heritage High School

=== Snohomish ===
- AIM High School
- Glacier Peak High School
- Snohomish High School

=== Stanwood ===
- Lincoln Hill High School
- Stanwood High School

== Spokane County ==
- Deer Park High School, Deer Park
- Freeman High School, Rockford
- Mead Senior High School, Fairwood
- Medical Lake High School, Medical Lake
- Mt. Spokane High School, Mead
- Lakeside High School, Nine Mile Falls
- Northwest Christian School, Colbert
- Reardan Middle & High School, Reardan
- Ridgeline High School, Liberty Lake
- Riverside High School, Chattaroy
- Rosalia High School, Rosalia
- St. John/Endicott High School, St. John
- Tekoa High School, Tekoa

=== Cheney ===
- Cheney High School
- Three Springs High School

=== Spangle ===
- Liberty High School
- Upper Columbia Academy

=== Spokane ===
==== Public Schools ====
- The Community School at Bancroft
- Joel E. Ferris High School
- Lewis and Clark High School
- M.E.A.D. Alternative High School
- NEWTech Skills Center
- North Central High School
- On Track Academy
- John R. Rogers High School
- Shadle Park High School

==== Private Schools ====
- Enlightium Academy
- Gonzaga Preparatory School
- Palisades Christian Academy
- St. George's School
- Saint Michael's Academy

=== Spokane Valley ===
==== Public Schools ====
- Central Valley High School
- Dishman Hills High School
- East Valley High School
- Mica Peak High School
- Spokane Valley High School
- University High School
- West Valley High School

==== Private Schools ====
- Covenant Christian School
- The Oaks Classical Christian Academy
- Valley Christian School

== Stevens County ==
- Colville High School, Colville
- Jenkins High School, Chewelah
- Kettle Falls High School, Kettle Falls
- Northport High School, Northport
- Mary Walker High School, Springdale
- Wellpinit Junior Senior High School, Wellpinit
- Lakeside High School, Nine Mile Falls

== Thurston County ==
- Rainier High School, Rainier
- Rochester High School, Rochester
- Tenino High School, Tenino

=== Lacey ===
- Envision Career Academy
- North Thurston High School
- Northwest Christian High School
- Pope John Paul II High School
- River Ridge High School
- Timberline High School

=== Olympia ===
- Avanti High School
- Capital High School
- Olympia High School

=== Tumwater ===
- A.G. West Black Hills High School
- Cascadia High School
- New Market Skills Center
- Tumwater High School

=== Yelm ===
- Eagle View Christian School
- Yelm High School

== Wahkiakum County ==
- Wahkiakum High School, Cathlamet

== Walla Walla County ==
- Columbia High School, Burbank
- Prescott Junior Senior High School, Prescott
- Touchet High School, Touchet
- Waitsburg High School, Waitsburg

=== College Place ===
- College Place High School
- Walla Walla Valley Academy

=== Walla Walla ===
- DeSales Catholic High School
- Walla Walla High School

== Whatcom County ==
- Blaine High School, Blaine
- Ferndale High School, Ferndale
- Mount Baker Senior High School, Deming
- Nooksack Valley High School, Everson

=== Bellingham ===
- Bellingham High School
- Explorations Academy
- Lummi Nation School
- Meridian High School
- Options High School
- Sehome High School
- Squalicum High School

=== Lynden ===
- Cornerstone Christian School
- Lynden High School
- Lynden Christian High School

== Whitman County ==
- Colfax High School, Colfax
- Colton High School, Colton
- Garfield-Palouse High School, Palouse
- Lacrosse High School, Lacrosse
- Oakesdale High School, Oakesdale
- St. John/Endicott High School, St. John
- Tekoa High School, Tekoa

=== Pullman ===
- Pullman High School
- Pullman Christian School

== Yakima County ==
- Grandview High School, Grandview
- Granger High School, Granger
- Highland High School, Cowiche
- La Salle High School, Union Gap
- Mabton Junior-Senior High School, Mabton
- Naches Valley High School, Naches
- Selah High School, Selah
- Wapato High School, Wapato
- Zillah High School, Zillah

=== Sunnyside ===
- Sunnyside Christian High School
- Sunnyside High School

=== Toppenish ===
- Eagle High School
- Toppenish High School
- Yakama Nation Tribal School

=== White Swan ===
- Wellpinit-Fort Semco High School
- White Swan High School

=== Yakima ===
- A.C. Davis High School
- East Valley High School
- Eisenhower High School
- Riverside Christian School
- West Valley High School

== Defunct schools ==
- Vancouver Christian High School (closed 2012)
- Eltopia High School, Eltopia (closed 1964)
- Midway Alternative School, Oak Harbor (closed 2006)
- Broadway High School (closed 1946)
- John Marshall Alternative School (closed)
- Queen Anne High School (closed 1981)
- St. Christopher Academy (closed)
- Seattle Lutheran High School (closed 2022)
- Shoreline High School (closed 1986)
- Spectrum Community School (closed 2010)

== See also ==
- List of school districts in Washington
- List of private schools in Washington
- List of high schools in Washington by WIAA league alignment
