= Hannibal Blair =

American politician

Member of the Washington House of Representatives
- In office 1889–1891

Personal details
- Born: September 19, 1855 Polk County, Missouri, United States
- Died: June 10, 1942 (aged 86) Elma, Washington, United States
- Party: Republican

Hannibal J. Blair (September 19, 1855 – June 10, 1942) was an American politician in the state of Washington. He lived in Bickleton and served in the Washington House of Representatives from 1889 to 1891.

== See also ==
- Politics in the United States
