= Cleveland, Washington =

Community in Washington, US

Coordinates: 45°58′14″N 120°21′06″W

Cleveland is a community in Klickitat County, Washington. It is located within the Bickleton CDP.

Cleveland was first settled in 1879 by Ripley Dodge, who named it for the city of his native state of Ohio.

Cleveland contains an old cemetery and a rodeo. The rodeo, the oldest in the state, has been completely refurbished. Also on the rodeo grounds is a 100-year-old Spillman carousel that has been completely refurbished thanks to grants and private funds. The closest town is Bickleton. An annual rodeo is held the 2nd weekend in June along with Pioneer days in which the carousel is restored to operating conditions as it was back in 1907, with the original carousel horses which are housed in the Museum in Bickleton.

Cleveland is home to a carousel. Per R. Bollinger, former owner of The Oaks amusement park and benefactor of the Oaks Park Association (the non-profit he set up to perpetuate The Oaks), the carousel was one of the few rides owned by The Oaks when it opened May 30, 1905. It was sold to the Bickleton/Cleveland group in 1928 along with the band organ and ticket booth. Over the years, the method used to turn this machine was modified from using donkeys or small horses to a steam engine and, later, a tractor engine. The communities of Bickleton and Cleveland have kept the carousel maintained throughout the years.

Cleveland's most famous resident was William O. Douglas, the longest sitting member of the U.S. Supreme Court. Douglas's father was a Presbyterian minister, and moved the family to Cleveland from California in order to serve the local residents, but when he died, the family moved to Yakima.
