= Liberty Christian School =

Liberty Christian School may refer to:

- Liberty Christian School (Anderson, Indiana)
- Liberty Christian School (Argyle, Texas)
- Liberty Christian School (Richland, Washington)
- Liberty Christian Preparatory School, in Florida
