= River City Leadership Academy =

RiverCity Leadership Academy

Location
- 8818 E. Grace Ave. Spokane, Washington 99212; United States
- Coordinates: 47°40′59″N 117°17′12″W

Information
- School type: Public High School
- School district: West Valley School District
- Principal: Barb Knauss
- Teaching staff: 3+
- Grades: 9-12
- Enrollment: 40
- Colors: Blue & Black
- Slogan: We are the future of education!
- Mascot: Wolfpack
- Information: (509) 922-5478
- Website: rla.wvsd.org

RiverCity Leadership Academy (also known as RLA) is a fully accredited high school in which students share common wilderness experiences, use applied technology, study under a group of teachers and create their own projects according to individual interests. RiverCity Leadership Academy is the first Project-based high school in Washington state to utilize this successful and revolutionary hands-on approach to learning developed by the EdVisions coop. The student projects will provide individualized HSPE preparation and T & I certifications. The school is a West Valley School District program serving Spokane youth, grades 9–12. Students attend school full-time in pursuit of an education that will leave them Citizenship, college, and Career ready.
