= List of killings by law enforcement officers in the United States, October 2011 =

This is a list of people reported killed by non-military law enforcement officers in the United States in October 2011, whether in the line of duty or not, and regardless of reason or method. The listing documents the occurrence of a death, making no implications regarding wrongdoing or justification on the part of the person killed or officer involved. Killings are arranged by date of the incident that caused death. Different death dates, if known, are noted in the description. The table below lists 31 people.

== October 2011 ==
Date	Name (Age) of Deceased	State (city)	Description
2011-10-31	Bitz, Jason	California (Lakewood)	Shot by off-duty police officer while apparently trying to steal a van outside the officer's home. He had permission to use the van, but was using a screwdriver to open the door. He ran after being confronted by the officer, who shot him multiple times after Bitz reached for his waistband. No weapon was found at the scene.
2011-10-31	Anthony R. Blackmon (52)	Texas (Georgetown)	
2011-10-30	Colbert, DeJuan (27)	Kansas (Wichita)	Officers were responding to a robbery alarm at a Dollar General store. 27-year-old Colbert was allegedly standing at the door with a knife, and approached the officer who commanded him to drop it. That officer shot and killed Colbert.
2011-10-28	Collins, Jason Paul	Colorado (Greeley)	Shot after touching his own gun during a meeting to exchange child pornography with undercover federal officials.
2011-10-28	Martinez, Gregory (20)	Arizona (Avondale)	
2011-10-27	Williams, Elliott Earl	Oklahoma (Tulsa)	Williams died in Tulsa County Jail, OK. He died from "complications of vertebrospinal injuries due to blunt force trauma" and dehydration following several days of neglect by prison authorities.
2011-10-25	Hilaire, Herson; Hilaire, Hedson	Florida (Miami-Dade)	Shot after striking a police officer with vehicle while fleeing home during a drug probe.
2011-10-25	Barreto, Jesus (23)	Florida (Lake Worth)	
2011-10-24	Peterson, Josh	California (Antioch)	The 33-year-old man was shot to death less than a block from him home after refusing to drop his gun. Police were responding to a report of a fugitive in the area; Peterson was wanted on two arrest warrants.
2011-10-24	Ceja, Pedro Salgado	Washington (Royal City)	Shot while chasing police with shovel in hand. Officer was responding to report of domestic violence and was attempting to arrest Ceja for investigation of second-degree assault and unlawful imprisonment.
2011-10-23	Evans, Eric Blaine	Washington (Seattle)	Shot after physically attacking a police detective. The officer was tracking Evans as a prime suspect in a recent stabbing murder.
2011-10-22	Westby, Aaron	Washington (Tacoma)	Shot after reaching for gun in glove box after resisting arrest. Police had approached Westby regarding the stolen pickup he was inside.
2011-10-22	II Nida, Michael	California (Downey)	The night of the shooting, Downey PD officers detained Nida because he matched the description of a suspect in an armed robbery, but Nida fought them and escaped. Nida was detained a second time, only to escape and run again. According to sheriff's investigators, Nida then turned toward police in an aggressive manner, and was shot 5 times in the chest and back. Nida was unarmed, likely running from police because of a small amount of marijuana in his possession and a known distrust for police.
2011-10-20	Newsome, Kotrell Omar	Maryland (Lexington Park)	Shot after violently resisting arrest for domestic disturbance. Stun gun was ineffective.
2011-10-18	Sepulveda, Mark Anthony	Colorado (Denver)	Shot while attempting a carjacking. Police were responding to report of armed robbery of store.
2011-10-17	Pinkney, Adolphus	Pennsylvania (Philadelphia)	Shot after ignoring command to drop weapon and then firing on police.
2011-10-16	Marksbury, Kennen	Texas (Cibolo)	Shot after threatening police with a weapon. Police were responding to report of a suicidal person.
2011-10-15	Valenzuela, David	Arizona (Phoenix)	Shot after ignoring commands to drop weapon and pointing gun at police. Police were responding to reports of gunshots and assault at bus terminal.
2011-10-15	Parera, Leonardo	New Jersey (Mountain Lakes)	Shot after firing on police. Police were responding to Parera's call to 911 after Parera killed co-worker and threatened to escalate violence if approached.
2011-10-15	Stafford, Joetavius	Georgia (Atlanta)	Shot during confrontation with transit system police officer.
2011-10-14	Hernandez, Jose (34)	Florida (Miami)	
2011-10-13	LaFave Jr, Derryl; Cheyne, Kristopher	Michigan (Muskegon)	Shot after robbing bank, killing an officer with vehicle while fleeing, and firing on police.
2011-10-12	Post, Charles Arthur	Pennsylvania (Lower Burrell)	Shot after fatally shooting police officer. Post was wanted on felony charges of shooting at his boss.
2011-10-12	Bocock, John	Oregon (Myrtle Creek)	Shot after non-fatally shooting associate and refusing to drop weapon.
2011-10-11	Aguilar, Jesus	Colorado (Golden)	Shot while attempting escape from police custody in a medical facility. Aguilar was serving jail sentence for multiple violent offenses.
2011-10-10	Humes, Glenn (28)	Florida (Miami-Dade)	Shot after stealing a police car and attempting to use it to run over a police officer. Deceased had recently fled scene of accident where he was driving vehicle that struck a taxi killing the driver.
2011-10-10	Harris, Sean (24)	Florida (Pensacola)	
2011-10-07	Almonte, Jose (49)	Florida (Miami Gardens)	
2011-10-04	Cecil, Vincent (32)	Florida (Deland)	
2011-10-03	unnamed female (57)	New York (Manhattan)	Shot after refusing to drop knife and lunging at police officers. Police were responding to report of fight involving the deceased at a homeless shelter.
2011-10-01	Bassler, Aaron	California (Fort Bragg)	Shot after extensive month-long manhunt. Bassler was primary suspect in two recent murders and had fired on police during the manhunt

== See also ==
- Death in custody § United States
- Henry A. Wallace Police Crime Public Database
- List of cases of police brutality
- List of countries with annual rates and counts for killings by law enforcement officers
- List of law enforcement officers killed in the line of duty in the United States
- List of law enforcement officers convicted for an on-duty killing in the United States
- List of shootings by US immigration agents
- List of police reforms related to the George Floyd protests
- List of unarmed African Americans killed by law enforcement officers in the United States
- Lists of killings by law enforcement officers
- Police brutality in the United States
- Police misconduct § United States
- Police riot § United States
- Police use of deadly force in the United States
