= Ken Greene =

American football player and coach (born 1956)

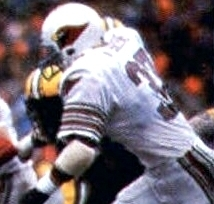
- Greene with the St. Louis Cardinals in 1982

No. 37, 28
- Position: Safety

Personal information
- Born: May 8, 1956 (age 70); Lewiston, Idaho, U.S.
- Listed height: 6 ft 3 in (1.91 m)
- Listed weight: 203 lb (92 kg)

Career information
- High school: Omak (Omak, Washington)
- College: Washington State (1974–1977)
- NFL draft: 1978: 1st round, 19th overall pick

Career history

Playing
- St. Louis Cardinals (1978–1982); San Diego Chargers (1983–1984)

Coaching
- Vallivue HS (1994; assistant); Fresno State (1995–1999; GA / DB / LB); Purdue (2000–2002; DB); Washington State (2003–2006; DB)

Awards and highlights
- PFWA All-Rookie Team (1978); Second-team All-Pac-8 (1977)

Career NFL statistics
- Interceptions: 15
- Fumble recoveries: 6
- Sacks: 2
- Stats at Pro Football Reference

Kenneth Edward Greene (born May 8, 1956) is an American former professional football player who was a safety in the National Football League (NFL) for seven seasons. He was drafted by the St. Louis Cardinals in the first round of the 1978 NFL draft. Greene also played for the San Diego Chargers.

== Early life ==
Born on May 8, 1956, in Lewiston, Idaho, Greene graduated from Omak High School in 1974 and played college football at Washington State University in the Pacific-8 Conference. He was selected in the first round of the 1978 NFL draft (19th overall), the Cougars' first selection in the first round in 13 years.

== Coaching career ==
Greene began coaching football in 1994, at Vallivue High School in southwestern Idaho. He later coached at Fresno State University, Purdue University, and Washington State University.

== Personal life ==
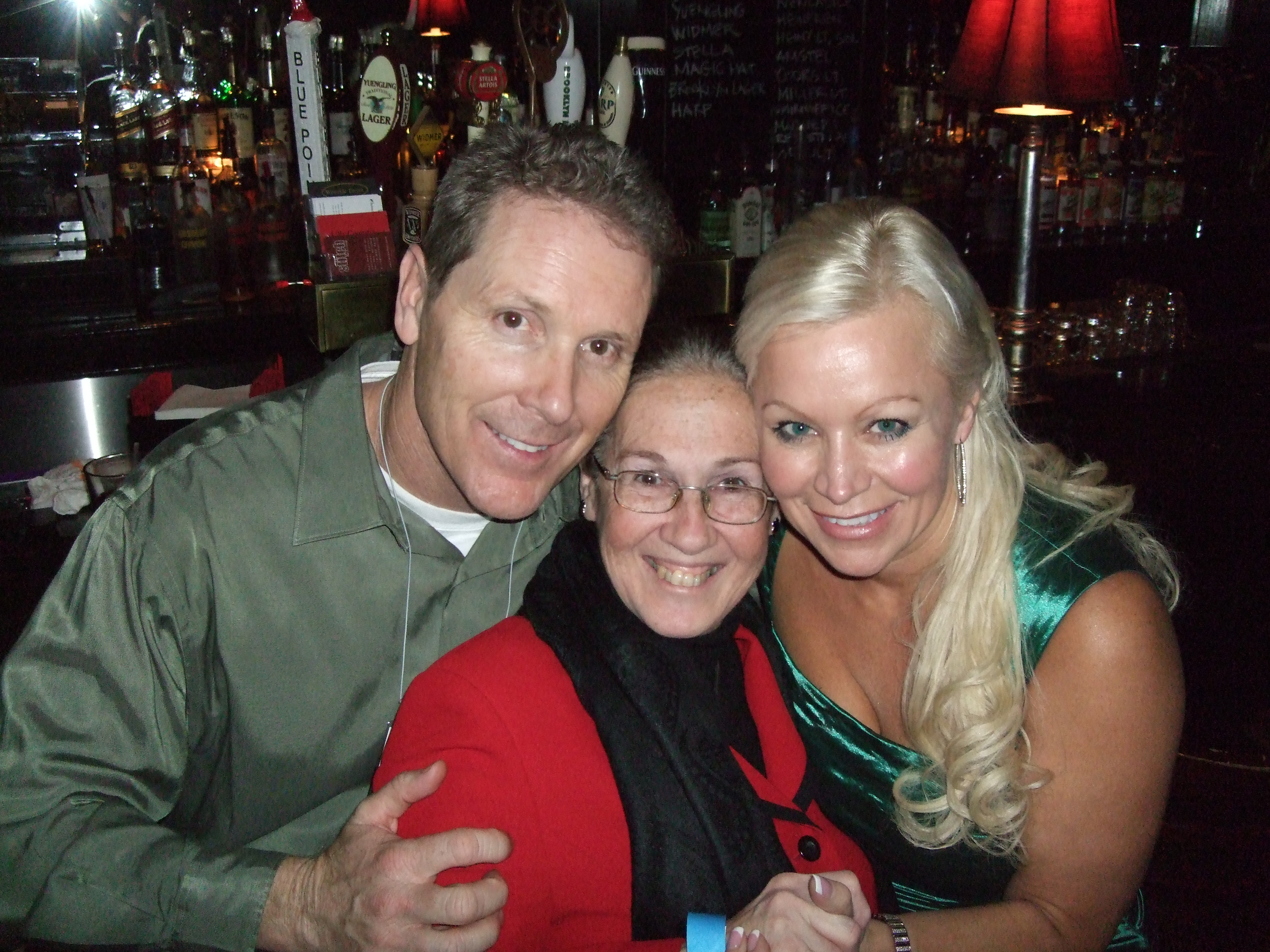
Greene and his wife at TARCon

Greene appeared in the 13th season of The Amazing Race with his wife, Tina Greene. The goal on the race was to try to mend their broken marriage. They finished the race in second place, but agreed to give their marriage another try.
