= Kyle Basler =

American football player (born 1982)

Profile
- Position: Punter

Personal information
- Born: December 27, 1982 (age 43); Olympia, Washington, U.S.
- Listed height: 6 ft 3 in (1.91 m)
- Listed weight: 238 lb (108 kg)

Career information
- High school: Elma (WA)
- College: Washington State

Career history
- 2006: Cleveland Browns
- 2007: Frankfurt Galaxy

Kyle Basler (born December 27, 1982) is an American former football punter. He was signed by the Cleveland Browns as an undrafted free agent out of Washington State.

== Early life ==
Basler attended Elma High School and helped his team to the state Championship in his freshman year.

== College career ==
Basler attended Washington State. He played in 48 games and his 255 career punts for 10,794 yards was a school record. He was a sports management major.

== Professional career ==
Basler was selected by the Cleveland Browns as an undrafted free agent. However, he was cut at the end of training camp. He was signed to the Browns' active roster following the end of the 2006 season and was allocated to NFL Europa where he played for the Frankfurt Galaxy.
