= St. John/Endicott High School =

High school in Washington, United States

Location
- 301 West Nob Hill Street; St. John, (Whitman County), Washington 99171; United States

Information
- Type: Public high school
- Principal: Tina Strong
- Staff: 6.87 (FTE)
- Enrollment: 63 (2022-23)
- Student to teacher ratio: 9.17
- Colors: Red and gold
- Nickname: Eagles
- Website: www.sjeschools.org

St. John/Endicott High School is a US public school located in St. John, Washington. The school's mascot is the eagle and the school's colors are red and gold.

== Location ==
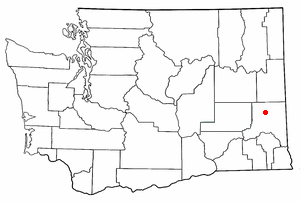
Location of St. John, Washington

St. John is located at 47°5′25″N 117°34′56″W (47.090403, -117.582085).

== Sports and activities ==
St. John High School has a specialism in sports, including the boys' basketball team which has gone to the state championship 11 times and has been the state champions 6 times. The football team at the high school received its first state championship trophy in the 1B Division in December 2006. The Eagles won 7 successive state championships (1942, 1961, 1963, 1968, 1969, 1978 and 1980).

Not only do they excel in basketball, they also won the 1B baseball championship in 2011. The team rallied behind the idea of everyone getting mohawks for the championship game. The Eagles Girls Cross Country team has made it to state two consecutive times (2012-2013). The girls placed second in the 2012 championships and third in the 2013 championships. The Girls Cross Country team has also won the State Academic Award three consecutive seasons (2011 to 2013). The girls pulled out a very impressive GPA of 3.985.
