= Bob Picard =

American football player (born 1949)

No. 82, 44
- Position: Wide receiver

Personal information
- Born: November 24, 1949 (age 76); Omak, Washington, U.S.
- Listed height: 6 ft 1 in (1.85 m)
- Listed weight: 195 lb (88 kg)

Career information
- High school: Omak
- College: Eastern Washington (1968–1972)
- NFL draft: 1973: 6th round, 132nd overall pick

Career history
- Philadelphia Eagles (1973–1976); Seattle Seahawks (1976)*; Philadelphia Eagles (1976); Detroit Lions (1976)
- * Offseason or practice squad member only

Awards and highlights
- Eastern Washington Eagles No. 84 retired

Career NFL statistics
- Fumble recoveries: 2
- Stats at Pro Football Reference

Robert Picard (born November 24, 1949) is an American former professional football player who was a wide receiver for three years in the National Football League (NFL) with the Philadelphia Eagles, Seattle Seahawks and Detroit Lions. He played college football for the Eastern Washington Eagles.

== College career ==
Picard walked on to NAIA Eastern Washington State, which is now known as Eastern Washington. He played four years as a wide receiver, setting career records for catches (166), yards (2,373), and touchdowns (19). These marks stood for 22 years until they were broken in 1993. He had his number 84 jersey retired, making him one of only two players to have received this honor at Eastern Washington, the other being Michael Roos.

== Professional career ==
Picard was selected by the Philadelphia Eagles in the sixth round of the 1973 NFL draft. He spent three seasons with the Eagles, making his mark primarily on special teams. He was selected in the 1976 NFL expansion draft by the Seattle Seahawks, but he was cut in training camp. He then returned to the Philadelphia Eagles for four games before being traded mid-season to the Detroit Lions, where he would play the final eight games of his career.

Picard never caught a regular season pass in the NFL, but his play on special teams was renowned. One Philadelphia sportswriter once said of Picard that "Of all the Philadelphia Eagles, the easiest one to find in the locker room is Bobby Picard. He's the one covered with all the blood. Number 82 in your program, but No. 1 in the kamikaze ranks. The guy who looks like a walking transfusion."
