= North Omak, Washington =

North Omak
- CDP
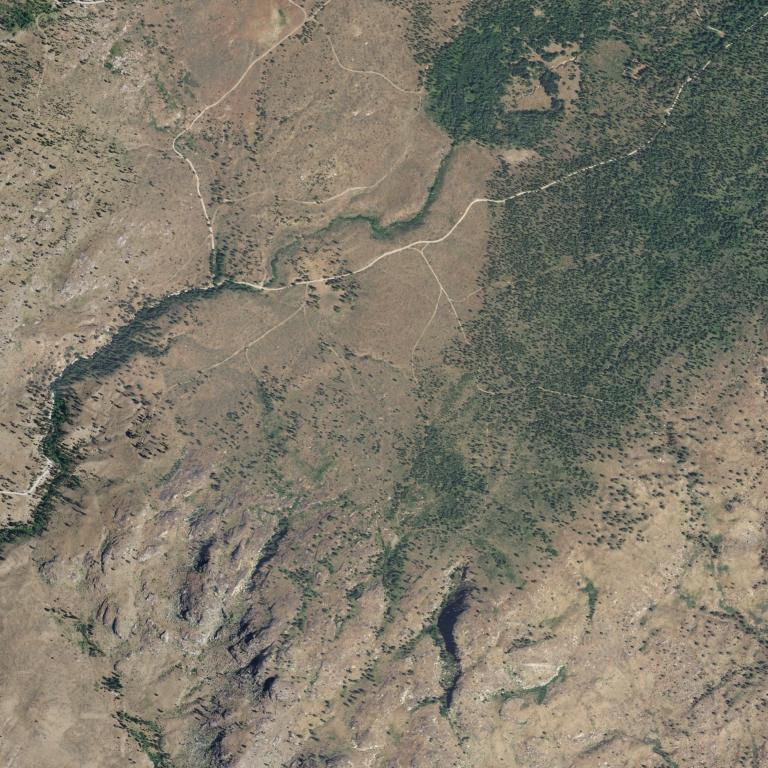
- Aerial view of North Omak

- Location of North Omak in Okanogan County and Washington

- Location in the United States
- Coordinates: 48°25′26″N 119°28′15″W
- Country: United States
- State: Washington
- County: Okanogan

Area
  - Total: 11.2 sq mi (29 km^{2})
  - Land: 11.2 sq mi (29 km^{2})
  - Water: 0.00 sq mi (0 km^{2})
- Elevation: 1,273 ft (388 m)

Population (2020)
  - Total: 651
  - Density: 58.1/sq mi (22.4/km^{2})
- Time zone: UTC-8 (PST)
  - Summer (DST): UTC-7 (PDT)
- ZIP codes: 98841
- Area code: 509
- FIPS code: 53-50007
- GNIS feature ID: 2408944

North Omak is a census-designated place (CDP) in Okanogan County, Washington, United States, north of Omak, Washington. The community is considered to be part of Greater Omak, and had a population of 651 at the 2020 census.

== Geography ==
According to the United States Census Bureau, the CDP has a total area of 11.2 square miles (29.0 km^{2}), all of it land.

== Demographics ==
Historical population
Census	Pop.	Note	%±
1990	515		—
2000	688		33.6%
2010	688		0.0%
2020	651		−5.4%
US Decennial Census; 2020 Census

As of the 2010 United States census, there were 688 people, 207 households, and 166 families residing in the CDP, with 61.4 people per square mile (23.7/km^{2}). There were 220 housing units at an average density of 19.6/sq mi (7.6/km^{2}). The racial makeup of the CDP was 13.52% White, 73.55% Native American, 8.28% from other races, and 4.65% from two or more races. Hispanic or Latino of any race were 14.68% of the population.

There were 207 households, out of which 53.6% had children under the age of 18 living with them, 34.3% were married couples living together, 30.4% had a female householder with no husband present, and 19.8% were non-families. 15.9% of all households were made up of individuals, and 2.4% had someone living alone who was 65 years of age or older. The average household size was 3.32 and the average family size was 3.51.

In the CDP, the population was spread out, with 39.4% under the age of 18, 9.7% from 18 to 24, 31.7% from 25 to 44, 15.7% from 45 to 64, and 3.5% who were 65 years of age or older. The median age was 25 years. For every 100 females, there were 98.3 males. For every 100 females age 18 and over, there were 94.0 males.

The median income for a household in the CDP was $25,500, and the median income for a family was $22,788. Males had a median income of $20,227 versus $23,688 for females. The per capita income for the CDP was $8,971. About 33.0% of families and 39.7% of the population were below the poverty line, including 44.4% of those under age 18 and none of those age 65 or over.

== Education ==
The area is served by the Omak School District.
