= Royal High School (Washington) =

Location
- 955 Ahlers Road; Royal City, Washington; United States
- Coordinates: 46°54′44″N 119°37′39″W

Information
- School district: Royal School District #160
- Teaching staff: 28.30 (FTE)
- Enrollment: 578 (2023–2024)
- Student to teacher ratio: 20.42
- Color
- Mascot: Knight
- Website: Royal H.S.

Royal High School is a public high school located in Royal City, Washington that serves 417 students in grades 9–12. 77% of the students are Hispanic, while 22% are white.

== History ==
In 2022, Royal High School finished construction of a new gymnasium, and released it to the public. They hosted a ribbon cutting ceremony at 7PM, January 19; officially marking the first day of their gymnasium.
