= Don McCormack =

American baseball player and coach (born 1955)

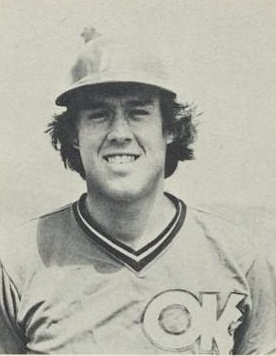
- Catcher
- Born: September 18, 1955 (age 70); Omak, Washington
- Batted: Right Threw: Right

MLB debut
- September 30, 1980, for the Philadelphia Phillies

Last MLB appearance
- October 4, 1981, for the Philadelphia Phillies

MLB statistics
- Batting average: .400
- Hits: 2
- Strikeouts: 1
- Stats at Baseball Reference

Teams
- Philadelphia Phillies (1980–1981)

Donald Ross McCormack (born September 18, 1955) is a former professional baseball player and coach. He was a fourth round draft pick (75th overall) in the 1974 Major League Baseball draft, by the Philadelphia Phillies out of Omak High School. On September 30, 1980, the 25-year-old McCormack made his major league debut with the Phillies. However, he would end up playing only 5 games total in the majors (in 1980 and 1981 with the Phillies), while spending most of nine years playing in the minor leagues in the Philadelphia and Detroit Tigers farm systems.

McCormack went on to manage the Reading Phillies (AA Eastern League) and is currently the bench coach of the Long Island Ducks (Atlantic League).

In September 2005, McCormack reached a milestone, posting his 800th win as a manager. The Ducks' manager position was taken over by Dave LaPoint, a former major league pitcher, on November 28, 2006. Bud Harrelson later took his place. As a result of this transition, McCormack became the team's bench coach.
