= Bickleton Elementary and High School =

Coordinates: 45°59′57″N 120°17′32″W

- Bickleton, Washington; United States

Information
- Grades: Pre-Kindergarten - Grade 12
- Enrollment: 91

Bickleton Elementary and High School is a pre-kindergarten through 12th grade learning establishment in Bickleton, Washington. It is a part of the Bickleton School District. Despite covering such a large number of grades, the enrollment is only 91 students, 58% of which are white, 31% of which are Spanish. The rest are Asian or unknown.
