= Eagle Harbor High School =

Location
- 9530 N.E. High School Road; Bainbridge Island, Kitsap, WA 98110; United States; 47°38′14″N 122°31′17″W

Information
- School type: Public Secondary
- Motto: libertas est fortitudo
- Established: 1996
- School district: Bainbridge Island School District
- CEEB code: 480096
- Principal: Tricia Corsetti
- Grades: 9-12
- Enrollment: 87 (2023-2024)
- Campus size: 37500 square meters
- Campus type: Unlimited Open
- Colors: Royal Blue, Silver & Green
- Mascot: Eagle
- Website: cos.bisd303.org/ehhs

Eagle Harbor High School is part of the Commodore Options School, which serves multiple alternative programs for the Bainbridge Island School District, including the Mosaic Home Education Partnership, Odyssey Multiage Program, and Eagle Harbor High School.

Eagle Harbor High School is an alternative high school in Bainbridge Island, Washington. The high school offers ninth through twelfth grade classes and independent studies. As of 2010, Eagle Harbor High School offers three Advanced Placement courses: AP U.S. History, AP Human Geography, and AP Environmental Science. Students may participate in any of the interscholastic sports programs offered on the adjacent Bainbridge High School campus, for both of the high schools run on the same schedule. Eagle Harbor students may also attend classes at the nearby Bainbridge High School.

Classes at Eagle Harbor High School typically have around 20 students on average in a class. There is also only 7 main teachers.

== Alternative Education ==
Eagle Harbor High School allows student to individualize their learning. As a student there you will decide not only if you want to learn but also what you will learn. Through the contract studies program the student will go learn about a subject, log how many hours they worked (the state requires 90 Hours per semester per class) and document what they learned. Students meet with their teacher/advisors weekly to share their learning and present the work each month.

Eagle Harbor is adjacent to Bainbridge High School. Student can take classes both at Eagle Harbor and Bainbridge High School. The Eagle Harbor classes have a high degree of project based learning and group projects.

On state standardized testing, Eagle Harbor students score at the high end of state high schools. Students have been admitted to a range of colleges from top tier schools and the armed forces to vocational training programs,
