= Bainbridge Island School District =

School district in Bainbridge Island, Washington

Bainbridge Island School District No. 303 (BISD) is a public school district in Kitsap County, Washington, United States. It serves the town and island of Bainbridge Island. As of October 2006, the district had an enrollment of 4,280 students.

== Schools ==
=== Elementary schools ===
- x̌alilc (pronounced "Haleets" or "Halilts") Elementary School (grades PK-4), renamed from Charles Wilkes Elementary in 2023 to honor the name of a local petroglyph, Haleets, predating Columbian contact
- Capt. Johnston Blakely Elementary School (grades PK-4)
- Ordway Elementary School (grades K-4)

=== Middle schools ===
- Sonoji Sakai Intermediate School (grades 5–6)
- Woodward Middle School (grades 7–8)

=== High schools ===
- Bainbridge High School (grades 9–12)

=== Alternative programs ===
BISD offers home-based and student-directed educational programming under the umbrella of the Commodore Options School:

- Mosaic Home Education Partnership (Grades K-8)
- Odyssey Multiage Program (Grades 1–8)
- Eagle Harbor High School (Grades 9–12)
