= Omak School District =

School district in Washington, United States

Location
- Omak, Washington Okanogan Country United States
- Coordinates: 48°24′7.02″N 119°32′29.76″W

District information
- Type: Public
- Motto: A Tradition of Excellence since 1912
- Grades: K–12
- Established: 1912
- Schools: 8
- Budget: $US18 million
- NCES District ID: 5306220

Students and staff
- Students: 2,540
- Student–teacher ratio: 19.65

Other information
- Website: www.omaksd.org

Omak School District, officially known as Omak School District 19, is a school district that serves Omak, Washington, a city in the Okanogan region of United States. It consists of three elementary schools, two middle schools and three high schools. The district was established in 1912. Its first high school, Omak High School, was built in 1919. More schools were constructed in September 1954, when land was leased in North Omak.

The district includes Omak, North Omak, Riverside, and Disautel.

Omak School District merged with Conconully School District in the 1960s; in 1964, a student count of four in Conconully prompted consideration of the merger. The district now educates 2,540 students. Omak School District covers an area of 496.8 square metres (5,348 sq ft) and has a population of 10,481, approximately 5,000 over Omak. There is also a high diversity rank for students in the district, having an index rank of 52.3 percent.

Bus transportation services and a family access program are among the services provided by the district. A virtual school was proposed for Omak in May 2009. In February 2010, Omak School District became the first district in Okanogan County and the third in Washington to open a virtual school. District superintendent Arthur Himmler died in March 2013, and there is ongoing discussion related to his replacement. The district ranks 240 of the 259 school districts in Washington, with Omak High School maintaining the highest scores and Washington Virtual Academy Omak High School garnering the lowest scores.

== History ==
Omak School District was established in 1912. Its first high school was built in 1919, following 150 out of 155 votes in favour of the development of a high school. That same month, there was a discussion to create a special $US10 million tax, so the school district could pay its debts to the Washington State Board of Education. Omak High School had an enrolment of 13 when it opened in 1919. Consideration of further schools in Omak began in September 1954, when land was leased in North Omak. In 1955, curriculum coordinator Carl Precht announced that the new elementary school, North Omak Elementary School, would move into the location of a business. The school was damaged by fire in 1988. That same year, the district purchased a larger bus to run the district's five bus routes. The district's highest budget was $US847,621 during the 1966–67 school season. Several people filed for school board director positions in Okanogan County by February 1952, including Dr. Fred Baines and Dr. Ralph Mundinger. The cost of education services in Omak during the 1955–56 school year was $US400,000. The Conconully School District merged with Omak on July 1, 1964, as a number of residents complained about the school system in the town of Conconully, which had four pupils that year. Residents voted in favor of bus transportation services beginning in 1966; similar services were established in neighboring districts around the same time.

In a July 1972 school board meeting, the district hired John Turner as superintendent. A district-wide teacher strike occurred in September 1977, though some risked being fined or jailed for violating a temporary retaining order, according to an Omak Education Association spokesman. Penalties over this issue came into effect later that month: Omak Education Association members were charged $US50 daily, while the association itself would need to pay $US2,500 until the strike ended. To end the strike, consensus needed to be achieved among the teachers; substitute staff were paid $US70 rather than the traditional $US40 during this time. The situation was resolved later that month and the teachers returned to their classrooms. Other schools across Washington also went on a strike at that time. That year, 78 teachers and 1,600 pupils served the district.

In March 2005, the local high school's facilities were expanded and upgraded. That year, Omak School District spent approximately $US10,000 in salary and insurance so that a teacher and theater technical director, David Baker, could submit his resignation; Baker was placed on paid administrative leave in October 2005 because of sexual concerns with a former student. The Office of the Superintendent of Public Instruction was notified about the situation. Members of the school administrative board accepted this resignation.

In February 2010, Omak School District became the first in Okanogan County and the third in Washington to establish a virtual school; the school had been proposed in May 2009. District leaders saw this process as a way to offer a number of additional services at their schools; 90 signed up for the beta test. They also noted they would pay owner Stride, Inc. about $1,700 per person who uses the service. Once this service was in place by 2011, the district grew from 1,400 students to about 2,500 students, who generally used the virtual school. Meanwhile, an energy-saving contract was implanted in 2010 with Schneider Electric, which would help reduce the district's energy costs by 15 percent; this would include fixing poor light quality and upgrading temperature control.

== Facilities ==
The Omak School District consists of eight schools. There are three elementary schools, two middle schools and three high schools. The three elementary schools are: North Omak Elementary School, which is home to 346 children from kindergarten to grade two, East Omak Elementary School, which 346 students from grades three to five; and Washington Virtual Academy Omak Elementary, a virtual school that educates 443 students from kindergarten to grade five. Omak Middle School and Washington Virtual Academy Omak Middle School serve as the district's middle schools; the former is home to 339 people from grades six to eight, while the latter contains 339 students and the same grade levels.

The district's high schools include Omak High School, Omak Alternative High School, and virtual school Washington Virtual Academy Omak High School. The first contains 435 students between grades 9 and 12, while the second is home to 48 people in the same grades and the third has 164 in these grades.

Omak offers a family access program, Skyward Family Access. It states that, consistent with federal law, they do not discriminate against anybody and have a drug-free environment. Omak School District's schools have a number of sport teams in the winter, spring and fall. The News Tribune gave their "All-Sports Title" to a sports team in Omak in the 1989–90, 1994–95, 1998–99, 1999–2000 and 2000–01 school years. Bus transportation services are available to the schools. In February 2013, the state auditor criticized the district's virtual schools, citing financial concerns and error rates.

== Demographics ==
The Omak School District ranks 240 of the 259 school districts in Washington. It consists of five buildings: North Omak Elementary School, East Omak Elementary School, Omak Middle School, Omak High School and Omak Alternative High School. The district's virtual schools do not contain buildings, as they are online school courses, and the students in question are not compelled to join the Omak School District; however, every public resident is permitted to register under the district if they wish. Omak High School maintains the highest score for the two schools tested in the district, with a 12.9 rank for college readiness, a 1.9 rank for math lessons and 3.1 reading rank all near the Washington average; scores for the Washington Virtual Academy Omak High School were below the state average, with a math rank of 0.8 and 1.5. Based on these statistics, Omak High School received a bronze model in U.S. News & World Report's "Best High School" rankings for the United States as a whole. A total of 2,540 students attend public schools in this district; over 1,110 of these students attend elementary schools, while over 700 are based at its middle schools and over 640 study at high schools within the district. 342 people have the Individualized Education Program disability and 88 are English-language learners.

There is a 19.65 student-teacher ratio, and the district handles $US18 million to help maintain its schools. The current superintendent is Michael Porter, who was hired in 2020. The district covers an area of 496.8 square metres (5,348 sq ft), with a population of 10,481 within the district at the 2010 United States census, which is approximately 5,000 ahead of Omak's population. There is a population of 21.2 per square mile and a 52.3 percent diversity index. It ranks first of the nine school districts in Okanogan County for diversity. Omak School District's head office used by the superintendent is located on 619 West Bartlett Avenue in Omak, located off Washington State Route 215.

== See also ==
- List of school districts in Washington (state)
