= Tenino School District =

School district in Washington, United States

Tenino School District 402

Address
- 301 Old Highway 99 SE; Tenino, WA 98589 Thurston County, Washington Tenino; United States

District information
- Grades: PK–12
- Superintendent: Clint Endicott (2021-Present)
- Enrollment: 1,284 (2025)

Tenino School District 402 (TSD), is a public school district in Thurston County, Washington, United States, which serves the entire City of Tenino and the majority of the Town of Bucoda.

In the 2025-26 school year, Tenino School District had a student enrollment of 1,284.

== Location ==
Tenino School District 402 covers 108 square miles (279.7 km^{2}) of land in southern Thurston County, including all of the City of Tenino.

== History ==
=== Establishment ===
On June 2, 1942, voters approved the consolidation of Plum Station School District No. 15, Colvin School District No. 29, Cat-Tail School District No. 36, Skookumchuck School District No. 323, and Tenino School District No. 329 at a special election, forming Tenino School District No. 402 on July 1, 1942. All five component districts involved in the consolidation were part of the Tenino Union High School District No. 206, which allowed students outside of District No. 329 to attend high school in Tenino. After the consolidation, Union High School District No. 206 was dissolved. Previous consolidations that formed the component districts were as follows:

- On July 15, 1921, voters approved the consolidation of Tenino School District No. 44 and Offut School District No. 78 at a special election, forming Tenino School District No. 311.
- On June 7, 1932, voters approved the consolidation of Violet Prairie School District No. 68 and Tenino School District No. 311 at a special election, forming Tenino School District No. 322 on July 1, 1932.
  - On November 20, 1905, voters approved the consolidation of Grand Valley School District No. 30 and Case School District No. 54 at a special election, forming Violet Prairie School District No. 68.
- On March 1, 1941, voters approved the consolidation of Rocky Prairie School District No. 17 and Tenino School District No. 322 at a special election, forming Tenino School District No. 329 on July 1, 1941.

In 1973, voters within the Town of Bucoda voted to transfer the town from Centralia School District No. 401 into Tenino School District No. 402, citing more local access to area schools following the closure of the Bucoda school in 1971.

== Schools ==
Elementary Schools
Name	Grade Levels	Established	Enrollment (2025-26)	Mascot
Parkside	PK–2	1930	304	Penguins
Tenino	3-5	1891	279	Tigers

Middle Schools
Name	Grade Levels	Established	Enrollment (2025-26)	Mascot
Tenino	6-8	-	287	Knights

High Schools
Name	Grade Levels	Established	Enrollment (2025-26)	Mascot	WIAA Classification
Tenino	9-12	1908	414	Beavers	1A
