= Omak High School =

Coordinates: 48°24′36″N 119°32′4″W

Location
- 20 S Cedar St; Omak, Okanogan County, Washington 98841; United States

Information
- Type: Public
- Opened: 1912
- School district: Omak School District
- Principal: David Kirk
- Teaching staff: 27.50 (FTE)
- Grades: 9-12
- Enrollment: 436 (2023-2024)
- Student to teacher ratio: 15.85
- Colors: Red and black
- Mascot: Pioneer
- Rival: Okanogan High School
- Website: School webpage

Omak High School is a public high school situated in Omak, Washington, a city in the Okanogan Country region of North America. It provides educational service for children in grades 9 to 12, and is part of the Omak School District.

== Alumni ==
- Ken Greene - NFL safety (class of 1974)
- Don McCormack - MLB catcher for Philadelphia Phillies (class of 1974)
- Bob Picard - NFL Wide Receiver (class of 1967)
- Jason Romine - MLB Relief Pitcher for Colorado Rockies (class of 1994)
- Torrence (Tory) Saxe - USAF Major General for Alaska National Guard (class of 1988)
