= Spokane Valley High School =

Location
- 2011 North Hutchinson; Spokane Valley, Washington 99212; United States
- Coordinates: 47°40′32″N 117°17′04″W

Information
- Type: Public high school
- Established: 1982
- School district: West Valley School District
- NCES School ID: 530969003769
- Principal: Eric Jurasin
- Teaching staff: 12.2 (on an FTE basis)
- Grades: 9–12
- Enrollment: 235 (2020-21)
- Student to teacher ratio: 19
- Colors: Burgundy & Gray
- Nickname: Phoenixes
- Website: svhs.wvsd.org

Spokane Valley High School (SVHS or SVH) in Spokane Valley, Washington, USA, is part of the West Valley School District.

== In popular culture ==
The school has been featured on PBS once in 2010 and in 2013 on the Frontline episode "Education Under Arrest". Spokane Valley High School opened its doors in 1982.
