= Jefferson Community School =

Coordinates: 48°06′57″N 122°45′17″W

Location
- 280 Quincy St., Suite I Port Townsend, Washington; United States

Information
- Type: Private school
- Established: 2005
- Head of school: Craig Frick
- Staff: 3
- Faculty: 6
- Grades: 7–12
- Accreditation: NWAIS (Northwest Association of Independent Schools) AdvancEd Accreditation
- Affiliation: Independent

Jefferson Community School is a non-profit independent school located in downtown Port Townsend, Washington. Opened in 2005, it is one of the only four independent educational institutions in Jefferson County. Jefferson Community School serves students from grades 6 to 12, and had a total enrollment of 16 students for the 2018–2019 school year.
