= Sunnyside Christian High School =

High school in Washington, United States

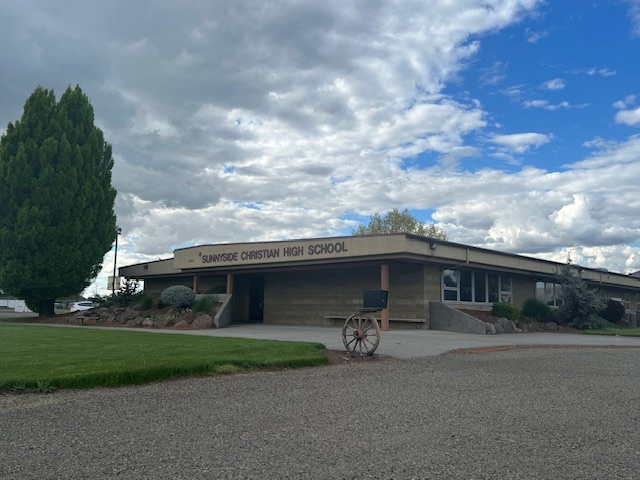
Sunnyside Christian as it stands in 2024

Sunnyside Christian High School is a private Christian-centered high school located in Sunnyside, Washington. It is one of two high schools in the town. The school aims to promote a Christ-centred learning environment as it prepares students for their futures.

== History ==
Planning for Sunnyside Christian High School began in 1942, leading to the school's first class in 1947. The school expanded its middle school education in 1970 and began offering high school education in 1984. Enrollment continued to grow, and the school now provides instruction from Pre-Kindergarten through 12th grade.

Sunnyside Christian High School

Location
- 1820 Sheller Road, Sunnyside, Washington 98944; United States
- 46°19′55″N 119°59′42″W

Information
- Type: Private, Non-profit
- Motto: Providing a Christ-centered, Bible-based, quality education for distinctively Christian living.
- Established: 1947
- School district: Sunnyside
- Superintendent: Brad Van Beek
- Principal: Dean Wagenaar
- Grades: Preschool-12th grade
- Colors: Maroon and Gold
- Mascot: Knights
- Website: https://www.sunnysidechristianschool.org/

== Demographics ==
Sunnyside Christian is located on the northeast side of Sunnyside, Washington. The town has an estimated population of 16,208, and Sunnyside Christian serves about 260 students across all grades, with 229 enrolled in the high school. With the growing population, Sunnyside Christian operates two campuses: Sunnyside Christian School, which serves preschool through 8th grade, and Sunnyside Christian High School, which serves 9th through 12th grade.

In the 2022 school year, an estimated 20% of the student enrollment identified as Asian (2%), Black (1%), or Hispanic (18%).

This school is a private, non-profit Christian institution with an annual tuition fee of approximately $7,650 per child for grades 9 through 12. Sunnyside Christian offers financial assistance through donations from alumni, annual fundraising events, and Federal Student Aid for families.

Accreditation Memberships: Christian Schools International and Cognia.

== Culture ==
Sunnyside Christian offers extracurricular activities, traditions, and clubs for students outside of regular school hours.

=== Extracurricular activities ===
Sports
Football	Volleyball	Basketball	Baseball	Fastpitch Softball
Offered to 8th-12th grade students	Offered to junior and high school female athletes	Offered through AAU from 2nd-8th grade and to junior and high school students	Offered to junior and high school students	Offered to junior and high school students

*Sunnyside Christian also allows students to participate in sports not offered by the school through their local home district.

Clubs
Cheer	Drama	Pep Band	Student Council	Game Club	FFA
Offered to high school students	Offered to high school students	Offered to 5th-12th grade students and parents	Offered to junior and high school students	Offered to high school students	Offered to high school students

=== Fine arts ===
Aside from clubs and athletics, Sunnyside Christian offers music education to students from preschool through 4th grade. This transitions to choir for junior and high school students interested in music. Photography classes are also available for students with an interest in the subject.

=== Traditions ===
Traditions are an integral part of both the school and the community. Some of these include pep assemblies where students from K-12 support their peers in sports, competitive chocolate sales where elementary and junior high students fundraise for the school, and track and field day.

"See You at the Pole" is another religious tradition at the school where students gather for worship. The Union Gospel Mission is a long-standing tradition involving a high school and community food drive for the homeless shelter, held every November.

=== Curriculum ===
Sunnyside Christian aims to prepare students for the world beyond graduation by providing lessons from their curriculum and offering ACT and SAT preparation.

Central Washington University has partnered with high schools around the state through a program known as College in the Classroom. This program allows students to build a college transcript while simultaneously fulfilling high school graduation requirements.

== Highlights ==
Former Sunnyside Christian basketball player Lance Den Boer went on to play at Central Washington University. He was inducted into Central Washington's Hall of Fame in 2021 for his performances during the 2005-2007 seasons as a Wildcat.

Sunnyside Christian's volleyball team placed in the top 8 of the state playoffs in the 1B division from 2011 to 2019.

The 2022 boys' basketball team earned 2nd place at the state playoffs in the 1B division, while the 2024 women's basketball team earned 6th place in the same division.

== See also ==
- Federal Student Aid
