= Elma, Washington =

- City
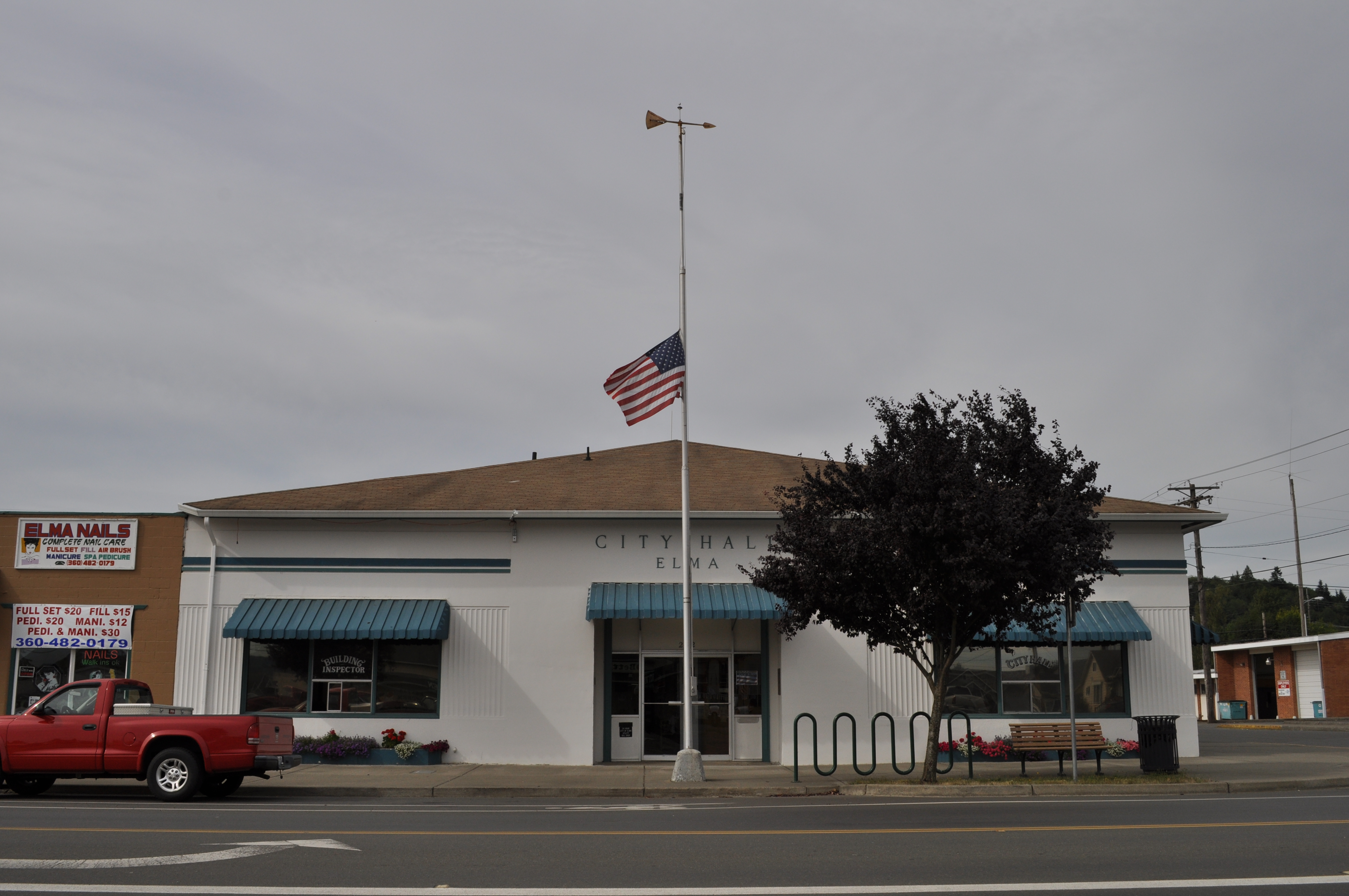
- City hall

- Location of Elma, Washington
- Coordinates: 47°00′08″N 123°24′56″W
- Country: United States
- State: Washington
- County: Grays Harbor
- Settled: 1853
- Incorporated: March 22, 1888

Government
  - Mayor: Josh Collette

Area
  - Total: 2.58 sq mi (6.69 km^{2})
  - Land: 2.55 sq mi (6.60 km^{2})
  - Water: 0.031 sq mi (0.08 km^{2})
- Elevation: 59 ft (18 m)

Population (2020)
  - Total: 3,438
  - Estimate (2022): 3,469
  - Density: 1,314/sq mi (507.4/km^{2})
- Time zone: UTC-8 (Pacific (PST))
  - Summer (DST): UTC-7 (PDT)
- ZIP Code: 98541
- Area code(s): 360, 564
- FIPS code: 53-21450
- GNIS feature ID: 2410431
- Website: www.cityofelma.com

Elma is a city in Grays Harbor County, Washington, United States. The population was 3,438 at the 2020 census.

== History ==
First settled in 1853 by D.F. Byles, Elma was later named for Union soldier Elmer Brown. The city of Elma was incorporated on March 22, 1888.

== Geography ==
According to the United States Census Bureau, the city has a total area of 1.92 square miles (4.97 km^{2}), of which, 1.89 square miles (4.90 km^{2}) is land and 0.03 square miles (0.08 km^{2}) is water.

=== Climate ===
According to the Köppen Climate Classification system, Elma has a warm-summer Mediterranean climate, abbreviated "Csb" on climate maps. Summers are warm and dry, while winters are cool and very wet. Some form of precipitation occurs on half of all days on average.

Climate data for Elma, Washington, 1991–2020 normals, extremes 1940–present
Month	Jan	Feb	Mar	Apr	May	Jun	Jul	Aug	Sep	Oct	Nov	Dec	Year
Record high °F (°C)	65 (18)	73 (23)	80 (27)	91 (33)	99 (37)	110 (43)	105 (41)	103 (39)	100 (38)	91 (33)	74 (23)	65 (18)	110 (43)
Mean maximum °F (°C)	57.4 (14.1)	61.8 (16.6)	69.7 (20.9)	77.3 (25.2)	85.4 (29.7)	89.5 (31.9)	94.3 (34.6)	94.3 (34.6)	88.7 (31.5)	77.1 (25.1)	62.4 (16.9)	56.3 (13.5)	97.8 (36.6)
Mean daily maximum °F (°C)	48.6 (9.2)	51.9 (11.1)	56.4 (13.6)	61.8 (16.6)	68.3 (20.2)	72.4 (22.4)	78.4 (25.8)	79.5 (26.4)	75.1 (23.9)	63.7 (17.6)	53.0 (11.7)	47.4 (8.6)	63.0 (17.3)
Daily mean °F (°C)	41.6 (5.3)	42.9 (6.1)	46.3 (7.9)	50.4 (10.2)	56.3 (13.5)	60.3 (15.7)	65.1 (18.4)	65.5 (18.6)	61.4 (16.3)	52.6 (11.4)	44.7 (7.1)	40.6 (4.8)	52.3 (11.3)
Mean daily minimum °F (°C)	34.6 (1.4)	33.9 (1.1)	36.2 (2.3)	39.1 (3.9)	44.3 (6.8)	48.3 (9.1)	51.7 (10.9)	51.6 (10.9)	47.7 (8.7)	41.4 (5.2)	36.5 (2.5)	33.8 (1.0)	41.6 (5.3)
Mean minimum °F (°C)	21.3 (−5.9)	21.5 (−5.8)	24.9 (−3.9)	27.7 (−2.4)	31.9 (−0.1)	37.9 (3.3)	41.5 (5.3)	41.7 (5.4)	35.7 (2.1)	27.6 (−2.4)	22.7 (−5.2)	20.7 (−6.3)	15.7 (−9.1)
Record low °F (°C)	0 (−18)	4 (−16)	15 (−9)	22 (−6)	25 (−4)	31 (−1)	37 (3)	33 (1)	28 (−2)	15 (−9)	4 (−16)	2 (−17)	0 (−18)
Average precipitation inches (mm)	11.13 (283)	7.04 (179)	8.16 (207)	5.36 (136)	3.29 (84)	2.18 (55)	0.79 (20)	1.43 (36)	2.67 (68)	7.23 (184)	11.39 (289)	11.37 (289)	72.04 (1,830)
Average snowfall inches (cm)	0.9 (2.3)	0.5 (1.3)	0.1 (0.25)	0.0 (0.0)	0.0 (0.0)	0.0 (0.0)	0.0 (0.0)	0.0 (0.0)	0.0 (0.0)	0.0 (0.0)	0.2 (0.51)	0.0 (0.0)	1.7 (4.36)
Average precipitation days (≥ 0.01 in)	22.7	19.1	21.6	19.7	13.7	11.3	5.2	7.3	10.4	18.6	23.3	23.3	196.2
Average snowy days (≥ 0.1 in)	0.5	0.1	0.1	0.0	0.0	0.0	0.0	0.0	0.0	0.0	0.2	0.0	0.9
Source 1: NOAA
Source 2: National Weather Service

== Demographics ==
Historical population
Census	Pop.	Note	%±
1890	345		—
1900	894		159.1%
1910	1,532		71.4%
1920	1,253		−18.2%
1930	1,545		23.3%
1940	1,370		−11.3%
1950	1,543		12.6%
1960	1,811		17.4%
1970	2,227		23.0%
1980	2,720		22.1%
1990	3,011		10.7%
2000	3,049		1.3%
2010	3,107		1.9%
2020	3,438		10.7%
2022 (est.)	3,469		0.9%
U.S. Decennial Census; 2020 Census

=== 2020 census ===
As of the 2020 census, Elma had a population of 3,438, and the median age was 37.1 years. 24.3% of residents were under the age of 18, and 16.2% were 65 years of age or older. For every 100 females there were 97.5 males, and for every 100 females age 18 and over there were 94.2 males age 18 and over.

94.1% of residents lived in urban areas, while 5.9% lived in rural areas.

There were 1,304 households in Elma, of which 31.8% had children under the age of 18 living in them. Of all households, 41.2% were married-couple households, 19.6% were households with a male householder and no spouse or partner present, and 29.0% were households with a female householder and no spouse or partner present. About 29.9% of all households were made up of individuals and 13.8% had someone living alone who was 65 years of age or older.

There were 1,381 housing units, of which 5.6% were vacant. The homeowner vacancy rate was 1.3% and the rental vacancy rate was 4.0%.

Racial composition as of the 2020 census
Race	Number	Percent
White	2,758	80.2%
Black or African American	35	1.0%
American Indian and Alaska Native	93	2.7%
Asian	59	1.7%
Native Hawaiian and Other Pacific Islander	7	0.2%
Some other race	216	6.3%
Two or more races	270	7.9%
Hispanic or Latino (of any race)	380	11.1%

=== 2010 census ===
As of the 2010 census, there were 3,107 people, 1,209 households, and 788 families living in the city. The population density was 1,643.9 inhabitants per square mile (634.7/km^{2}). There were 1,307 housing units at an average density of 691.5 per square mile (267.0/km^{2}). The racial makeup of the city was 85.8% White, 1.0% African American, 2.6% Native American, 2.1% Asian, 0.4% Pacific Islander, 3.2% from other races, and 4.9% from two or more races. Hispanic or Latino people of any race were 6.6% of the population.

There were 1,209 households, of which 34.7% had children under the age of 18 living with them, 42.8% were married couples living together, 16.2% had a female householder with no husband present, 6.2% had a male householder with no wife present, and 34.8% were non-families. 27.7% of all households were made up of individuals, and 11.7% had someone living alone who was 65 years of age or older. The average household size was 2.53 and the average family size was 3.02.

The median age in the city was 36.1 years. 25.9% of residents were under the age of 18; 9.2% were between the ages of 18 and 24; 25.4% were from 25 to 44; 26.6% were from 45 to 64; and 12.9% were 65 years of age or older. The gender makeup of the city was 49.1% male and 50.9% female.

=== 2000 census ===
As of the 2000 census, there were 3,049 people, 1,195 households, and 764 families living in the city. The population density was 1,812.6 people per square mile (700.7/km^{2}). There were 1,330 housing units at an average density of 790.7 per square mile (305.7/km^{2}). The racial makeup of the city was 90.98% White, 0.59% African American, 1.31% Native American, 1.28% Asian, 0.26% Pacific Islander, 1.64% from other races, and 3.94% from two or more races. Hispanic or Latino people of any race were 3.64% of the population.

There were 1,195 households, out of which 35.5% had children under the age of 18 living with them, 44.9% were married couples living together, 13.6% had a female householder with no husband present, and 36.0% were non-families. 27.5% of all households were made up of individuals, and 12.3% had someone living alone who was 65 years of age or older. The average household size was 2.51 and the average family size was 3.06.

In the city, the population was spread out, with 29.2% under the age of 18, 9.1% from 18 to 24, 28.1% from 25 to 44, 19.3% from 45 to 64, and 14.4% who were 65 years of age or older. The median age was 34 years. For every 100 females, there were 97.2 males. For every 100 females age 18 and over, there were 92.2 males.

The median income for a household in the city was $32,031, and the median income for a family was $36,638. Males had a median income of $38,929 versus $23,125 for females. The per capita income for the city was $13,629. About 13.9% of families and 19.4% of the population were below the poverty line, including 22.5% of those under age 18 and 12.7% of those age 65 or over.

== Education ==
The Elma School District, which covers all of Elma, has four schools. Elma Elementary School serves children in an Early Childhood Program, as well as kindergarten through 5th grade. Elma Middle School consists of 6th grade through 8th grade students; Elma High School houses 9th through 12th grade, and the East Grays Harbor High School provides alternative education. The mascot for Elma High School and Middle School is an eagle. Their colors are blue and white. The mascot for East Grays Harbor High School is a gryphon. Their colors are black and turquoise.

Elma High School participates in the Running Start program, through which students in grades 11 and 12 may take college level classes for college credit via Grays Harbor College in Aberdeen, and Washington State University.

Early childhood development programs include several daycares, a co-op preschool, and a Head Start facility.

== Infrastructure ==
The Elma Municipal Airport (WN65) is located south of the downtown district across U.S. Route 12 (US 12). The airfield contains one runway. In the 1970s, the airport was the site of a fixed-base flight operation, but has since been privately owned.

== Notable people ==
- Kyle Basler, football player for various teams
- Jamie Craighead, basketball player for various teams
- Rod Derline, basketball player for various teams
- Lloyd Jones, Alaskan state senator
- Bud Ward, golfer
