= West Valley School District (Spokane, Washington) =

School district in Washington (state)

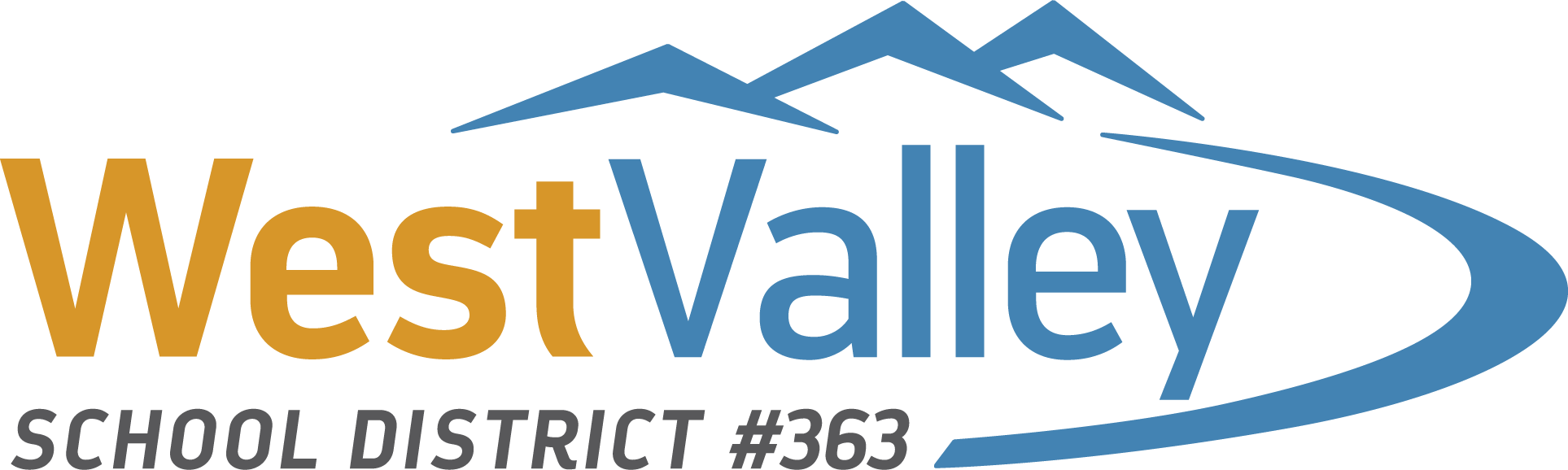

Address
- 2805 North Argonne Road Spokane, Washington, 99212; United States
- Coordinates: 47°40′57″N 117°17′00″W

District information
- Type: Public
- Grades: Pre-K through 12
- Established: 1910; 116 years ago
- Superintendent: Kyle Rydell
- Schools: 12
- NCES District ID: 5309690

Students and staff
- Students: 3,862 (2017-2018)
- Teachers: 216.02 (on an FTE basis)
- Student–teacher ratio: 17.88
- Colors: Yellow; Blue

Other information
- Website: wvsd.org

West Valley School District (WVSD) is located in the city of Spokane Valley, Washington, United States. The district has five elementary schools, two middle schools, and three high schools, two of which are non-traditional high schools. The grade configurations are K-5 in the elementary, 6–8 in the middle schools, and 9–12 in the high schools.

== History ==
The West Valley School District was established in 1910 when several smaller districts were combined to form one.

== Schools ==
West Valley School District has total of 12 schools.

=== High schools ===
School	Enrollment
Dishman Hills High School	355
Spokane Valley High School	250
West Valley High School	850

=== Middle schools ===
School	Enrollment
Centennial Middle School	473
West Valley City School	172

=== Elementary schools ===
School	Enrollment
Ness Elementary School	335
Orchard Center Elementary	310
Pasadena Park Elementary	400
Seth Woodard Elementary	323
Millwood Kindergarten Center	200

=== Special programs ===
School	Enrollment
West Valley Outdoor Learning Center	N/A
West Valley Early Learning Center	111
