= Elma High School =

Coordinates: 47°00′11″N 123°24′49″W

Location
- 1011 West Main; Elma, Washington 98541

Information
- Type: Public
- School district: Elma School District
- Principal: Rich Rasanen
- Staff: 26.06 (FTE)
- Grades: 9–12
- Student to teacher ratio: 19.61
- Colors: White and blue
- Mascot: Eagle
- Website: Elma H.S.

Elma High School is a public secondary institution located in Elma, Washington located about 30 miles west of Olympia; the capital city of Washington. Elma High School serves the rural communities of McCleary, Elma and Satsop. Elma is located between Olympia and Aberdeen allowing a wider choice of colleges to attend to for Running Start.

The school serves grades 9 to 12 and enrolls around 735 students, with around 170 in the senior graduating class. The school mascot is the Eagle.

== Television station ==
Eagles TV, on Comcast channel 26 serving Grays Harbor County, is provided as a public service by the Video Productions and TV Broadcasting students of Elma High School. Programming is provided 24 hours a day, seven days week, 365 days a year using computer automation.

Each morning students produce a television news show known as "Eagles Live". The program runs about 5 to 7 minutes and is aired during the beginning of 2nd period.

== Cheerleader controversy ==
In September 2003, Elma High School made news when the administration banned cheerleaders' short skirts in classrooms or hallways. Some parents argued that the new rule devalues the work the girls put into practicing and maintaining their grades. The school argued that the dress code was being applied equally and that uniforms were in clear violation of the dress code.

== Notable alumni ==
- Robert Sund, poet.
