= Bainbridge High School (Washington) =

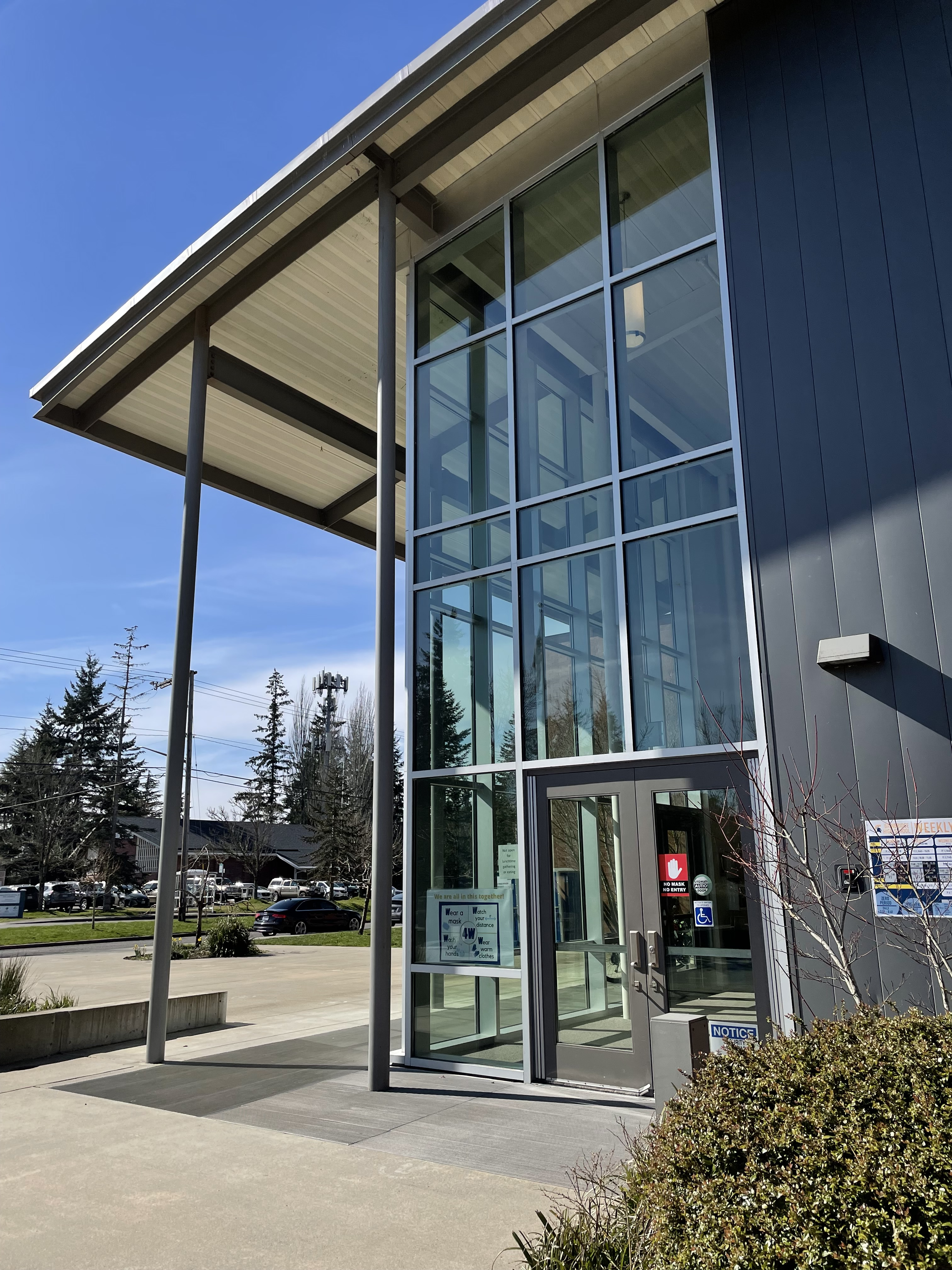
- The school exterior in March 2022

Location
- 9330 NE High School Rd; Bainbridge Island, Washington 98110-2111; United States; 47°38′11″N 122°31′27″W

Information
- Type: Public comprehensive high school
- School district: Bainbridge Island School District
- Superintendent: Amii Thompson
- CEEB code: 481580
- NCES School ID: 530033000043
- Principal: Dan Novick
- Teaching staff: 56.02 (FTE) (2023–2024)
- Grades: 9–12
- Gender: Co-educational
- Enrollment: 1,181 (2023–2024)
- Student to teacher ratio: 21.08 (2023–2024)
- Colors: Navy; Gold
- Athletics conference: Olympic League
- Mascot: The Spartan
- Newspaper: Spartan News (inactive)
- Website: bhs.bisd303.org

Bainbridge High School (BHS) is the sole comprehensive high school within the Bainbridge Island School District, serving students in grades 9–12 on Bainbridge Island, Washington. The principal is Dan Novick, with associate principals Joe Power and Amalia Gonzalez-Khan.

== Courses ==
Many elective courses offer opportunities outside of the normal high school course range. The school offers Advanced Placement courses.

== Athletics ==
Bainbridge High School athletes are known as the Spartans.

The Bainbridge High School girls lacrosse team from 1991 to 2009 was in sixteen championship games, winning eleven, including seven consecutive wins from 1994 to 2000 and its most recent win in 2007.

- Basketball
- Baseball
- Cheerleading
- Cross country
- Diving
- Football
- Golf
- Marching band
- Soccer
- Softball
- Swimming
- Tennis
- Track and field
- Volleyball
- Wrestling

In addition, the following club sports are available to BHS students:

- Crew
- Cycling
- Lacrosse
- Sailing
- Ultimate Frisbee
- Water polo

=== Championships ===
- The 2006-2007 Bainbridge High School boys varsity basketball team won the metro league regular season title, was the KingCo district tournament champion, and placed second in the state 3A tournament, placing six players on post-season all-league teams.
- The Bainbridge High School girls lacrosse team from 1991 to 2009 was in sixteen championship games, winning eleven, including seven consecutive wins from 1994 to 2000 and its most recent win in 2007.
- In 2009, Varsity Baseball 3A won the state championship at Safeco Field.
- The Varsity Fastpitch team won the 2009 Washington 3A State Championship, beating Holy Names Academy 6-2. The team was ranked 2nd in the state in 2010.
- In 2009, the girls 1600 meter relay team set the all-time West Sound record of 3:57.88 while finishing third in the 3A WIAA State Track & Field Championships. They finished first in the same event in 2004 and second in 2005 and 2008.
- In 2010, the marching band took 3rd place in state for parade and 1st place for music.
- The Bainbridge High School boys soccer team won the 2011 3A Metro division 1-0 over Lakeside.
- The Bainbridge High School boys soccer team placed 2nd in the 2011 Washington State 3A state playoffs falling 3-0 to Camas (who moved into the 4A division the following season).
- The Bainbridge High School girls lacrosse team won the 2011 Washington State Division 1 lacrosse championship, beating Lakeside School 16-8.
- The Bainbridge High School boys soccer team won the 2012 Washington State 3A state playoffs, defeating Mercer Island 3-2.
- The Bainbridge High School girls Junior Varsity soccer team won the 2012 Metro League.
- The Bainbridge High School girls lacrosse team won the 2012 Washington State Division 1 lacrosse championship.
- The Bainbridge High School boys soccer team placed 3rd in the 2013 Washington State 3A state playoffs, defeating Hanford 3-2 in the 3rd-4th place game.
- The 2013 Boys Crew took 2nd place in the Lightweight 4 event at the Junior Nationals in Oak Ridge, Tennessee.
- The Bainbridge High School wrestling team won the 2013 3A Metro division tournament.
- The 2014-2015 Boys Golf team won the 3A State Championship, with Sam Warkentin winning the individual title.
- The 2016-2017 Boys Swim took 1st place in the Metro League, 2nd place at Districts, and 1st at the state championship.
- 2016-2017 Boys Swimming 3A State Champions
- 2017-2018 Boys Swimming 3A State Champions
- 2018-2019 Boys Swimming 3A State Champions
- 2021-2022 Boys Water Polo State Champions
- 2021-2022 Girls Water Polo 3A State Champions
- 2024-2025 Boys Swimming 1A/2A State Champions

== Student body ==
- BHS has approximately 1,300 students. In 2010, 46% of the graduating class were Washington Honors Award winners.
- The class of 2010 had 92% of their students go to a 4-year college and 10% to a 2-year college.
- The graduation rate is approximately 93%.

== Notable alumni ==
- Laura Allen – actress (All My Children, The 4400, Mona Lisa Smile, Dirt)
- Chris Benz – designer
- Tori Black (born Michelle Chapman) – award-winning pornographic actress
- Dove Cameron (non-graduate) – actress (Liv and Maddie, The Mentalist, Cloud 9)
- Ben Eisenhardt – American-Israeli professional basketball player in the Israeli Basketball Premier League
- Steven Gray – professional European basketball player
- John D. Hawk – Medal of Honor recipient
- Fumiko Hayashida – activist and Japanese-American internee
- Chris Kattan – actor (Saturday Night Live, A Night at the Roxbury, The Middle, Undercover Brother)
- Kiel Reijnen – professional cyclist in the World Tour (riding for Trek–Segafredo)\
- JR Ritchie – American professional baseball pitcher for the Atlanta Braves of Major League Baseball
- Ben Shepherd – bassist (Soundgarden)
- Emily Silver – 2008 Olympic silver medalist in the 4×100 freestyle relay
- Marcel Vigneron – chef (Top Chef (season 2) runner-up)
- John Wicks – drummer (Fitz and the Tantrums, Cee Lo Green, Bruno Mars, Money Mark)
- Andrew Wood – lead singer of the band Mother Love Bone
