= St. John, Washington =

St. John
- Town
- St. John, Washington
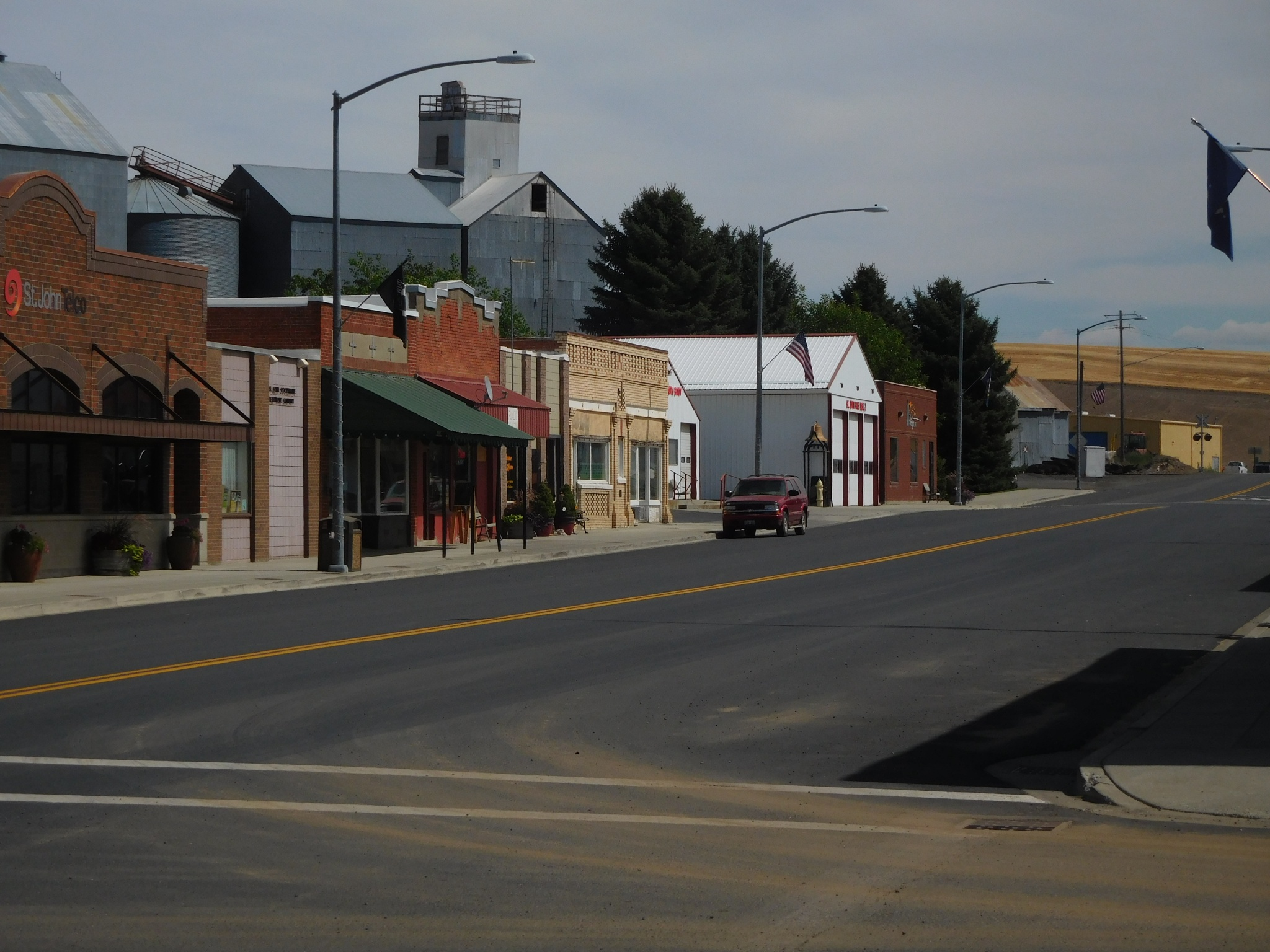

- Location of St. John, Washington
- Coordinates: 47°05′29″N 117°35′19″W
- Country: United States
- State: Washington
- County: Whitman

Government
  - Type: Mayor–council
  - Mayor: Michael Webb

Area
  - Total: 0.67 sq mi (1.74 km^{2})
  - Land: 0.67 sq mi (1.74 km^{2})
  - Water: 0 sq mi (0.00 km^{2})
- Elevation: 1,959 ft (597 m)

Population (2020)
  - Total: 599
  - Density: 892/sq mi (344/km^{2})
- Time zone: UTC-8 (Pacific (PST))
  - Summer (DST): UTC-7 (PDT)
- ZIP code: 99171
- Area code: 509
- FIPS code: 53-60860
- GNIS feature ID: 2412595
- Website: Town of St. John

St. John or Saint John is a town in Whitman County, Washington, United States. The population was 599 at the 2020 census. St. John is the birthplace of the twentieth governor of Washington, Mike Lowry.

== History ==
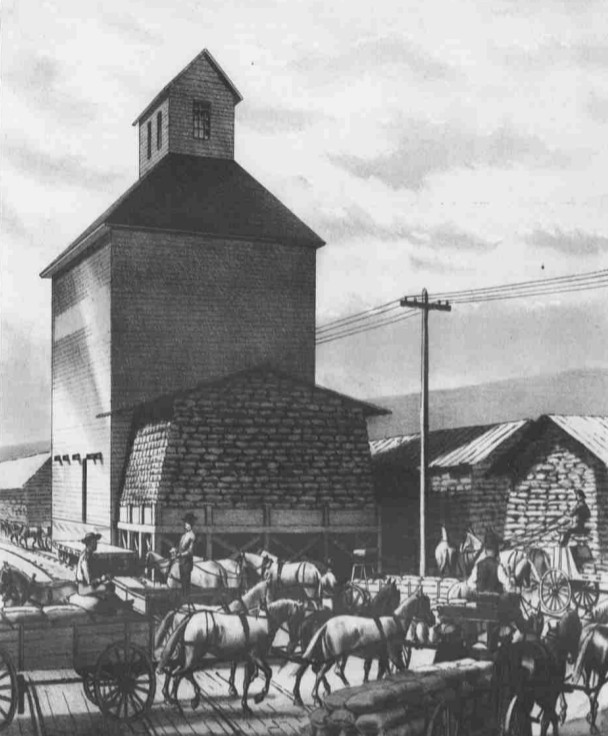
St. John, 1890

St. John was founded and named in the late 1880s for settler Edward Talbert St. John. St. John was officially incorporated on March 10, 1904.

Edward Talbert St. John (1812–1894) was the son of Pierce St. John and Mary Talbot/Talbert. Before making his way to Whitman County, Washington he abandoned his family in Indiana around 1845. He seems to have wandered around before settling in Whitman and founding the town of St. John.

== Geography ==
According to the United States Census Bureau, the town has a total area of 0.63 square miles (1.63 km^{2}), all of it land.

== Climate ==
St. John's climate is classified as warm-summer Mediterranean climate (Csb) according to the Köppen climate classification system, but nearly qualifies as a dry-summer humid continental climate due to its cold winter months.

Climate data for St. John, Washington (1991–2020 normals, extremes 1963–2020)
Month	Jan	Feb	Mar	Apr	May	Jun	Jul	Aug	Sep	Oct	Nov	Dec	Year
Record high °F (°C)	62 (17)	67 (19)	77 (25)	92 (33)	99 (37)	100 (38)	107 (42)	108 (42)	101 (38)	91 (33)	72 (22)	61 (16)	108 (42)
Mean daily maximum °F (°C)	36.6 (2.6)	41.3 (5.2)	49.4 (9.7)	57.2 (14.0)	66.4 (19.1)	73.1 (22.8)	83.6 (28.7)	83.5 (28.6)	73.9 (23.3)	59.0 (15.0)	44.0 (6.7)	35.1 (1.7)	58.6 (14.8)
Daily mean °F (°C)	32.6 (0.3)	35.7 (2.1)	41.8 (5.4)	47.7 (8.7)	55.6 (13.1)	61.4 (16.3)	69.0 (20.6)	68.4 (20.2)	60.3 (15.7)	48.8 (9.3)	38.5 (3.6)	31.5 (−0.3)	49.3 (9.6)
Mean daily minimum °F (°C)	28.7 (−1.8)	30.1 (−1.1)	34.1 (1.2)	38.2 (3.4)	44.8 (7.1)	49.7 (9.8)	54.4 (12.4)	53.3 (11.8)	46.7 (8.2)	38.6 (3.7)	33.0 (0.6)	27.9 (−2.3)	40.0 (4.4)
Record low °F (°C)	−28 (−33)	−21 (−29)	5 (−15)	12 (−11)	19 (−7)	25 (−4)	26 (−3)	26 (−3)	14 (−10)	6 (−14)	−18 (−28)	−23 (−31)	−28 (−33)
Average precipitation inches (mm)	2.05 (52)	1.52 (39)	1.90 (48)	1.54 (39)	1.56 (40)	1.12 (28)	0.43 (11)	0.34 (8.6)	0.56 (14)	1.50 (38)	2.15 (55)	2.38 (60)	17.05 (433)
Average snowfall inches (cm)	8.8 (22)	2.7 (6.9)	1.4 (3.6)	0.4 (1.0)	0.0 (0.0)	0.0 (0.0)	0.0 (0.0)	0.0 (0.0)	0.0 (0.0)	0.1 (0.25)	2.5 (6.4)	10.7 (27)	26.6 (68)
Average precipitation days (≥ 0.01 in)	13.6	10.9	11.9	10.3	9.1	7.8	3.3	3.0	4.4	9.0	13.3	13.5	110.1
Average snowy days (≥ 0.1 in)	5.8	2.6	1.6	0.5	0.0	0.0	0.0	0.0	0.0	0.1	2.1	6.2	18.9
Source: NOAA

== Demographics ==
Historical population
Census	Pop.	Note	%±
1910	421		—
1920	597		41.8%
1930	471		−21.1%
1940	526		11.7%
1950	542		3.0%
1960	545		0.6%
1970	575		5.5%
1980	529		−8.0%
1990	499		−5.7%
2000	548		9.8%
2010	537		−2.0%
2020	599		11.5%
U.S. Decennial Census

=== 2010 census ===
As of the 2010 census, there were 537 people, 261 households, and 145 families residing in the town. The population density was 852.4 inhabitants per square mile (329.1/km^{2}). There were 304 housing units at an average density of 482.5 units per square mile (186.3 units/km^{2}). The racial makeup of the town was 94.6% White, 0.2% African American, 0.4% Native American, 0.2% Asian, 0.4% Pacific Islander, 0.4% from other races, and 3.9% from two or more races. Hispanic or Latino of any race were 1.9% of the population.

There were 261 households, of which 22.2% had children under the age of 18 living with them, 47.1% were married couples living together, 6.9% had a female householder with no husband present, 1.5% had a male householder with no wife present, and 44.4% were non-families. 39.5% of all households were made up of individuals, and 22.6% had someone living alone who was 65 years of age or older. The average household size was 2.06 and the average family size was 2.78.

The median age in the town was 50.8 years. 22.3% of residents were under the age of 18; 3.8% were between the ages of 18 and 24; 15.3% were from 25 to 44; 28.8% were from 45 to 64; and 29.8% were 65 years of age or older. The gender makeup of the town was 45.8% male and 54.2% female.

=== 2000 census ===
As of the 2000 census, there were 548 people, 258 households, and 163 families residing in the town. The population density was 1,056.2 people per square mile (407.8 people/km^{2}). There were 279 housing units at an average density of 537.7 units per square mile (207.6 units/km^{2}). The racial makeup of the town was 97.81% White, 0.18% Native American, 0.55% Asian, and 1.46% from two or more races. Hispanic or Latino of any race were 1.64% of the population.

There were 258 households, out of which 22.1% had children under the age of 18 living with them, 54.7% were married couples living together, 5.8% had a female householder with no husband present, and 36.8% were non-families. 34.1% of all households were made up of individuals, and 20.2% had someone living alone who was 65 years of age or older. The average household size was 2.12 and the average family size was 2.72.

In the town, the age distribution of the population shows 20.8% under the age of 18, 3.3% from 18 to 24, 20.4% from 25 to 44, 25.2% from 45 to 64, and 30.3% who were 65 years of age or older. The median age was 49 years. For every 100 females, there were 93.6 males. For every 100 females age 18 and over, there were 86.3 males.

The median income for a household in the town was $33,393, and the median income for a family was $44,643. Males had a median income of $31,389 versus $18,750 for females. The per capita income for the town was $18,722. About 5.4% of families and 7.4% of the population were below the poverty line, including 13.2% of those under age 18 and 3.6% of those age 65 or over.
