= Liberty Christian School (Richland, Washington) =

Coordinates: 46°17′09″N 119°18′00″W

Liberty Christian School is a private, non-denominational Christian school located in Richland, Washington.

== Sources ==
http://www.libertychristian.net/
