= Royal City, Washington =

Royal City
- City
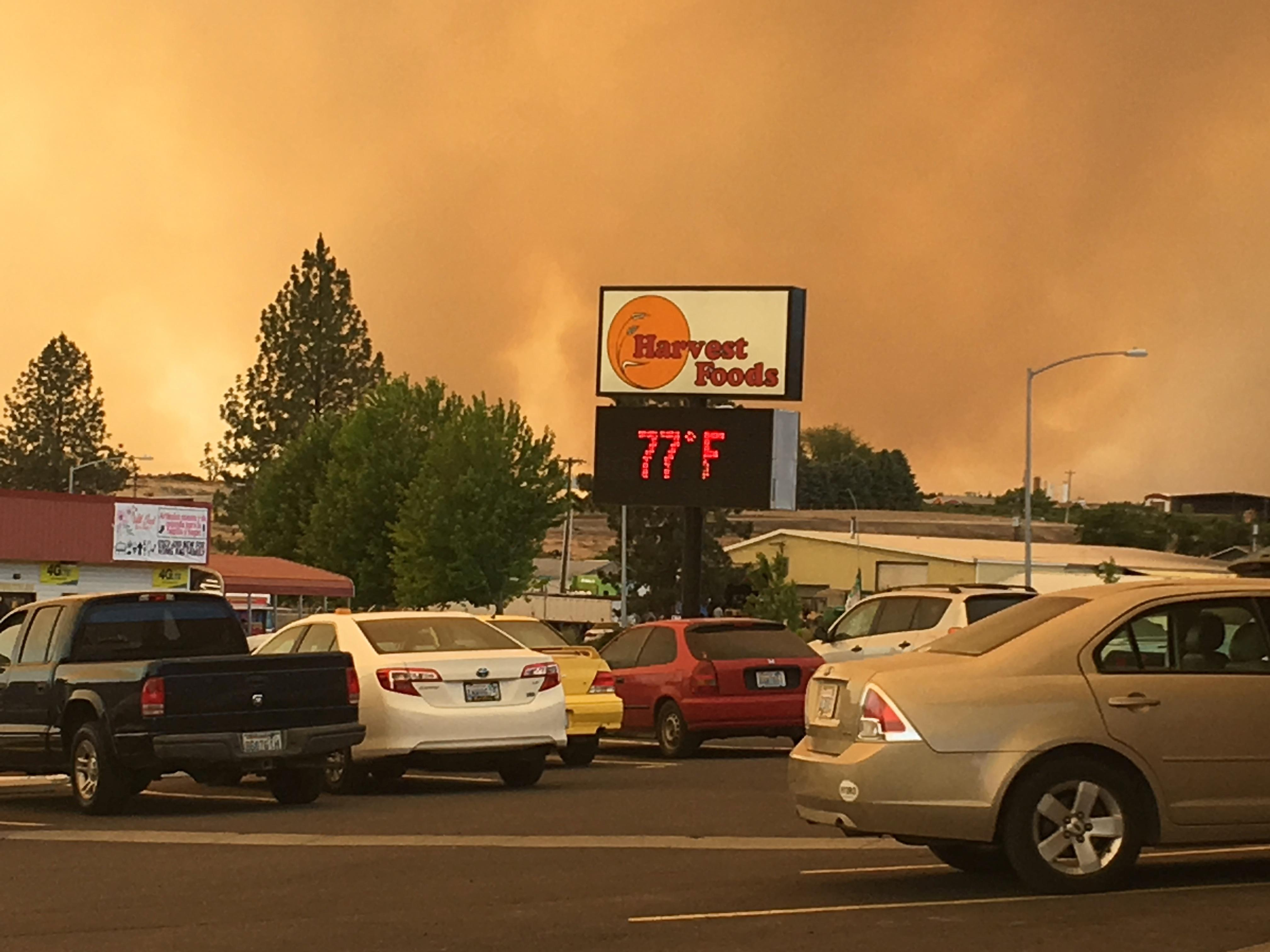

- Location of Royal City, Washington
- Coordinates: 46°54′09″N 119°37′48″W
- Country: United States
- State: Washington
- County: Grant

Government
  - Type: Mayor–council
  - Mayor: Michael Christensen

Area
  - Total: 1.16 sq mi (3.01 km^{2})
  - Land: 1.16 sq mi (3.01 km^{2})
  - Water: 0 sq mi (0.00 km^{2})
- Elevation: 1,004 ft (306 m)

Population (2020)
  - Total: 1,776
  - Density: 1,921.9/sq mi (742.06/km^{2})
- Time zone: UTC-8 (Pacific (PST))
  - Summer (DST): UTC-7 (PDT)
- ZIP code: 99357
- Area code: 509
- FIPS code: 53-60230
- GNIS feature ID: 2411011
- Website: royalcitywa.org

Royal City is a city in Grant County, Washington, United States. The population was 1,776 at the 2020 census.

== History ==
Royal City was founded in 1956 and officially incorporated on February 14, 1962. The townsite was previously named Royal Flats, and the entire area Royal Slope, thus the name Royal City. During the 1960s, there was a Titan I ICBM silo located near the town. The Royal Slope was named Washington state's 15th designated wine growing region (AVA - American Viticultural Area) on September 2, 2020.

Today, this small farming community is most known for producing a wide variety of crops, thanks to a long growing season. Apples, cherries, peaches, timothy and alfalfa hay, melons, potatoes, onions, wine grapes, pears, mint and corn are grown in this area. The Royal Slope area is a popular place for birders, hunters, and golfers as well.

The Royal Knights (Royal High School) have won division 1A state football titles in 1996, 2000, 2004, 2005, 2006, 2015, 2016, 2017, 2019, 2020, 2021, 2022, 2023, 2024 and 2025. The Royal High Knight mascot and colors, black and gold, were selected by the ASB class officers of 1965.

== Geography ==
According to the United States Census Bureau, the city has a total area of 1.35 square miles (3.50 km^{2}), all of it land.

== Demographics ==
Historical population
Census	Pop.	Note	%±
1970	477		—
1980	676		41.7%
1990	1,104		63.3%
2000	1,823		65.1%
2010	2,140		17.4%
2020	1,776		−17.0%
U.S. Decennial Census; 2020 Census

=== 2020 census ===
As of the 2020 census, Royal City had a population of 1,776. The median age was 25.6 years. 39.4% of residents were under the age of 18 and 5.3% of residents were 65 years of age or older. For every 100 females there were 106.8 males, and for every 100 females age 18 and over there were 108.5 males age 18 and over.

0.0% of residents lived in urban areas, while 100.0% lived in rural areas.

There were 485 households in Royal City, of which 63.7% had children under the age of 18 living in them. Of all households, 54.8% were married-couple households, 15.9% were households with a male householder and no spouse or partner present, and 21.0% were households with a female householder and no spouse or partner present. About 12.2% of all households were made up of individuals and 3.7% had someone living alone who was 65 years of age or older.

There were 520 housing units, of which 6.7% were vacant. The homeowner vacancy rate was 1.6% and the rental vacancy rate was 3.7%.

Racial composition as of the 2020 census
Race	Number	Percent
White	387	21.8%
Black or African American	7	0.4%
American Indian and Alaska Native	16	0.9%
Asian	1	0.1%
Native Hawaiian and Other Pacific Islander	0	0.0%
Some other race	1,053	59.3%
Two or more races	312	17.6%
Hispanic or Latino (of any race)	1,561	87.9%

=== 2010 census ===
As of the 2010 census, there were 2,140 people, 486 households, and 439 families living in the city. The population density was 1,585.2 inhabitants per square mile (612.0/km^{2}). There were 494 housing units at an average density of 365.9 per square mile (141.3/km^{2}). The racial makeup of the city was 45.7% White, 1.2% African American, 0.8% Native American, 0.9% Asian, 48.7% from other races, and 2.7% from two or more races. Hispanic or Latino of any race were 88.7% of the population.

There were 486 households, of which 72.2% had children under the age of 18 living with them, 62.1% were married couples living together, 11.5% had a female householder with no husband present, 16.7% had a male householder with no wife present, and 9.7% were non-families. 4.9% of all households were made up of individuals, and 2% had someone living alone who was 65 years of age or older. The average household size was 4.26 and the average family size was 4.20.

The median age in the city was 22.4 years. 40.1% of residents were under the age of 18; 14.7% were between the ages of 18 and 24; 30.6% were from 25 to 44; 11.8% were from 45 to 64; and 2.9% were 65 years of age or older. The gender makeup of the city was 53.3% male and 46.7% female.

=== 2000 census ===
As of the 2000 census, there were 1,823 people, 444 households, and 380 families living in the city. The population density was 1,445.6 people per square mile (558.6/km^{2}). There were 504 housing units at an average density of 399.7 per square mile (154.4/km^{2}). The racial makeup of the city was 66.32% White, 0.38% African American, 0.38% Native American, 0.55% Asian, 29.90% from other races, and 2.47% from two or more races. Hispanic or Latino of any race were 78.22% of the population.

There were 444 households, out of which 64.6% had children under the age of 18 living with them, 67.3% were married couples living together, 8.8% had a female householder with no husband present, and 14.4% were non-families. 10.6% of all households were made up of individuals, and 5.9% had someone living alone who was 65 years of age or older. The average household size was 4.10 and the average family size was 4.33.

In the city, the population was spread out, with 40.3% under the age of 18, 12.4% from 18 to 24, 31.9% from 25 to 44, 11.0% from 45 to 64, and 4.4% who were 65 years of age or older. The median age was 24 years. For every 100 females, there were 126.2 males. For every 100 females age 18 and over, there were 132.0 males.

The median income for a household in the city was $28,529, and the median income for a family was $29,821. Males had a median income of $19,643 versus $22,917 for females. The per capita income for the city was $9,502. About 24.0% of families and 26.7% of the population were below the poverty line, including 35.0% of those under age 18 and 7.9% of those age 65 or over.

== Education ==
The city is served by the Royal School District.
