= Bickleton, Washington =

- Census-designated place
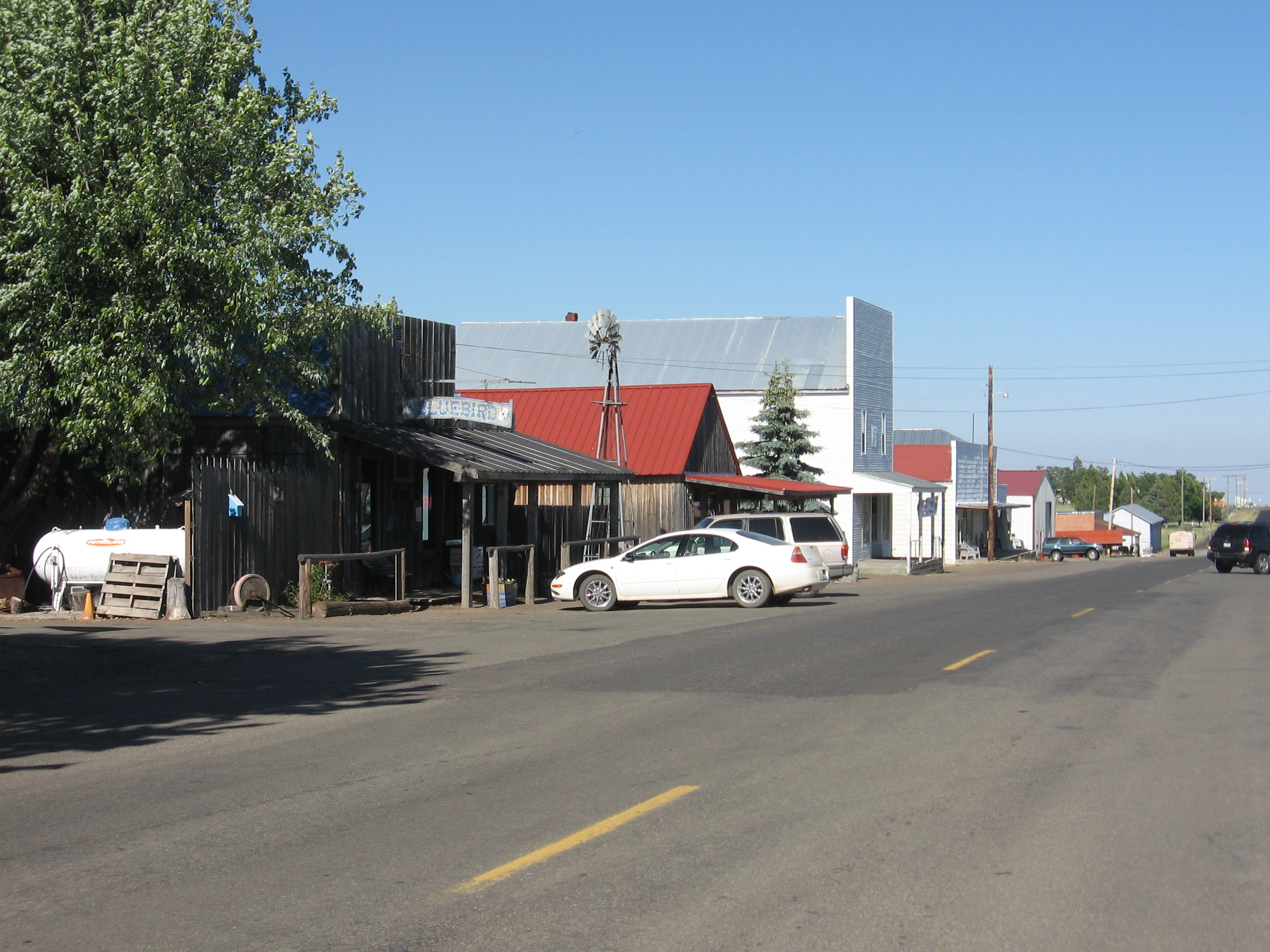
- The Bluebird Tavern in Bickleton

- Location of Bickleton in Klickitat County, Washington
- Coordinates: 45°59′53″N 120°18′25″W
- Country: United States
- State: Washington
- County: Klickitat
- Established: 1879

Area
  - Total: 4.7 sq mi (12.1 km^{2})
  - Land: 4.7 sq mi (12.1 km^{2})
  - Water: 0 sq mi (0.0 km^{2})
- Elevation: 3,160 ft (960 m)

Population (2020)
  - Total: 92
  - Density: 20/sq mi (7.6/km^{2})
- Time zone: UTC-8 (Pacific (PST))
  - Summer (DST): UTC-7 (PDT)
- ZIP code: 99322
- Area code: 509
- FIPS code: 53-05980
- GNIS feature ID: 2407836

Bickleton is an unincorporated community and census-designated place in Klickitat County, Washington, United States. Bickleton was first settled by Charles N. Bickle and established in 1879. The population was 92 at the 2020 census, up from 88 at the 2010 census.

== History ==
Bickleton was first settled by Charles N. Bickle, who established a trading post and livery stable at the site. He also served as the area's first postmaster. In 1879, the town was named after Bickle. The town's economy was initially based largely on cattle ranching and wheat farming. A series of fires in 1937 and 1947 destroyed many of the town's original buildings.

The oldest surviving building in Bickleton is the Bluebird Inn, a tavern which first opened in 1882. It is billed as the oldest functioning tavern in the state, although it has changed ownership numerous times and operated under different names throughout its history. (Note: The Brick Tavern in Roslyn claims the title of the oldest continuously operating tavern in the state of Washington, opening in 1889 and operating under a single name since 1898. The Bluebird Inn, according to its owners, is the state's oldest functioning tavern, having first opened in 1882; however, it has operated under numerous names and has not been continuously licensed to operate since its founding.) The tavern includes a 1903 Brunswick pool table, which is still used by regulars.

The town has held an annual picnic and rodeo continuously since 1910. The festival also features a 1905 Herschell-Spillman carousel, which the town purchased from Oaks Amusement Park in Portland, Oregon, in 1928.

=== Bluebirds ===
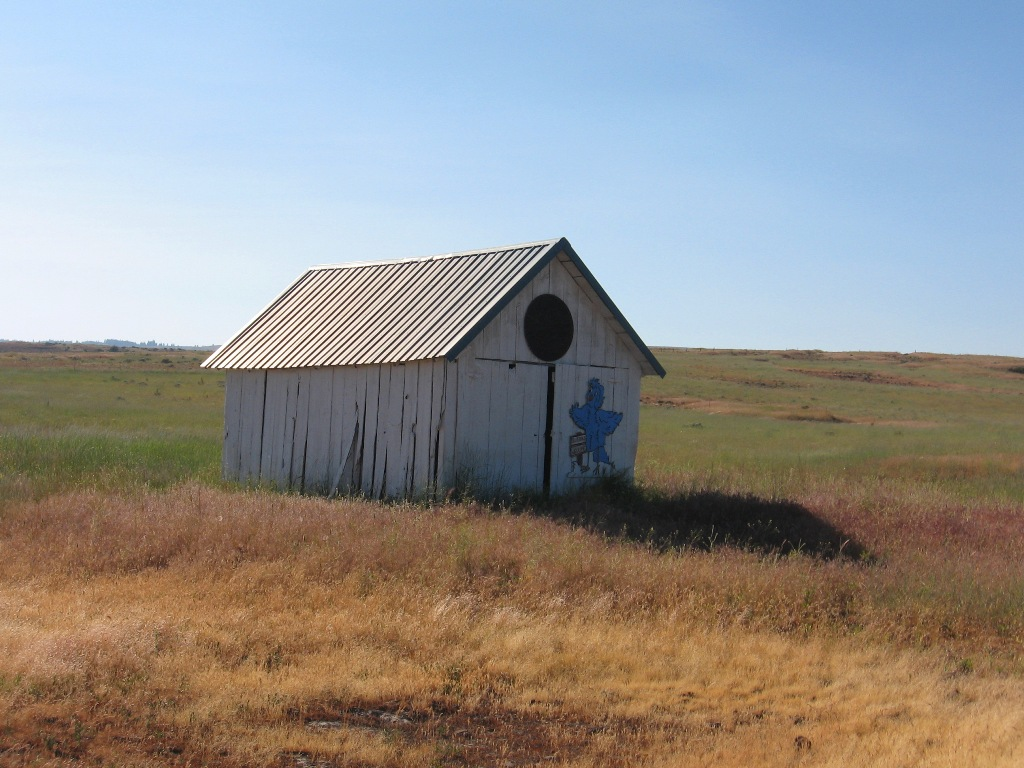
A shed outside of Bickleton proudly showing the bluebird connection

Bickleton is known as the bluebird capital of the world. In the 1960s, Jess and Elva Brinkerhoff were picnicking in this small town after coming from nearby Richland and put a can in a tree for some birds. It became a local fad, and now there are thousands of birdhouses purposely built to house bluebirds.

Both the mountain bluebird and the western bluebird nest in Bickleton. Maintaining the houses by cleaning old nests is a major task for the local residents. It is funded by profits from bluebird souvenirs sold to tourists at Whitmore's Whoop-n-Holler Ranch Museum.

Two volunteers from Portland, Oregon, Patti Bright and Amy Sills, have been assisting in replacing some of the more dilapidated birdhouses in July 2026. They noticed over the years the birdhouses falling apart due to weather and neglect. After securing approval from the residents, they began replacing, doing 24 in July and 37 more ready for October 2026. The houses and materials were sourced from an Amazon wishlist, many donated by the city residents.

== Geography ==
Bickleton is in northeastern Klickitat County, south of the Horse Heaven Hills and the Yakama Indian Reservation. It is 66 miles (106 km) west of Kennewick and 22 miles (35 km) north of the Columbia River at Roosevelt.

According to the United States Census Bureau, the Bickleton CDP has a total area of 4.7 square miles (12.1 km^{2}), all of it land.

=== Climate ===
According to the Köppen Climate Classification system, Bickleton has a warm-summer Mediterranean climate, abbreviated "Csb" on climate maps.

Climate data for Bickleton, Washington (1991–2020 normals, extremes 1928–2018)
Month	Jan	Feb	Mar	Apr	May	Jun	Jul	Aug	Sep	Oct	Nov	Dec	Year
Record high °F (°C)	66 (19)	65 (18)	70 (21)	85 (29)	92 (33)	108 (42)	102 (39)	102 (39)	97 (36)	87 (31)	71 (22)	65 (18)	108 (42)
Mean daily maximum °F (°C)	35.1 (1.7)	38.5 (3.6)	46.0 (7.8)	52.8 (11.6)	62.2 (16.8)	69.7 (20.9)	80.7 (27.1)	80.0 (26.7)	70.7 (21.5)	56.4 (13.6)	42.4 (5.8)	33.7 (0.9)	55.7 (13.2)
Daily mean °F (°C)	29.8 (−1.2)	32.2 (0.1)	38.2 (3.4)	43.5 (6.4)	51.6 (10.9)	57.9 (14.4)	67.2 (19.6)	67.0 (19.4)	59.0 (15.0)	46.6 (8.1)	35.8 (2.1)	28.5 (−1.9)	46.4 (8.0)
Mean daily minimum °F (°C)	24.4 (−4.2)	26.0 (−3.3)	30.3 (−0.9)	34.2 (1.2)	41.0 (5.0)	46.1 (7.8)	53.8 (12.1)	54.0 (12.2)	47.3 (8.5)	36.9 (2.7)	29.1 (−1.6)	23.3 (−4.8)	37.2 (2.9)
Record low °F (°C)	−13 (−25)	−12 (−24)	1 (−17)	15 (−9)	20 (−7)	27 (−3)	30 (−1)	30 (−1)	27 (−3)	8 (−13)	−12 (−24)	−17 (−27)	−17 (−27)
Average precipitation inches (mm)	2.01 (51)	1.64 (42)	1.51 (38)	1.03 (26)	1.33 (34)	0.82 (21)	0.25 (6.4)	0.35 (8.9)	0.44 (11)	1.00 (25)	2.12 (54)	2.52 (64)	15.02 (382)
Average snowfall inches (cm)	8.1 (21)	5.1 (13)	1.5 (3.8)	0.6 (1.5)	0.6 (1.5)	0.0 (0.0)	0.0 (0.0)	0.0 (0.0)	0.0 (0.0)	0.2 (0.51)	2.4 (6.1)	12.1 (31)	30.6 (78)
Average precipitation days (≥ 0.01 in)	10.2	8.6	8.7	7.0	6.1	4.1	2.0	2.0	1.9	6.5	9.3	11.0	77.4
Average snowy days (≥ 0.1 in)	3.4	3.2	1.6	0.2	0.1	0.0	0.0	0.0	0.0	0.2	1.8	5.5	16.0
Source: NOAA

== Demographics ==
Historical population
Census	Pop.	Note	%±
2000	113		—
2010	88		−22.1%
2020	92		4.5%
U.S. Decennial Census; 1990 2000 2010

Bickleton first appeared as a census designated place in the 2000 U.S. census.

=== Racial and ethnic composition ===
Bickleton CDP, Washington – Racial and ethnic composition Note: the US Census treats Hispanic/Latino as an ethnic category. This table excludes Latinos from the racial categories and assigns them to a separate category. Hispanics/Latinos may be of any race.
Race / Ethnicity (NH = Non-Hispanic)	Pop 2000	Pop 2010	Pop 2020	% 2000	% 2010	% 2020
White alone (NH)	100	80	75	88.50%	90.91%	81.52%
Black or African American alone (NH)	0	0	0	0.00%	0.00%	0.00%
Native American or Alaska Native alone (NH)	3	3	0	2.65%	3.41%	0.00%
Asian alone (NH)	0	1	0	0.00%	1.14%	0.00%
Native Hawaiian or Pacific Islander alone (NH)	3	0	0	2.65%	0.00%	0.00%
Other race alone (NH)	0	0	0	0.00%	0.00%	0.00%
Mixed race or Multiracial (NH)	0	1	3	0.00%	1.14%	3.26%
Hispanic or Latino (any race)	7	3	14	6.19%	3.41%	15.22%
Total	113	88	92	100.00%	100.00%	100.00%

=== 2000 census ===
As of the census of 2000, there were 113 people, 49 households, and 31 families residing in the CDP. The population density was 8.8 people per square mile (3.4/km^{2}). There were 65 housing units at an average density of 5.0/sq mi (1.9/km^{2}). The racial makeup of the CDP was 92.92% White, 2.65% Native American, 2.65% Pacific Islander, 1.77% from other races. Hispanic or Latino of any race were 6.19% of the population.

There were 49 households, out of which 26.5% had children under the age of 18 living with them, 55.1% were married couples living together, 6.1% had a female householder with no husband present, and 36.7% were non-families. 28.6% of all households were made up of individuals, and 12.2% had someone living alone who was 65 years of age or older. The average household size was 2.31 and the average family size was 2.87.

In the CDP, the population was spread out, with 25.7% under the age of 18, 3.5% from 18 to 24, 26.5% from 25 to 44, 29.2% from 45 to 64, and 15.0% who were 65 years of age or older. The median age was 42 years. For every 100 females, there were 91.5 males. For every 100 females age 18 and over, there were 90.9 males.

The median income for a household in the CDP was $34,500, and the median income for a family was $48,125. Males had a median income of $42,500 versus $0 for females. The per capita income for the CDP was $17,580. There were 20.0% of families and 20.2% of the population living below the poverty line, including 36.1% of under eighteens and none of those over 64.
