= High Bridge Park =

Park in Spokane, Washington, US

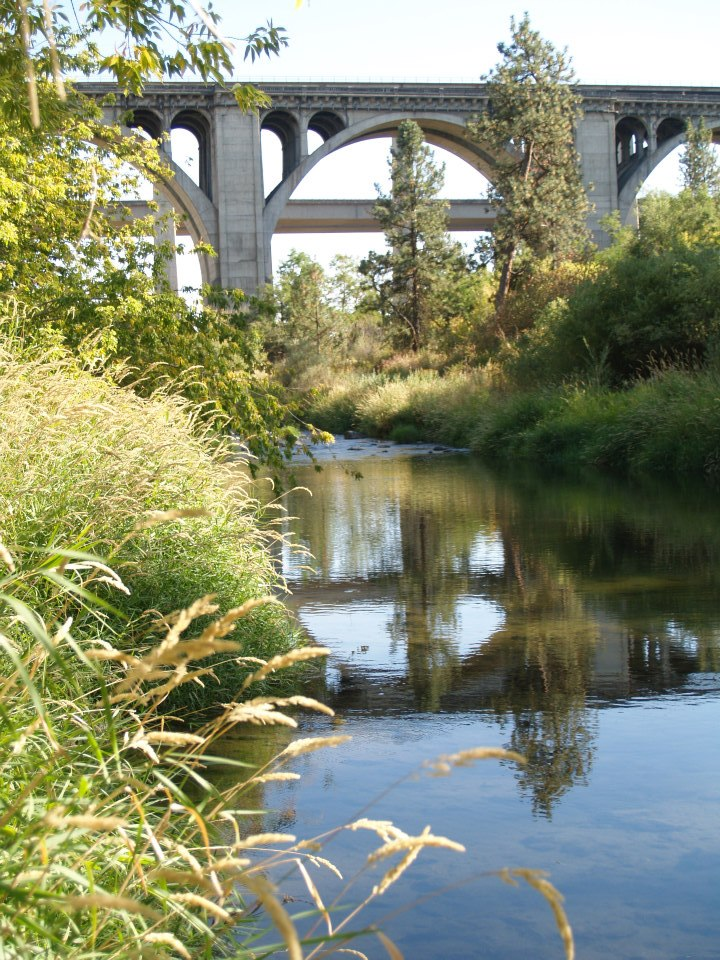
- The high bridges above the park and Latah Creek
- Interactive map of High Bridge Park
- Type: Urban Park
- Location: Spokane, Washington, U.S.
- Coordinates: 47°39′04″N 117°27′03″W
- Area: 200 acres (0.81 km^{2})
- Elevation: 1,750 feet (530 m) AMSL
- Established: 1952; 74 years ago
- Operator: Spokane Parks and Recreation Department
- Status: Open year-round (daily 5 a.m. to 11 p.m.)
- Public transit: Spokane Transit Authority; Routes 20, 60, 61

High Bridge Park is a public park in the northwest United States, located at Riverside Ave. and A St. in Latah/Hangman, Spokane, Washington. Comprising 200 acres (0.81 km^{2}), it is open daily, without charge.

The park is located at the lower end of the valley cut by Latah Creek, which runs along the eastern boundary of the park, just above its confluence with the Spokane River. The valley carved by the creek is crossed by three bridges carrying Interstate 90, Sunset Boulevard, and a railroad. These bridges cross above the southern portion of the park.

Much of the park is forested and unmaintained. There is an 18-hole disc golf course located in the northern section of the park among the trees. In the center of the park is a grass field, picnic shelter and playground. High Bridge Dog Park is located across A Street in the west of the park.

== History ==
High Bridge Park has seen a variety of uses over the years. Archaeological work found human habitation dating back over 8,000 years. After its establishment as city property, the park has housed a tuberculosis sanitarium, federal military housing, campgrounds, a garbage dump and ultimately a city park with both developed areas and those left to nature.

Due to its proximity to the city center, the area that would become High Bridge Park was annexed into the city of Spokane in 1891, ten years after the city was incorporated. The name High Bridge Park was given to the area in 1913, two years after the Sunset Boulevard Bridge was completed. One year later, in 1914, a second high bridge was completed over the park. The Oregon-Washington Railroad and Navigation Company's 100-foot-high (30 m) steel trestle passed over the northern section of the park and the Spokane River.

In 1920, the city converted the park into a tourist camp. With the Sunset Boulevard Bridge carrying the Sunset Highway and the city center nearby, the park was in an ideal location to accommodate automotive travelers. During World War II, the camp was converted into temporary military housing for families and veterans from nearby Geiger Field and the Spokane Army Air Depot (now Fairchild Air Force Base). After the war, the housing was removed and the tourist camp reestablished. The last record of camping at High Bridge Park was in 1955.

Ahead of Expo '74, Spokane's railroad infrastructure was dramatically altered. The 1914 trestle was abandoned and ultimately demolished in 1978. During Expo '74, the park's campgrounds were reestablished to accommodate visitors to the fair which was taking place within walking distance at what is now Riverfront Park. The park fell into decline after the end of the fair. A railroad car on display in the park became a target for looters and vandals and was removed for safekeeping in 1985. The park board attempted to decide a future for the park in 1988 but was unable to reach a consensus.

In the 1990s, High Bridge Park developed a reputation for public sex acts. Between 2001 and 2006, the Spokane police department received 27 calls about lewd conduct and 6 people were arrested in June 2006. It was during this time that the city began some efforts to improve the park, including the construction of the disc golf course and a bike trail.

=== Expansion ===
At some point, the original 40-acre park was expanded to its current 200-acre (0.81 km^{2}) footprint. The expansion saw areas on the opposite side of Latah Creek, commonly known as People's Park, incorporated into High Bridge Park, along with a section of the north bank of the Spokane River.

The area known as People's Park, where Latah Creek meets the Spokane River, has been an important meeting and fishing site for indigenous peoples for hundreds or thousands of years. A 2005 archaeological study by researchers from Eastern Washington University uncovered hearths, tools and bones dating back over 8,000 years. Native people continued to flock to the site for its prolific salmon runs into the 1900s, when in 1911 Little Falls Dam was constructed downstream on the Spokane River and blocked the salmon from continuing upstream.

Like the rest of High Bridge Park, People's Park was converted into a campsite for Expo '74. The People's Park area was specifically designated as a camp for transient youth, meant to accommodate hippies and the homeless. The camp grew to house 1,800 people in an alternative lifestyle community with services, gardens and a market. The camp was disbanded after the end of the Expo, but the People's Park area maintained its reputation for alternative lifestyles in the decades to follow. The area became known for its nude beach, promiscuous behavior, drug use and associated crime.

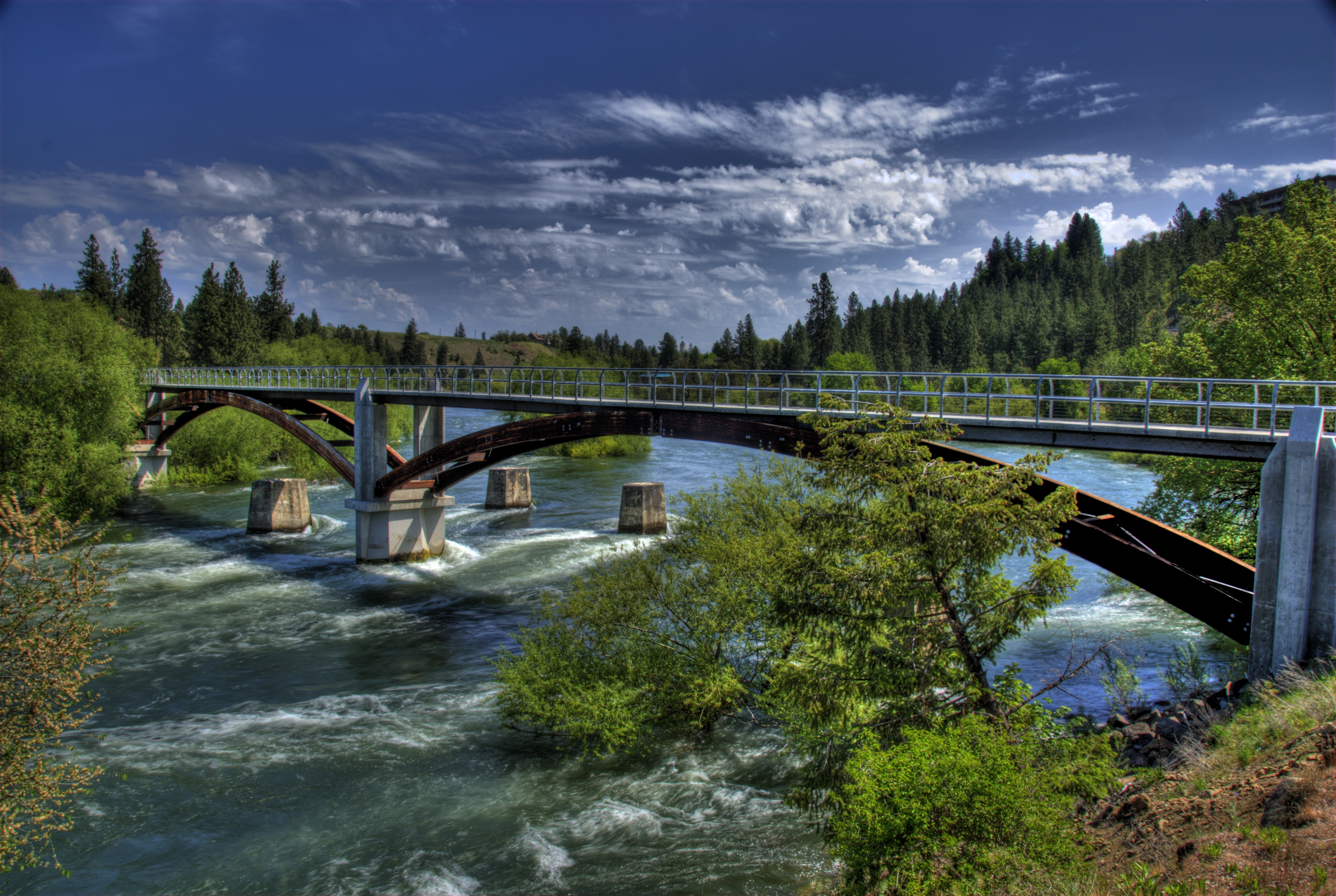
The Sandifur Memorial Bridge

Since the start of the 21st century, High Bridge Park including the areas beyond Latah Creek and the Spokane River, have been generating renewed investment. In 2004, the Sandifur Memorial Bridge was completed connecting People's Park to the north bank of the river and the West Central neighborhood. The pedestrian and cyclist bridge links trails and bike routes on the south side of the river with the Spokane River Centennial Trail on the north. The disc golf course in High Bridge Park was also constructed around that time. The High Bridge Dog Park, the city's first, was established in 2011. In 2020, the People's Park parking lot was paved and surrounding areas refurbished with public art and informative signage. In 2021, the city moved forward with a plan to connect the Fish Lake Trail, which ends just south of the park, with the Centennial Trail north of the park, with the connection passing through the park. The city gave approval in 2023 for the American Indian Community Center to construct a facility in the park on two undeveloped acres at the intersection of Riverside Avenue and A Street. Upgrades to the dog park focusing on safety and accessibility began in 2024.

== Setting ==
High Bridge Park is located along the lower reaches of Latah Creek where it joins the Spokane River, stretching from the north bank of the river extending from Broadway Avenue in the north, south to 11th Avenue at the bridge over Latah Creek approximately. Much of the park is located on steep hillsides that descend to the river and creek. The surrounding terrain drops rapidly from approximately 1,900 feet above sea level to approximately 1,720 feet where Latah Creek enters the Spokane River. The only expanse of relatively flat land is in the People's Park area on the peninsula between the creek and the river. Both Latah Creek, coming from the south, and the Spokane River from the west, cut deep, thin gorges through the surrounding Columbia Plateau. A third watercourse, the comparatively much smaller Indian Canyon Creek, enters Latah Creek just before the latter's mouth at the Spokane River in the far northwestern corner of the park. The similarly sized Garden Springs Creek enters Latah Creek at the 11th Avenue Bridge on the park's southern boundary. Garden Springs Creek is open to the public about a mile upstream at the John A. Finch Arboretum.

The park consists of 200 acres, 137 of which are undeveloped. Its size, and location straddling multiple natural boundaries, has led to the park stretching into five different neighborhoods. The original 40 acre park and most of the current 200 acre park is located in the Latah/Hangman neighborhood. Areas east of Latah Creek and south of Riverside Avenue are in Browne's Addition while the People's Park section north of Riverside Avenue is in Peaceful Valley. North of the river the park is in the West Central neighborhood. and a small portion of the park between Riverside Avenue and Latah Creek is in the West Hills neighborhood.

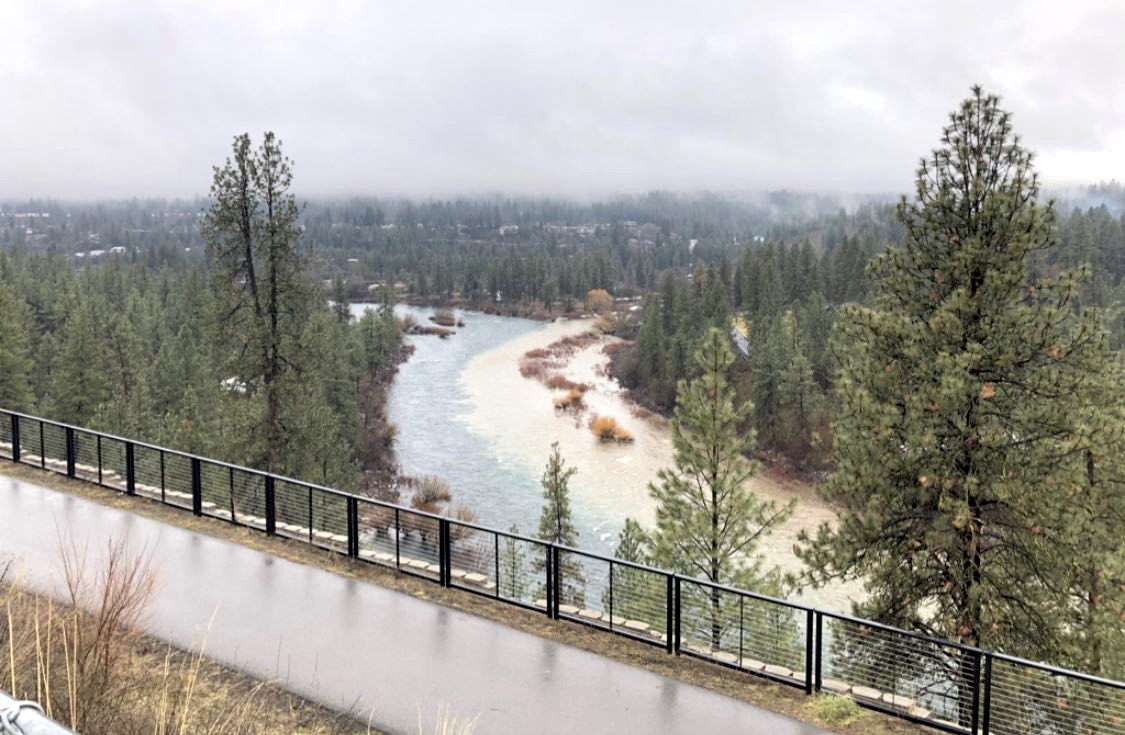
Latah Creek entering the Spokane River during a period of high turbidity.

Many species of plants can be found in the park. Ponderosa pine are numerous throughout the park while willow can be found along the banks of the river and creek. Smaller crabapple and prune trees grow in the shade of the pines along with larger maple and locust. Along the ground, grasses, wild rose and numerous berry-producing shrubs. Beaver, deer, porcupine and Spokane's emblematic marmot are common. Crayfish and redband trout can be found in the waterways.

Due to riparian habitat destruction caused by agricultural use in the Latah Creek watershed, the stream can carry high loads of sediment downstream. During winter snow melt and after heavy rains, the creek regularly takes on a significant brown color due to high turbidity which contrasts dramatically with the waters of the Spokane River where the two converge. These sediments are then deposited on the bed of the creek and river causing damage to the aquatic habitat, especially for the redband trout.

== Gallery ==
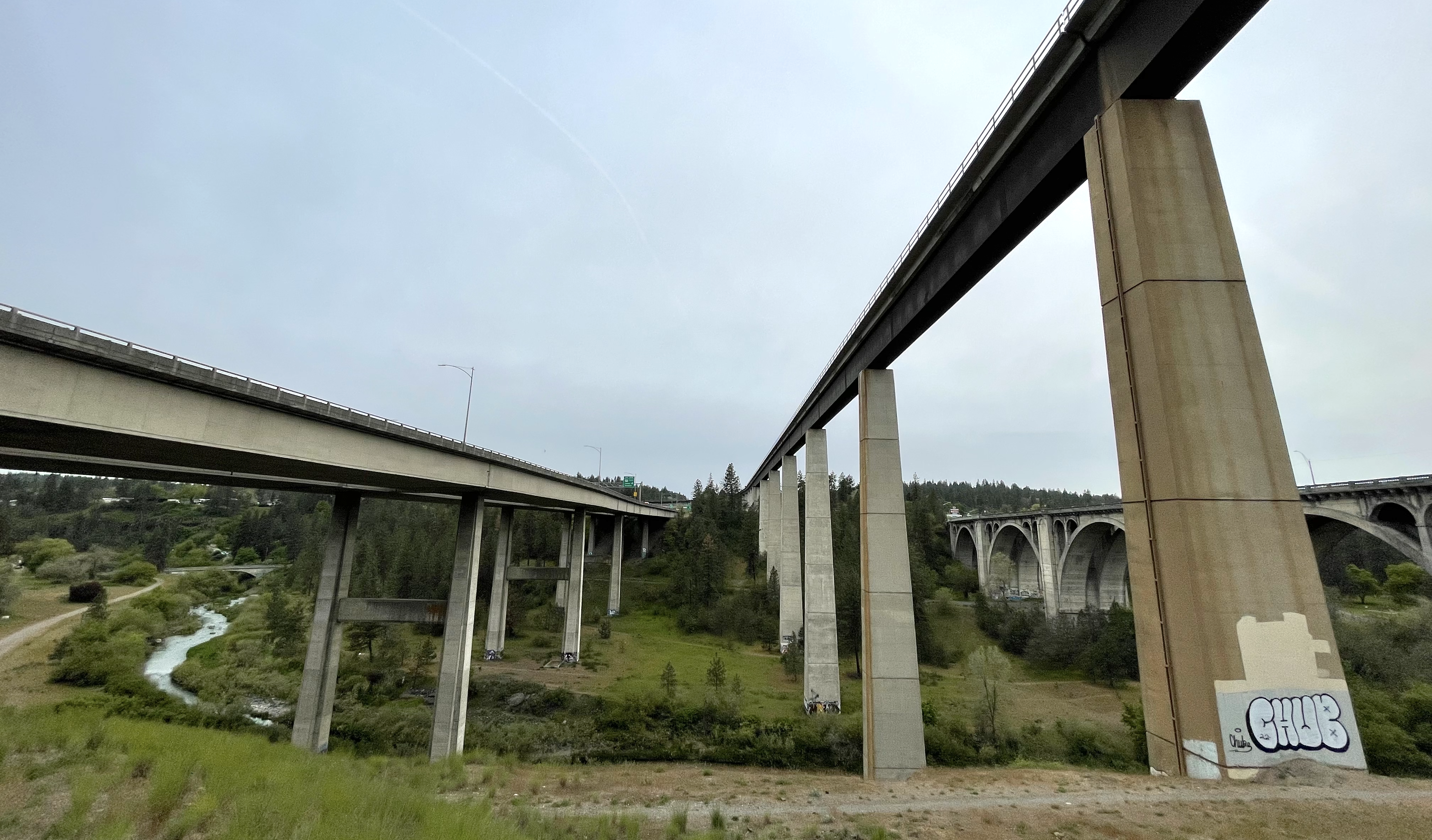
From left-to-right, the I-90, High Bridge and Sunset Boulevard Bridges passing over Latah Creek in the southern portion of High Bridge Park

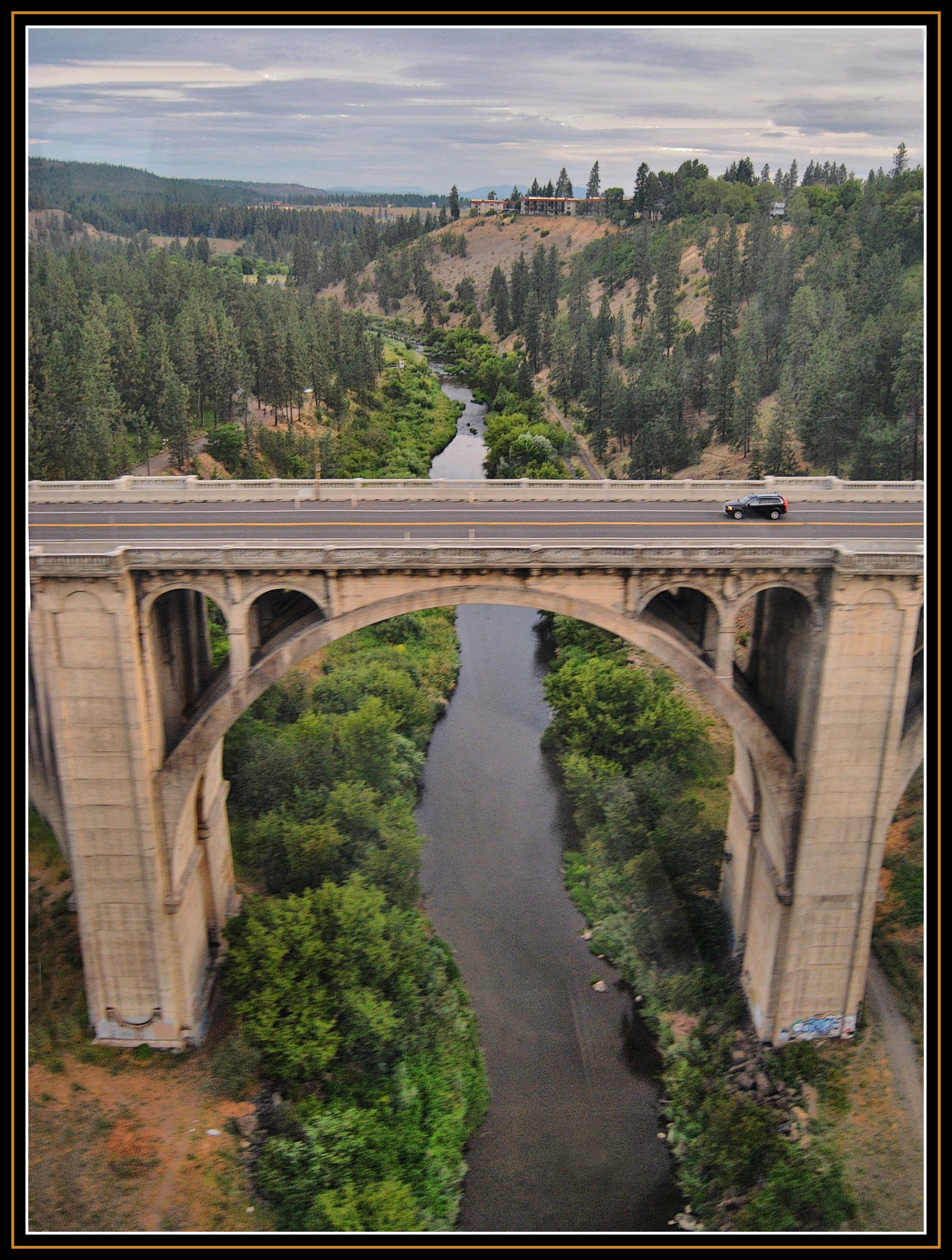
High Bridge Park looking north from the railroad bridge, showing the Sunset Boulevard Bridge and Latah Creek

== See also ==
- Spokane, Washington - Parks and recreation
- High Bridge (Latah Creek)
