= High Bridge (Latah Creek) =

Railroad bridge in Spokane, Washington, U.S.

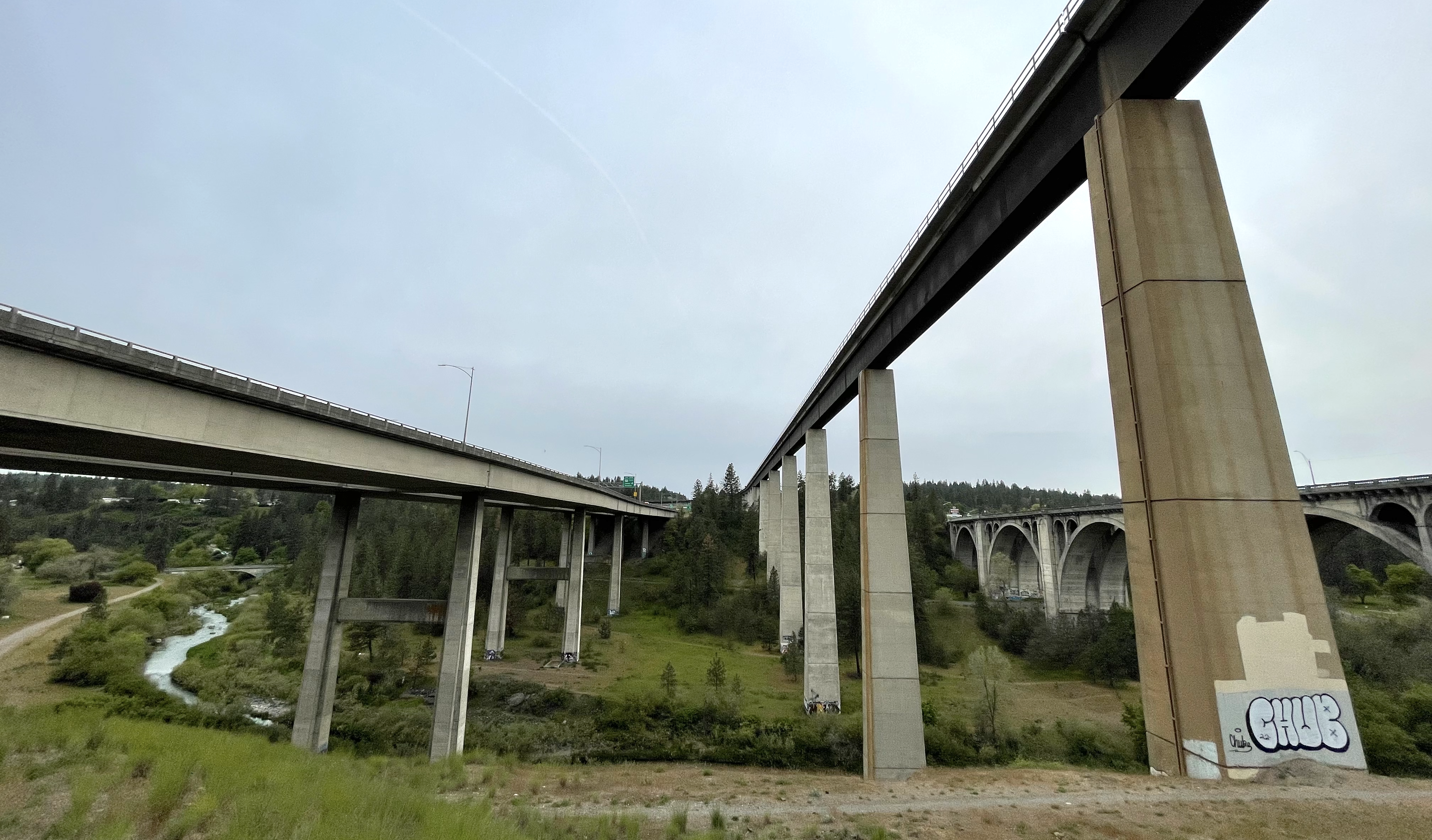
- High Bridge (right)
- Coordinates: 47.6488°N 117.4476°W
- Carries: Trains
- Crosses: Latah Creek; Interstate 90
- Locale: Spokane, Washington, U.S.
- Other name(s): Latah Creek Viaduct, Latah Junction
- Owner: BNSF Railway

Characteristics
- Design: Box girder
- Total length: 3,950 feet (1,200 m)
- Height: 175 feet (53 m)

Rail characteristics
- No. of tracks: 1

History
- Architect: Warren C. Heylman
- Construction cost: $10,000,000
- Opened: December 1972; 53 years ago
- Replaces: Oregon-Washington Railroad & Navigation Company's (later Union Pacific) High Bridge (1914)

Location
- Interactive map of High Bridge

High Bridgeis a railroad bridge over Latah Creek in Spokane, Washington. It was constructed in 1972 by the Burlington Northern Railroad, following that railroad's creation in 1970 through the merger of the Chicago, Burlington & Quincy, Great Northern, Northern Pacific, and Spokane, Portland & Seattle railways. The bridge links the former Northern Pacific mainline with the former Great Northern and Spokane, Portland & Seattle lines to the west. The Latah Creek railroad bridge and two bridges carrying Interstate 90 and Sunset Highway cross High Bridge Park and the Latah/Hangman neighborhood of Spokane from Downtown Spokane on the east into the West Hills and Grandview/Thorpe neighborhoods to the west.

The bridge is 3,950 feet (1,200 m) long, and its piers reach up to 175 feet (53 m) from the Latah Creek canyon floor. It is constructed of six weathering high-strength steel 160-foot-long (49 m) box girders spans bridging the canyon itself, with adjacent spans from 80 to 100 feet (24 to 30 m), supported by concrete piers. A ballasted concrete deck slab supports the railroad track. The western end of the bridge splits to form a wye.

Although not the architect on record, Warren C. Heylman is said to have been the architect behind the design of the bridge, writing Burlington Northern with his "free and unsolicited" advice after he saw the initial plans for the bridge over Hangman valley that was to replace the downtown rail line they had removed in preparation for Expo '74, saying he had to act after seeing their heavily trellised design that would have obscured the historic arches of the Latah Creek Bridge. Heylman never heard back from the railroad company, but says that bridge that was built, a much simpler design with long concrete legs that complemented the nearby I-90 bridge was his. According to the opinion of Washington State University architecture and engineering professor, David Scott, the bridge is arguably Heylman's best work, saying it is "one of the finest examples of what a railroad bridge can look like or be."
