= Garden Springs Creek =

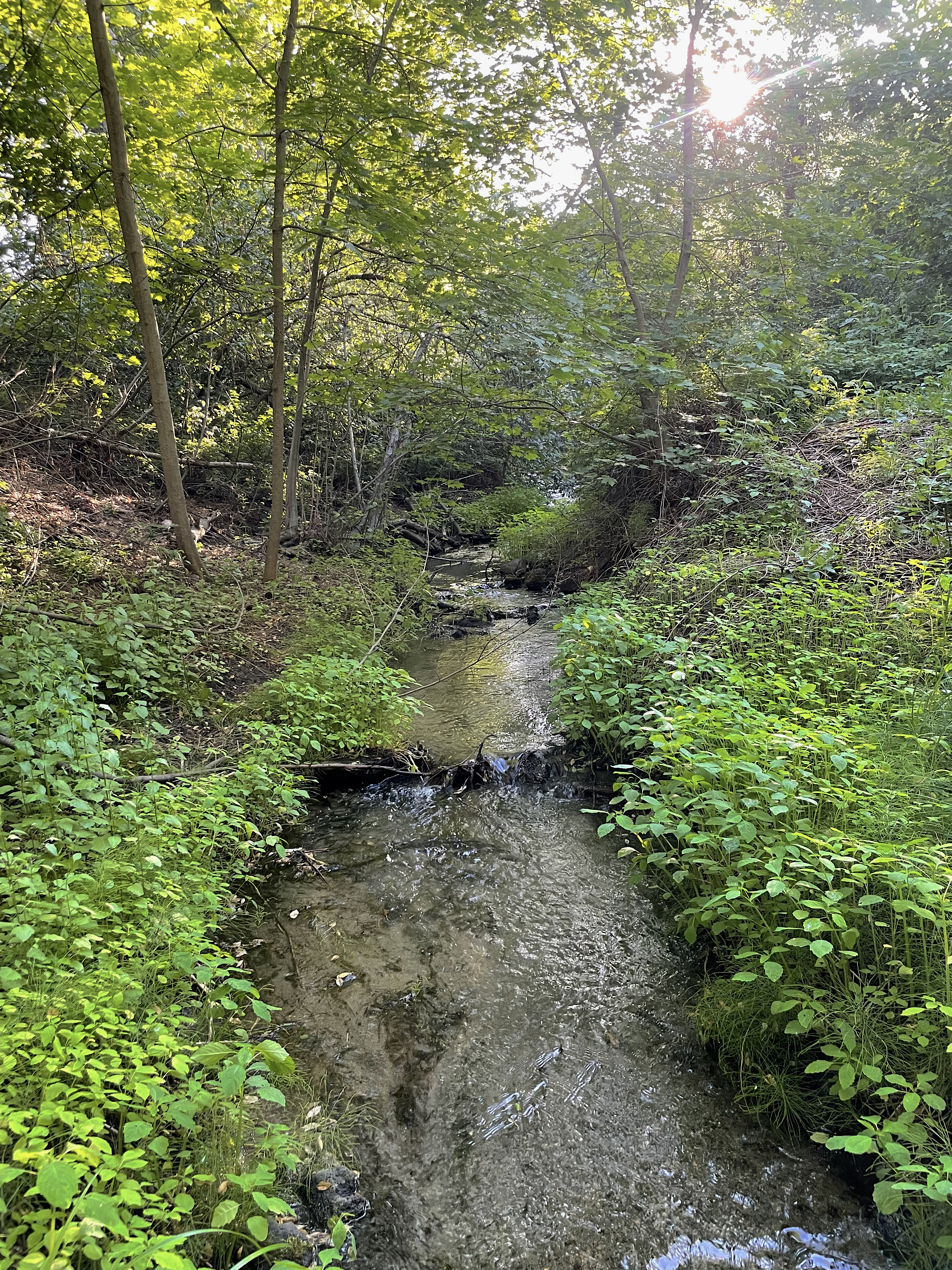
- Garden Springs Creek downstream of John A. Finch Arboretum

- Location of the mouth of Garden Springs Creek in Washington Garden Springs Creek (the United States)

Location
- Country: United States
- State: Washington
- County: Spokane
- City: Spokane

Physical characteristics
- Source
  - elevation: 2,160 ft (660 m)
- Mouth: Latah Creek
  - location: Latah/Hangman, Spokane, Washington
  - coordinates: 47°38′44.2″N 117°26′51.2″W
  - elevation: 1,740 ft (530 m)
- Length: 1.5 mi (2.4 km)

Basin features
- Progression: Latah Creek → Spokane River → Columbia River → Pacific Ocean
- River system: Columbia River

Garden Springs Creek is a stream of approximately 1.5 miles in length that flows through the West Hills neighborhood of Spokane, Washington into Latah Creek.

It begins in the Garden Springs area on the west side of the city and flows from the rim of the Columbia Plateau east down into the valley of Latah Creek, entirely within the city of Spokane and passing through John A. Finch Arboretum before flowing under Interstate 90 and U.S. Route 195 just above its confluence with Latah Creek at the 11th Avenue Bridge.

== Geography ==
Garden Springs Creek is a perennial stream that flows across the western portion of Spokane from the Garden Springs area of the West Hills neighborhood originating from springs and wetlands at the top of the basalt palisades cut by the much larger streams of Latah Creek and the Spokane River below and to the east. From these wetlands, which are located immediately north of Interstate 90 and south of U.S. Route 2 at approximately 2,270 feet above sea level, the stream comes together at the Rustle Road/Garden Springs Road exit of I-90.

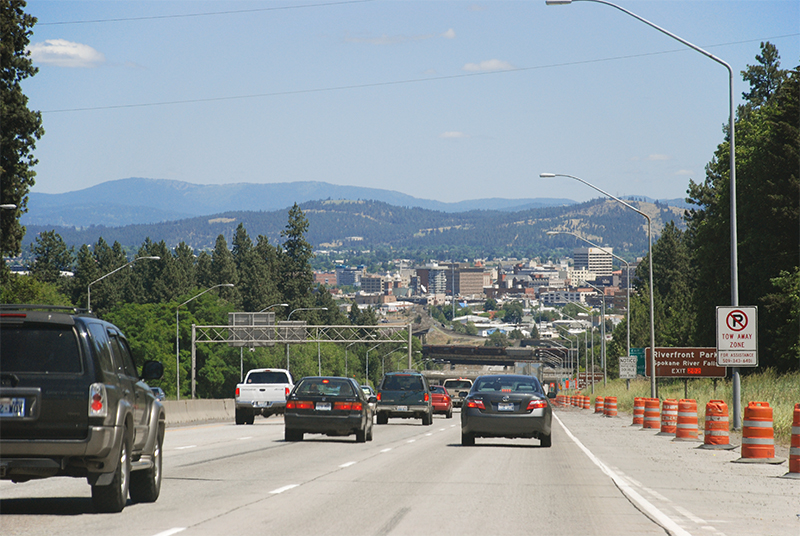
I-90 follows and ultimately crosses Garden Springs Creek as it descends into Spokane

From there the stream flows east, from the rim of the palisade down through Finch Arboretum before passing under I-90 and then U.S. 395 before entering into Latah Creek at the 11th Avenue Bridge, immediately south of High Bridge Park, in the Vinegar Flats section of the Latah/Hangman neighborhood. Its mouth at 1,740 feet above sea level is a drop of 420 feet over the roughly one-and-a-half-mile course of the stream.

After flowing through Finch Arboretum for approximately six-tenths of a mile, Garden Springs Creek then flows for a few blocks through a residential neighborhood. Woodland Boulevard follows the creek through the neighborhood along with the parallel Susie Stephens Trail. Garden Springs Creek enters a channelized tunnel under Interstate 90 just above the Rosamond Avenue overpass. The creek flows freely for a few blocks around 13th Avenue after emerging from the tunnel before entering a second tunnel to pass under Highway 195 and it remains channelized for the remainder of its journey to Latah Creek. Outside of the channels, the creek is impacted by the highways as I-90 follows its valley down from the west into Downtown Spokane.

== Ecology ==
Redband trout inhabit Garden Springs Creek. In 2013, the Washington state department of ecology made a grant of $154,000 to be used to help restore the stream to a more habitable home for redband trout. The project involved removal of bridges and culverts in Finch Arboretum as well as the planting of native plants like grasses and trees along the formerly manicured creek banks. The stream now flows naturally through Finch Arboretum.

== Gallery ==
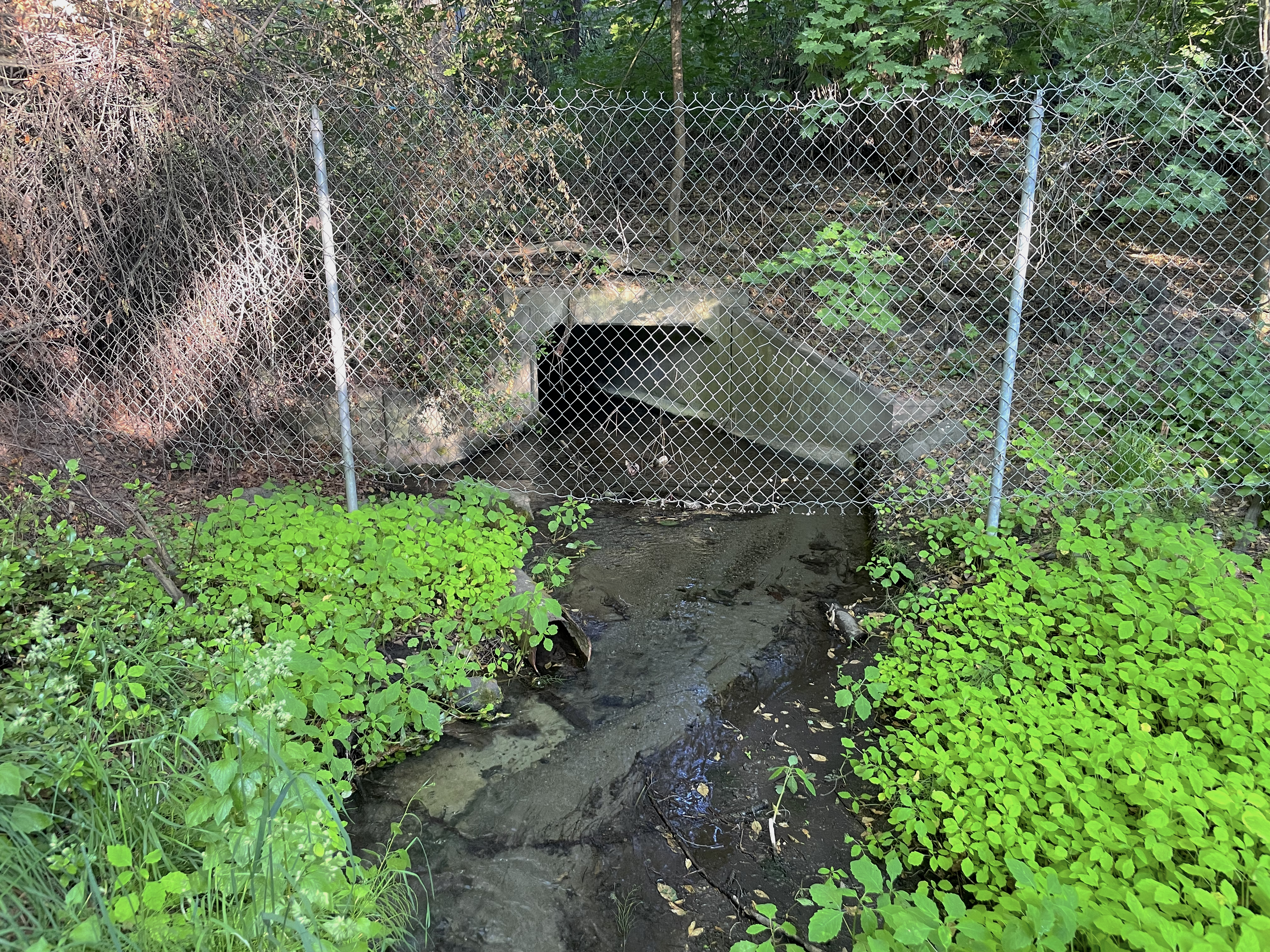
The creek entering the I-90 tunnel

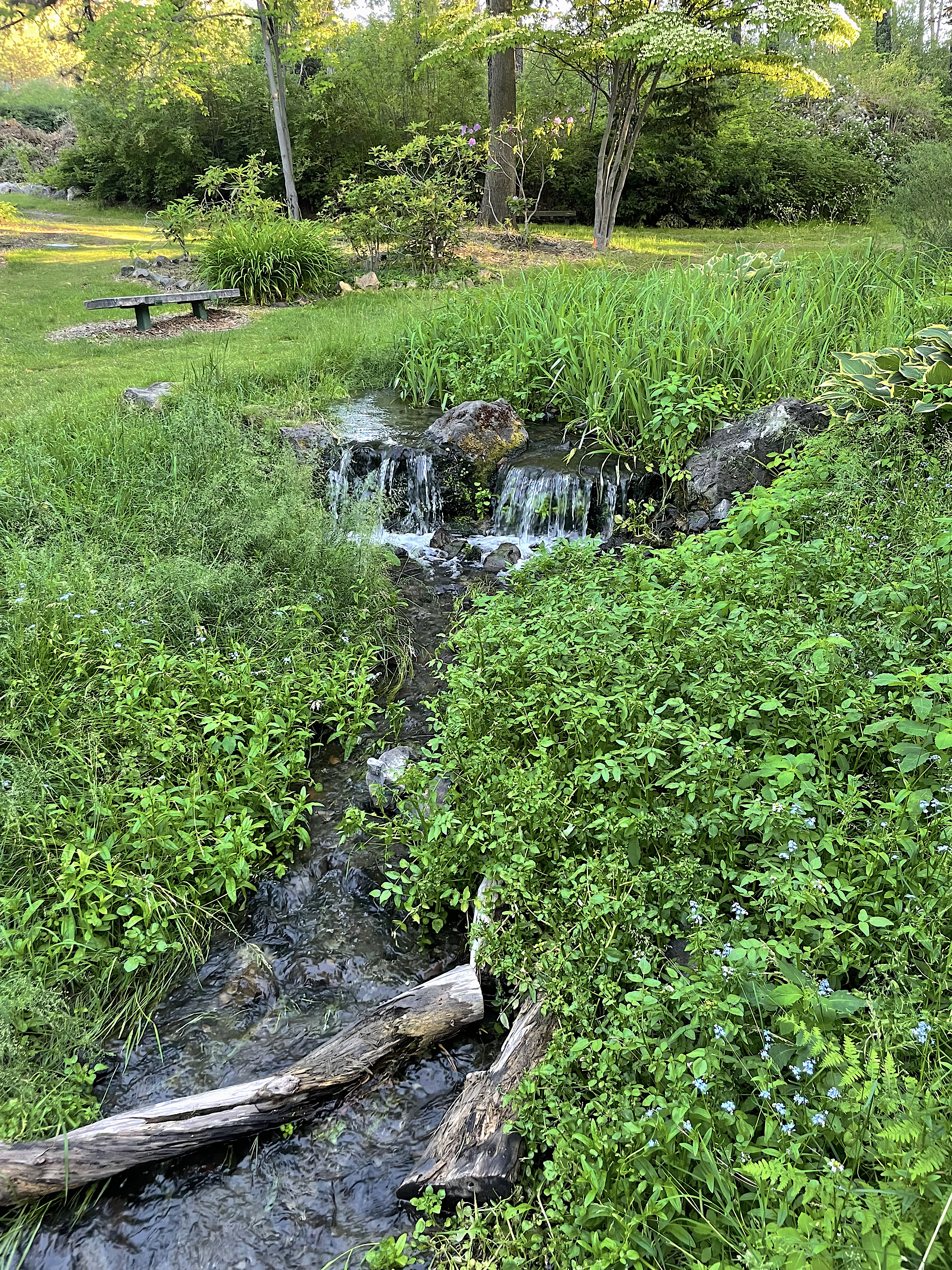
Small waterfall in the rhododendron garden at Finch Arboretum

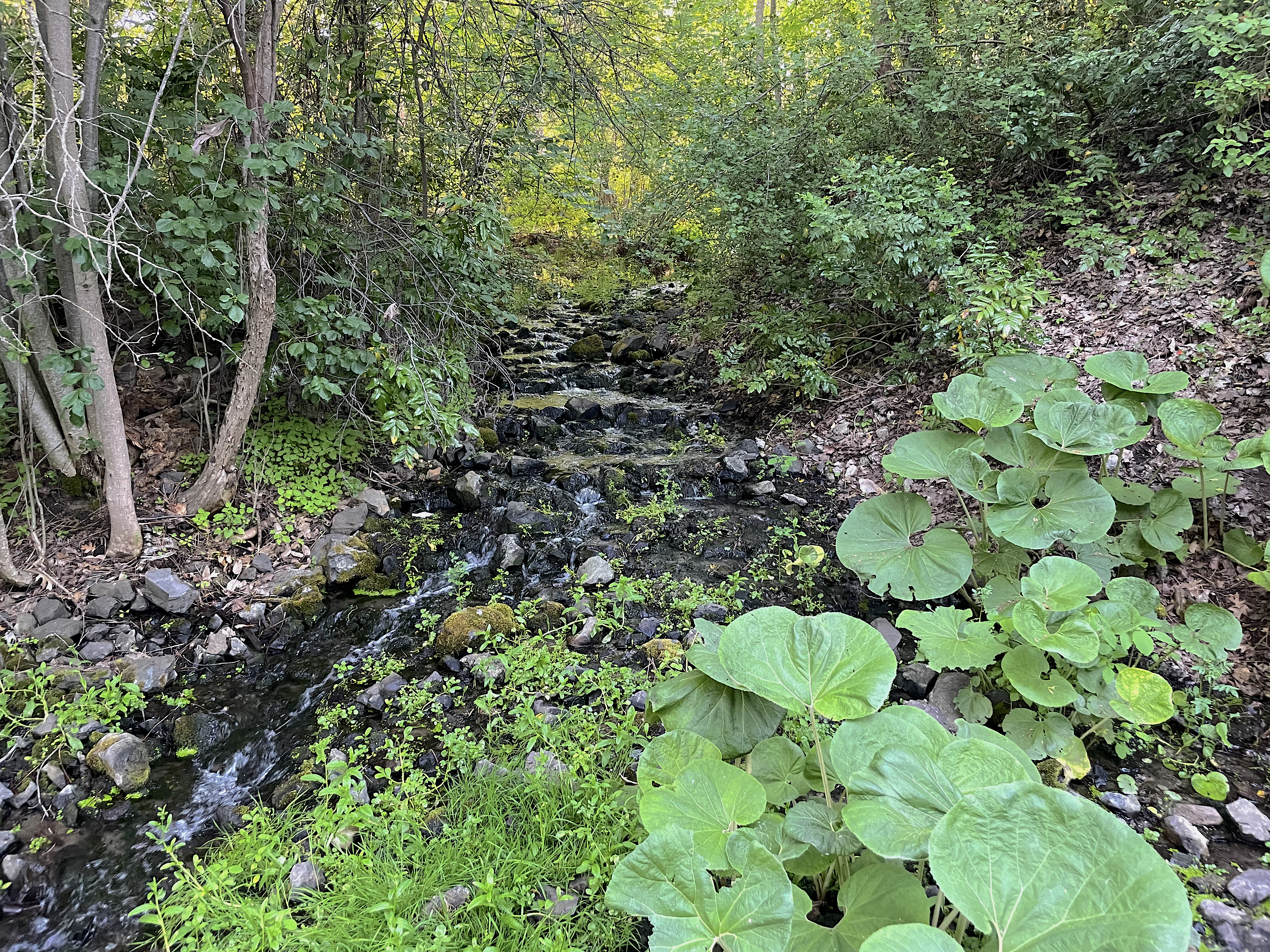
Splitting around a small island at Corey Glen in Finch Arboretum

== See also ==
- John A. Finch Arboretum
