= Sunset Boulevard Bridge =

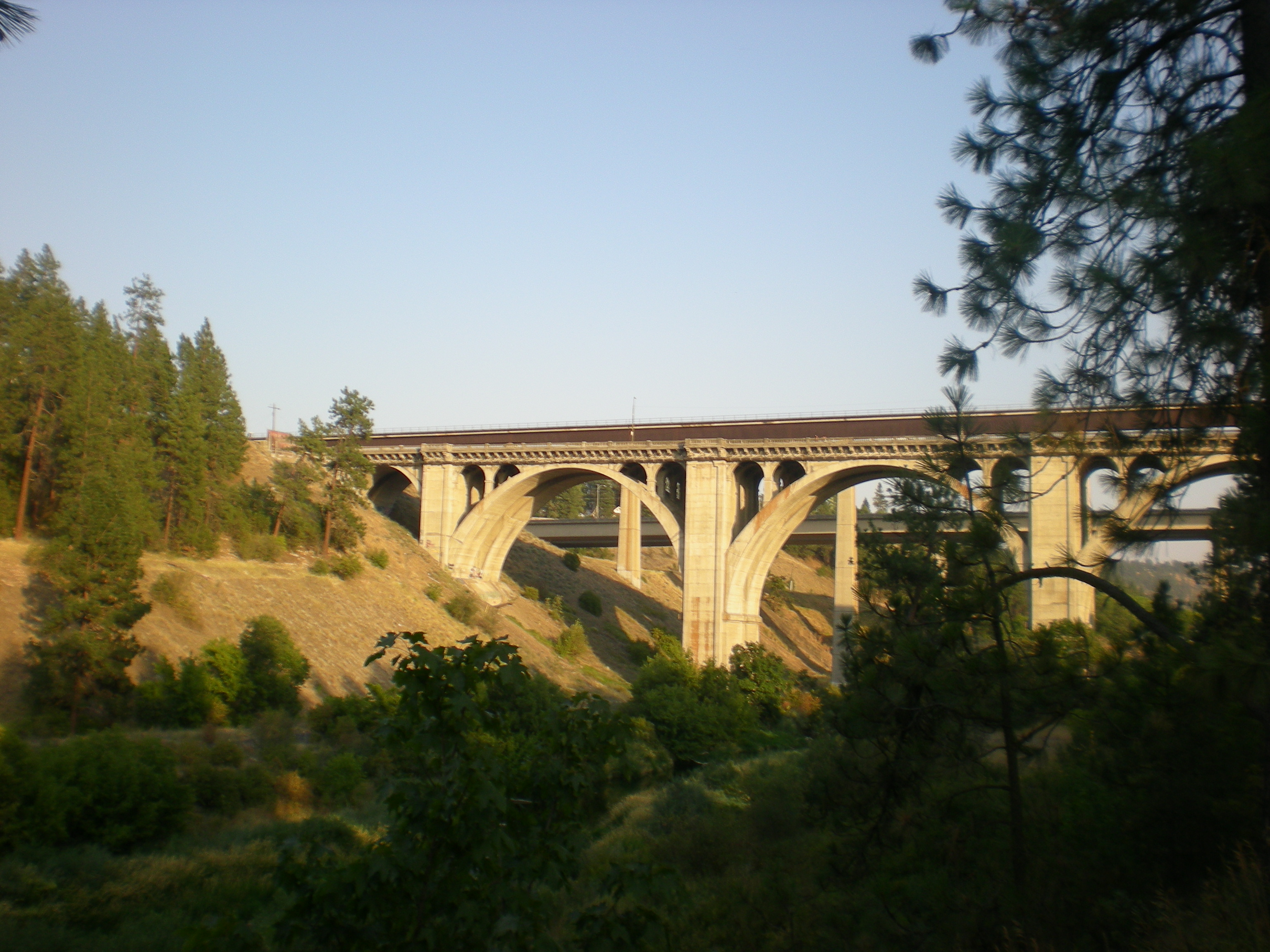
- View from northwest in 2008
- Coordinates: 47.6500°N 117.4480°W
- Carries: Sunset Boulevard
- Crosses: Latah Creek
- Locale: Spokane, Washington, U.S.
- Other name: Latah Creek Bridge
- Named for: Sunset Boulevard

Characteristics
- Design: Arch bridge
- Material: Reinforced concrete
- Total length: 1,070 ft (330 m)
- Width: 45 ft (14 m)
- Height: 64 ft (20 m)
- Longest span: 150 ft (45.7 m)

History
- Construction cost: $416,000 (1911)
- Opened: 1913

Location
- Interactive map of Sunset Boulevard Bridge

- Sunset Boulevard Bridge
- U.S. National Register of Historic Places
- Built: 1911
- Architect: Morton McCartney & J.F. Cunningham
- NRHP reference No.: 82004293
- Added to NRHP: July 16, 1982

The Sunset Boulevard Bridge, also known as the Latah Creek Bridge, is a deck arch bridge in the northwestern United States that spans Latah Creek in Spokane, Washington. The bridge connects the neighborhoods of Browne's Addition on the east, and Downtown Spokane just beyond that, with West Hills to the west. Latah Creek, which passes under the bridge, separates the two neighborhoods. It was built 115 years ago in 1911 by the city of Spokane, and was designed by Morton McCartney & J.F. Cunningham, with J.F. Greene serving as the construction engineer.

It is the northernmost of three bridges which cross Latah Creek in its immediate area. High Bridge is located to the south, and carries a BNSF railroad. Interstate 90 crosses Latah Creek just to the south of the rail bridge. All three pass over High Bridge Park, which takes its name from the bridges.

== History ==
Prior to the construction of the present Sunset Boulevard Bridge, a timber railroad trestle crossed Latah Creek at the same location. The old timber trestle was demolished, but the railroad leading to the bridge remained during construction, and was used to deliver the concrete to the construction site of the current bridge.

Construction began on the Sunset Boulevard Bridge in 1911, making it the second of Spokane's large, concrete arch bridges, after the shorter-in-length but taller Monroe Street Bridge. It was opened to traffic two years later in 1913.

The bridge would become seen as ahead of its time in terms of the traffic it would carry. It was built to handle highway level traffic in the earliest days of the automobile, long before highways were on the map. The Sunset Boulevard Bridge carried the Sunset Highway starting from the latter's opening in 1915. Sunset Highway was known by a number of official names, such as State Road No. 2, one of Washington's first highways to cross the state west-to-east, and later as U.S. Route 10. The bridge carried the primary west-to-east highway into Spokane, by many names and numbers, until the arrival of the Interstate Highway System. In 1963, the Sunset Boulevard Bridge was bypassed by the adjacent I-90 bridge, which carried the new interstate into and through the city.

As the bridge approached its 100th birthday, the City of Spokane commissioned a study from CH2M Hill on options for rehabilitating the bridge. The 2012 study cost $631,000, which was provided by federal grants. In the years prior to the study, deterioration on the bridge deck led the city to reduce the number of lanes from four to two. The study found that the bridge arches, particularly in the center where they were designed to carry rail traffic, were still strong. They determined the bridge was still safe, but that the deck would need to be replaced, similar to what was done to the Monroe Street Bridge a few years prior to the study.

In July 2023, the Spokane City Council approved a $64 million budget to make repairs to the aging bridge.

== Description ==
The Sunset Boulevard Bridge is a 1,070-foot long concrete arch bridge made up of seven semi-circular, or Roman, arches. The arches are of varying sizes, with the two largest spanning 150 feet in length, with 135-foot arches on either side of those, one 128-foot arch to the west, and a pair of 54-foot abutment arches on each end. Unlike Spokane's other large concrete arch bridge, the Monroe Street Bridge, which was constructed contemporaneously and used a flattened arch, the Sunset Boulevard Bridge was designed with semi-circular arches due to its specific setting. The semi-circular arches exert thrust in a way better suited for the large and heavier than usual piers required for the sandy ground along Latah Creek that they would be built upon. Each of the five main arches support four spandrel arches, while the two abutment arches have closed spandrels. These spandrels support the 45-foot roadway above, which was originally topped with ornamental pillars made of cast iron, though they were removed sometime before 2014. Steel for the structure was manufactured by the Lackawanna Steel Company and the concrete was supplied by the Inland Portland Cement Company.

The bridge carries two lanes of Sunset Boulevard, a primary arterial as classified by the city. It is the only arterial crossing Latah Creek and one of just two arterials crossing Latah Creek or the Spokane River, on the west side of the city. It connects the West Hills neighborhood on the west with Browne's Addition, and the city center, on the east.

== Gallery ==
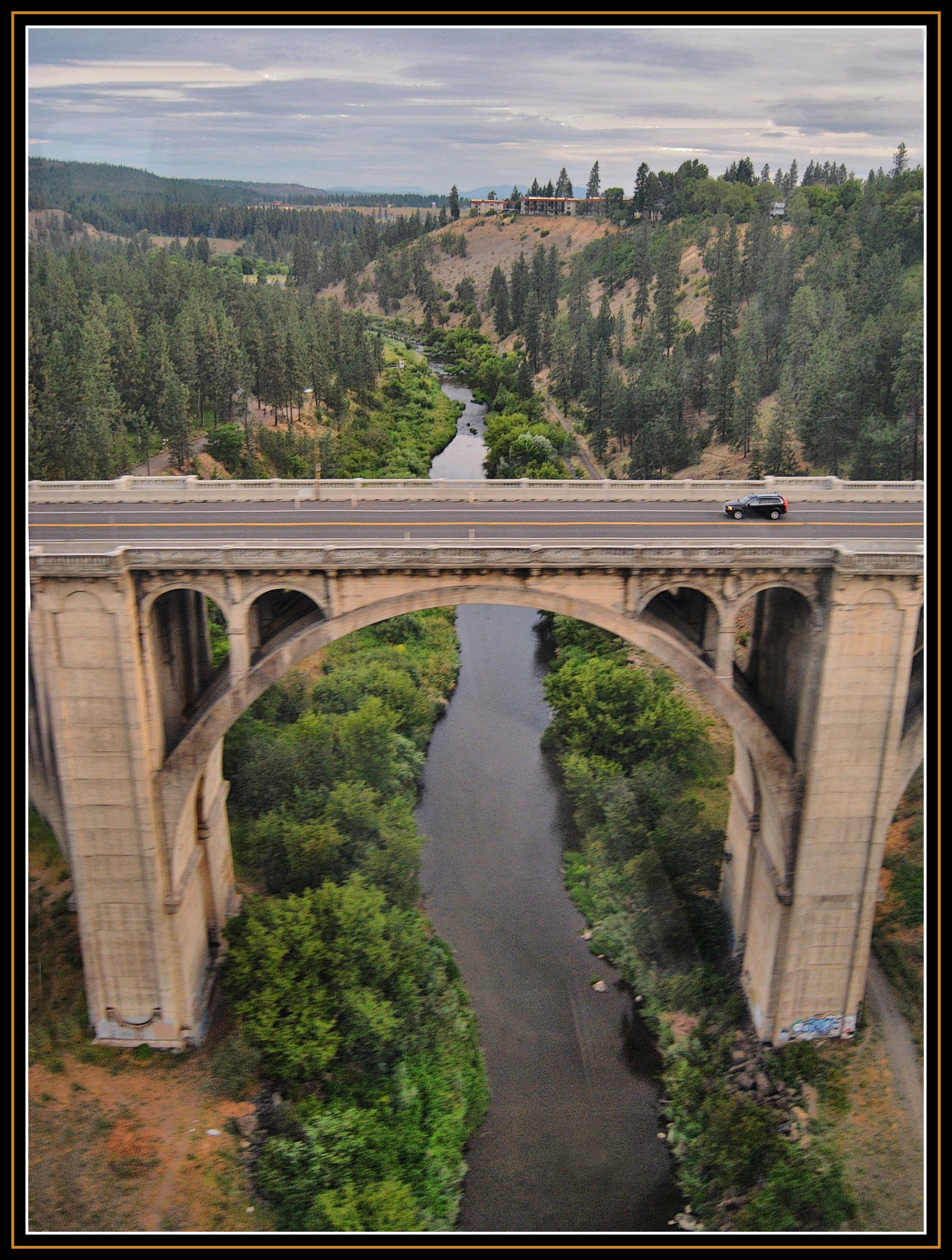
Sunset Boulevard Bridge from above on the rail bridge looking north.

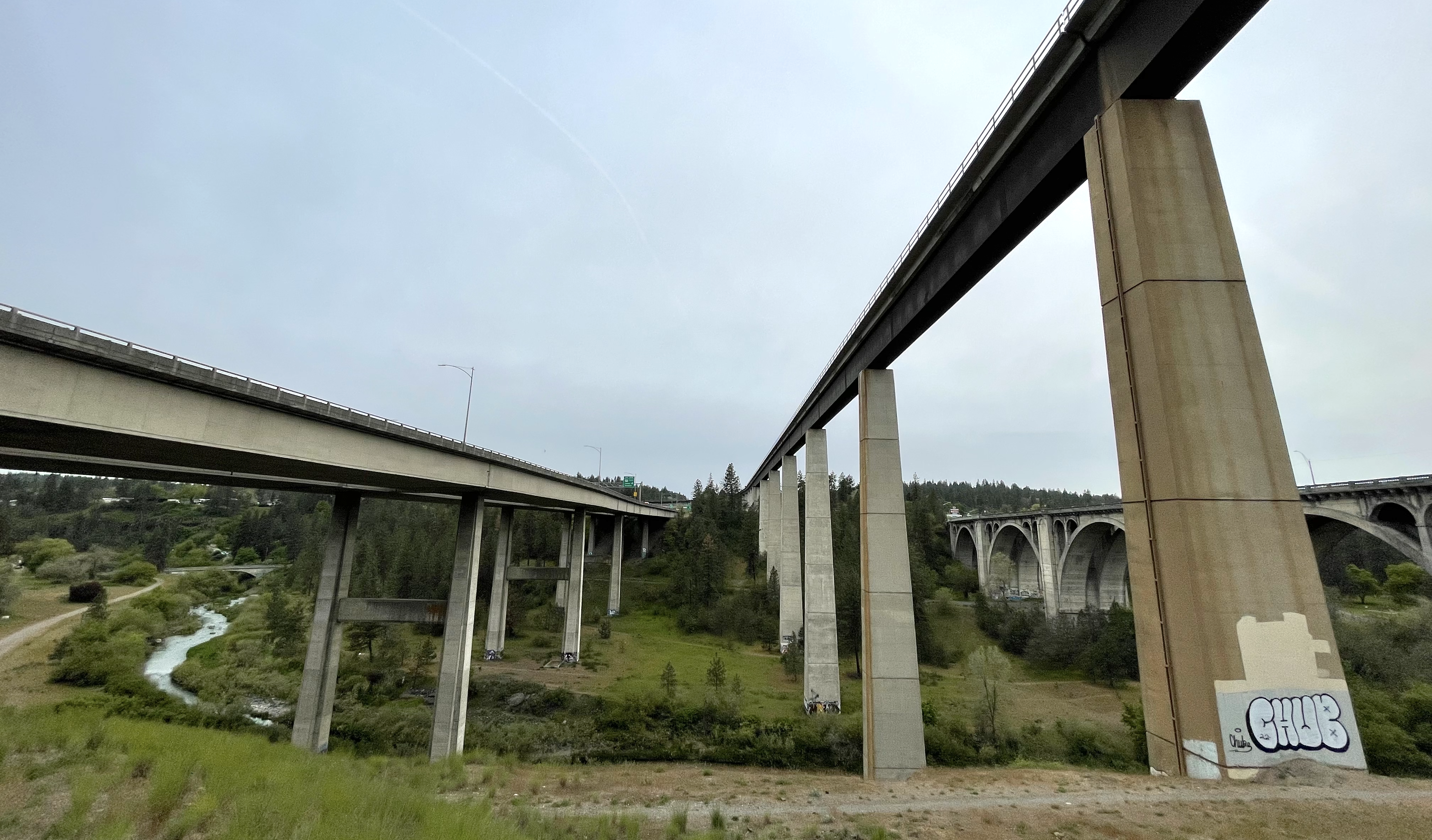
Sunset Boulevard Bridge on the far right, showing many of its Roman arches.

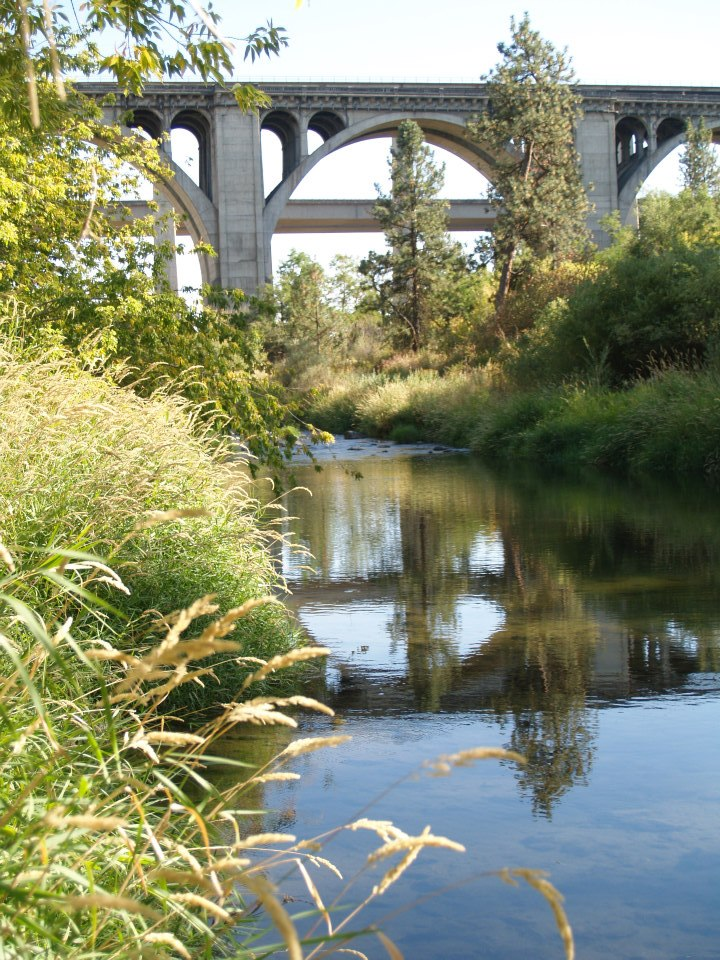
Sunset Boulevard Bridge looking south along Latah Creek.

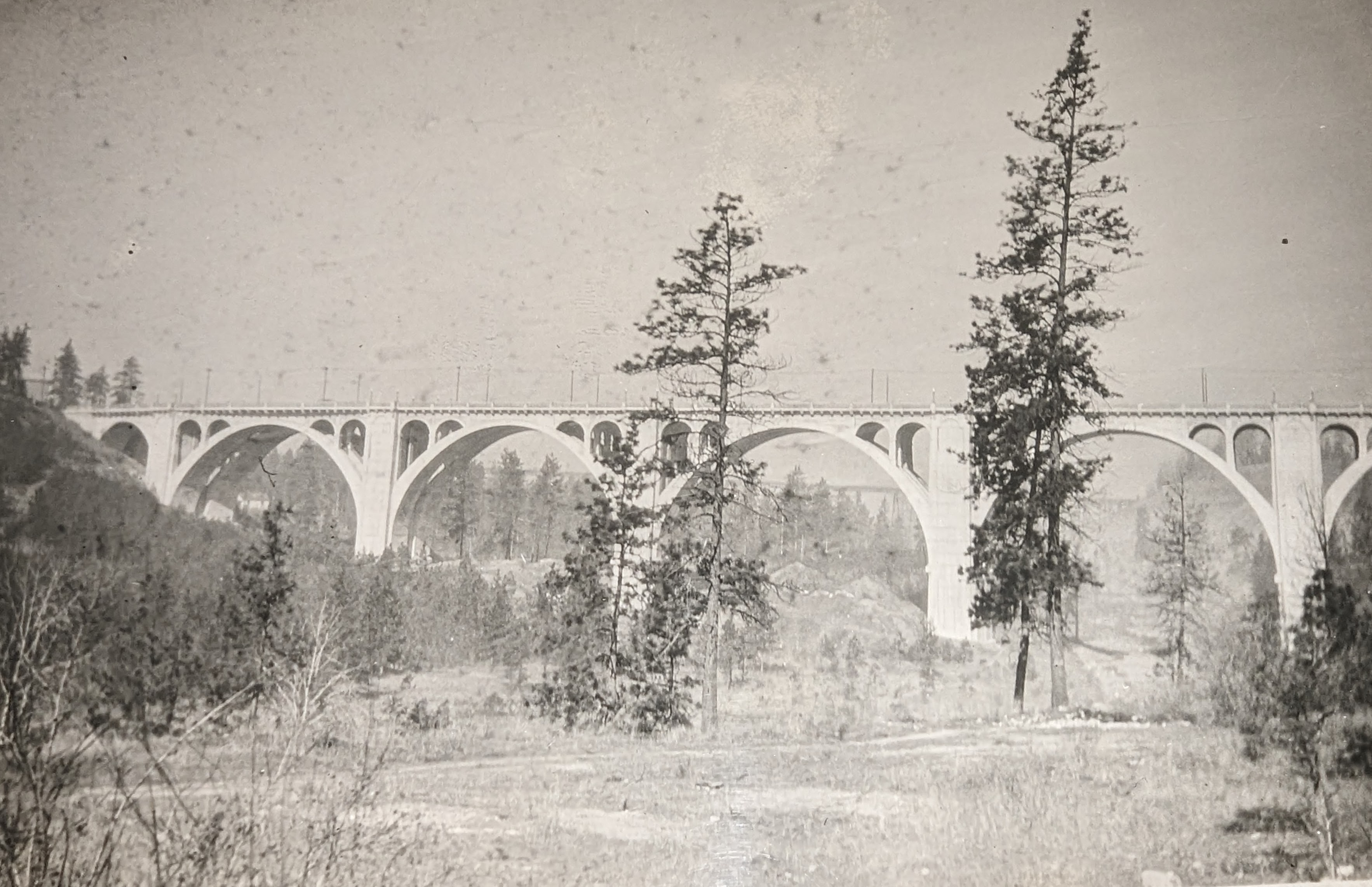
Sunset Boulevard Bridge, labeled as '17, from Grende family archive.
