= West Hills, Spokane =

West Hills
- Spokane Neighborhood
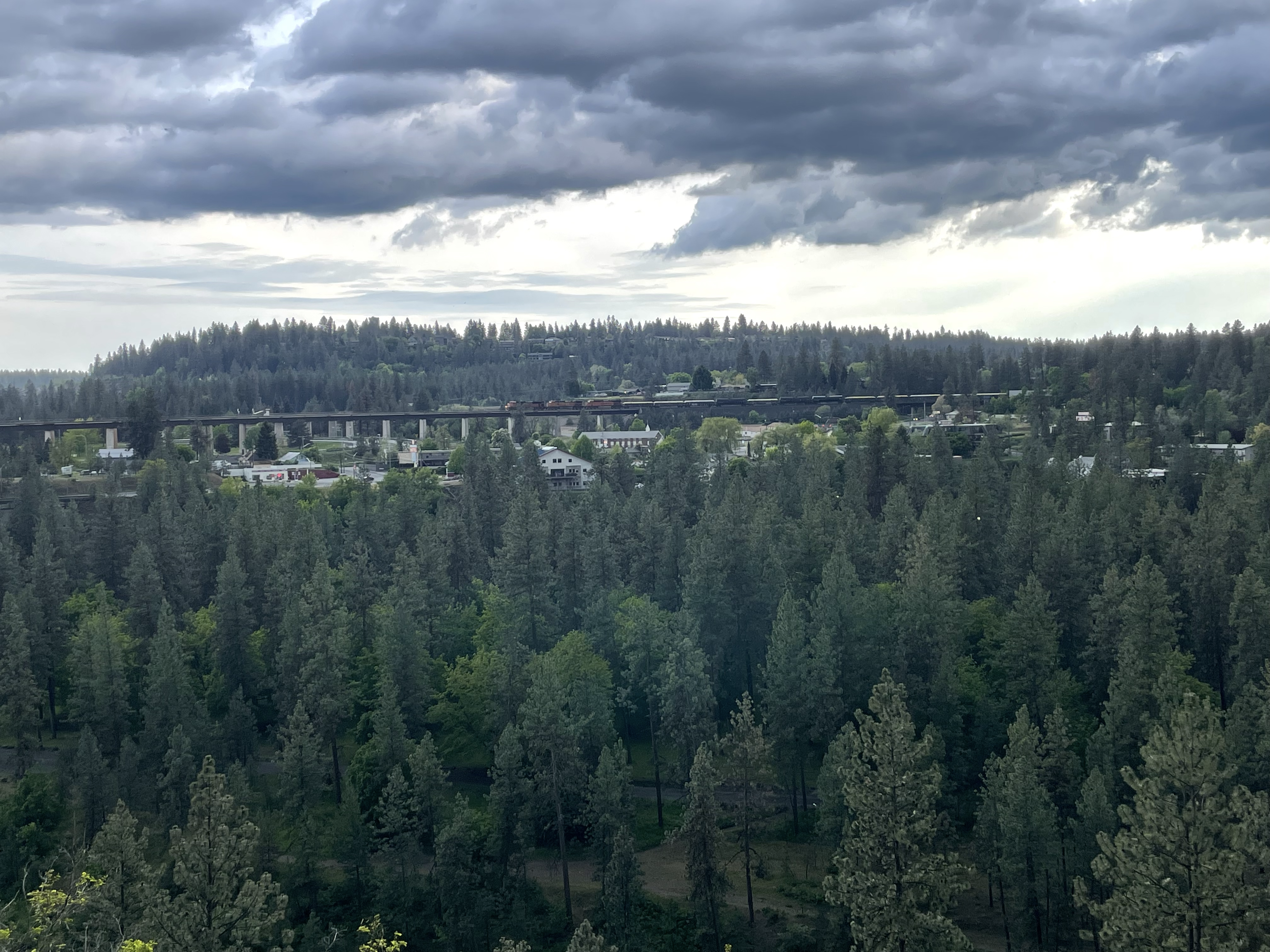
- Sunset Hill from Browne's Addition

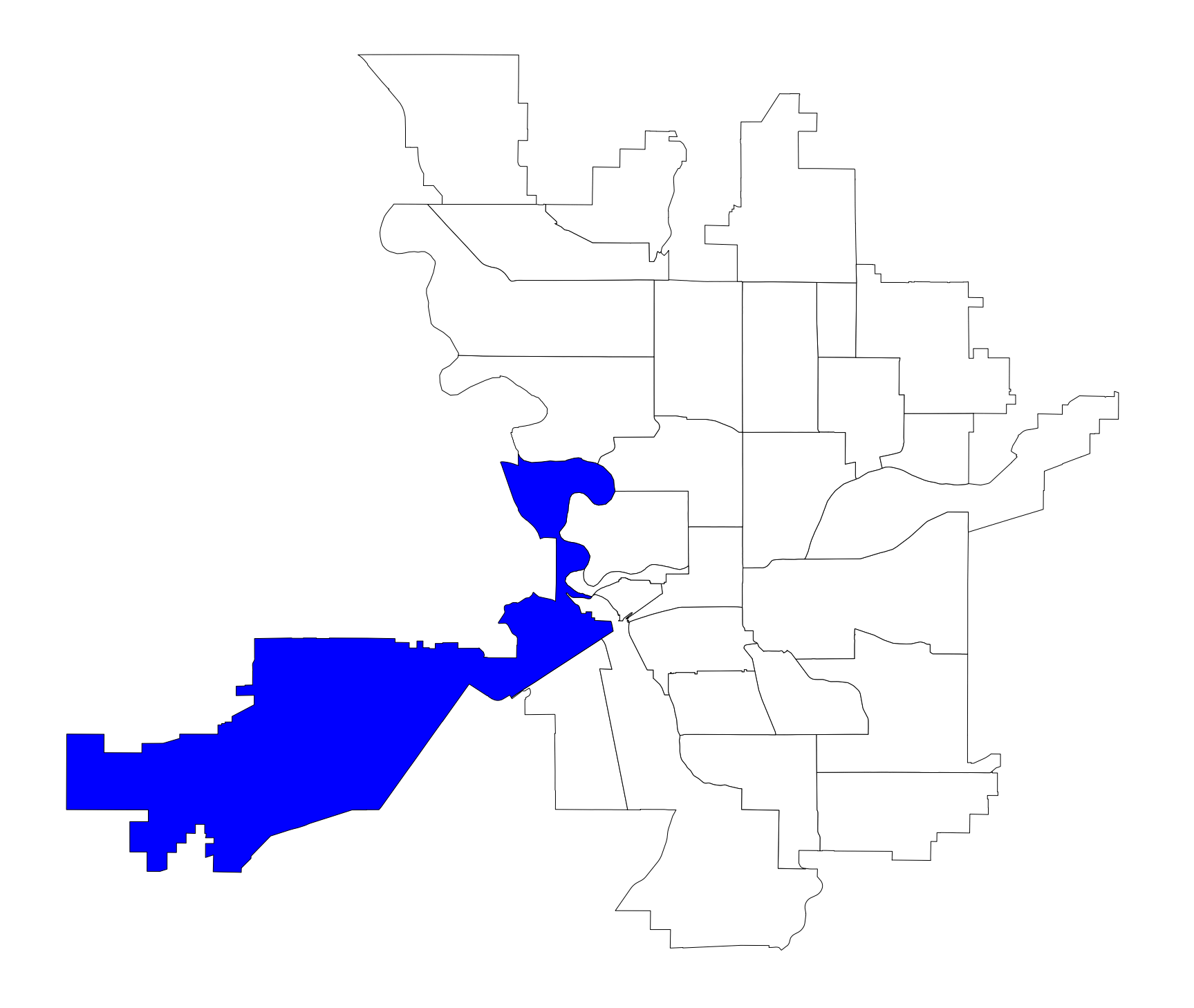
- Location within the city of Spokane
- Coordinates: 47°38′38.5″N 117°27′44.1″W
- Country: United States
- State: Washington
- County: Spokane
- City: Spokane

Population (2017)
  - Total: 3,690

Demographics 2017
  - White: 84.2%
  - Latinx: 6.1%
  - Asian: 4.1%
  - Black or African American: 2.7%
  - American Indian/Alaska Native: 2.6%
- Time zone: UTC-8 (PST)
  - Summer (DST): UTC-7 (PDT)
- ZIP Codes: 99224
- Area code: 509

West Hills is a neighborhood in Spokane, Washington. As the name suggests, the neighborhood is located on hillsides to the west of downtown Spokane. The neighborhood also extends far to the west along the West Plains to incorporate the Spokane International Airport and surrounding land. As the city has grown over the decades, the West Hills neighborhood has expanded uphill and onto the plains to the west. That history of incremental growth, combined with the hilly topography of the area cut by numerous watercourses, has broken up the neighborhood into multiple, distinct areas with swaths of undeveloped land mixed in between.

== History ==
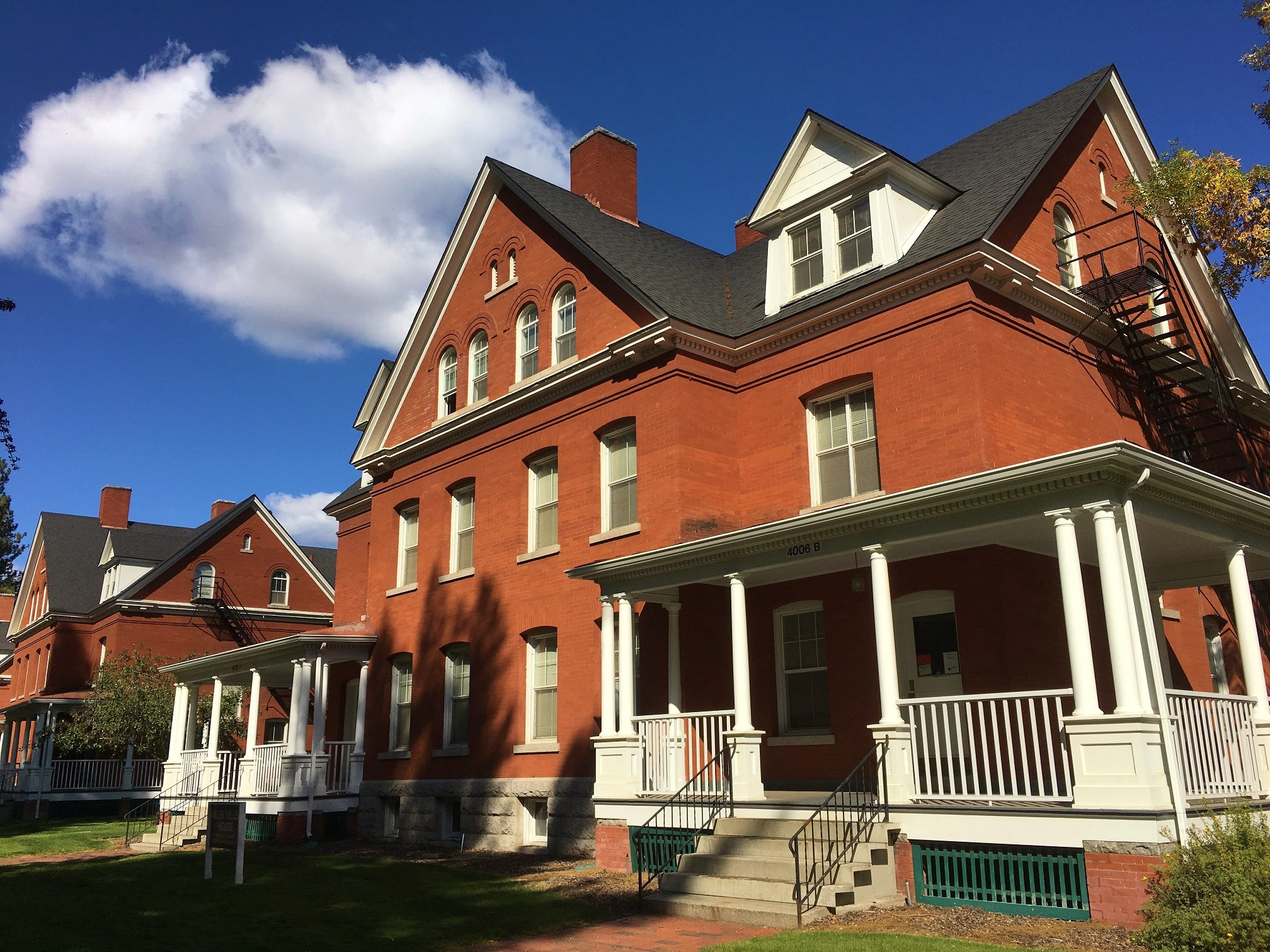
Historic buildings on the former campus of Fort George Wright

The Spokane people inhabited the area that is now West Hills for centuries before European settlers arrived. The land along the banks of Garden Springs Creek and Indian Canyon Creek were used as campsites and water sources for the Spokane. Chief Spokane Garry lived in Indian Canyon late in his life, until his death there in 1892. In the 1880s, Chinese immigrants replaced the Spokane along the banks of Garden Springs Creek in what is now Finch Arboretum, where they tended to vegetable gardens.

In 1891 the area west of H Street was incorporated into the City of Spokane. Just outside the municipal limit at the time, along a bend in the Spokane River, construction began on Fort George Wright in 1897 and was completed in 1899. Streetcars soon followed, connecting Fort George Wright through West Hills along Government Way, and climbing Sunset Boulevard to the crest of the hill. When the Olmsted Brothers came to Spokane in 1913 to design the city's park system they praised Indian Canyon Park for its beauty, and the land that would become the Finch Arboretum was purchased that same year.

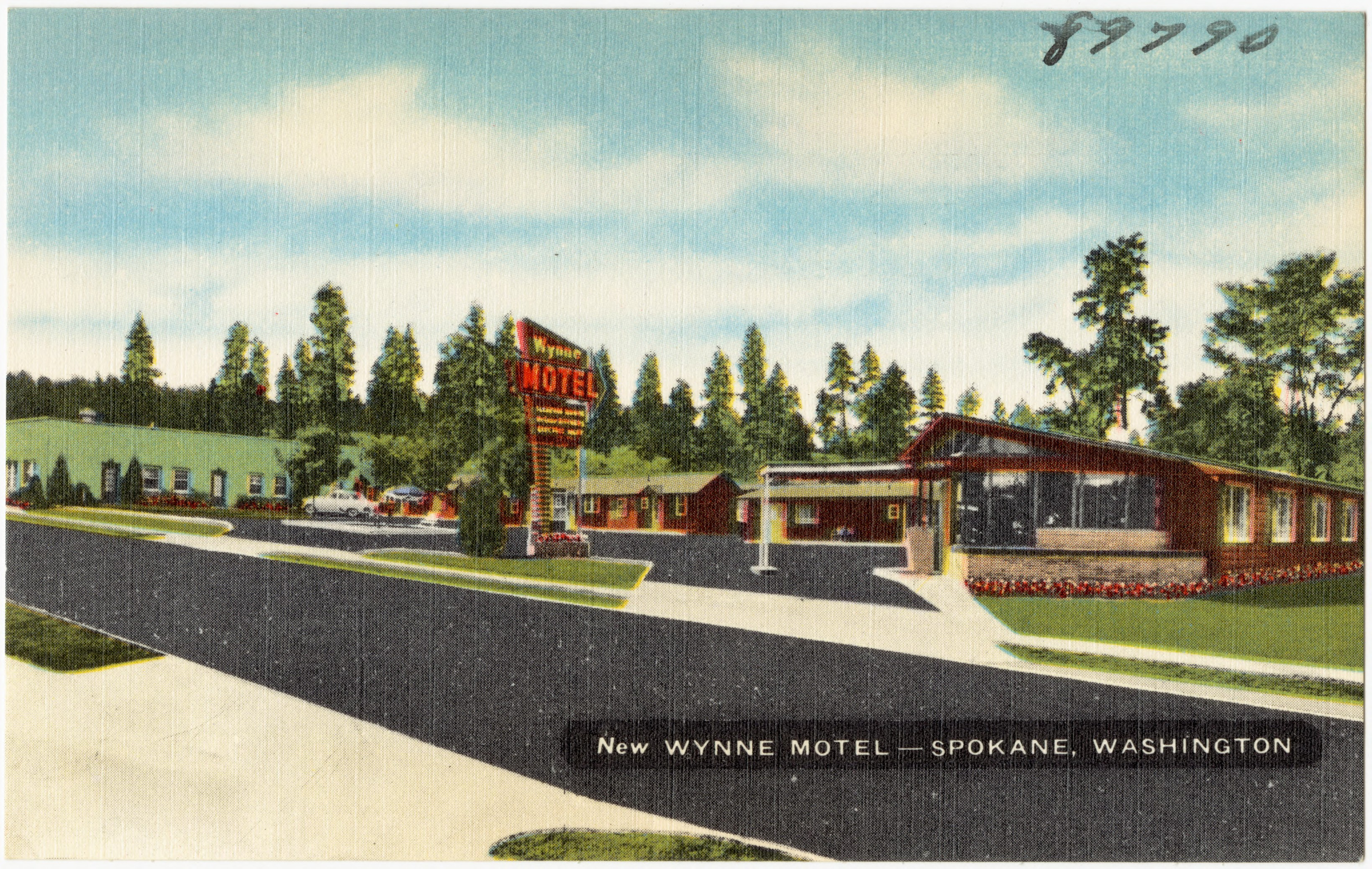
New Wynne Motel between 1930 and 1945

West Hills became a regional transportation hub with the construction of the first automobile bridge over the deep Latah Creek gorge in 1911, when the Sunset Boulevard Bridge was built. It connected Downtown Spokane with agricultural areas to the west via West Hills along Sunset Boulevard. In 1926, the Sunset Boulevard Bridge was chosen to carry U.S. Route 10, one of the first major east–west highways across the northern tier of the country. Numerous motels and campgrounds were developed in the area just west of the bridge at the base of Sunset Hill. A tourist camp was established at what is now High Bridge Park and along Sunset Boulevard itself motels were developed. Many stand to this day, though few remain operational. The area's importance in transportation waned in the 1960s as Interstate 90 was constructed roughly parallel to the Sunset Highway. U.S. Route 10 replaced by the limited-access freeway, which passes next to but does not have off or on ramps connecting directly to the motel district. In the decades since, hotels and motels have been developed at the top of the hill, on the western edge of the neighborhood, where there are ramps connecting West Hills to the interstate.

Spokane Falls Community College was opened on the property of Fort George Wright in 1967. In 1990, also on the property of Fort George Wright, the U.S. Campus of Mukogawa Women's University was opened. Many of the historic buildings from Fort Wright remain in use on the Mukogawa campus.

From 1891 when parts of West Hills were first incorporated into the city until 1948 the western border of the city through the area was delineated by a north–south line running roughly along H Street. Westward expansion of the city took off during the post-World War II housing boom. In 1948 a couple of blocks just west of H Street by Whittier Park was annexed, and by the mid-1960s most of the area in the southern portion of the neighborhood from H Street west to the crest of Sunset Hill had been annexed. Fort George Wright in the north was annexed in 1966. A pair of areas were annexed in the 1990s, bringing the western portion of the neighborhood to its current size. The bounds of the neighborhood grew substantially in 2012 when the airport and surrounding areas were annexed into the city and named part of West Hills.

== Geography ==
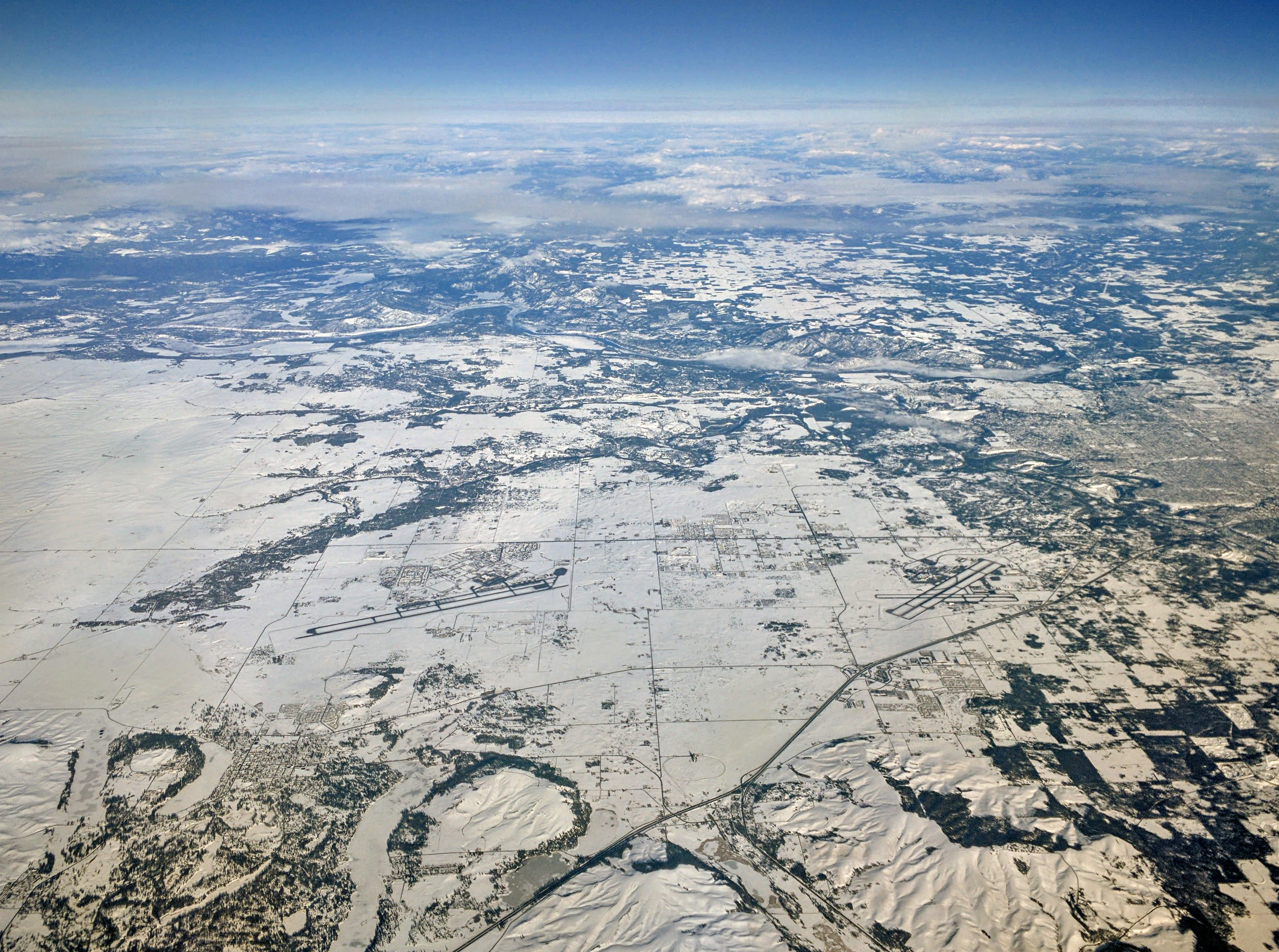
Aerial of the flat West Plains to the west of Spokane with Fairchild AFB (left) and Spokane International (right)

West Hills is located to the west of Spokane's city center, about a mile from the downtown core. It is somewhat cut off from the rest of the city by the deep valleys cut by Latah Creek and the Spokane River along its eastern edge. Furthermore, the neighborhood is bisected small streams like Garden Springs Creek, which cuts a valley through which Interstate 90 and the Sunset Highway pass, and Indian Canyon Creek, which cuts a rugged valley just to the north. These streams are fed by numerous wetlands which are located atop the crest of the neighborhood's eponymous hill.

The easternmost portion of the neighborhood lies roughly at the same elevation as much of the rest of the city of Spokane to the east, being located on a bench above Latah Creek and the Spokane River. From there, as one travels to the west, the elevation rises from between 1,800 and 1,900 feet to 2,300 feet. The elevated portions of the neighborhood are at the level of the surrounding Columbia Plateau which stretches to the west into Central Washington. There is much exposed Basalt rock in the neighborhood along the bluffs and canyons of West Hills. The slopes themselves are heavily forested, even adjacent and into residential areas. While on the West Plains atop the hill the area begins to open up into the Channeled Scablands with wetlands and meadows interspersed large basalt outcroppings trending in a northeast–southwest direction.

West Hills straddles the boundary between two ecoregions as defined by the World Wildlife Fund. The lower and easternmost portions of the neighborhood, like almost all of the rest of the city, lie within the Okanagan dry forests ecoregion, which stretches from just south of Spokane northwest through the Okanagan and into the Thompson Plateau of British Columbia. Tall ponderosa pine trees are a remnant of the pre-development nature of the ecoregion. Beyond the crest of the hill the Okanagan dry forests transition into the Palouse grasslands.

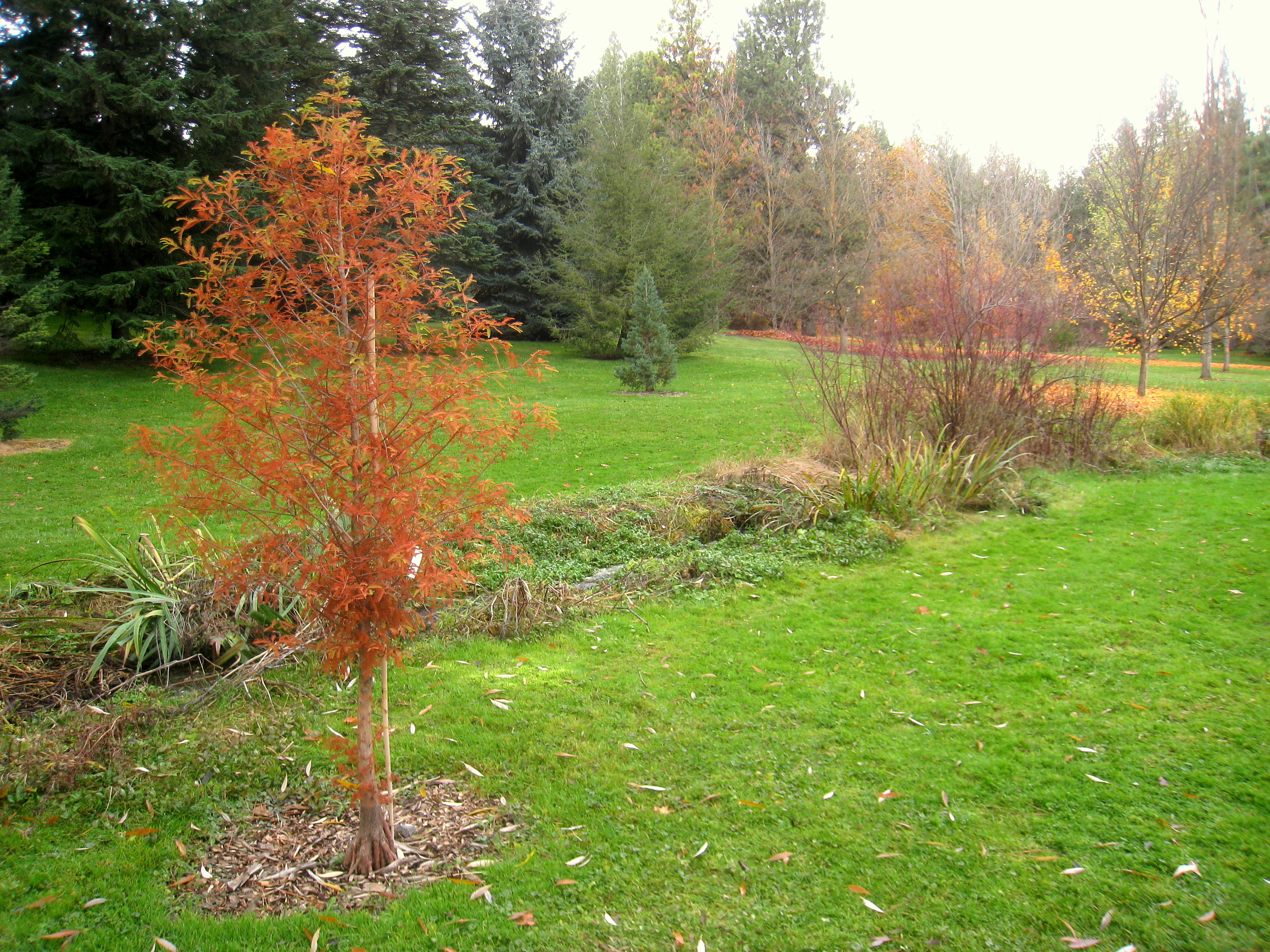
Garden Springs Creek in Finch Arboretum

In the north of the neighborhood, surrounded on three sides by a bend of the Spokane River, is the site of Fort George Wright. The former army base is now home to Spokane Falls Community College and the Mukogawa Women's University's U.S. Campus. Just to the south of the campuses is the River Run residential area, with both single-family and apartment homes, which has been developed over the first decades of the 21st century.

A cluster of large cemeteries separates the northern portion of the neighborhood with the older residential areas in the south.

The southern portion of the neighborhood, from I-90 on the south to the cemeteries in the north, is commonly known as Sunset Hill. There is a commercial district along Sunset Boulevard here, as well as single-family residential neighborhoods and abundant parkland. Whittier Park, a neighborhood park with a playground and sports facilities, is located in this part of West Hills, as are the much larger John A. Finch Arboretum along Garden Springs Creek and the public Indian Canyon Golf Course.

== Demographics ==
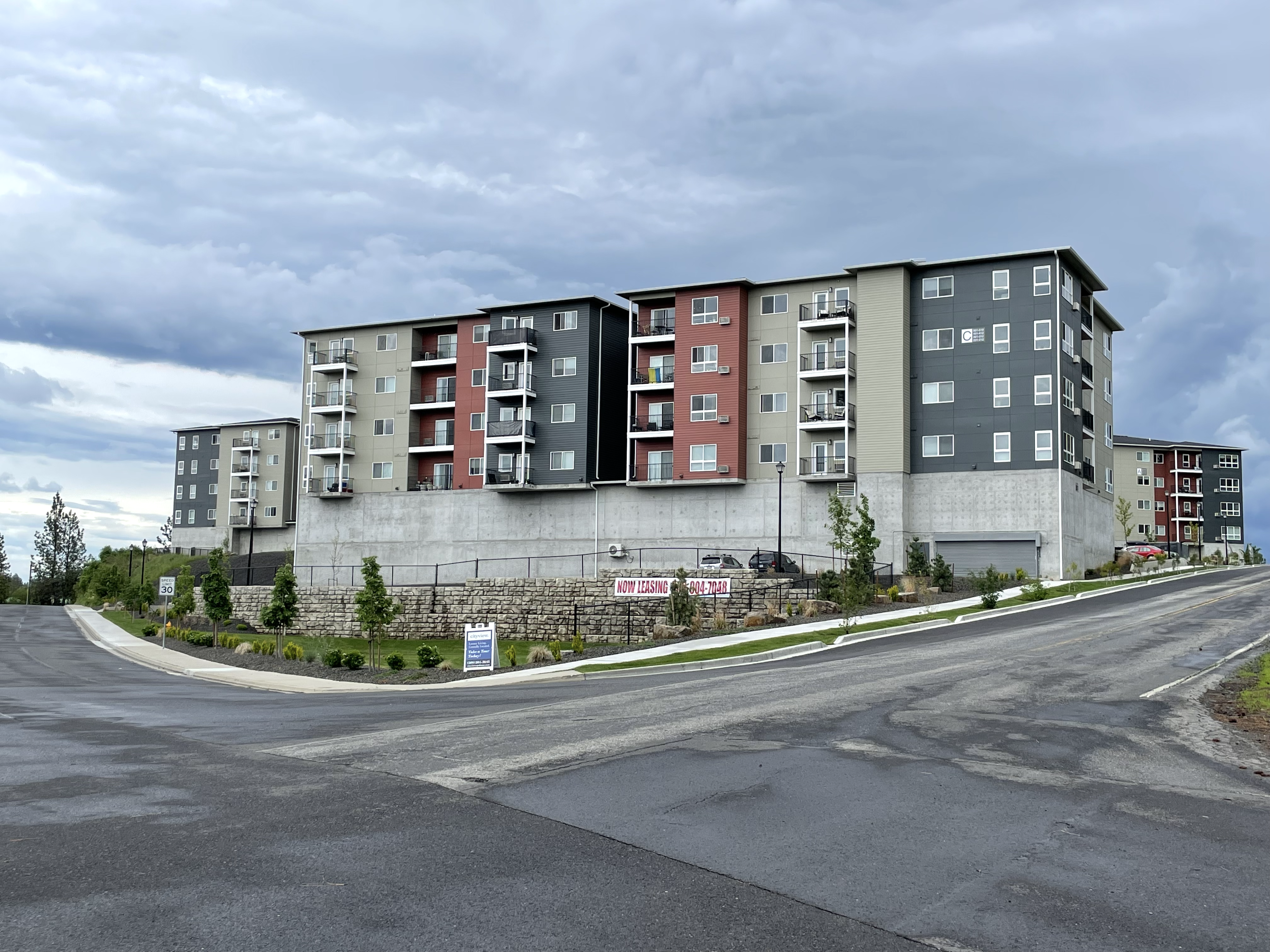
Apartments at the top of Sunset Hill

As of 2017, West Hills was home to 3,690 people across 1,708 households, of which 18.1% had children. 58.8% of households in the neighborhood were rentals, compared with 45.3% citywide. Persons aged 19 or younger made up 20.4% of the population, compared to 21.9% citywide, and persons aged 65 and above made up 10.9% of the population, compared to 14.5% citywide. $46,458 was the median household income, compared to $44,768 citywide. 28.7% of students qualified for free or reduced lunch, below the citywide average of 54.5%. Persons of color made up 17.9% of the population, compared to 15.1% citywide.

89.4% of residents were born in the United States or its territories. Of those who weren't, 13.9% were from Mexico, 13.4% from Iraq, 9.6% from Saudi Arabia and 5.9% from Canada.

== Education ==
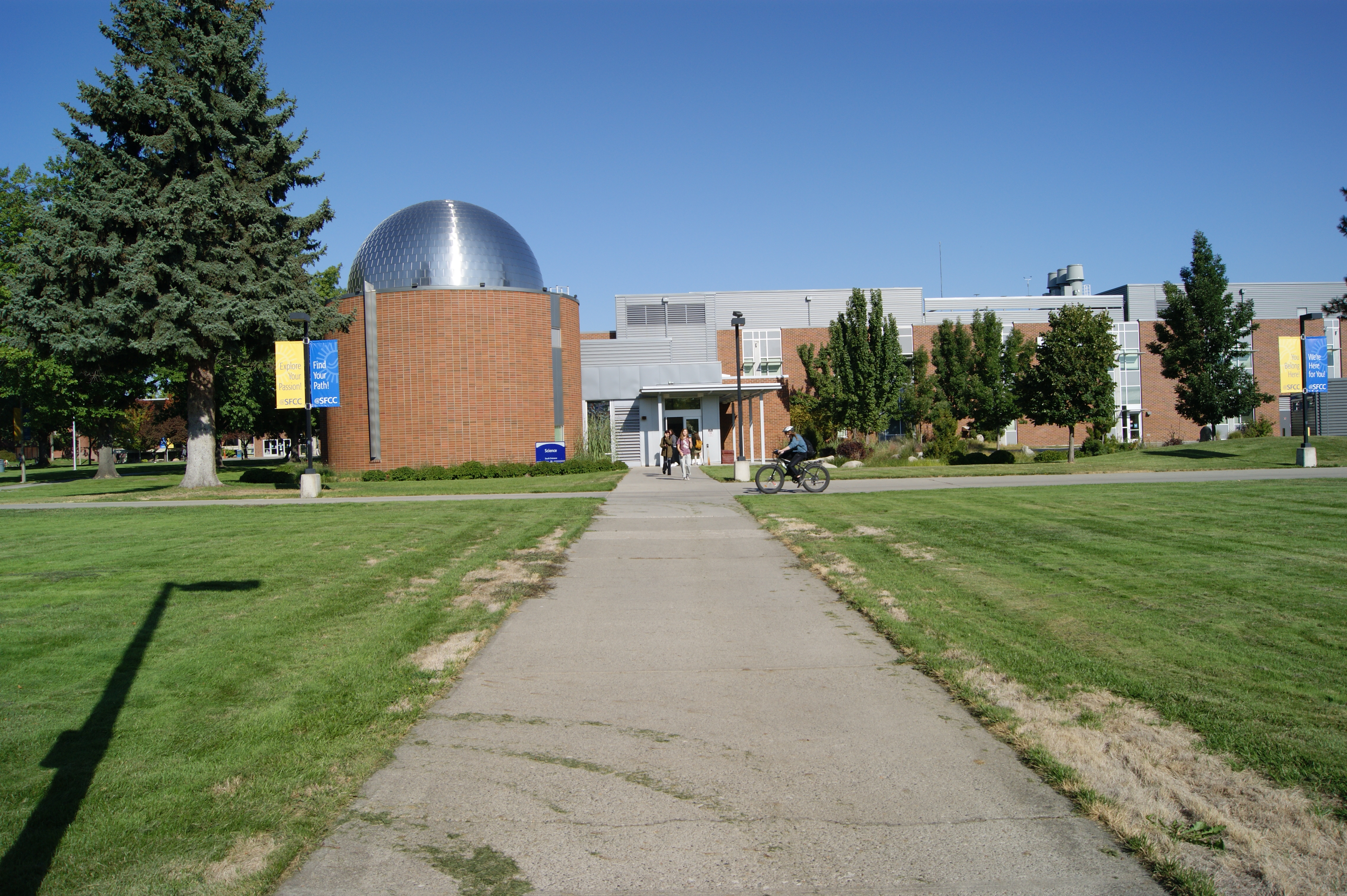
SFCC's Science building and planetarium

The West Hills neighborhood is home to Spokane Falls Community College (SFCC), a public higher education institution, and the U.S. Campus of Mukogawa Women's University, a private university with its main campus located in Spokane's sister city of Nishinomiya, Japan. There are no primary or secondary schools located within the neighborhood.

Areas south of Indian Canyon Creek are part of the Hutton Elementary School district, located in the Rockwood neighborhood. Areas to the north are part of the Finch Elementary School district, located in the Audubon/Downriver neighborhood. The Finch district in West Hills is contiguous with the rest of the Finch district, though separated from it by the Spokane River, though the Hutton district in the neighborhood does not touch any of the rest of the Hutton district. Through the 2022 school year, the Hutton district areas of the neighborhood fed into Sacajawea Middle School, like the rest of the Hutton district, but starting in the 2022-23 year they will feed instead to the new Carla Peperzak Middle School being constructed on the southern edge of Spokane, and from there into Lewis and Clark High School. The Finch district feeds into Glover Middle School and North Central High School.

Areas that were part of the 2012 annexation, such as the airport and West Plains, are not part of the Spokane Public Schools district but rather the Cheney School District.

== Transport ==
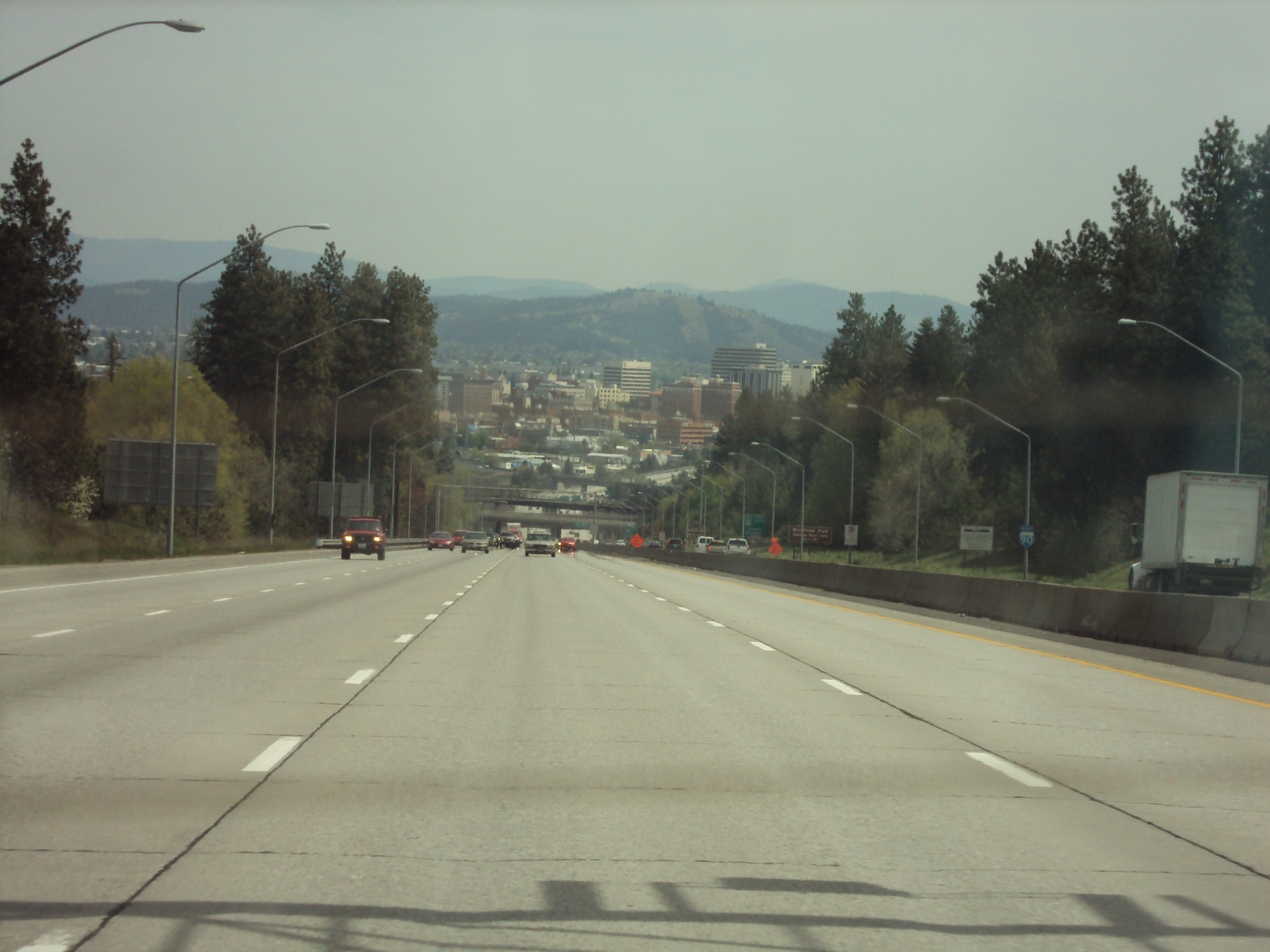
Interstate 90 looking northeast to Spokane with the West Hills to the left

=== Interstate ===
- - Interstate 90 - to Coeur d'Alene (east) and Seattle (west)

=== Highway ===
- - U.S. 2 - to Newport (east) and Wenatchee (west)
- - U.S. 195 - to Pullman (south)
- - U.S. 395 - to Colville (north) and Ritzville (south)

=== Surface Streets ===
Sunset Highway is classified as a principal arterial by the city, as is Airport Drive (which serves the airport). In the north, Whistalks Way is also classified as a principal arterial. U.S. 2 is a limited-access roadway through the eastern portion of the neighborhood, sharing a roadway with Interstate 90 in this area. From just past the Airport off-ramp heading westbound, however, U.S. 2 becomes a surface street and is considered to be a principal arterial in this section. Geiger Boulevard and Government Way are considered minor arterials.

The southeastern portion of West Hills, on the shelf above the Spokane River and Latah Creek, is part of the city street grid. Southwest of H Street and Hartson Avenue the streets bend around the bluffs and cliffs as they climb Sunset Hill. Due to the terrain and waterways, even the part of the neighborhood on the street grid is relatively disconnected from the rest of the city. Only Whistalks Way, Riverside at Government Way, and Sunset Boulevard provide surface access directly into the rest of the city.

Non-motorized vehicles and pedestrians have access to the Fish Lake Trail, which as of 2022 has its northern terminus in West Hills one block from the major intersection of Government Way and Sunset Boulevard. It connects south through the Grandview/Thorpe neighborhood and is planned to extend roughly 10 miles to Fish Lake south of Marshall, where it would meet the Columbia Plateau Trail. Also as of 2022, there are plans in the works to extend the trail north through West Hills to connect it to the Spokane River Centennial Trail.

=== Public Transit ===
West Hills, like the rest of the Spokane urban area, is served by the Spokane Transit Authority. There are five scheduled-service bus lines serving the neighborhood.

Route	Termini			Service operation and notes	Streets traveled
20; SFCC	Downtown Spokane; STA Plaza	↔	Spokane Falls Community College; Spokane Falls Station	High-frequency route	Government Way, Whistalks Way
33; Wellesley	Spokane Community College; SCC Transit Center	↔	Spokane Falls Community College; Spokane Falls Station	High-frequency route	Whistalks Way
60; Airport via Browne's Addition	Downtown Spokane; STA Plaza	↔	Spokane International Airport	Basic-frequency route	Sunset Boulevard, Sunset Highway/Highway 2, Airport Way
61; Hwy 2 via Browne's Addition	Downtown Spokane; STA Plaza	↔	Fairchild Air Force Base	Basic-frequency route	Sunset Boulevard, Sunset Highway/Highway 2
63; Airway Heights/West Plains	West Plains; West Plains Transit Center	↔	Airway Heights	Basic-frequency route	Electric Avenue, Flightline Boulevard, Spotted Road, Airport Way, Flint Road, Sunset Highway/Highway 2
