= Latah Creek =

Latah Creek Hangman Creek
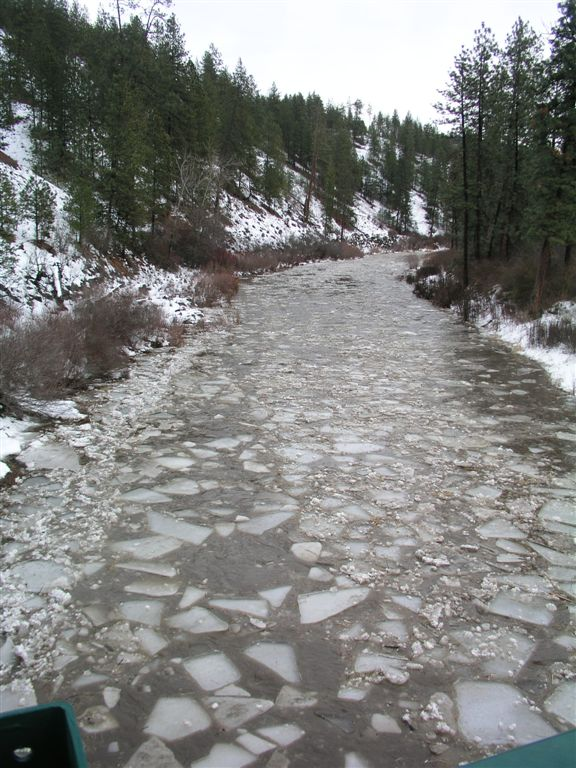
- Ice-jam break up on Latah Creek, 2005

- Location of the mouth of Latah Creek in Washington Latah Creek (the United States)
- Native name: Snt'ut'u'lmkhwkwe; Latah (Nez Perce)

Location
- Country: United States
- State: Washington, Idaho
- Cities: DeSmet, ID, Tekoa, WA, Latah, WA, Spokane, WA

Physical characteristics
- Source: Charles Butte
  - location: Benewah County, Idaho
  - coordinates: 47°06′53″N 116°43′0″W
  - elevation: 3,600 ft (1,100 m)
- Mouth: Spokane River
  - location: Spokane, Spokane County, Washington
  - coordinates: 47°39′36″N 117°27′28″W
  - elevation: 1,700 ft (520 m)
- Length: 60 mi (97 km)
- Basin size: 673 sq mi (1,740 km^{2})
- Discharge
  - location: Spokane
  - average: 231 cu ft/s (6.5 m^{3}/s)
  - minimum: 10 cu ft/s (0.28 m^{3}/s)
  - maximum: 21,200 cu ft/s (600 m^{3}/s)

Basin features
- Progression: Spokane River → Columbia River → Pacific Ocean
- Tributaries
  - left: South Fork Latah/Hangman Creek, Sheep Creek, Marshall Creek, Garden Springs Creek
  - right: Indian Creek, Little Latah/Hangman Creek, Rock Creek, Cove Creek, Rattler Run Creek, California Creek, Stevens Creek

Latah Creek (/ˈleɪtə/ LAY-tə), also known as Hangman Creek, is a large stream in eastern Washington and north central Idaho in the United States. The creek flows northwest from the Rocky Mountains to Spokane, where it empties into the Spokane River. It drains 673 square miles (1,740 km^{2}) in parts of Benewah and Kootenai counties in Idaho, Spokane County and a small portion of Whitman County in Washington, where over 64 percent of its watershed resides. Some major tributaries of the approximately 60-mile (97 km) creek include Little Latah Creek (also known as Little Hangman Creek) and Rock Creek. The average flow of the creek can range from 20 cubic feet per second (0.57 m^{3}/s) to 20,000 cubic feet per second (570 m^{3}/s). Latah Creek receives its name from a Nez Perce word likely meaning "fish". In 1854, the creek received another name, Hangman Creek, from a war between the Palouse Indians and white soldiers, which resulted in several Palouse being hanged alongside the creek.

The Latah Creek watershed is dominated by agriculture, which has released large amounts of sediment from the surrounding Palouse soils into the watershed on an annual basis. This has caused the ruin of natural fish populations, riparian zones, and natural flow patterns. The creek has been channelized in some places, and meanders, islands and natural channel formations have been destroyed. In response to these damaging factors, the water quality overall in the Latah Creek basin is quite low, and "Washington State water quality standards for temperature, dissolved oxygen, pH, and fecal coliforms are routinely violated." The remaining third of the land in the watershed is mostly forest.

== Name ==
The name "Latah" stems from a Nez Perce word meaning "a place of pines and sestles", or "fish". When the Lewis and Clark Expedition passed the area in 1805, they believed that the name was "Lau-taw". Later in a railroad survey, the name used on the small-scale maps was Camas Prairie Creek, while on the maps of larger scale, the name was Kamas Prairie Creek. Other derivatives, including Lahtoo and Kamass, arose from these names, but another name, Ned-Whauld Creek (or Ned-Whauld River) was also documented. Other variant names of the creek include Sin-sin-too-ooley, Hangmans Creek, Hangman's Creek, Hngosmn, Kamas Prairie Creek, Lah-Tah, Lah-taw, Lah-too, Lahtoo, Lartoo, Neduald, and Sin-sin-too-aley.

The name "Hangman" originated from when 17 Palouse Indians were hanged along the creek after a war. Washington State and Spokane County both approve Latah Creek as the official name, while the federal government still identifies the creek is "Hangman".

== Course ==
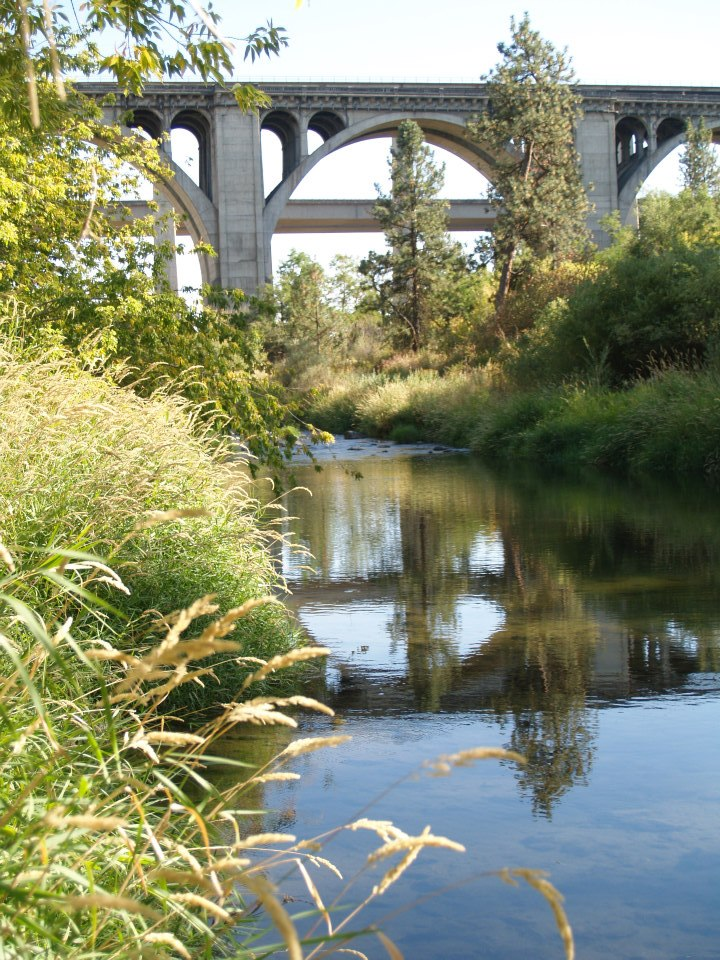
Sunset Highway and I-90 Crossing Latah Creek in Spokane.

Latah Creek begins east of the town of Sanders, in Benewah County, Idaho. The headwaters of the creek are in a small valley south of Charles Butte and Moses Mountain. A few miles after its headwaters, it receives the South Fork Latah Creek, which flows north. At the confluence, the creek turns north, flowing past the towns of Sanders and De Smet, entering channeled scablands that have been converted to farmland. Still small, it runs northwest in a vegetation-choked gully for several miles, beginning to parallel Latah Creek Road. The creek then crosses the Idaho-Washington state border and flows through Tekoa, where it is channelized and runs due north for a short distance. At this point, it has already picked up much agricultural runoff. At Tekoa, it also receives a large tributary, Little Latah Creek.

After meeting Little Latah Creek, Latah Creek continues northwards along State Route 27 to the town of Latah, named for the creek. At Latah, it receives a short tributary, Cove Creek, on the right bank. The creek then bends west and runs north, then swings west again to run near the town of Waverly, and north to pass the town of West Fairfield. (SR 27 breaks away from the creek before Waverly to run to the town of Fairfield.) The creek then enters a steadily deepening, winding gorge that runs generally northwest. It then receives another large tributary, Rock Creek, on the right bank.

After having received Rock Creek, Latah Creek receives California Creek, a 8-mile (13 km), west-southwest tributary, also on the right bank. In its final few miles, California Creek also plunges down a narrow gorge into the Latah Creek canyon. Latah Creek then continues north, and begins to parallel U.S. Highway 195 as it winds through a widening gorge towards the urban area of Spokane. As it enters the Spokane it flows through the Latah/Hangman neighborhood before passing between the West Hills and Peaceful Valley neighborhoods. As Highway 195 continues to parallel it on the left, High Drive winds along the canyon rim on the east (right) bank. With high bluffs rising on the east side and lower cliffs on the west, the creek receives Marshall Creek on the left bank, and its second-last named tributary, Garden Springs Creek, also on the left bank, and crosses under bridges for Interstate 90, a railroad, and Sunset Boulevard. Its last named tributary, Indian Canyon Creek, enters on the left bank as the creek turns northeast to join the Spokane River. Latah Creek's mouth is on the left bank of the Spokane, not too far downstream from Spokane Falls.

=== Little Latah Creek ===
Little Latah Creek, about 10 miles (16 km) long, is a generally southwest-flowing stream, and at the confluence carries almost as much water as Latah Creek. The creek begins a few miles south of Plummer, and its headwaters are near the ridge where north-flowing Plummer Creek also begins. U.S. Highway 95 crosses the creek very near the headwaters, and for its entire length, it follows Lovell Valley Road. Near the junction of Idaho State Route 60 and Washington State Route 274, which is the continuation of Lovell Valley Road in Washington State, it receives Moctileme Creek, its largest tributary, on the left bank. Moctileme Creek is about 6 miles (9.7 km) long, flowing west from Windfall Pass and mostly paralleling State Route 60. At this point, Little Latah Creek has already grown large from agricultural runoff. The creek then bisects Tekoa, flows underneath Washington State Route 27, and enters Latah Creek.

=== Rock Creek ===
Rock Creek begins just about 1-mile (1.6 km) west-southwest of Worley. Like Little Latah Creek, it is in the vicinity of 10 miles (16 km) long. The creek turns west from its headwaters and begins to parallel its North Fork, which flows south then turns west from its headwaters at Plummer. The North Fork is actually longer than the mainstream, although it carries only a slight amount of water when they join. The creek then crosses the state border and flows west of Rockford, then turns west then north, crossing under State Route 27, entering a narrow gorge similar to that of Latah Creek. After meandering in the down cut gorge for a while, the creek straightens out and heads west-northwest, spilling into Latah Creek after turning sharply south just southwest of Duncan.

=== Marshall Creek ===
Marshall Creek begins in the wetlands East of Cheney, flows through the town of Marshall where it was once dammed for a mill, and enters Latah Creek between the Creek at Qualchan golf course and the Cheney-Spokane Road exit of US-195. The creek receives flow from Minnie Creek, which also begins in the wetlands East of Cheney.

== Geology ==
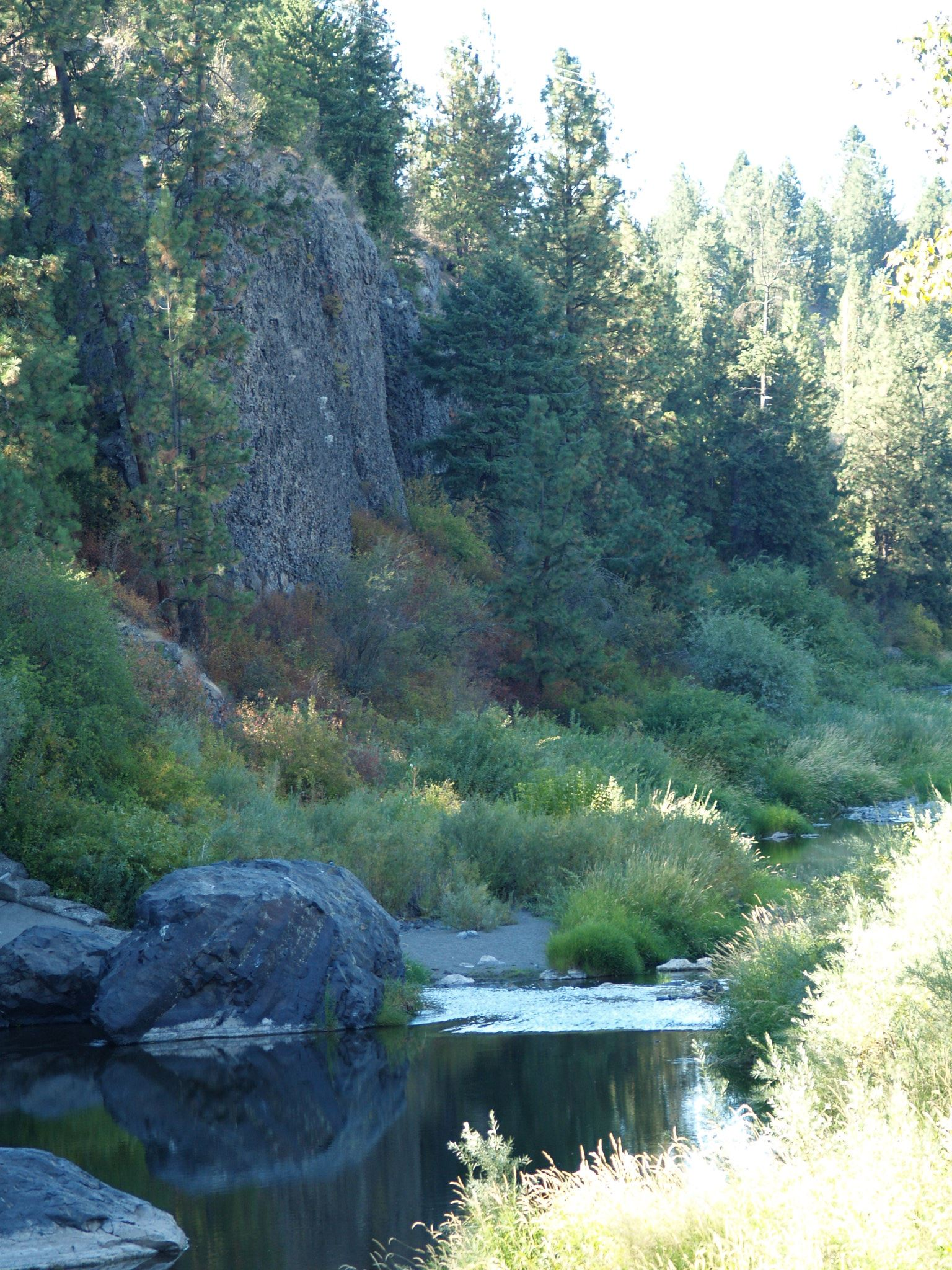
Exposed Basalt along the creek in Spokane.

Latah Creek can be divided into three distinct geological regions; these are a small section of its upper headwaters, a long and broad valley, and channeled scablands. In its headwaters, the creek flows through the foothills of the Rocky Mountains, specifically in those of the Clearwater Mountains. The topography here are steep ridges and peaks dissected by deep, forested close-to-bedrock valleys, drained by rocky and steep mountain streams, with a light covering of soil. After its mountainous headwaters, the creek passes through the much more rounded, older Palouse Hills. Below the deep loess in the Palouse Hills, a basalt layer separates the creek from groundwater, which finally rises to meet stream elevation at the Washington-Idaho state border. Most of the creek from where it turns north at Sanders to about 20 miles (32 km) upstream of its mouth flows in a broad and shallow, arid valley atop several hundred feet of alluvial deposits. In the final 20 miles (32 km), the Latah Creek watershed intersects the Channeled Scablands, which were formed by the Missoula Floods that inundated the area after an ice dam on the Clark Fork Pend Oreille River, during the last ice age, was breached. The floods have deposited "terraces", otherwise known as "backflood deposits", which the creek has eroded through, creating steep and unstable gravel slopes topped by sheer cliffs. Near Spokane, the creek turns to the northwest in a nearly straight line; this is caused by a strike-slip fault named Latah Creek Fault.

== Watershed ==
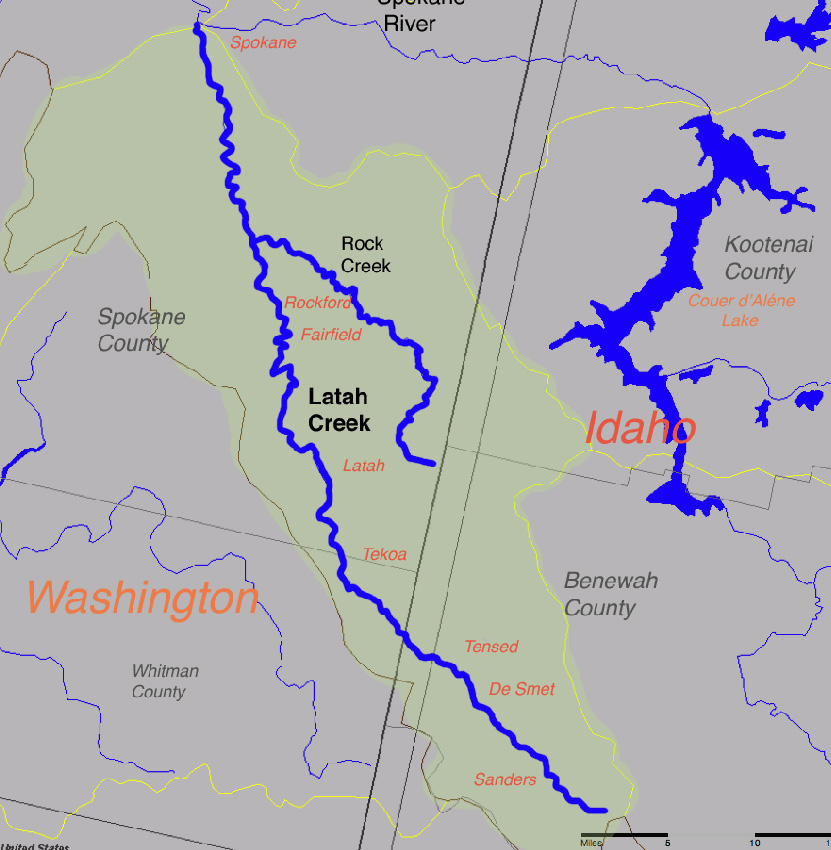
Map of the Latah Creek watershed

The watershed of Latah Creek covers 673 square miles (1,740 km^{2}), stretching from southeast to northwest and straddling the Washington-Idaho state border. The mostly semiarid basin is divided mostly among forests and agriculture, with small towns spread along the length of the creek and its tributaries. The largest city, Spokane, is located at the junction of Latah Creek and the Spokane River. Except for its upper headwaters and the canyon it flows through in its final few miles, the creek flows in an open plain surrounded by low hills, and originally would form meanders and braided streams across this wide floodplain. The conversion of the floodplain to agricultural uses, however, forced the creek to flow in a straighter course. As a result, erosion and turbidity in the creek has increased, while water quality and habitat have decreased. At its mouth, Latah Creek has been known to contribute up to 90 percent of the flow of the downstream Spokane, and as low as 1 percent.

The small drainage divide on the east side of the watershed separates Latah Creek from streams draining into Coeur d'Alene Lake and the St. Joe River, including Plummer Creek. Tributaries flowing off this divide into Latah Creek (right-bank tributaries) include Little Latah Creek, Rattlers Run Creek, Rock Creek and California Creek. Left-bank tributaries include Marshall Creek and North Pine Creek. The watershed is bordered on the south by that of the Palouse River, and on the west, Hole-In-The-Ground Creek, a tributary of the Palouse, and on the northwest, Deep Creek, a tributary of the Spokane. Roads paralleling Latah Creek include (from mouth to headwaters) U.S. Highway 195, Latah Creek Road, Spangle-Waverly Road, Washington State Route 27, and Idaho State Route 95. There are no dams on the mainstem of Latah Creek.

Agricultural land use covers 212,880 acres (861.5 km^{2}) of the Latah Creek watershed, followed by 119,490 acres (483.6 km^{2}) of forest. Urban areas within the Latah Creek basin cover only 12,565 acres (50.85 km^{2}). Because of its importance as a tributary to the Spokane, the pollution in Latah Creek directly affects the Spokane downstream of their confluence. The only Spokane River tributary larger or equal in size to Latah Creek is the Little Spokane River, which joins about 10 miles (16 km) downstream of Latah Creek. Although there are larger tributaries upstream of Coeur d'Alene Lake, the source of the Spokane River (including the St. Joe River and the Coeur d'Alene River) those do not directly feed the Spokane.

=== Streamflow ===
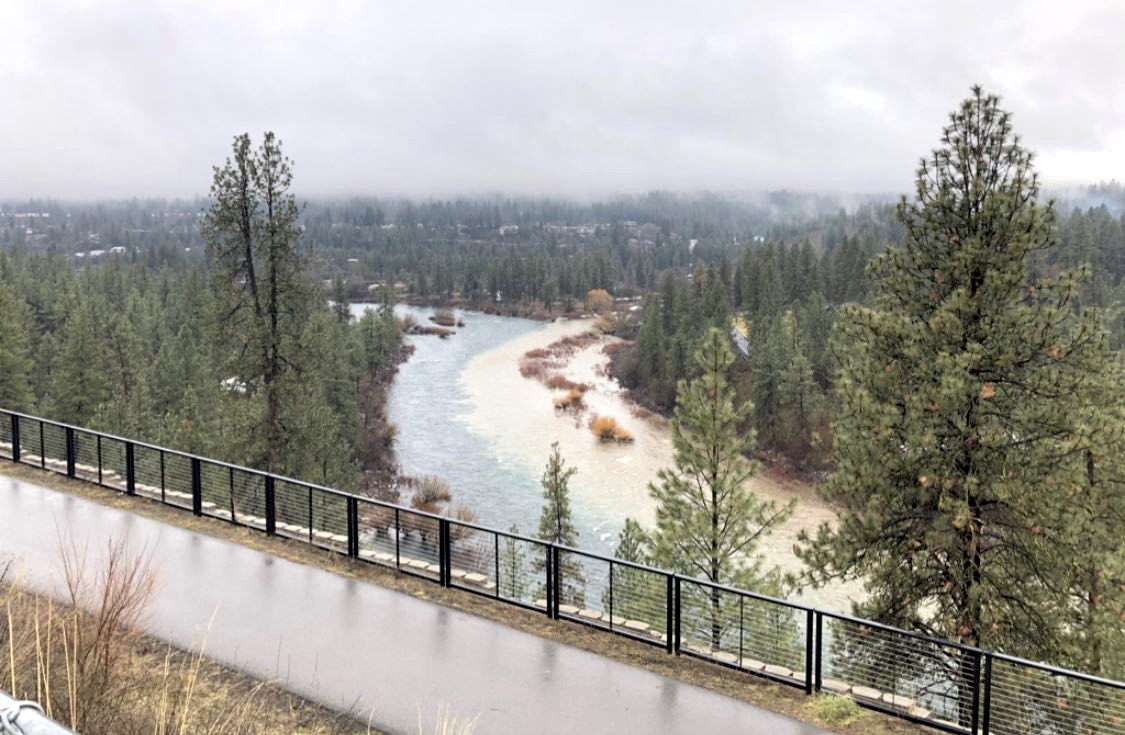
Turbid waters of Latah Creek entering the Spokane River during a period of high flow

Streamflow in Latah Creek is highly variable, with the creek tending to flood in the winter and spring, diminishing to almost completely dry in the summer. The creek typically does not totally dry up, however, due to agricultural return flows. The monthly average is 242 cubic feet per second (6.9 m^{3}/s), while winter and spring peak flows top 7,585 cubic feet per second (214.8 m^{3}/s) on average. The highest recorded peak flow at the creek's mouth in Spokane was 21,200 cubic feet per second (600 m^{3}/s) on 1 January 1997, closely followed by a flow of 20,600 cubic feet per second (580 m^{3}/s) on 3 February 1963. The lowest recorded peak flow was 395 cubic feet per second (11.2 m^{3}/s) in 1994.

== History ==
In 1854, Latah Creek received its other name, Hangman Creek, which stayed for over a century and a half. According to legend, a Palouse Indian named Qualchan, discovered a cavalry outpost while traveling alone. He was said to have prayed to the god of the mist to disarm the camp's sentries, and as a result, it began to snow, and when the snow had changed into a blizzard, Qualchan led the whites' horses out of the camp, and took them to his camp on the Columbia River. The Indians later rediscovered the whites' camp, only to find that they had left. His war party was later discovered, and after a brief war, called the "George Wright War", "Spokane-Coeur d'Aléne War", or "Big Fight", Qualchan and six other Palouses were captured and hanged along Latah Creek, giving rise to the name, Hangman Creek. On 5 October of that year, four more Indians were hanged alongside the creek. In November, 33 Indian hostages were released, ending the war. In the aftermath, the Washington State government and the U.S. Board on Geographic Names have frequently disagreed on the name of the creek. While Washington State, specifically Spokane County, claims and refers to the creek as Latah, the Board and local residents still refers to the creek as Hangman.

A single known bog lay beside Latah Creek for many tens of thousands of years, dating from the previous Ice Age. This bog was discovered in May 1876 by a homesteader, Benjamin Coplen, who found what seemed to be a gigantic bone in the peat-covered water. Coplen then located a vertebra of similarly large scale, and a shoulder blade. The bog was quickly drained, and an enormous quantity of bones were discovered. The shoulder blade and vertebra were later determined to be that of a woolly mammoth. Nearby homesteaders William and Thomas Donahoe also drained a similar bog and located more bones and a skull. These bones, along with those from the Coplen bog, were delivered first to other cities in Washington State for exhibition. The original mammoth skeleton was later delivered to the Chicago Academy of Sciences, and then the Field Museum of Natural History of Chicago. It was later proposed that the Missoula Floods were responsible for depositing a "bathtub ring" in the channeled scablands of Washington and Idaho, including in this particular bog.

== Fishes ==
It was said that in the early 19th century, Latah Creek was a clear and pristine stream that provided suitable habitat for anadromous fish. However, the creek was shallow and slow-moving naturally, and was not an important habitat for these fish. The primary fishes of Latah Creek were sucker and whitefish. Because of the aridity of its basin and the increasing pollution in Latah Creek and many of its tributaries, it is no longer a productive watershed for fishes and other aquatic species. Even as early as 1892, Latah Creek was described as

This is an unimportant stream tributary to the Spokane. It was examined in the vicinity of Tekoa, Washington, where it was found to be a small filthy stream not suitable for trout but well supplied with minnows and suckers of several species.

At the time of the 1892–93 sampling, there were two fishes that have apparently become extinct between then and 1974. The Bridgelip sucker and Chiselmouth have disappeared in that time period. In the inventory taken by Gilbert and Evermann (1892) there were many species of suckers, some of which are still present in the creek today. The Native American variant name Snt'ut'u'lmkhwkwe is known to mean "Suckers in the Water", which implies that the sucker are likely the primary fish of Latah Creek.

== See also ==
- List of rivers of Washington (state)
- List of longest streams of Idaho

== Works cited ==
- Ruby, Robert H.; Brown, John A (1988). Indians of the Pacific Northwest: A History. University of Oklahoma Press. ISBN 0-8061-2113-0.
- Frey, Rodney (2001). Landscape traveled by coyote and crane: The world of the Schitsu'umsh (Coeur d'Aléne Indians). University of Washington. ISBN 0-295-98171-7.
