= Finch (disambiguation) =

A finch is a passerine bird, often seed-eating, found chiefly in the northern hemisphere and Africa.

Finch may also refer to:

== Places ==
=== Canada ===
- Finch, Ontario, a former village and railway station in North Stormont, Ontario
- Finch, a former township in North Stormont, Ontario
- Finch Avenue, a major arterial road running through suburban Toronto
  - Finch (TTC), a subway station pertaining to Finch Avenue, Toronto
  - Finch Bus Terminal, a bus terminal pertaining to Finch Avenue, Toronto, which also serves York Region

=== Elsewhere ===
- Finch County, New South Wales, Australia
- Mount Finch, a mountain in Antarctica

== People ==
- Finch (rapper), German rapper
- Finch (surname), including a list of people with that name
- Justice Finch (disambiguation)
- Baron Finch (disambiguation), two titles

== Transportation ==
- Finch Restorations, a car restoration company
- Pungs Finch, an American automobile
- Fleet Finch, a training biplane

=== Ships ===
- HMS Finch, formerly USS Eagle before her capture in 1813
- MV Finch, a ship that tried to deliver supplies to Gaza in May 2011
- USS Finch, two American ships

== Entertainment and media ==
- Finch (novel), a 2009 fantasy novel by Jeff VanderMeer
- Finch (film), a 2021 film starring Tom Hanks
- Finch (American band), a post-hardcore group popular in the 2000s
- Finch (Australian band), active in the 1970s, later known as Contraband
- Finch (Dutch band), a progressive rock group popular in the 1970s
- The Finches, American folk pop band
- Finch (album), a 2009 album by Murder By Death
- Finch (EP), the post-hardcore group's eponymous EP
- Finch (self care app), an app that helps you with self-care.

== Facilities and structures ==
- Finch Building (disambiguation), various American buildings
- Finch College, a defunct women's college in Manhattan, New York
- Finch Field, a baseball venue in Thomasville, North Carolina
- Finch House (disambiguation), various American buildings

== Other uses ==
- Finch (software), an open-source console-based version of the instant messaging client Pidgin
