= Finch (surname) =

Finch is an English surname. Finch was also the surname of the Earls of Winchilsea and Nottingham (now Finch-Hatton) and Earls of Aylesford (now Finch-Knightley).

== People with the surname ==
- Adam Finch (born 2000), English cricketer
- Adam Finch (film editor) (born 1961), British film editor
- Anne Finch, Countess of Winchilsea (1661–1720), English poet
- Anne Finch, Viscountess Conway (1631–1679), English philosopher
- Annie Finch (born 1956), American poet and writer
- Aaron Finch (born 1986), Australian cricketer
- Alfred William Finch (1854–1930), Belgian artist
- Andy Finch, American snowboarder
- Andrew Finch, American game designer
- Andrew Finch (politician), member of the 41st and the 42nd New York State Legislatures (1818–1819)
- Andrew Thomas Finch (c. 1989–2017), 2017 Wichita swatting victim
- Asahel Finch Jr. (1809–1883), American lawyer and politician
- Bill Finch (politician) (born 1956), American politician from Connecticut
- Brett Finch (born 1981), Australian rugby league player
- Brian Finch (1936–2007), British television scriptwriter and dramatist
- Caleb Finch (born 1939), American gerontologist and professor
- Catrin Finch, Welsh harpist
- Clair Finch (1911–1976), American politician and Wisconsin state legislator
- Charles B. Finch, American businessman and political activist
- Charles Finch (disambiguation), multiple people
- Clark Finch (died 1945), Canadian businessman
- Cliff Finch (1927–1986), American politician from Mississippi
- Chris Finch (born 1969), American professional basketball coach
- David Finch (disambiguation), multiple people
- Earl Finch (1830–1888), American politician
- Edith Finch, Countess of Aylesford (1854–1897) , English noblewoman
- Edward R. Finch (1873–1965), American lawyer and politician
- Elisabeth R. Finch, American television writer
- Ernie Finch (1899–1983), Welsh rugby union player
- Florence Finch (1858–1939), American suffragist, journalist, and novelist
- Florence Finch (1915–2017), Filipino-American World War II resistance member
- Francis Miles Finch (1827–1907), American judge, poet, and academic
- Fred Finch (1945–2018), Australian politician
- Fred Finch (footballer) (1895–1952), Australian footballer (Australian rules)
- Gary Finch, New York politician
- George Finch (disambiguation), multiple people
- Harold Finch (1898–1979), Welsh trade unionist and politician
- Harry Finch (1907–1949), Australian rugby player
- Heneage Finch (disambiguation), multiple people
- Horace Finch (1906–1980), English organist and pianist
- Isaac Finch (1783–1845), American politician from New York
- J. Finch (Berkshire cricketer), English professional cricketer
- James Finch (born 1950), American businessman and racing team owner
- Janet Finch (born 1946), British sociologist
- Jennie Finch (born 1980), American softball pitcher
- Jennifer Finch (born 1966), American musician
- Jessica Garretson Finch (1871–1949), American educator, author, and women's rights activist
- Joel Finch (born 1956), American baseball player
- John Finch (disambiguation), multiple people
- Jon Finch (1942–2012), English actor
- Lance Finch (1938–2020), Canadian jurist
- Louisa Finch, Countess of Aylesford (1760–1832), British naturalist and botanical illustrator
- Mark Finch (1961–1995), English promoter of LGBT cinema
- Michael Finch, American politician
- Nigel Finch (1949–1995), English film director
- Ninette Finch (born 1933), English actress
- Oscar Finch (1827–1913), American politician
- Peter Finch (1916–1977), English-Australian actor
- Peter Finch (poet), Welsh poet and author
- Phillipa Finch (born 1981), New Zealand netball player
- Rachael Finch (born 1988), Australian beauty pageant titleholder and television reporter
- Raymond L. Finch (1940–2023), judge of the District Court of the Virgin Islands
- Richard Finch (disambiguation), multiple people
- Robert Finch (disambiguation), multiple people
- Roy Finch (disambiguation), multiple people
- Ruy Finch, American geologist, active 1930's
- Sharif Finch (born 1995), American football player
- Sheila Finch, (born 1935), English-American author
- Stanley Finch (1872–1951), American federal law enforcement executive
- Steven R. Finch (born 1959), American mathematician
- William Coles Finch (1864–1944), British historian and author

== Fictional characters ==
- Adam Finch, a character in The Thing, the 2011 prequel to the 1982 film of the same name
- Atticus Finch or any other member of the Finch family, characters from the books To Kill a Mockingbird and Go Set a Watchman
- Charles Finch, main character in Lady in the Death House
- Chris Finch, character from the UK TV sitcom The Office
- Cleo Finch, medical doctor in the television series ER
- Dennis Finch, main character portrayed by David Spade from the US sitcom Just Shoot Me!
- Edith Finch, a character from the PC game "What Remains of Edith Finch"
- Eric Finch, character from the graphic novel V for Vendetta
- J. Pierrepont Finch, protagonist of the musical How to Succeed in Business Without Really Trying
- Paul Finch, character from the popular American teen film series American Pie
- Sidd Finch, fictional baseball player
- Theodore Finch, a character from the young adult novel All the Bright Places
- Tom Finch, a character in Stan Rogers' poem "Finch's Complaint" from the album Fogarty's Cove

== See also ==
- Finch (disambiguation)
- Justice Finch (disambiguation)
- Fink (surname)
