= Charles Finch (disambiguation) =

Charles Finch (born 1980) is an American author.

Charles Finch, or related names, may also refer to:

- Charles Finch, 4th Earl of Winchilsea (1672–1712), British peer and Member of Parliament
- Charles Finch (MP) (1752–1819), British member of Parliament for Castle Rising and Maidstone
- Charles Wray Finch (1809–1873), Australian politician
- Charles B. Finch (1920–1996), American businessman
- Cliff Finch (Charles Clifton Finch, 1927–1986), American politician and former Governor of Mississippi
- Charlie Finch (1953–2022), American art critic
- Charles Finch (British businessman) (born 1962), British businessman and film producer
- Charlieonnafriday (Charlie Finch, born 2003), American musician
- Charles Finch, actor in the Doctor Who serial The Invasion
- Charles Finch, fictional character in the 1944 movie Lady in the Death House

== See also ==
- Finch (surname)
- Charlie Fincher, Australian rules footballer
