= Finch House =

Finch House may refer to:

- James W. Finch House, Monterey, California, listed on the National Register of Historic Places (NRHP)
- John A. Finch Caretaker's House, Hayden Lake, Idaho, listed on the NRHP in Kootenai County, Idaho
- Fred Finch House, Davenport, Iowa, NRHP-listed
- Burrus–Finch House, McKinney, Texas, listed on the NRHP in Collin County, Texas
- Knight–Finch House, Orem, Utah, NRHP-listed
- Finch House (Spokane, Washington), listed on the NRHP in Spokane County, Washington
- John A. Finch Memorial Nurses Home, Spokane, Washington, also known as Finch Hall, NRHP-listed

== See also ==
- Finch Building (disambiguation)
