= Finch Building =

Finch Building may refer to:

- Finch, Vanslyck and McConville Dry Goods Company Building, St. Paul, Minnesota, listed on the National Register of Historic Places (NRHP)
- Finch Building (Scranton, Pennsylvania), listed on the NRHP in Lackawanna County, Pennsylvania
- Finch Building (Aberdeen, Washington), formerly listed on the NRHP in Grays Harbor County, Washington
- John A. Finch Memorial Nurses Home, Spokane, Washington, also known as Finch Hall, NRHP-listed

== See also ==
- Finch House (disambiguation)
