= Robert Finch =

Robert Finch may refer to:

- Robert Finch (politician) (1925–1995), Republican politician from California
- Robert Finch (antiquarian) (1783–1830), English antiquary
- Robert Finch (Lord Mayor) (1944–2016), British businessman, lawyer, and lord mayor
- Robert Finch (nature writer) (1943–2024), American nature writer and essayist
- Robert Finch (poet) (1900–1995), Canadian poet and academic
- Robert Finch (priest) (1724–1803), English divine
- Robert Finch (rugby league) (born 1955), Australian rugby league player
- Robert Finch (yacht designer) (1930–2016), American yacht designer
- Bob Finch (born 1954), British coal trader and businessman
- Bobby Finch (c. 1948–1978), English footballer

== See also ==
- Finch (surname)
