= The Maddening =

1995 film by Danny Huston

- Directed by: Danny Huston
- Screenplay by: Henry Slesar; Leslie Greif
- Based on: The Maddening by Andrew Neiderman
- Produced by: Mark Amin; Charles Finch; Leslie Greif
- Starring: Burt Reynolds; Angie Dickinson; Mia Sara; Brian Wimmer
- Cinematography: Nick McLean
- Edited by: Eric L. Beason; Roberto Silvi
- Music by: Peter Manning Robinson
- Distributed by: Trimark Pictures
- Release date: September 8, 1995
- Running time: 95 minutes
- Country: United States
- Language: English
- Box office: $5,000

The Maddening is a 1995 American psychological thriller film directed by Danny Huston. Based on the novel Playmates by Andrew Neiderman, the film was released direct-to-video and starred Burt Reynolds, Mia Sara, and Angie Dickinson.

== Plot ==
A young couple, Cassie and David Osborne, have an intense argument as he spends too much time on business trips. The next morning, after David goes to work, Cassie takes their five-year-old daughter Samantha to stay with her sister, Joanne, for a few days. Having car trouble, they stop at a seedy-looking gas station, where they are tended to by Roy Scudder, the owner. Scudder rigs the vehicle to break down a short distance down the road, before offering to tow them back to his place.

Once there, Cassie meets Roy's wife Georgina, who has been left disturbed since the mysterious death of her baby boy. Samantha is made to be a "playmate" for the Scudders' daughter Jill, who appears to be as unstable as her mother. Georgina and Jill believe the two Osbornes to in fact be Marlena and Donna, respectively Georgina's widowed sister and niece. Cassie hears Samantha cry and rushes upstairs, only to be led to the wrong room by Georgina who locks her in.

Joanne panics when Cassie and Samantha never show up at her house. She calls the police, convinced that David had something to do with their disappearance. David begins desperately searching for his missing wife and child. He is tracked by a police officer who is convinced David has murdered Cassie and Samantha. His suspicions are increased by a nosy neighbor who wrongfully insists that David beats Cassie.

While trapped, Cassie hides a large wrench Roy inadvertently left inside the room, and later uses it to knock the pins up from the room's door hinges. Georgina insists upon bathing Cassie and calling her "sis", and cuts her hair to look more like Marlena. Samantha is let out by Jill, who leads her by a rope she's placed around Samantha's neck. Samantha runs to her mother in the bathroom but she is pulled away from Cassie by Roy. Cassie attacks Roy with the wrench, but he overpowers her and takes her back to her room. Roy hallucinates his deceased father, who encourages him to rape her.

David sets out to find his wife and daughter, going first to Joanne's house. Joanne receives a call from the detective notifying her that they'd found blood in the Osbornes' kitchen, and asking her to stall David. Joanne accuses David of killing Cassie and Samantha, noting the blood found in the kitchen. David shows her the blood came from his own hand when he cut it on a plate earlier. David forces his way out, taking the keys to Joanne's and her husband's Volkswagen Microbus to avoid having the police track him in his car. David stops for gas at the same station Cassie had used earlier, and learns that Cassie and Samantha had received directions on a shortcut towards Turkey Creek, where the Scudder home is. David arrives at the Scudders' house and finds Roy in his garage, who claims not to have seen them. David realizes that his wife and daughter are in the house when Jill drops the doll he bought for Samantha out the window. However, Roy attacks and strangles David with a chain. David is dropped into a dry water well, where he is partially buried. Later that evening, Roy returns to Cassie with drugged milk, and has a flashback of himself smothering his son Arthur in his crib.

David regains consciousness and climbs out of the well, where he notices human remains. Meanwhile, Cassie escapes her room, but in her unsteady state, she tumbles down the last few steps and is knocked unconscious. Roy carries her back to bed, before raping and chaining her to the bed. Samantha escapes from her room after Jill falls asleep and talks to Cassie, who encourages Samantha to head out for the woods and look for a car. Samantha is grabbed by David and taken into the bathroom. David hears Roy and Jill coming so he tells Samantha to go back to them, promising he will return for her. He steps into the shower and then climbs out of the window before Roy enters. Samantha uses reverse psychology to trick Jill into taking her into the woods when Jill plans a punishment for her escaping. In the woods, Jill digs up Arthur's grave, and Samantha escapes. David finds Cassie, but hears Roy and runs out of the house. Roy pursues him through the swamps. David hides underwater and makes a run back to the house, when Roy finds Arthur's opened grave and collapses in grief.

The police officer stops at the gas station, where he discovers that Roy has been bringing in auto parts. The officer gets instructions to the Scudder home, and finds the Volkswagen Microbus David took earlier. Roy slices the officer's throat as he calls in the discovery.

Cassie tells Georgina that Roy raped her, but Georgina does not believe her, mentioning that Marlena was going to call the police to report that Roy had killed Arthur. David shuts off the power to the house from outside, and Georgina gets a hurricane lamp to light the room where she is sitting with Cassie. David arrives with a hacksaw and begins to work on the chains tying Cassie to the bed. Roy arrives and tells Georgina that Marlena and Donna are dead, and that they died when Georgina gave them lethal overdoses of sleeping tablets in milk to prevent them going to the police. Roy gets into a fight with Cassie and David and throws the hurricane lamp at the wall starting a fire.

Being taunted by the hallucination of his father Roy shoots at the hallucination but instead kills Georgina. In the following combat Roy shouts to Cassie "I love you Marlena" before Cassie shoots him dead. The next day the Osborne parents are reunited with Samantha and Jill sits rocking on the well before dropping Samantha's doll into it.

== Cast ==
- Burt Reynolds as Roy Scudder
- Angie Dickinson as Georgina Scudder
- Mia Sara as Cassie Osborne
- Candace Hutson as Jill Scudder
- Brian Wimmer as David Osborne
- Marie Debrey as Joanne
- Kayla Buglewicz as Samantha Osborne
