= John Finch =

John Finch may refer to:

- John Finch (martyr) (1548–1584), English Roman Catholic farmer
- John Finch (MP for Winchelsea) (died 1642)
- John Finch, 1st Baron Finch (1584–1660), Speaker of the House of Commons, 1628–1629
- John Finch (ambassador) (1626–1682), ambassador of England to the Ottoman Empire
- John Finch, 6th Earl of Winchilsea (1682/83–1729), English peer
- John Finch (died 1740) (1689–1740), MP for Maidstone 1722–1740
- John Finch (died 1763) (c. 1692–1763), MP for Higham Ferrers 1724–1741 and Rutland 1741–1747
- John Thomas Finch (1930–2017), British structural biologist
- John A. Finch (1852–1915), English businessman
- John B. Finch (1852–1887), American politician and educator, chairman of the Prohibition Party
- John W. Finch (1873–1951), American mining engineer

== See also ==
- Jon Finch (1942–2012), English actor
- Finch (surname)
