= Roy Finch =

Roy Finch may refer to:

- Roy G. Finch (1884–1959), American civil engineer and politician from New York
- Roy Finch (footballer) (1922–2007), Welsh professional footballer
- Roy Finch (gridiron football), a running back and return specialist in the Canadian Football League
- Henry Leroy Finch Jr., philosopher and pacifist
- Henry LeRoy Finch, known as Roy, American film director

== See also ==
- Finch (surname)
