= John A. Finch Arboretum =

Park in Spokane County, Washington, United States of America

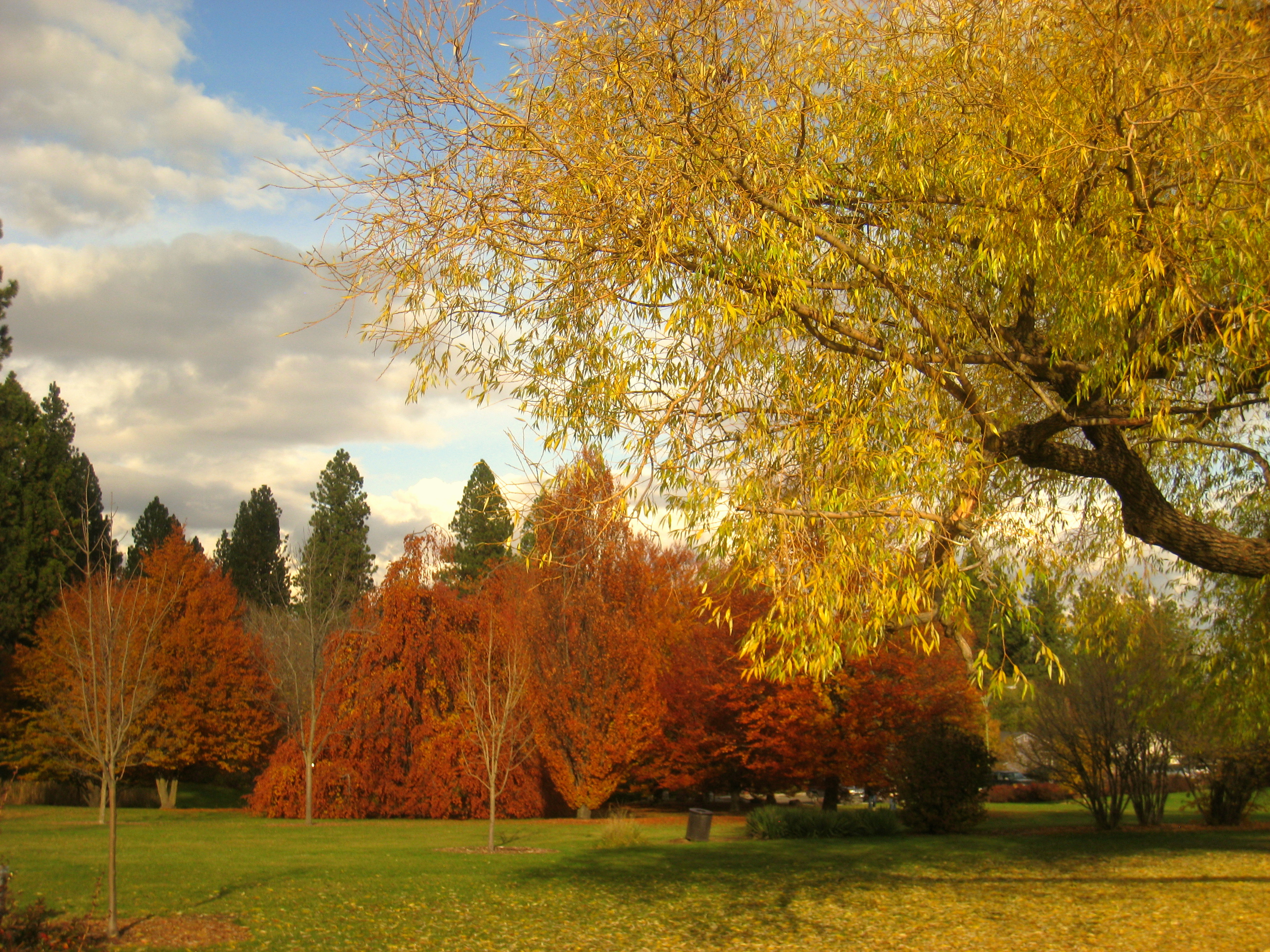
- Finch Arboretum during fall
- Interactive map of John A. Finch Arboretum
- Type: Urban Park, Arboretum
- Location: Spokane, Washington
- Coordinates: 47°38′27.5″N 117°28′01.3″W
- Area: 56.65 acres (22.93 ha)
- Established: 1912; 114 years ago
- Operator: Spokane Parks and Recreation Department
- Status: Open year round
- Public transit: Spokane Transit Authority
- Website: Official website

John A. Finch Arboretum 56.65 acres (22.93 ha) is a public arboretum located at West 3404 Woodland Boulevard, Spokane, Washington, United States in the West Hills neighborhood. It is open daily without charge. Dogs are not allowed at the arboretum.

The arboretum was established in 1949 after the last living executor of the John A. Finch estate released $250,000 for the purpose. The landscape follows Garden Springs Creek, and now contains about 2,000 trees and shrubs, including 65 groups of lilacs, as well as a rhododendron grove, conifer and maple collections, and a nature trail. The arboretum lies in a small valley running southwest-to-northeast carved by the creek. I-90 and the Sunset Highway, which use the valley to descend into Spokane from the higher elevation of the Columbia Plateau, respectively form the southern and northern borders of the park.

The arboretum is home to the Touch and See Nature Trail, which is owned by the Girl Scout council in the area. It was refurbished by Darlea Chatburn in 2004 who received her Gold Award after the completion of the project.

== Gallery ==
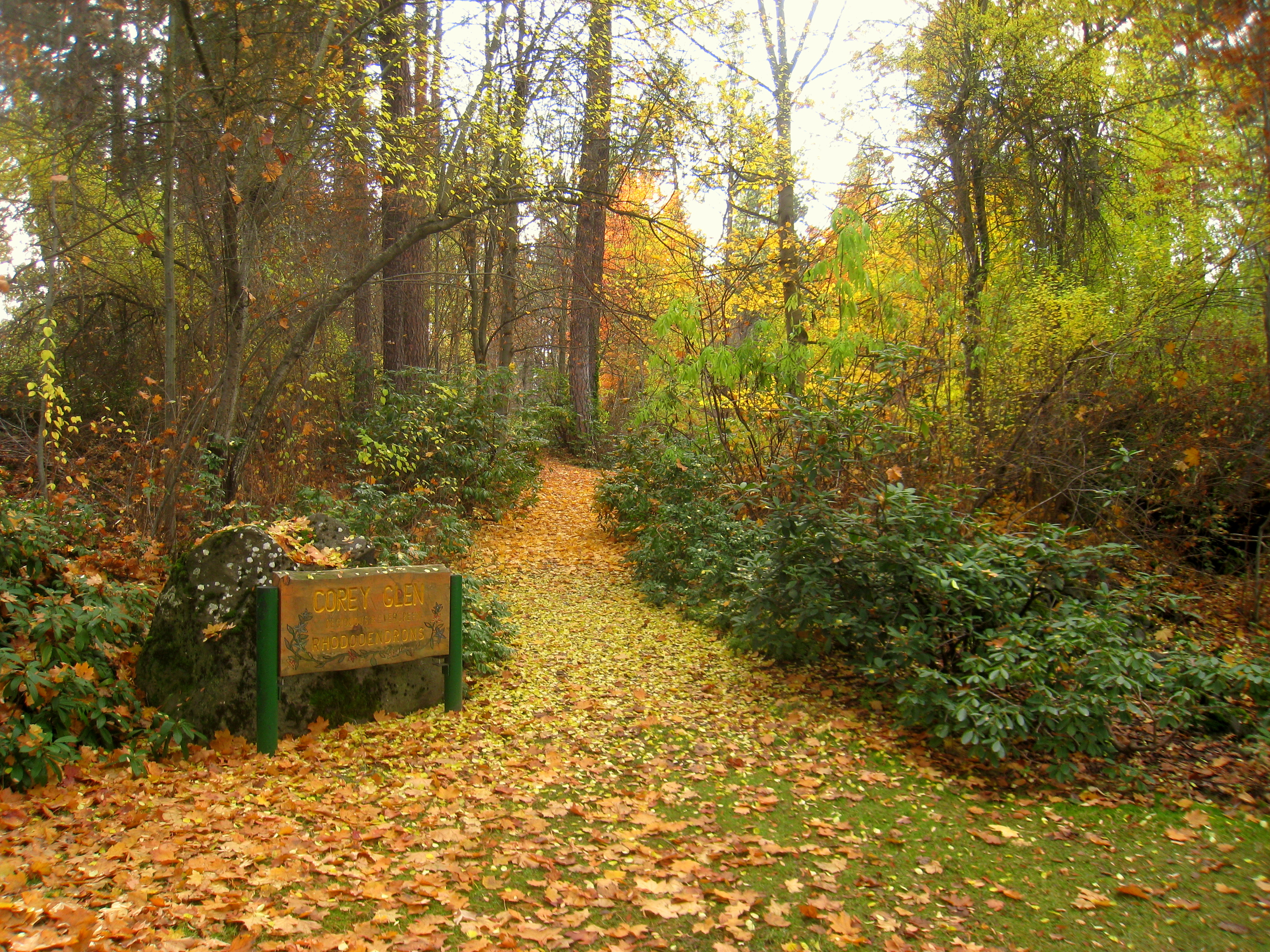
The rhododendron section: Corey Glen

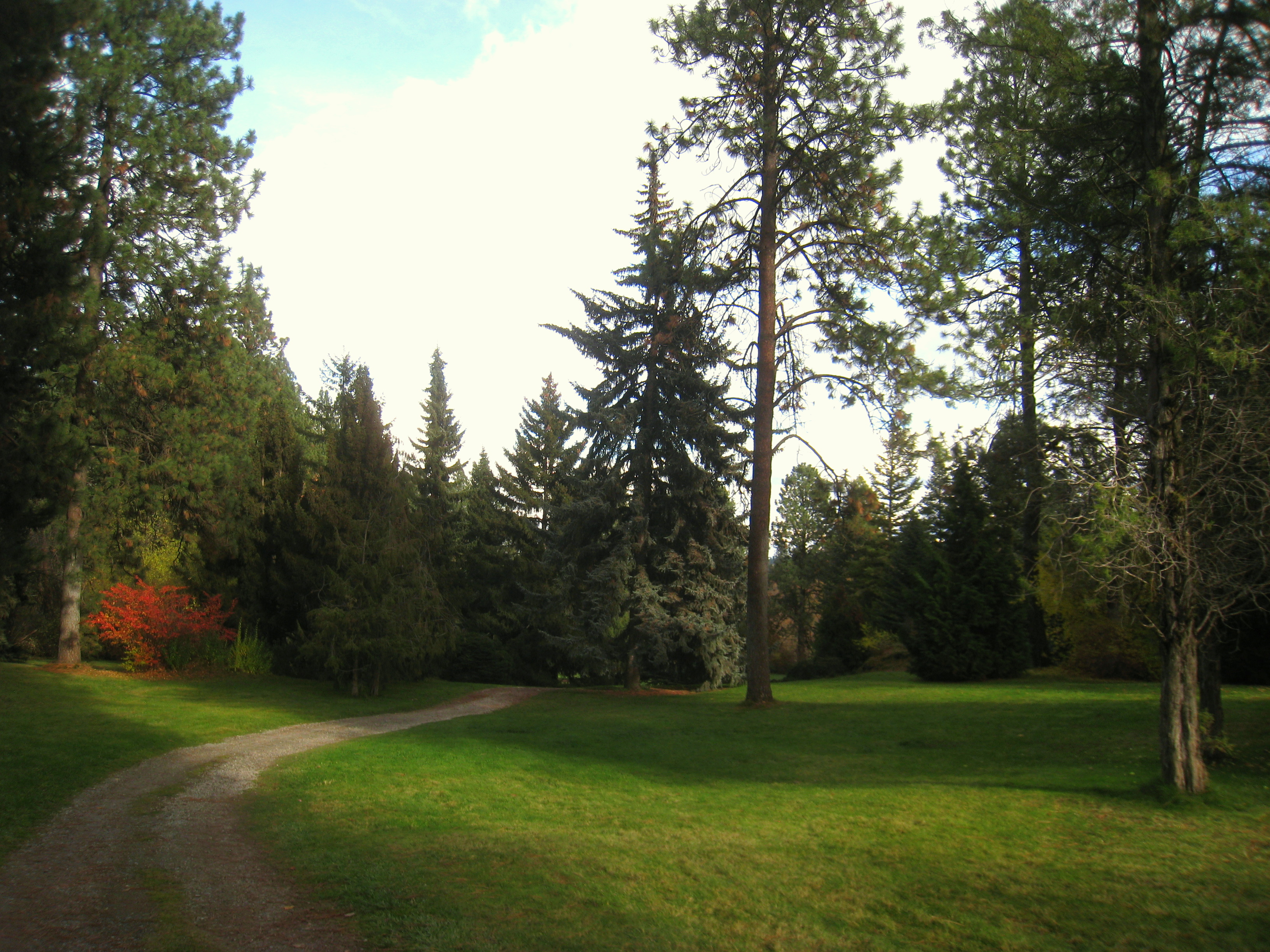
Lawn at Finch Arboretum

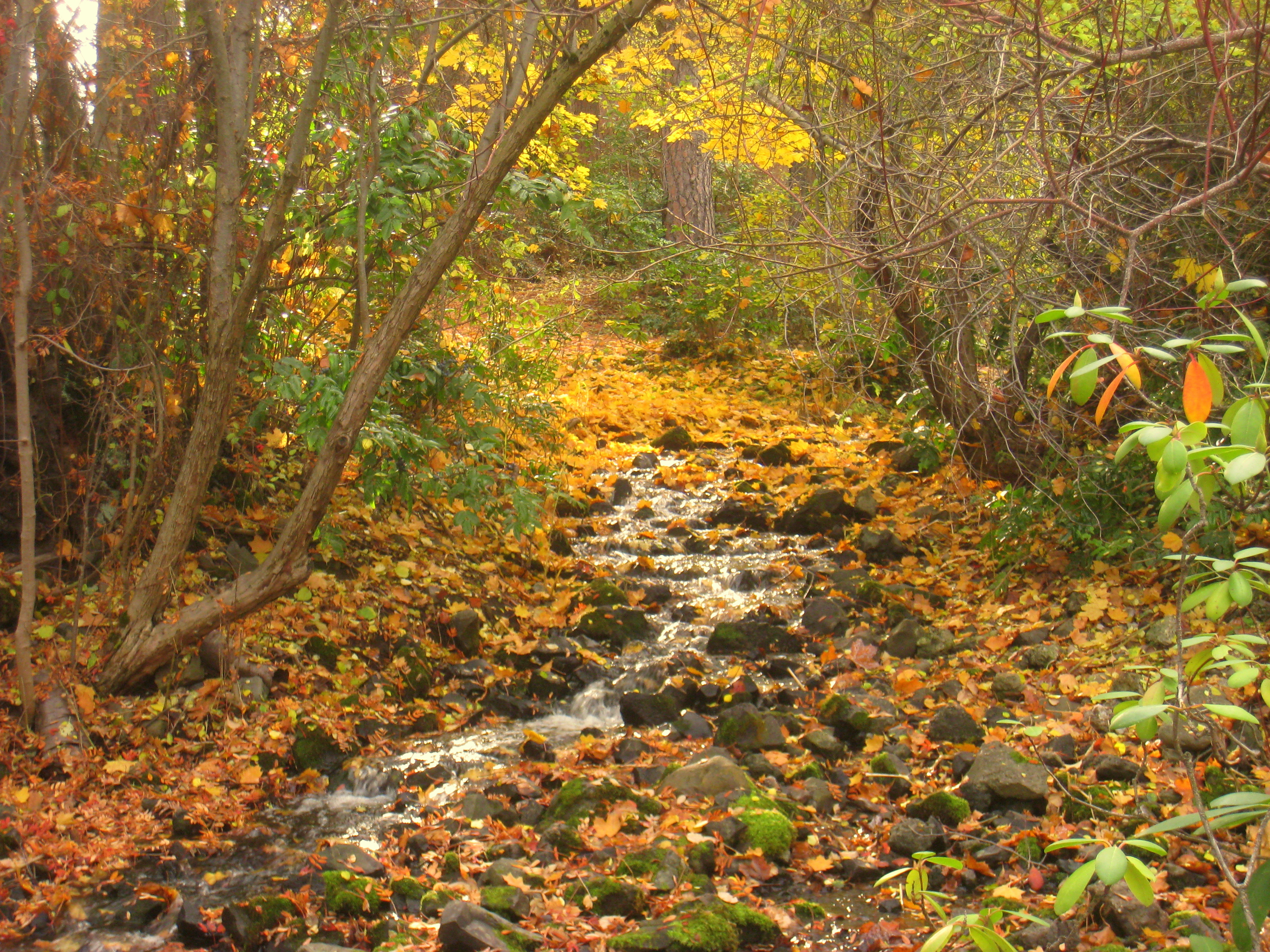
Garden Springs Creek in Autumn

== See also ==
- List of botanical gardens in the United States
