= Jason Kanabus =

British philanthropist (1976–2006)

Jason Kanabus (15 June 1976 – 6 July 2006) was a member of the Sainsbury supermarket family, and on his death he left £2.5 million to charity.

== Working life and hobby ==
Jason Kanabus was brought up on his parents' farm near Horsham, Sussex, his mother Annabel Kanabus being the youngest child of Sir Robert Sainsbury. He attended the local comprehensive school and on leaving school he studied at Brinsbury agricultural college before deciding to work on the family farm.

Jason Kanabus's hobby was lawn mower racing, and he was a successful racer, regularly winning races as well as helping to develop the sport further.

== Cancer and death ==
In June 2004 he was diagnosed with cancer and despite undergoing operations and chemotherapy the cancer progressed. On his 30th birthday on 15 June 2006 he inherited £2.5 million from a trust fund set up for him by his grandfather. Just three weeks later, doctors at the Royal Marsden hospital told him that he was terminally ill and that he probably only had a few months to live. The next day he collapsed and died.

After his death, his mother wrote in his memory the popular web page, "Am I Going to Die?" to help other families with a young person facing a terminal illness, as well as a website about tuberculosis, which kills many people of Kanabus's age.

== Legacy for farming ==
In his will he left the whole of the £2.5 million he had inherited to the Prince's Trust, with the request that the money be used to help young people become established in farming. There has since been some controversy over the use of the Fund by the Prince's Trust, with claims being made that the Trust has failed to establish young people in farming, as stipulated.
