= Richard Finch =

Richard Finch may refer to:

- Richard Finch (boxer), Australian boxer who competed at the 1984 Summer Olympics
- Richard Finch (golfer) (born 1977), English professional golfer
- Richard Finch (musician) (born 1954), American musician
- Richard Finch (Quaker)
- Richard Finch (rugby union), English rugby union player

== See also ==
- Finch (surname)
