= George Finch =

George Finch may refer to:

- George Finch, 9th Earl of Winchilsea (1752–1826), English politician
- George Finch (politician, born 1794), MP for Lymington, Stamford and Rutland, illegitimate son of above
- George Finch (politician, born 1835), MP for Rutland, son of the above
- George Finch (architect) (1930–2013), British architect
- George Finch (chemist) (1888–1970), Australian chemist and mountaineer
- George Finch (councillor) (born 2006), leader of Warwickshire County Council and Nuneaton and Bedworth Borough Council
- George G. Finch (1902–1986), US Air National Guard general

== See also ==
- George Finch-Hatton
- Finch (surname)
