= Heneage Finch =

Heneage Finch may refer to (in chronological order):

- Sir Heneage Finch (speaker) (1580–1631), Speaker of the House of Commons 1625–1626
- Heneage Finch, 1st Earl of Nottingham (1621–1682), son of Sir Heneage Finch
- Heneage Finch, 3rd Earl of Winchilsea (1628–1689)
- Heneage Finch, 1st Earl of Aylesford (c. 1649–1719), English statesman and lawyer
- Heneage Finch, 5th Earl of Winchilsea (1657–1726)
- Heneage Finch, 2nd Earl of Aylesford (1683–1757), British peer and member of the House of Lords
- Heneage Finch, 3rd Earl of Aylesford (1715–1777), British Member of Parliament for Maidstone and Leicestershire
- Heneage Finch, 4th Earl of Aylesford (1751–1812), artist and politician
- Heneage Finch, 5th Earl of Aylesford (1786–1859), High Steward of Sutton Coldfield
- Heneage Finch (surveyor) (1793–1850), grandson of the 3rd Earl of Aylesford and namesake of Finch County, New South Wales
- Heneage Finch, 6th Earl of Aylesford (1824–1871), politician and amateur cricketer
- Heneage Finch, 7th Earl of Aylesford (1849–1885)

== See also ==
- Finch (surname)
