= David Finch =

David Finch may refer to:

- David Finch (comics) (born 1972), Canadian comic book artist
- David Finch (rugby league), rugby league footballer of the 1970s and 1980s
- David Finch (True Blood), a fictional character in the TV series

== See also ==
- David Fincher (born 1962), American film director
- Finch (surname)
