= Inland Northwest Health Services =

US health organization

Inland Northwest Health Services (INHS) is a non-profit 501©(3)organization. INHS main focus is to bring accessible health care to Spokane and Inland Northwest. INHS oversees several health care services, including direct patient care, health information technology and rural outreach.

== History ==
INHS was created in 1994 by executives from Spokane’s four major hospitals- Deaconess Medical Center, Providence Holy Family Hospital, Providence Sacred Heart Medical Center and Children's Hospital and MultiCare Valley Hospital. They merged competing business lines and formed an organization to oversee them. The first of these organizations was Northwest MedStar, a critical care transport service and St. Luke's Rehabilitation Institute the region’s largest medical rehabilitation facility.

== Divisions and services ==
- St. Luke's Rehabilitation Institute
- Engage (Formerly Information Resource Management (IRM))
- Northwest MedStar
- Community Wellness
- Northwest TeleHealth
- Health Training
- Center of Occupation Health & Education (COHE)
- Children’s Miracle Network Hospitals
- INHS Foundation
