= Northwest MedStar =

Northwest MedStar was a non-profit medical transport company headquartered in Spokane, Washington with bases in Spokane and the Tri-Cities, Washington area. The company serviced the states of Washington, Idaho, Oregon and Montana, transporting critical-care patients using its fleet of helicopters, fixed-wing aircraft, and ambulances.

== History ==
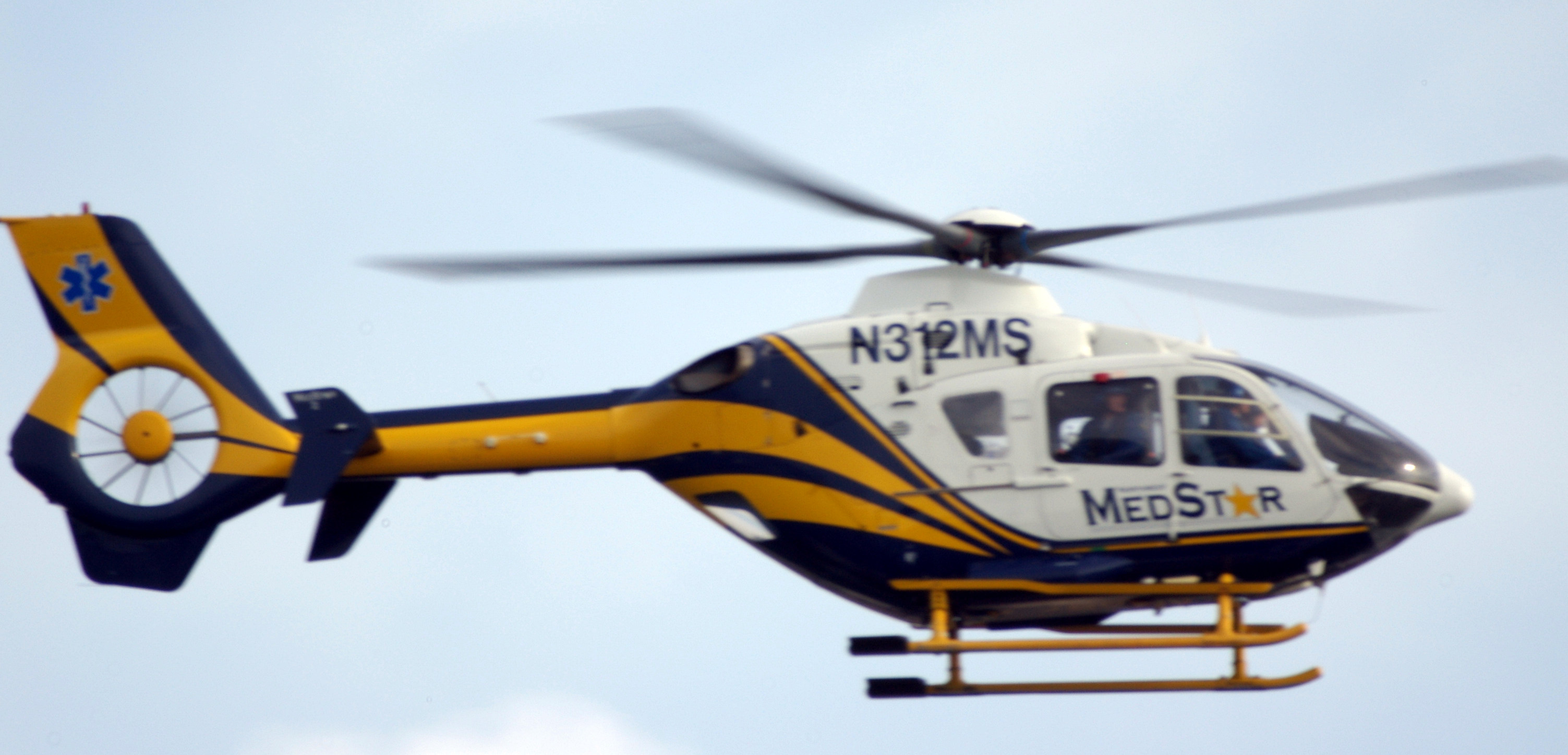
Northwest Medstar Eurocopter EC135 over Spokane

In 1994 Providence Health Care merged with Empire Health Services, creating Inland Northwest Health Services. Through this merger, the companies air ambulance services were also merged, creating Northwest MedStar. Also in 1994, the company partnered with Metro Aviation for operation services.

In 1996, Northwest MedStar became accredited by the Commission on Accreditation of Medical Transport Systems (CAMTS).

In October 2009, Northwest MedStar took over management of AirLink Critical Care Transport, owned by Cascade Healthcare Community. In 2009, Eveline Bisson, a director at the company, was named Program Director of the Year by the national Association of Air Medical Services.

In 2012, the company earned the air medical industry's Program of the Year award. Also that year, Northwest MedStar earned the Communicator of the Year Award for the work of Stephen Thompson.

In September 2015, the company hired Matt Albright as its new director. In 2016, Life Flight Network purchased the company from Inland.

MedStar offered a membership program allowing families to cover any emergency flights during the year for one price.

== Locations ==
Northwest MedStar operated multiple bases in:

- Spokane
- Pullman, WA
- Moses Lake
- Richland, WA
- Brewster, WA
- Missoula, MT
