= George Finch-Hatton =

George Finch-Hatton may refer to:

- George Finch-Hatton (MP for Rochester) (1747–1823), English politician, MP for Rochester
- George Finch-Hatton, 10th Earl of Winchilsea (1791–1858), English politician and peer
- George Finch-Hatton, 11th Earl of Winchilsea (1815–1887), British politician and peer

== See also ==
- George Finch
- George Hatton, MP for Lisburn (UK Parliament constituency)
