= Human Like a House =

Studio album by The finches
- Released: January 30, 2007
- Genre: Indie, folk
- Label: Dulc-I-Tone
- Producer: David Morgan

The finches chronology
6 Songs (2005)	Human Like a House (2007)

Professional ratings
Review scores
Source	Rating
Pitchfork	4.5/10
Tiny Mix Tapes	4/5 stars

Human Like a House is an album by American folk-pop duo The Finches. It was released on January 30, 2007. The album's packaging contained woodcut drawings created by vocalist Carolyn Pennypacker Riggs.

== Critical reception ==
Pitchfork wrote that the album's "backward thinking, front-porch-rocking-chair charisma pales in comparison to more progressive folk contemporaries." Exclaim! called Human Like a House "an album of simple compositions and gentle melodies." SF Weekly wrote that "the songs unwind slowly here, sedate melodies that soothe you into a false sense of security, but under the placid surface are hints at ancient wounds that refuse to heal."

== Track listing ==
1. "Human Like A House" - 4:07
2. "June Carter Cash" - 2:31
3. "Last Favor" - 2:38
4. "Nightswimming, AR" - 3:56
5. "Lay" - 3:33
6. "The House Under The Hill" - 4:26
7. "Two Ghosts" - 3:57
8. "Goettingen, Du" - 3:50
9. "O L A" - 4:28
10. "If We Knew" - 1:59
11. "Step Outside" - 4:43
12. "Leviathans Home!" - 3:15

== Personnel ==
- Aaron Morgan - guitar, vocals
- Carolyn Pennypacker Riggs - vocals, guitar
