= Frederick Frye Rockwell =

American garden writer

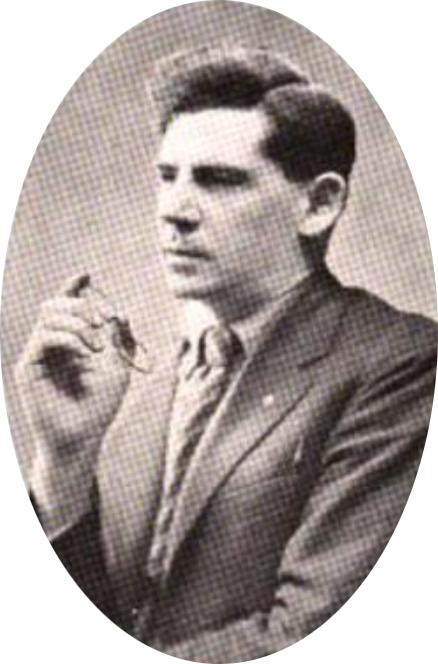
Frederick Frye Rockwell, Circa 1923

Frederick Frye Rockwell Sr. (April 2, 1884 – April 18, 1976) was an American author of gardening books, and an editor of numerous magazines and periodical columns pertaining to horticulture.

== Biography ==
Rockwell was born in Brooklyn, New York, the son of Brooklyn surgeon Dr. Francis Warren "Frank" Rockwell and Elizabeth Trowbridge Hammill. He was a founder of Home Garden Magazine in 1943 and its editor until 1953. His editing career included the positions of Sunday garden editor of The New York Times (1933–1943), senior editor of Flower Grower-Home Garden (1953–1965) and garden editor of Farm Journal, Town Journal, McCall's, and Living for Young Homemakers. He was also former national president of Men's Garden Clubs of America, and a founder of the Men's Garden Club of New York.

He wrote numerous books, including Around the Year in the Garden in 1917 which was unique for the time as it was arranged week-by-week so a head garden could comprehensively manage a garden.

He first married on Sep. 5, 1910, in Hyannis, Massachusetts, to Ethel Marjorie Hughan (sister of Jessie Wallace Hughan), of Brooklyn, New York, with whom he had three boys and a girl - Hughan Wallace Rockwell (who later took the name Frederick Hughan Rockwell), Frederick Frye "Fritz" Rockwell Jr., Donald West Rockwell, and poet Margaret Evelyn Rockwell Finch. They later divorced and on Sep. 21, 1939, in Milford, Pennsylvania, he remarried to Esther Catharine Wilson Brown (the widow of Walter Marshall Grayson), his co-author on a number of books.

He died in Orleans, Massachusetts at age 92, and is buried in Woodstock Hill Cemetery, Connecticut.

== Works ==
- Home vegetable gardening (1911)
- Gardening indoors and under glass (1912)
- The gardener's pocket manual (1914)
- Making a garden of small fruits (1914)
- The key to the land: what a city man did with a small farm (1915)
- Around the year in the garden (1917)
- The little pruning book (1917)
- Save it for winter: modern methods of canning, dehydrating, preserving and fruit for winter use (1918)
- Gladiolus (1927)
- Shrubs (1927)
- Rock gardens (1928)
- Evergreens for the small place (1928)
- Irises (1928)
- Gardening with peat moss (1928) (William Breitenbucher, co-author)
- Dahlias (1929)
- Lawns (1929)
- Your home garden and grounds (1930)
- Roses (1930)
- Peonies (1933)
- The book of bulbs (1935)
- Flower arrangement (1935) (Esther Grayson, co-author)
- Gardening indoors (1938) (Esther Grayson, co-author)
- Flower arrangement in color (1940) (Esther Grayson, co-author)
- The gardener's bug book: 1,000 insect pests and their control (1946) (co-author under Cynthia Westcott)
- The complete book of flower arrangement: for home decoration, for show competition (1947) (Esther Grayson, co-author)
- The complete book of annuals (1955) (Esther Grayson, co-author)
- The Rockwell's complete book of roses (1958) (Esther Grayson, co-author)
- The complete book of lilies (1961) (Esther Grayson, co-author)
- "The Complete Guide to Successful Gardening" (1965) (Esther C. Grayson, co-author)

== See also ==
Henry Leroy Finch Jr. (son-in-law)
