= Edward R. Finch =

American judge

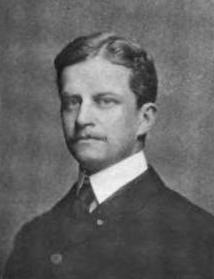
- Edward R. Finch (1903)
- Born: Edward Ridley Finch; November 15, 1873; New York City, New York, U.S.
- Died: September 16, 1965 (aged 91)
- Education: Yale College; Columbia University School of Law
- Occupations: lawyer, politician
- Political party: Republican Party
- Spouse: Mary Livingston (m. 1913-1965; his death)
- Children: Mary Delafield Noelle; Anne Crane Finch; Edward Ridley Finch, Jr.
- Parent(s): Edward Lucius; Anne Crane Ridley Finch
- Relatives: Edward F. Cox (grandson); Tricia Nixon Cox (granddaughter-in-law); Christopher Nixon Cox (great-grandson); Maturin Livingston Delafield (mother-in-law); Francis Waller Haskell (son-in-law); Howard E. Cox (son-in-law); Abraham Finch (ancestor); Charles B. Finch (nephew); Charlie Finch (great-nephew)

Edward Ridley Finch (November 15, 1873 – September 16, 1965) was an American lawyer and politician.

== Early life ==
His father was Edward Lucius and his mother was Anne Crane (née Ridley). He was a descendant of Abraham Finch, a native of England, who came to America with John Withrop's company in 1630 and settled in Massachusetts.

He graduated from Yale College in 1895, and from Columbia University School of Law in 1898.

== Political career ==
He was a Republican member of the New York State Assembly (New York Co., 5th D.) in 1902, 1903 and 1904. In 1911 he helped found The New York Young Republican Club.

He was a proponent of a 1908 election law in New York, requiring voters to sign their names when they register to vote and also when they cast their votes.

== Lawyer ==
On August 20, 1915, he was appointed by Governor Charles S. Whitman a justice of the New York Supreme Court to fill the vacancy caused by the death of Justice Delany, and was re-elected in 1915 and 1929. From 1922 on, he sat on the Appellate Division, First Dept., and in April 1931 was appointed Presiding Judge.

In 1934, he ran on the Democratic ticket for the New York Court of Appeals, and was elected to a fourteen-year term, but resigned on April 30, 1943, to resume his private law practice. Thomas D. Thacher was appointed to fill the vacancy temporarily.

== Family ==
Finch's grandson and namesake, Edward Finch Cox, is the son-in-law of former President Richard Nixon and former First Lady Pat Nixon and current chairman of the New York Republican State Committee.

New York State Assembly
Preceded by Nelson H. Henry	New York State Assembly; New York County, 5th District; 1902–1904	Succeeded by Leslie J. Tompkins
