= The Finches =

- Origin: San Francisco
- Genres: Folk pop
- Labels: Ulrike; Dulc-I-Tone
- Members: Carolyn Pennypacker Riggs; Aaron Olson
- Past members: Aaron Morgan (2004–2007); Gerry Saucedo (2008–2010); Cam Jones (2008–2010); Evan Kertman (2010–2011); Chris Mezler (2010–2011); Natalie Snoyman (2010–2011)
- Website: The Finches Official Website

The Finches is an American folk pop band, founded in San Francisco, California.

The band released their debut album Human Like a House on January 30, 2007. In February 2008, Aaron Morgan moved from The Finches. John Garmon (drums) and Gerry Saucedo (bass) joined the group. They are a trio.

== Membership ==
Band lineup (as of May 2010):

- Cam Jones: Drums, backup vocals
- Gerry Saucedo: Bass, vocals
- Carolyn Pennypacker Riggs: Guitar, lead vocals.

== Discography ==
Albums

- 2007 Human Like a House
- 2010 On Golden Hill

EPs

- 2006 Six Songs
- 2009 Dear Mili

== Sources ==
- The Finches at AllMusic
