= Baron Finch =

Baron Finch may refer to:

- Baron Finch of Daventry, a title created in 1673 and held by the Earl of Winchilsea and Nottingham
- Baron Finch of Fordwich, a title created in 1640 for Sir John Finch; extinct in 1660
