= Finch, Vanslyck, and McConville Dry Goods Company Building =

- Finch, Vanslyck and McConville Dry Goods Company Building
- U.S. National Register of Historic Places
- U.S. Historic district – Contributing property
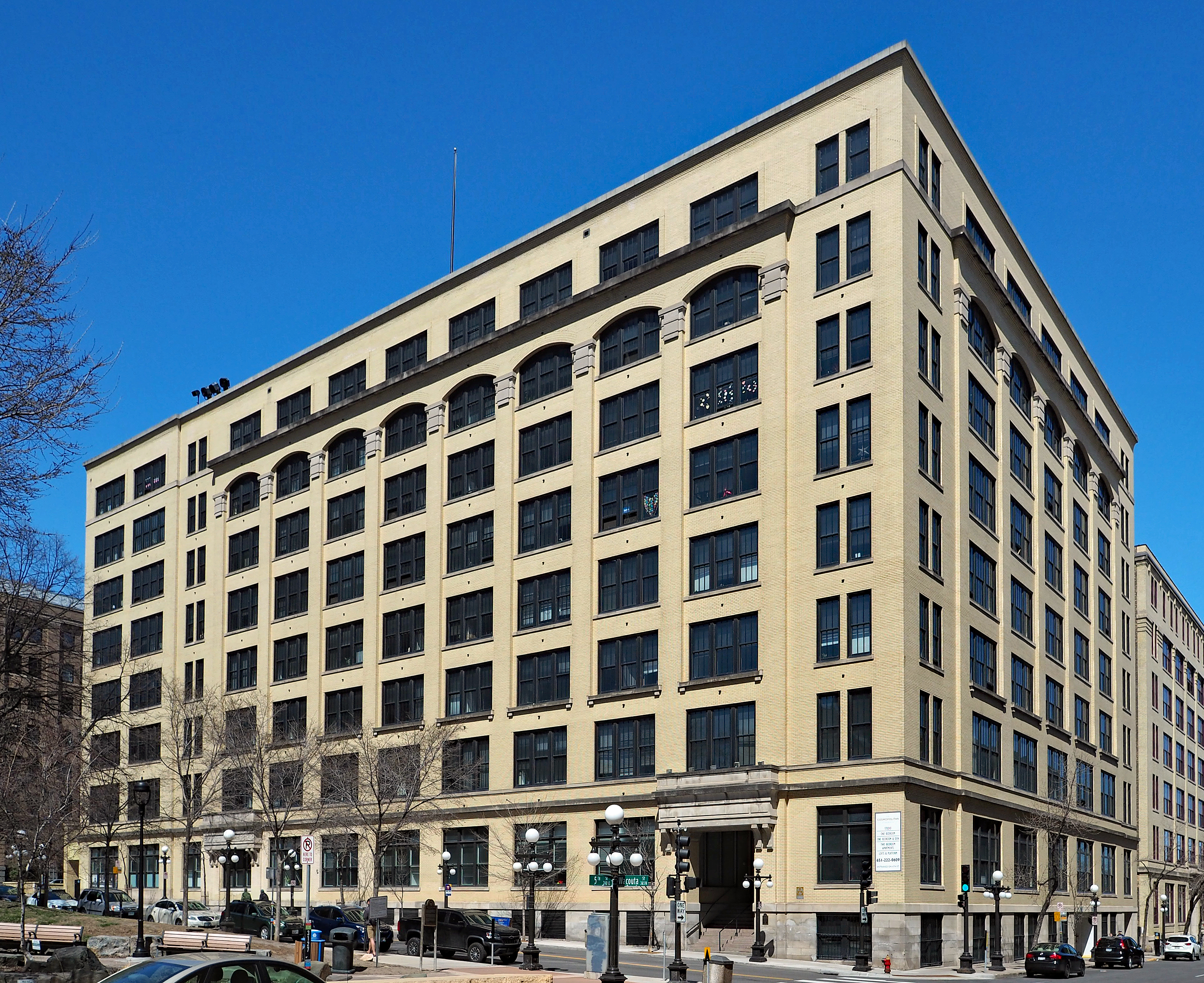
- The Finch, Vanslyck, & McConville Dry Goods Company Building from the southwest

- Location within Minnesota Location within the United States
- Location: 250 6th Street East; Saint Paul, Minnesota
- Coordinates: 44°56′59″N 93°5′13″W
- Built: 1911
- Architect: James Denson; George Grant Construction Company
- Architectural style: Classical Revival
- Part of: Lowertown Historic District (ID83000935)
- NRHP reference No.: 82004626
- Added to NRHP: February 1, 1982

The Finch, Vanslyck and McConville Dry Goods Company Building is a classical revival warehouse building designed by James E. Denson, built by George Grant Construction Company, in 1911 and 1923; it is part of Lowertown Historic District in Saint Paul, Minnesota, United States. It fronts Mears Park and is currently used as residential apartments, under the name of Cosmopolitan Apartments. It is listed on the National Register of Historic Places.
