= Knight–Finch House =

Historic house in Utah, United States

- U.S. National Register of Historic Places
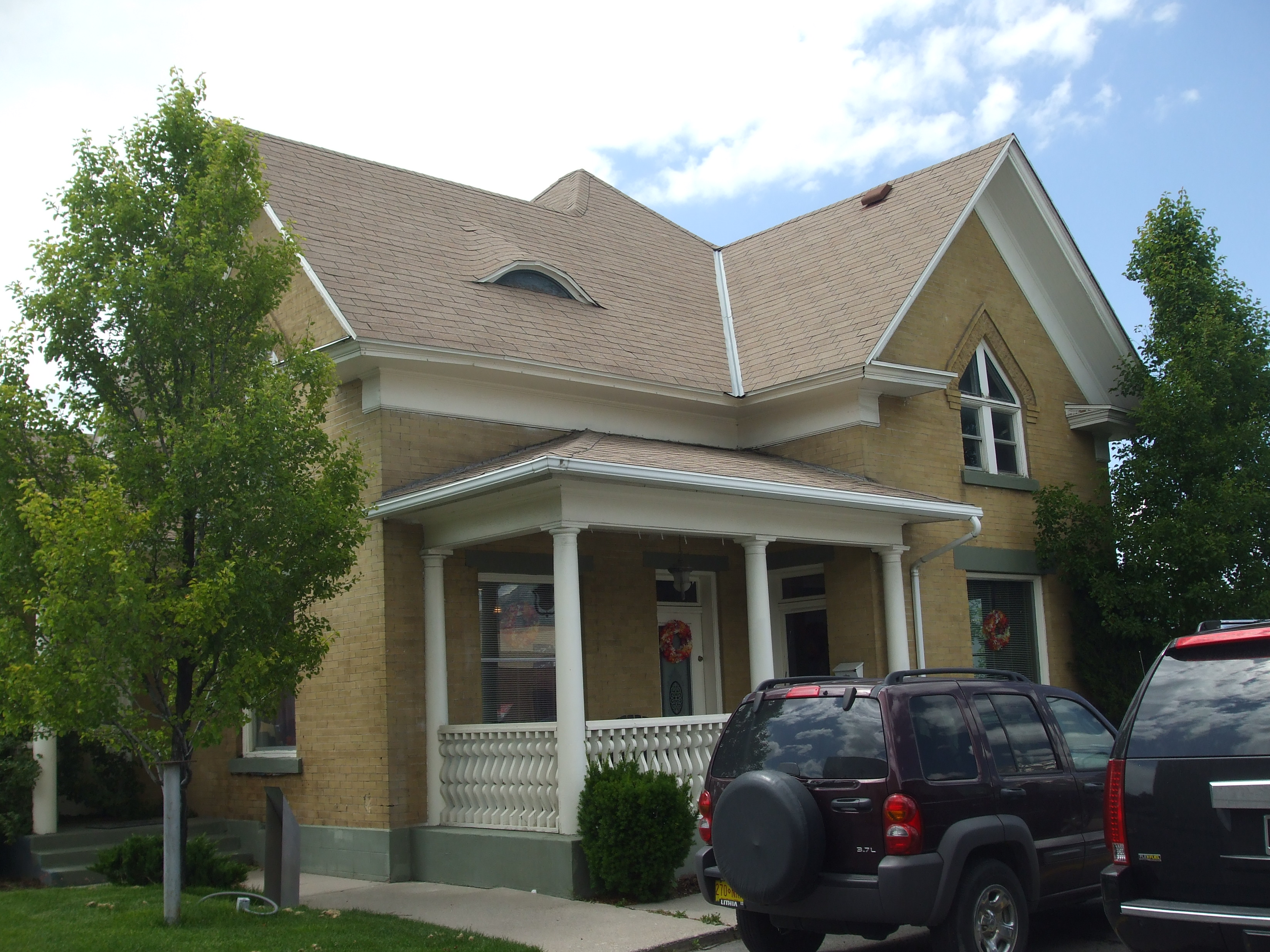

- Location within Utah Location within the United States
- Location: 212 S. State St., Orem, Utah
- Coordinates: 40°17′36″N 111°41′38″W
- Area: 0.4 acres (0.16 ha)
- Built: 1909
- Architectural style: Late Victorian
- MPS: Orem, Utah MPS
- NRHP reference No.: 98000673
- Added to NRHP: June 11, 1998

The Knight–Finch House was a house built by prominent local fruit grower and canner Newell James Knight (older brother of Utah mining magnate Jesse Knight) and his wife Eliza Stratton Knight, located in Orem, Utah. It was built in 1909, and added to the National Register of Historic Places in 1998. Joseph Finch and Ethel Davis Finch purchased the home in 1926.
