= St. Luke's Rehabilitation Institute =

Providence St. Luke's Medical Center
- Providence Health & Services
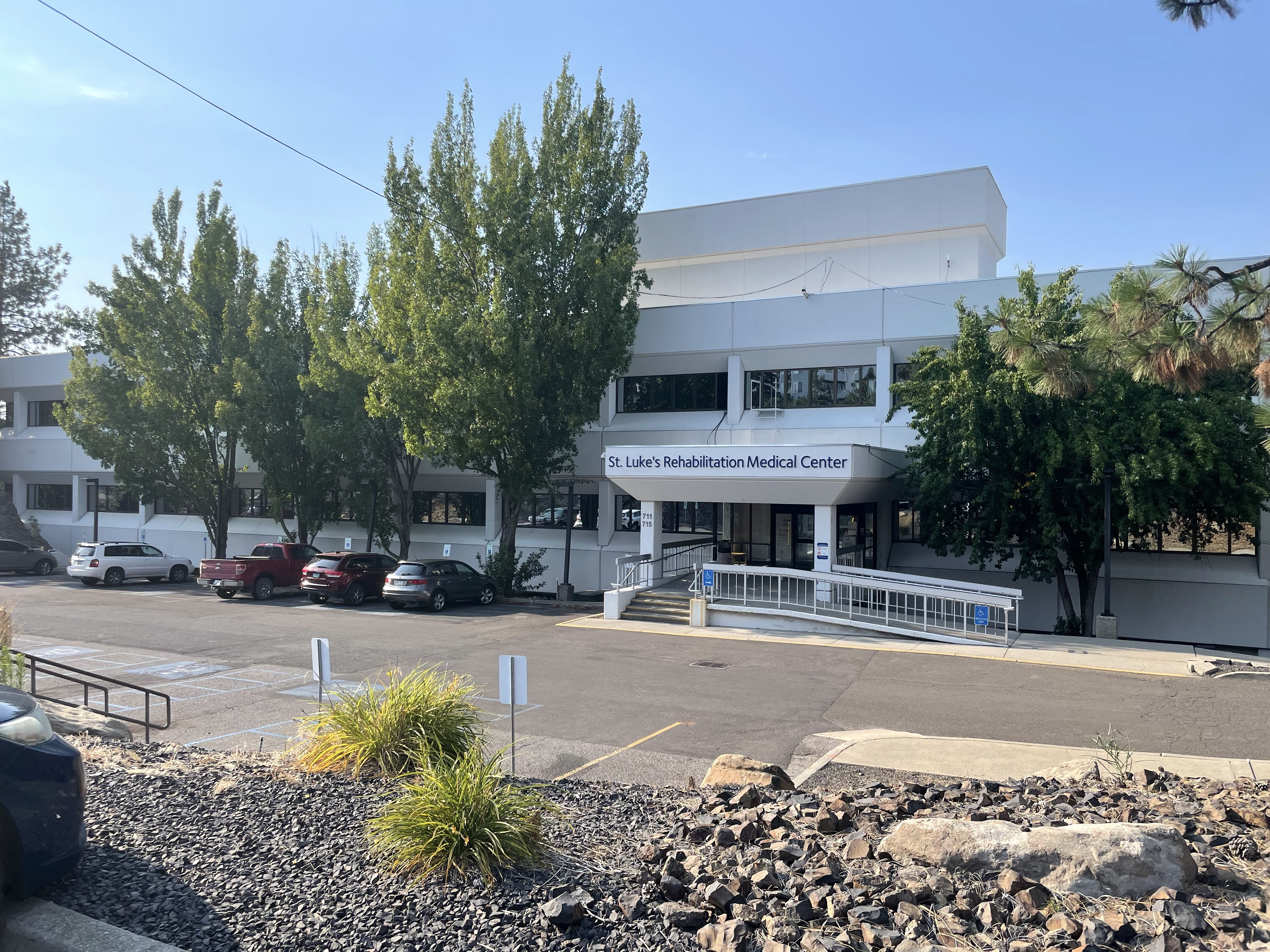

Geography
- Location: 711 S. Cowley St., Spokane, Washington, United States
- Coordinates: 47°38′59″N 117°24′26″W

Organization
- Type: Specialist

Services
- Beds: 97
- Speciality: Rehabilitation

History
- Former name: St. Luke's Rehabilitation Institute

Links
- Website: www.st-lukes.org
- Lists: Hospitals in Washington state

Providence St. Luke's Medical Center is a rehabilitation hospital that provides inpatient and outpatient care for children and adults in Washington state in the United States. It provides treatment for stroke, spinal cord injuries, orthopedic issues, brain injuries, and other injuries and illnesses. St. Luke's is the largest rehabilitation hospital in the Inland Northwest region. St. Luke's was named one of the nations "Top 100 Most Wired" hospitals in 2013.

== Location ==
The facility is located at 711 S. Cowley Street, in the East Central neighborhood of Spokane, Washington and several outpatient locations through Spokane. The main campus is located within Spokane's South Hill Medical District, which is also home to the region's two largest hospitals in Providence Sacred Heart Medical Center and Children's Hospital and MultiCare Deaconess Hospital, the campus of the former abuts St. Luke's to the west across Cowley Street.

== History ==
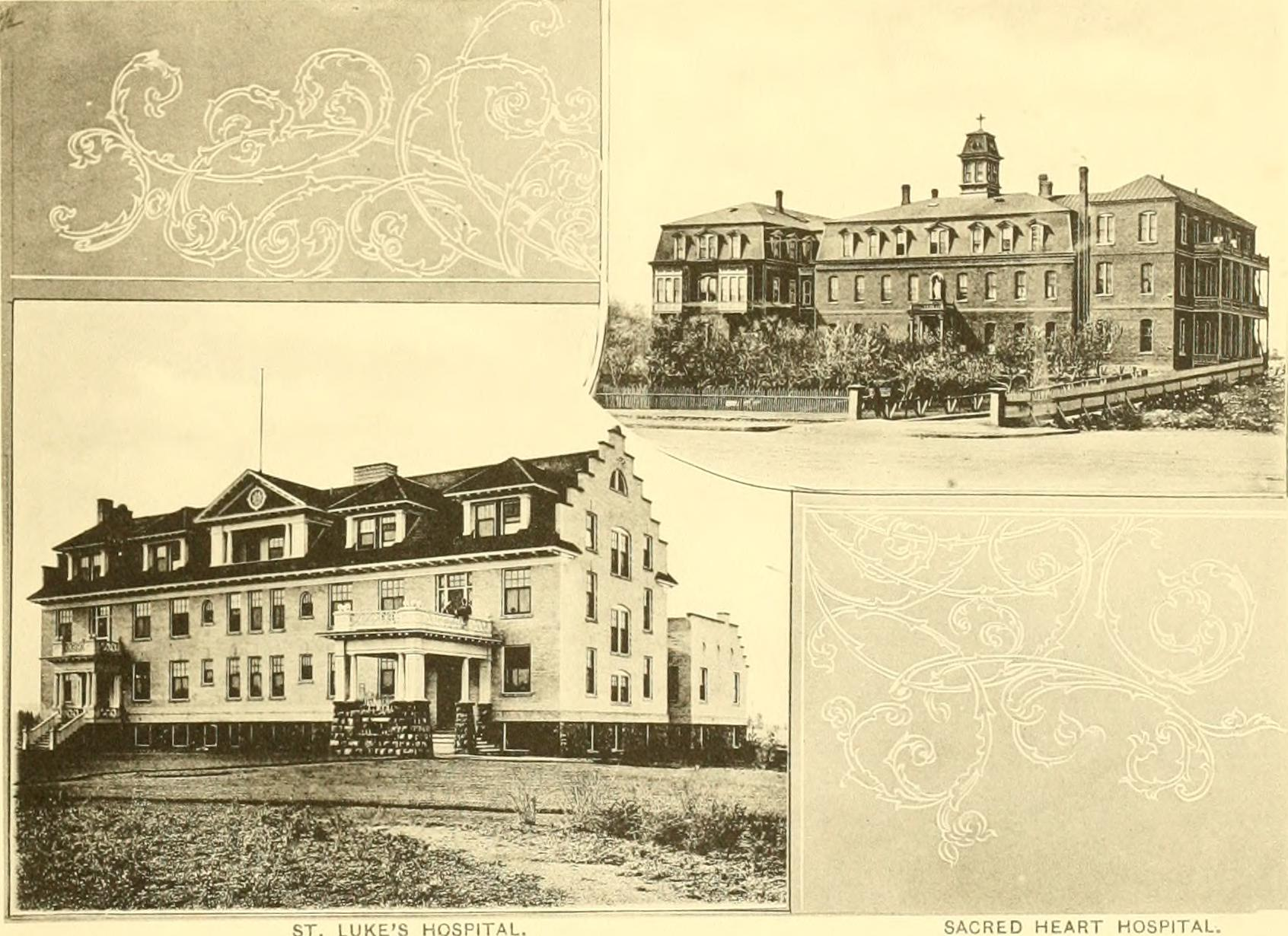
St. Luke's (left) in the 1890s

The origins of what is now St. Luke's Rehabilitation Institute began in 1897 when a group of Episcopalians founded a sanatorium called the Spokane Protestant Sanitarium at Sprague Avenue and Madison Street but later moved to another location on a triangular block on North Summit Boulevard formed by West Dean Avenue and North A Street. The hospital was supported by community fundraising, in-kind donations, volunteers, and through the philanthropy of early Spokane businessmen such as John A. Finch, Amasa Campbell, and R.L. Rutter.

The hospital focused its efforts on fulfilling underserved gaps in community healthcare and specialized in caring for those with polio, where it was a regional center for its treatment. St. Lukes opened a clinic for the treatment of "nervous diseases" and psychiatric ward in 1932 and later added a geriatric recovery and rehabilitation ward and a physical therapy department. Shriners Hospital for Crippled Children was hosted at St. Lukes starting in 1924 until it constructed its own building in 1939. The hospital had a resident nursing school through the mid 20th century and their first nursing student living quarters at 852 N. Summit Boulevard still stands and is now a condominium.

In 1970, the hospital moved into a newly constructed complex at 711 S. Cowley Street on the lower South Hill Medical District. A 1985 merger with Deaconess reorganized it into Empire Health Services and it received its current name in 1992, focusing its organizational mission on recovery and rehabilitation. It is the largest stand-alone medical rehabilitation facility in the Inland Northwest region. In 2021, St. Luke's along with Inland Northwest Health Services (INHS) was fully absorbed and integrated into the Providence Health & Services system and is now known as Providence St. Luke's Rehabilitation Medical Center.

== Accreditations ==
St. Luke's Rehabilitation Institute is accredited by the Joint Commission and the Commission on Accreditation of Rehabilitation Facilities (CARF) for care of adults and children diagnosed with Brain Injury, Spinal Cord Injury, and Stroke.

== Services ==
- Physical Therapy
- Speech Therapy
- Recreation Therapy
- Respiratory Therapy
- Occupational Therapy
- Vocational Rehabilitation
- Neuromuscular Medicine (Diagnosis and Treatment)
- Inpatient Rehabilitation
