= James W. Finch House =

Historic house in California, United States

- U.S. National Register of Historic Places
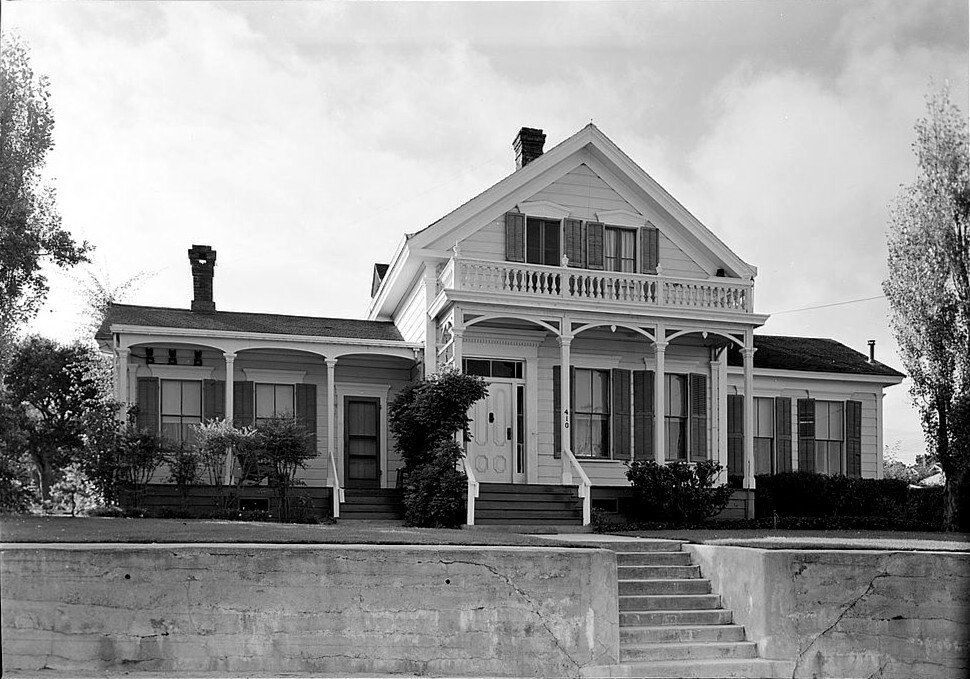

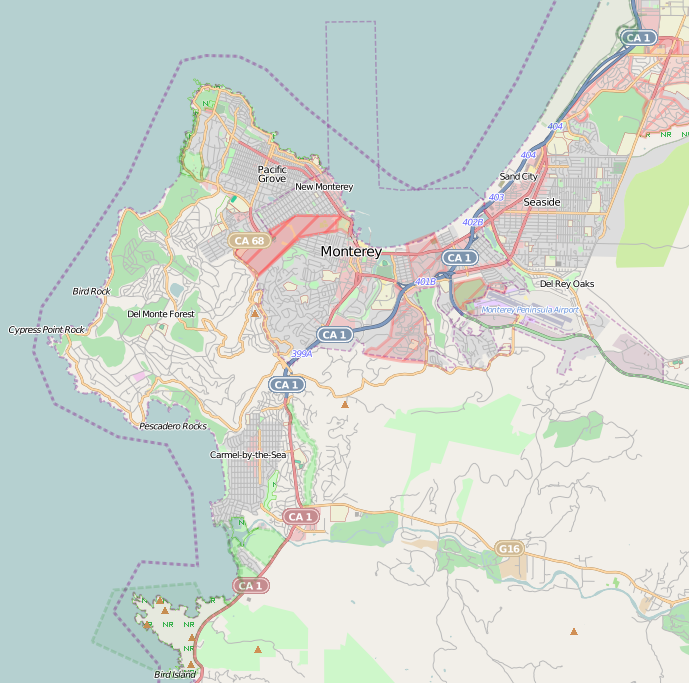
- Location within Monterey Peninsula Location within California Location within the United States
- Location: 410 Monroe Street; Monterey, California; United States
- Coordinates: 36°36′4″N 121°53′59″W
- Area: 0.2 acres (0.081 ha)
- Built: 1870
- Architectural style: Classical Revival
- NRHP reference No.: 82000974
- Added to NRHP: October 19, 1982

The James W. Finch House, known also as the Finch-Fleischer House, is a historic house in Monterey, California that is listed on the National Register of Historic Places (NRHP).

Located at 410 Monroe Street in Monterey, it was built in 1870. The house is significant as one of few surviving examples of early American architecture in Monterey, as opposed to the Spanish/Mexican adobe style of other Monterey buildings of the same era. The house includes Classical Revival stylings with other, eclectic stylistic features.

The house was built by rancher and stovemaker James William Finch and by Charles Finch for their mother, who lived in the house until 1881, after which James and his wife lived there and extended the house. James' daughter Alma and her husband Charles Fleischer lived there later. A notable later renter was artist Charles Rollo Peters.

The house was documented by the Historic American Buildings Survey in 1964. It was listed on the National Register of Historic Places in 1982.
