= Charlotte Mensah =

Ghanaian-British hairstylist

- Born: Charlotte Irene Mensah; May 1970 (age 56)
- Education: London College of Fashion
- Years active: 1986–present
- Children: 2
- Website: www.charlottemensah.com

Charlotte Irene Mensah (born May 1970) is a British/Ghanaian hairstylist. She is the founder and creative director of Hair Lounge, on London's Portobello Road. In November 2018 she became the first black woman to be inducted into the British Hairdressing Hall of Fame.

== Early life and education ==
Mensah was born in Hampstead, North West London. She spent her early childhood with her grandparents in Accra before returning to London at age 11. She honed her skills styling her younger sister's hair after their mother died when Mensah was 13.

A school counsellor suggested Mensah go into the field professionally, and at age 16 in 1986, she began working at Splinters, Britain's first black hair dresser. She went on to study Hair Theory at the London College of Fashion.

== Career ==
In 1999, Mensah opened her first salon, Hair Lounge, in Kilburn, London. The salon later moved to Notting Hill, where she continues to work.

In 2016, Mensah launched a product line of hair oils and mists.

== Personal life ==
Mensah lives in Notting Hill with her husband and their two children.

== Awards and recognition ==
Some of the awards she has won for her work include:

- 2012 - Weave Stylist of the Year and Hair Stylist of the Year at Beauty/Sensationnel Hair Awards
- 2013 - UK's best Afro Hairdresser of the Year at the British Hairdressing Awards
- 2014 - UK's best Afro Hairdresser of the Year at the British Hairdressing Awards
- 2017 - UK's best Afro Hairdresser of the Year at the British Hairdressing Awards

In 2018, Mensah was the first Black woman inducted into the British Hairdressing Awards Hall of Fame.

In February 2024, she was interviewed about her life and career on the BBC World Service's Witness History.

== Philanthropy ==
=== Charlotte Mensah Academy ===
She founded the Charlotte Mensah Academy, through which she organises workshops to train young, less fortunate individuals in Ghana her skill.

=== Ladies of Visionary Empowerment (LOVE) ===
She also founded the Ladies of Visionary Empowerment which aims at furthering education opportunities and empowerment for young women in Africa.
