= MV Finch =

The MV Finch, also known as the Spirit of Rachel Corrie, was a blockade runner staffed by anti-Israel activists from Malaysia, India, Ireland, and Canada attempting to deliver supplies to Gaza in May 2011 ahead of the Freedom Flotilla II mission in late June.

== Mission ==
The ship's mission began on May 11, leaving from Greece, and was to deliver construction materials necessary to restore the sewage system. The ship broke the blockade and was within 400 metres of the Gaza shore before it was attacked with gunfire by the Israeli Navy. The Egyptian interim government refused the boat access to dock in El-Arish, leaving it stranded off the coast. The ship's members returned home to Malaysia in early June.

== Sponsorship ==
It was sponsored by the Perdana Global Peace Foundation, founded by former Malaysian Prime Minister Mahathir Mohamad.

== Opposition to future aid flotillas ==
The Israeli Navy has threatened the follow-up mission of Freedom Flotilla Two, scheduled to have a fleet of 15 ships and boats along with 1500 activists. Israel also threatened Inmarsat if they provide satellite services to the group. U.N. Secretary-General Ban Ki-Moon has called for it to be blocked.
