= John A. Finch Memorial Nurses Home =

- U.S. National Register of Historic Places
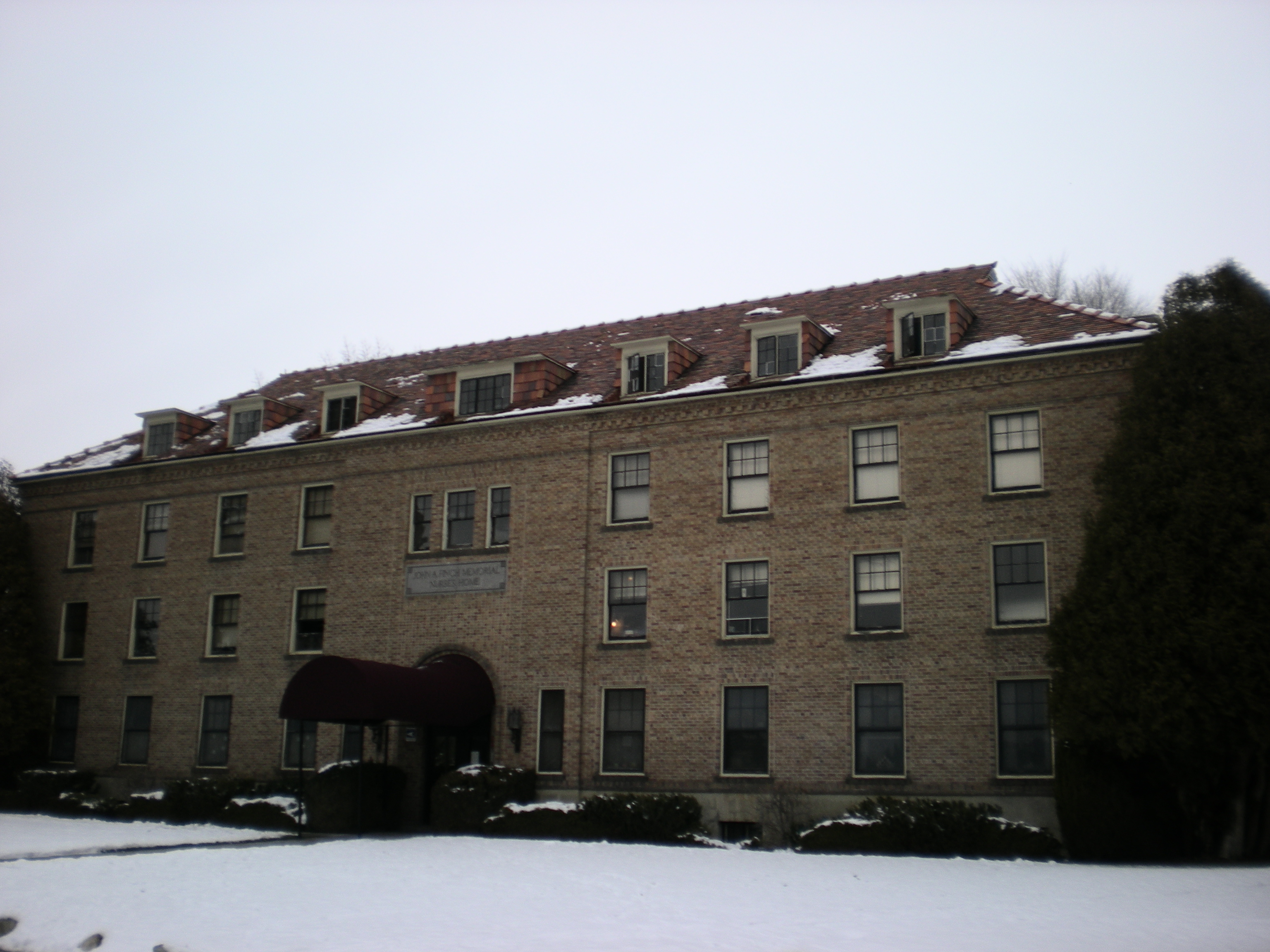

- Location within Washington (state)
- Location: N. 852 Summit Blvd., Spokane, Washington
- Coordinates: 47°39′57″N 117°27′16″W
- Area: less than one acre
- Architect: Whitehouse & Price
- Architectural style: Late 19th and 20th Century Revivals, Italian Romanesque Revival
- NRHP reference No.: 91000631
- Added to NRHP: May 28, 1991

The John A. Finch Memorial Nurses Home, also known as Finch Hall, is a building in West Central, Spokane, Washington. From its construction in 1929 through the 1960s, it was used as a nurses' dormitory for the diploma training program at St. Luke's Hospital. Designed by Spokane architects Whitehouse & Price, the building was listed on the National Register of Historic Places in 1991. John A. Finch, for whom the building is named, was a mining magnate and philanthropist who provided much of the funding for construction.

The building is the last remnant of the three diploma nursing schools in Spokane. Having elements of the Romanesque Revival style, it is made of reinforced concrete faced with tan bricks and is three and a half stories tall.

== History ==
St. Luke's began their two (later expanded to three) year in-hospital nurse's training program in 1899. During World War I, the shortage of trained nurses led to hospitals in Spokane expanding their programs and building separate dormitory buildings like this one. As the nursing profession grew more complex with advancing technology, training began to shift to colleges and universities, rather than nursing schools. Along with the two other hospital programs in Spokane, St. Luke's School of Nursing closed in 1965, and merged into the Intercollegiate Center for Nursing Education. The building is now used as apartment space.
