= Finch Building (Scranton, Pennsylvania) =

Historic place in Pennsylvania, United States

- U.S. National Register of Historic Places
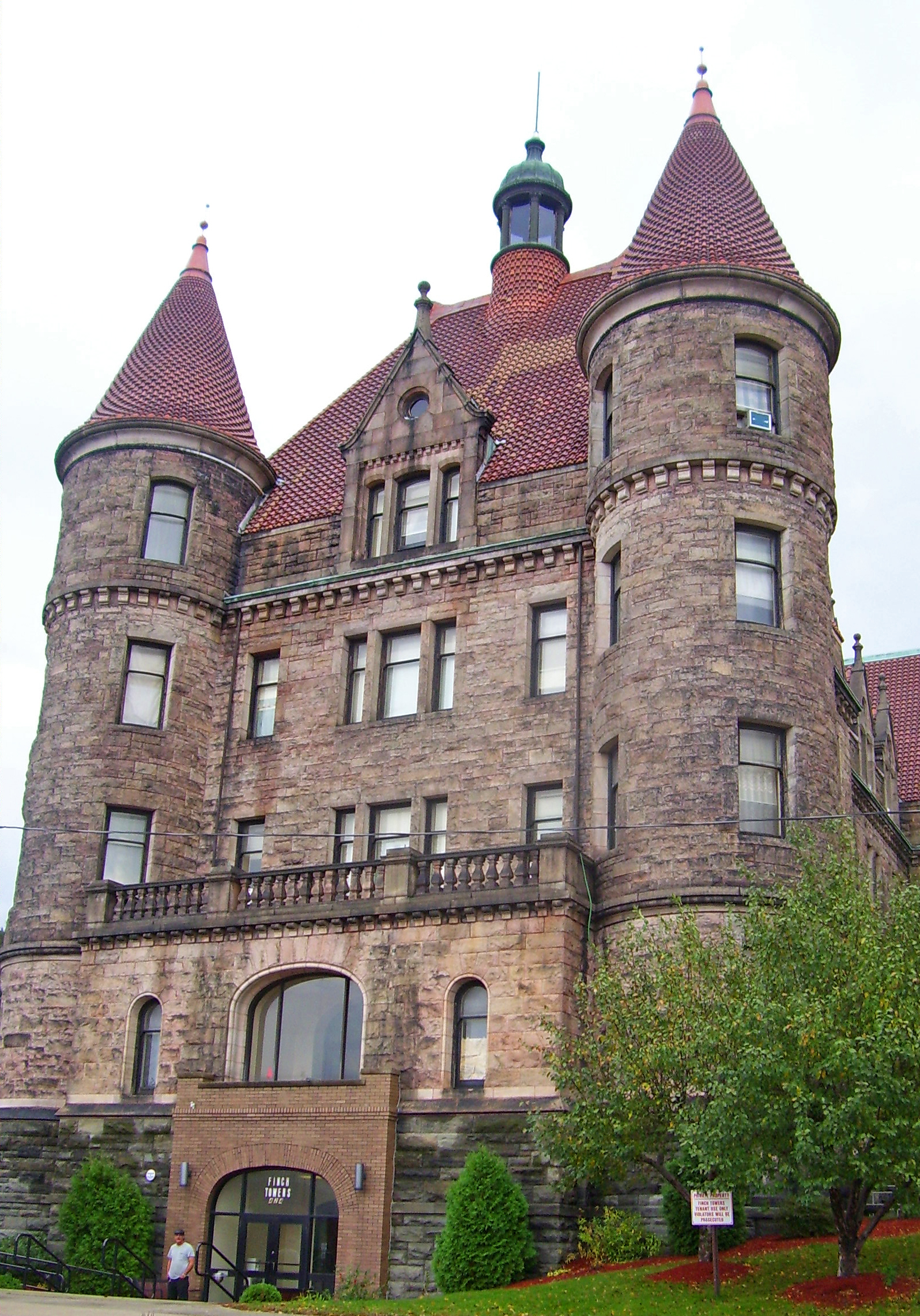
- Building front elevation in 2007
- Location: Scranton, PA
- Coordinates: 41°24′38″N 75°39′38″W
- Built: 1899
- Architect: William Scott-Collins
- Architectural style: Renaissance Revival
- NRHP reference No.: 76001644
- Added to NRHP: 1976

The Finch Building is located on Wyoming Avenue, just north of US 11 and PA 307, in downtown Scranton, Pennsylvania, United States. It is a stone building designed by William Scott-Collins in the Renaissance revival style and completed in 1899.

It takes its name from the Finch Manufacturing Company, a maker of finished steel products such as manhole covers that had been based in the city for much of the later 19th century. Its first occupant was the International Correspondence School, a business that offered study-by-mail classes to the many coal miners in the Northeastern Pennsylvania region. The school, founded in 1894, had quickly outgrown its offices at the nearby Coal Exchange Building and needed the space. Later it was used as offices for the Hudson Coal Company.

In 1976 it was added to the National Register of Historic Places. Today it has been remodeled into an apartment building called Finch Towers.
