= John A. Finch =

American politician

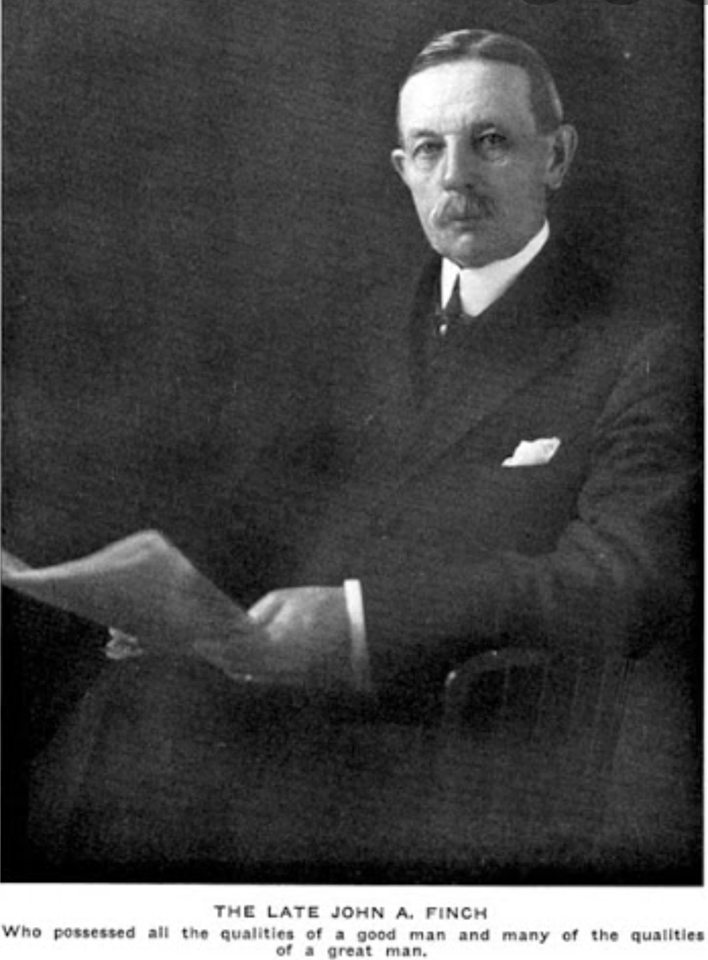
- Portrait of John A. Finch
- Born: 1852; England
- Died: June 20, 1915 (aged 62–63); Hayden Lake, Idaho
- Occupations: Businessman philanthropist

John Aylard Finch (1852 in England – June 20, 1915, in Hayden Lake, Idaho) was an affluent English immigrant, businessman and philanthropist in the Inland Northwest region of the United States.

== Early life ==
John Aylard Finch was born in England in 1852 to parents Sophia Aylard Finch and William Finch. When John was 5-years-old, the family immigrated to Cleveland, Ohio where he would begin school when he was eight. He finished school at 13 and began working in the iron and steel industries. His work took him to Montreal, Canada, Chicago, Illinois, Denver, Colorado, and finally Leadville, Colorado, where he began his career in mining and met longtime business partner Amasa B. Campbell.

== Career ==
=== Mining ===
In 1891 Finch and a syndicate of capitalists including Campbell and Patsy Clark incorporated Hecla Mining in Burke, Idaho.

Finch served as a principal implementing the policies of his district's Mine Owners Association (MOA). In early 1892, the MOA reduced pay for "low skilled" underground workers by $0.50 per day. Coeur d'Alene district miners asserted that all underground work is equally dangerous and refused to work if their workmates weren't properly compensated.

In July 1892, Finch, on behalf of the MOA, was found to have been communicating with Thiel Detective Service Co. detective Charlie Siringo, who was contracted as an undercover informant for the purpose of unionbusting. In response, Union members organized the 1892 Coeur d'Alene labor strike which culminated in a gunfight between Union members, mine guards and strikebreakers at Finch's Gem Mine and the dynamiting of an abandoned ore mine nearby, which killed several people. On July 13, the Governor of Idaho declared Martial Law in Shoshone County which lasted for four months. General Thomas H. Ruger telegraphed that 200 additional troops had been ordered from Fort Keogh. The governor had telegraphed General James F. Curtis to arrest all persons implicated in the recent outrages. The local jail could not house all of the striking workers, and a number of miners were confined in a large outdoor bullpen.

Undercover Thiel detectives would continue to provide Union secrets to Finch & Campbell Mining Firm as late as April 1901. With the help of Siringo's testimony, 18 Union leaders were convicted in relation to the Coeur d'Alene miners' dispute, including future Western Federation of Miners founder and Industrial Workers of the World leader George Pettibone. By 1893, Finch & Campbell had expanded their mining enterprises to British Columbia.

=== Politics ===
In 1891, Finch was elected to the Idaho Senate.

=== Other business ventures ===
As his investments in mining began to pay off, Finch went on to become president of the Coeur d’Alene Hardware Company White & Bender, Blalock Fruit Company of Walla Walla and the National Lumber & Box Company of Hoquiam. He named Campbell vice president of all of these companies. He was also a significant stockholder in the Davenport Hotel when it opened in 1914.

== Personal life ==
In 1896, Finch married Spokane socialite Charlotte Swingler.

In 1898, prolific Spokane architect Kirtland Cutter designed Finch Mansion in the Georgian Revival style. It was one of three Cutter homes built on that block in 1898 and set the tone for architecture in Spokane. In 1903 Finch commissioned Cutter to design his Hayden Lake, Idaho estate in the Swiss Chalet style. The original chalet burned down in 1930, shortly after being sold by Finch's widow in 1926.

Finch was the president of Spokane's first country club and donated land to Saint Luke's Hospital and the Spokane Children's Home.

== Legacy ==
Finch died on June 20, 1915, at his home in Hayden Lake, Idaho. He left 60% of his wealth to his wife and the rest to local charities and to "public good."

The John A. Finch Memorial Nurses Home in Spokane, Washington opened in 1929.

The John A. Finch School opened Monday, January 28, 1924.

In 1947 the city of Spokane was gifted $250,000 for the purpose of developing the 65 acre John A. Finch Arboretum.
