= Henry Leroy Finch Jr. =

American philosopher

Henry Leroy Finch, Jr. (Roy Finch)(August 8, 1921 – August 22, 1997) was an American pacifist and philosopher. A conscientious objector in Civilian Public Service (CPS) camps during World War II, he played a prominent role in the peace movement during the 1940s and 1950s. His works on philosophy include four books on Ludwig Wittgenstein and a posthumous book on Simone Weil, as well as edited volumes on Tolstoy and Einstein. In both pacifism and philosophy, Finch was instrumental in founding and leading influential organizations including National Public Radio ]and the American Weil Society. He served as chair of the War Resisters League from 1953 to 1959, and an editor of Liberation (magazine) from its founding in 1956 until 1959.

== Early life and education ==
Roy Finch was born in New York City as the oldest child of Henry Le Roy Finch and Mary Farquhar Baker. His maternal grandmother, Mrs. Stephen Baker Finch, was active in the New York Mission Society.. His grandfather was Stephen Baker, President of the Bank of the Manhattan Company. He had three brothers: Charles B. Finch Jr., Stephen Baker Finch, and John Finch. He attended the Buckley School, Phillips Academy, and Yale University (B.A., 1940), where he was Vice-Chairman of the Yale News. During World War II he registered as a conscientious objector. After the war he earned a Ph.D. in Philosophy at Columbia University, writing a dissertation on the pre-Socratic philosophers.

== Scholarship in Philosophy and Religion ==
Finch's four books on Ludwig Wittgenstein are distinctive in situating Wittgenstein's philosophy within a spiritual and religious context, with particular attention to the perspectives of Gurdjieff and Simone Weil and the religious traditions of Buddhism and Taoism. Nicholas F. Gier points out that Finch's interpretation of Wittgenstein’s "forms of life" understands the forms as deeply integral to human existence, in constrast to prior interpretations such as Levi-Strauss's, which use neo-structuralist or sociological framing. Finch founded the first Seminars in World Religion at Columbia University, was active in the Gurdjieff Foundation, and organized the first conference on the Buddhist thinker Dogen held in the United States. A founder of the American Weil Society, he wrote his final book, Simone Weil and the Intellect of Grace, on Weil. It was published posthumously in 1999. Finch was a professor of philosophy at Sarah Lawrence College from 1952 to 1972 and chair of the Department of Philosophy at Hunter College from 1973 to 1989.

== Pacifism ==
Known as Roy Finch in pacifist circles, Henry Leroy Finch, Jr. was a pacifist and conscientious objector during World War II. He served in Civilian Public Service (CPS) Camp 11 (Ashburnham, Massachusetts) and Camp 37 (Coleville, California), and with CPS Unit 41 (Williamsburg, Virginia). The first two were engaged in U.S. Forest Service efforts, and the latter was a mental hospital. After the war, Finch worked as an editor for Alternative and Liberation. For a time he was involved with the American Forum for Socialist Education, but his primary affiliations were with the Fellowship of Reconciliation and War Resisters League. Finch served as chair of the War Resisters League from 1953 to 1959, presenting the first WRL Peace Award to Jeannette Rankin and bringing Bayard Rustin, Martin Luther King Jr., and A. J. Muste to the organization as honored speakers. He presided over the controversial hiring of Bayard Rustin as Executive Secretary of the WRL in 1953, after Rustin had been forced to resign from the Fellowship of Reconciliation as a consequence of being arrested for homosexual activity. Finch was involved in the formation of Public Radio in the United States and specifically WBAI Radio in New York, where he hosted a pacifist radio show until the mid-1950s. After leaving the WRL he remained active in the peace movement, including participating in the 1963 March on Washington.

== Personal life ==
Finch married Margaret Evelyn Rockwell in 1947. They parented five children: Margaret (Julie) Finch, Martha Rijn Finch, Mary Dabney Baker Finch, Annie Ridley Crane Finch (Annie Finch), and Henry Leroy Finch III (Roy Finch).

== Bibliography ==
Finch's books include:

- The Vision of Wittgenstein. Vega Books, 2003.
- Simone Weil and the Intellect of Grace. Ed. Martin Andic, Preface by Annie Finch. Continuum International Publishing Group Ltd., 2001
- Wittgenstein (The Spirit of Philosophy). Element Books, Element Masters of Philosophy Series, 1995
- Wittgenstein - The Later Philosophy: An Exposition of the "Philosophical Investigations. New York: Humanities Press, 1977
- Wittgenstein - The Early Philosophy: An Exposition of the "Tractatus. New York: Humanities Press, 1971
- Conversations With Einstein. (Ed., with Alexander Moszkowski and Henry L. Brose. New York : Horizon Press, 1970
- Conversations With Tolstoi. (Ed.). New York : Horizon Press, 1968
- The Complete Essays of Francis Bacon: Including the New Atlantis and Novum Organum. (Editor and Introduction). Washington Square Press, 1963

Articles

- "Response to John W. Cook." Philosophical Investigations 4 (3):74-77.
- "Wittgenstein’s Last Word". International Philosophical Quarterly 15 (4):383-395.

== Archives ==
Henry L. Finch's papers on pacifism are held in the Swarthmore College Peace Collection. His philosophical papers are held in the archive of his daughter Annie Finch in the Beinecke Rare Book and Manuscript Library at Yale University.

== See also ==
Jessie Wallace Hughan (grandaunt-in-law, founder of War Resisters League)

Frederick Frye Rockwell (father-in-law)
