= USS Finch =

Two ships in the United States Navy have been named USS Finch. The first ship was named for the bird and the second ship for Joseph W. Finch Jr.

- The first USS Finch (AM-9) was commissioned in 1918 and sunk in enemy action in 1942; salvaged by the IJN and sunk 1945
- The second USS Finch (DE-328) was named shortly after the first USS Finch went down in battle. She was commissioned in 1943 and decommissioned in 1947
