= Justice Finch =

Justice Finch may refer to:

- Edward R. Finch (1873–1965), justice of the New York Supreme Court, and an associate justice of the New York Court of Appeals
- Francis Miles Finch (1827–1907), associate justice of the New York Court of Appeals
- James A. Finch Jr. (1907–1988), associate justice of the Missouri Supreme Court
