= Lady in the Death House =

1944 film by Steve Sekely

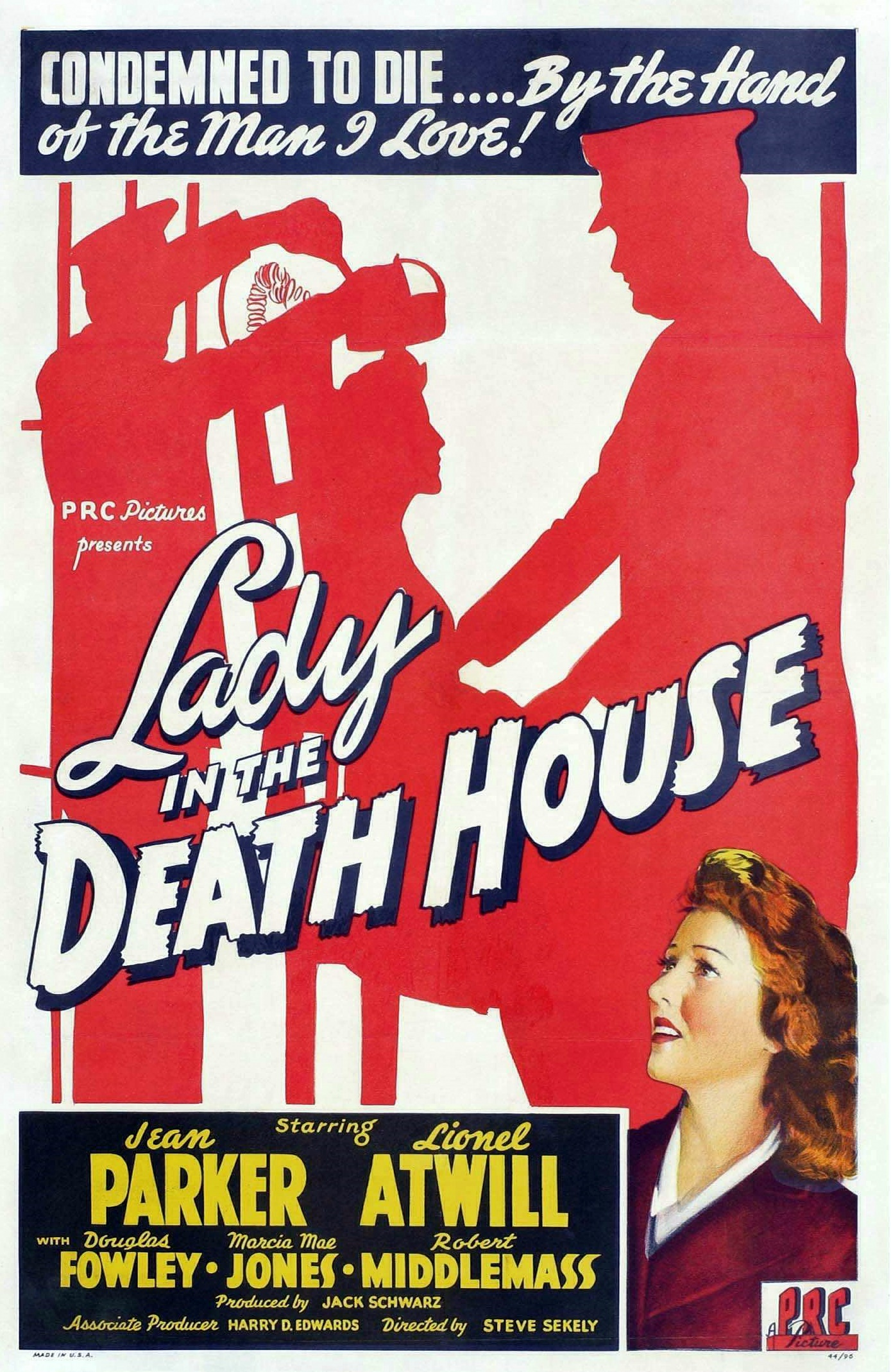
- Theatrical release poster
- Directed by: Steve Sekely
- Screenplay by: Harry O. Hoyt
- Based on: story by Frederick C. Davis
- Produced by: Harry D. Edwards (associate producer); Jack Schwarz (producer)
- Starring: Jean Parker; Lionel Atwill
- Cinematography: Gus Peterson
- Edited by: Robert O. Crandall
- Music by: Jan Gray
- Distributed by: Producers Releasing Corporation
- Release date: March 15, 1944
- Running time: 56 minutes
- Country: United States
- Language: English

Lady in the Death House is a 1944 American crime film directed by Steve Sekely and starring Jean Parker and Lionel Atwill.

== Plot ==
Mary Kirk Logan is led from her cell to the electric chair, to be "killed by the hand of the man I love."

A psychologist and criminologist, Charles Finch, tells her story. They first meet in a bar when Mary's dress catches fire. Dr. Bradford, having drinks with Finch, helps extinguish the fire. He takes Mary home and they fall in love.

Bradford is a scientist who hopes to develop a way to revive dead tissue. He works as an executioner for the state. Mary will not marry him unless he quits this profession.

A blackmailer is killed in Mary's apartment and she is arrested and tried. Her teenaged sister Suzy is the key to the case. Finch gets her to identify the real killer, but a race against time begins to find the governor so he can stop the execution. Bradford holds off the warden and guards until Finch can save the day.

== Cast ==
- Jean Parker as Mary Kirk Logan
- Lionel Atwill as Charles Finch
- Douglas Fowley as Dr. Dwight 'Brad' Bradford
- Marcia Mae Jones as Suzy Kirk Logan
- Robert Middlemass as State's Attorney
- Cy Kendall as Detective
- John Maxwell as Robert Snell
- George Irving as Gregory
- Forrest Taylor as Warden
- Sam Flint as Governor Harrison
- Dick Curtis as Willis Millen
