= Bob Finch =

Businessperson

- Occupations: Co-founder, Talis Capital; Co-founder, Finch Investments
- Spouse: Rohini Finch
- Website: http://www.finchinvest.com

Robert 'Bob' Finch was Head of Trading at leading energy trading company The Vitol Group until June 2015. He was born in the London suburb of Kingston-upon-Thames in 1954 as the son of an RAF fighter pilot. After leaving school at the age of 17, Finch started working as entry level junior at Petrofina. Over the years he worked his way up to the position of trader. Finch joined Vitol in 1979 as the Rotterdam-based trader began its international growth. Oil trading was in its infancy then. For many years, he was head of trading and served on its board for 15 years. Finch helped with establishing Vitol’s entry into the coal markets in 2007. In January 2012, Finch was involved in the agreement between Vitol Anker International BV and Vitol Mauritius Limitada (“Vitol”) and Grindrod Limited of South Africa (“Grindrod”), whereby Vitol gained a 35% interest in the company which owns the Maputo coal terminal concession. In addition Vitol and Grindrod entered into a partnership (65% Vitol / 35% Grindrod) to combine their respective sub Saharan coal trading businesses.

Finch has five children. He is an avid supporter of Chelsea Football Club.

== Business interests ==
Finch is the co-founder of the venture capital firm Talis Capital, which invests in a broad range of early-stage technology companies in the UK, US and Europe, typically at seed to Series B stage. Talis Capital is known for leading cybersecurity firm Darktrace's Series A in 2015, as well as for its investments in Onfido, Pirate.com, Luminance, iwoca, Garten and Ÿnsect.

== Charitable work ==
Finch is a supporter of multiple charities. In 2005, he co-founded the charity Oil Aid in 2005

with Michael Holland and Marc Thompson of Tullett Prebon, which has supported a variety of charities, and raised millions of pounds for good causes. Their main focus is on medical and children's charities, including Cherry Lodge Cancer Care Centre, the Willow Foundation and The Prince's Trust.[5]

The same year, Bob Finch and his wife Rohini set-up the Generations Charity. Their aim is to provide a better quality of life for disabled, ill or disadvantaged children in the UK as well as abroad.

Finch is also an ambassador for the World Land Trust, an international conservation charity, and a supporter of Lashings Wold XI, a cricket club in Kent, England.
