= Charles B. Finch =

American businessman and lawyer

Charles Baker Finch
- Born: March 5, 1920; New York, New York, U.S.
- Died: July 15, 1996 (aged 76)
- Occupations: Energy industry executive Attorney
- Spouse(s): Angela Havens, m. 1943
- Children: Charles Baker Finch, Jr. William Finch
- Parent(s): Mary Farquhar Baker; Henry Le Roy Finch

Charles Baker Finch (March 5, 1920 – July 15, 1996) was an American businessman and lawyer. He served as president and CEO of Allegheny Power System from 1971 to 1985.

== Early life and education ==
Charles Finch was the second son of Henry Le Roy Finch and Mary Farquhar Baker and the grandson of Stephen Baker, President of the Bank of the Manhattan Company. He had three brothers: Henry Leroy Finch Jr., Stephen Baker Finch and John Finch.

Finch grew up in Manhattan and attended the Buckley School and Phillips Academy, where he was awarded the George Lauder Prize for Excellence in English History prior to his graduation in 1937. He attended Yale University (B.A., 1941) and Yale Law School (L.L.B., 1944), where he was comment editor of the law review the Yale Law Journal.

== Career ==
After graduating from law school, Finch argued multiple cases before the United States Supreme Court. He eventually joined Allegheny Power System where he was elected president and chief executive officer in 1971. He later also became Chairman of the Board at Allegheny. He served as CEO and chairman until he was succeeded by Klaus Bergman as CEO in 1985. Finch continued to serve as Chairman at Allegheny for several years.

== Charitable work and politics ==
Finch sat on the boards of dozens of foundations, colleges, and companies, notable among them the Josiah Macy, Jr Foundation and Cooper Union, where a lab is named after him. He was elected president of the New York City Mission in 1956 and served in that role for three years. He was also involved in politics, which landed him on the master list of Nixon political opponents. Ironically, his first cousin, once removed, Edward Ridley Finch Cox, married Nixon's daughter.

== Background ==
Finch married Angela Havens of Hewlett, New York in 1943. Their son Charles B. Finch, Jr., born in 1954, made a brief run for the United States Congress in 1984 and also ran for New York's 15th congressional district on the East Side of Manhattan in 1986. Their second son, William Finch, was born in 1956. He is the grandfather of author Charles Finch.
