= Charlie Finch =

American art critic (1953–2022)

- Born: Charles Baker Finch Jr. April 22, 1953; New York City, U.S.
- Died: August 24, 2022 (aged 69); New York City, U.S.
- Education: Yale University (BA)
- Occupation: Art critic
- Spouses: Mary Truitt (div. 1981); Marion Callis (divorced)
- Children: Charles
- Writing career
- Period: 1992–2012

Charles Baker Finch Jr. (April 22, 1953 – August 24, 2022) was an American art critic who wrote for Artnet and Coagula.

== Early life ==
Finch was born in Manhattan on April 22, 1953. His father was a business executive and his mother was a buyer and homemaker. He attended Phillips Academy, received a bachelor's degree in political science from Yale University in 1974, and enrolled at Union Theological Seminary, but did not graduate.

== Career ==
In the 1980s, Finch hosted a radio program called Artbreaking on WBAI and was a one-time culture columnist for the Paris Review online. He also operated a short lived art gallery in the East Village which he named Real Art.

In 1992, Finch began writing for Coagula Art Journal, and he became known for his often vitriolic and controversial reviews. He then wrote for Artnet from 1996 to 2012. While his defenders praised him as passionate, his writing was also criticized as overly gossipy or cruel.

== Personal life and death ==
Finch was married twice, first to Mary Truitt, the daughter of sculptor Anne Truitt, and then to Marion Callis; both marriages ended in divorce, with his first marriage dissolving in 1981. With Truitt, he had a son, novelist Charles Finch.

On August 24, 2022, Finch, according to his son, either jumped or fell to his death from the window of his East Village apartment in Manhattan. He had been ill with cancer for about a decade, and a neighbor speculated that he may have been also distressed about his finances, as he lived in his apartment under rent control, and the building had recently been sold.
