= Latah/Hangman, Spokane =

Latah/Hangman
- Spokane Neighborhood
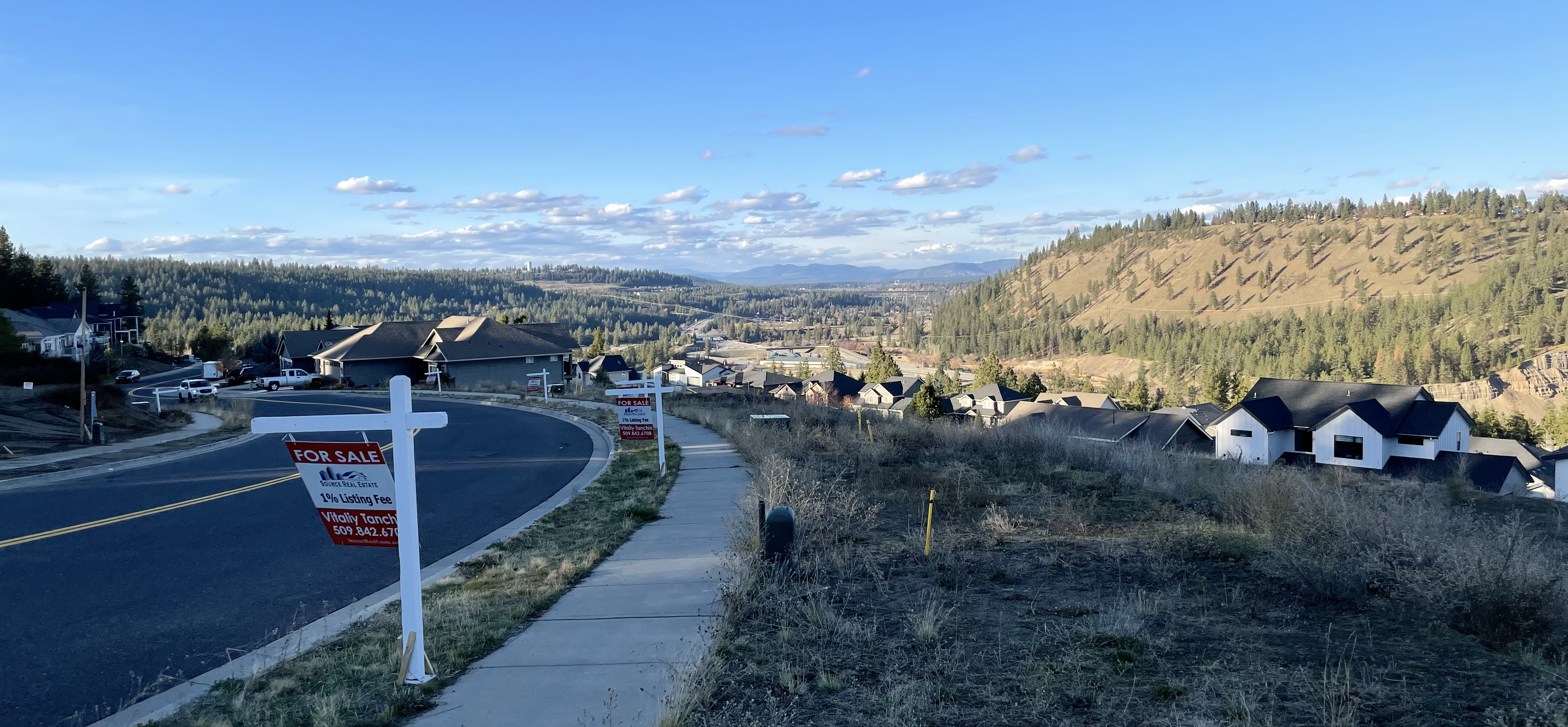
- Latah Valley from Eagle Ridge

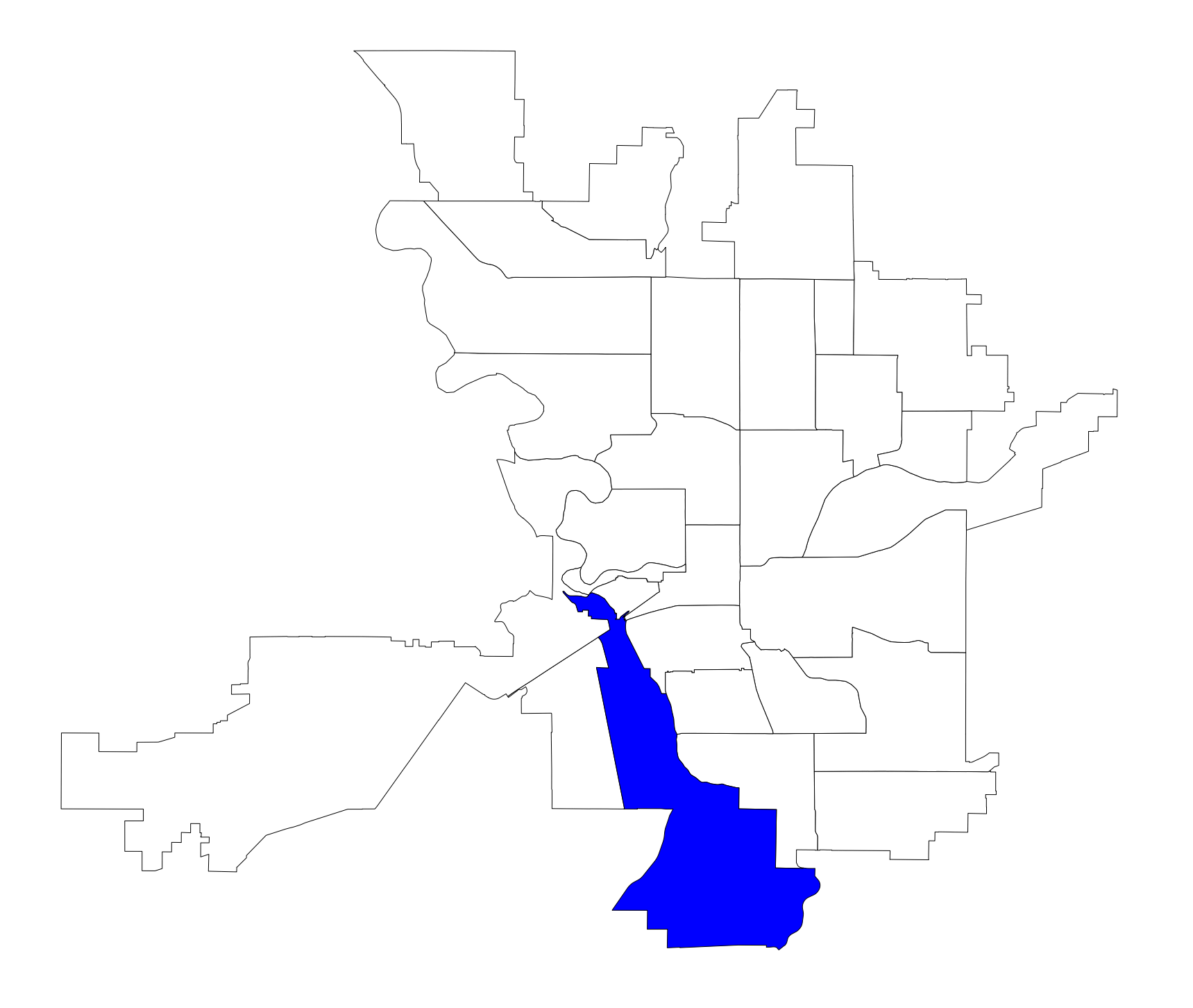
- Location within the city of Spokane
- Coordinates: 47°37′10.0″N 117°25′58.3″W
- Country: United States
- State: Washington
- County: Spokane
- City: Spokane

Population (2017)
  - Total: 4,938

Demographics 2017
  - White: 92.2%
  - Latinx: 4%
  - Asian/Native Hawaiian/Pacific Islander: 2.1%
  - Black: 1.1%
  - American Indian/Alaska Native: 0.9%
- Time zone: UTC-8 (PST)
  - Summer (DST): UTC-7 (PDT)
- ZIP Codes: 99203, 99223, 99224
- Area code: 509

Latah/Hangman is a neighborhood in Spokane, Washington.

It is named for Latah Creek, also known locally as Hangman Creek, which flows through the neighborhood and cuts the valley in which it is located. Latah/Hangman is located in the valley of the creek, which isolates it somewhat from the rest of the city. It is also a very long neighborhood, stretching from the Spokane River Gorge, about a mile downstream from the city center, on the north all the way to the city's southernmost point.

Topography, dominated by the deep valley cut by the creek, along which runs U.S. Route 195, is a defining feature of the neighborhood. The creek and highway divide Latah/Hangman into numerous distinct districts including Vinegar Flats, Qualchan and Eagle Ridge. The neighborhood is known for its mixture of developed, residential areas that exist alongside undeveloped or rural areas which gives the neighborhood a more small town feel even in its northernmost limits which are just a mile from the central business district of Downtown Spokane.

== Geography ==
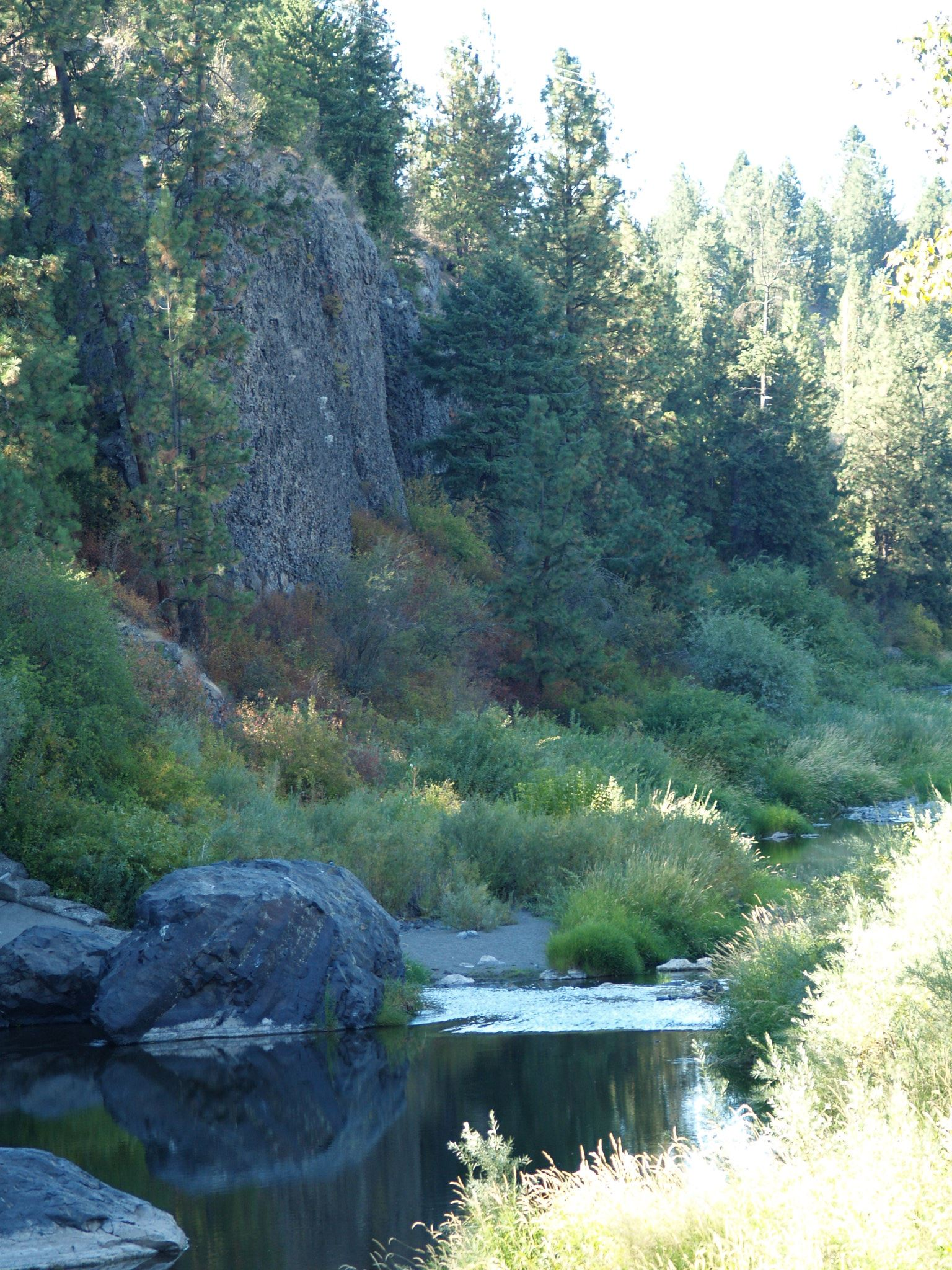
Rocky cliffs cut by Latah Creek rise from the northern part of Vinegar Flats

=== Districts ===
==== Vinegar Flats ====
Located in the northern portion of the neighborhood, Vinegar Flats, as the name suggests, is located on flat land along the banks of Latah Creek. Vinegar Flats is the older portion of Latah/Hangman in terms of development, as it is the closest to the city center. This area is laid out along the city's street grid, which is regularly interrupted by the creek, bluffs and cliffs. Latah Creek lies to the east of the district in the south before cutting through the center and flowing along the west side as it heads north. There are bridges at Inland Empire Way, Chestnut Street and 13th Avenue. Vinegar Flats is long and thin, stretching from 9th Avenue in the north to roughly 30th Avenue in the south. At no point is the developed area of Vinegar Flats more than five city blocks wide, with no more than three north–south streets running parallel to each other anywhere in the district. U.S. 195 runs along the western edge of the district, and connects to Vinegar Flats via Thorpe Road. That, along with Inland Empire Way, are the only automobile routes into or out of Vinegar Flats. 13th Avenue connects with the rest of the city through High Bridge Park, but there is a gate across the road at the park entrance which can be locked at night.

Vinegar Flats has a mixed character with older craftsman-style homes, mobile homes, open fields, large commercial greenhouses and a few businesses all interspersed with one another.

Wentel Grant Park, a small neighborhood park, is located to the south (west bank) of Latah Creek at Inland Empire Way and has a playground, basketball hoop, softball diamond, picnic shelter and grass fields. To the north of Vinegar Flats, below and beyond the high bridges, is the aptly named High Bridge Park which is much larger than Wentel Grant Park.

The name Vinegar Flats comes from the Keller-Lorenz Vinegar Works, which was located in the district from 1890 through the mid 20th century.

==== Qualchan ====
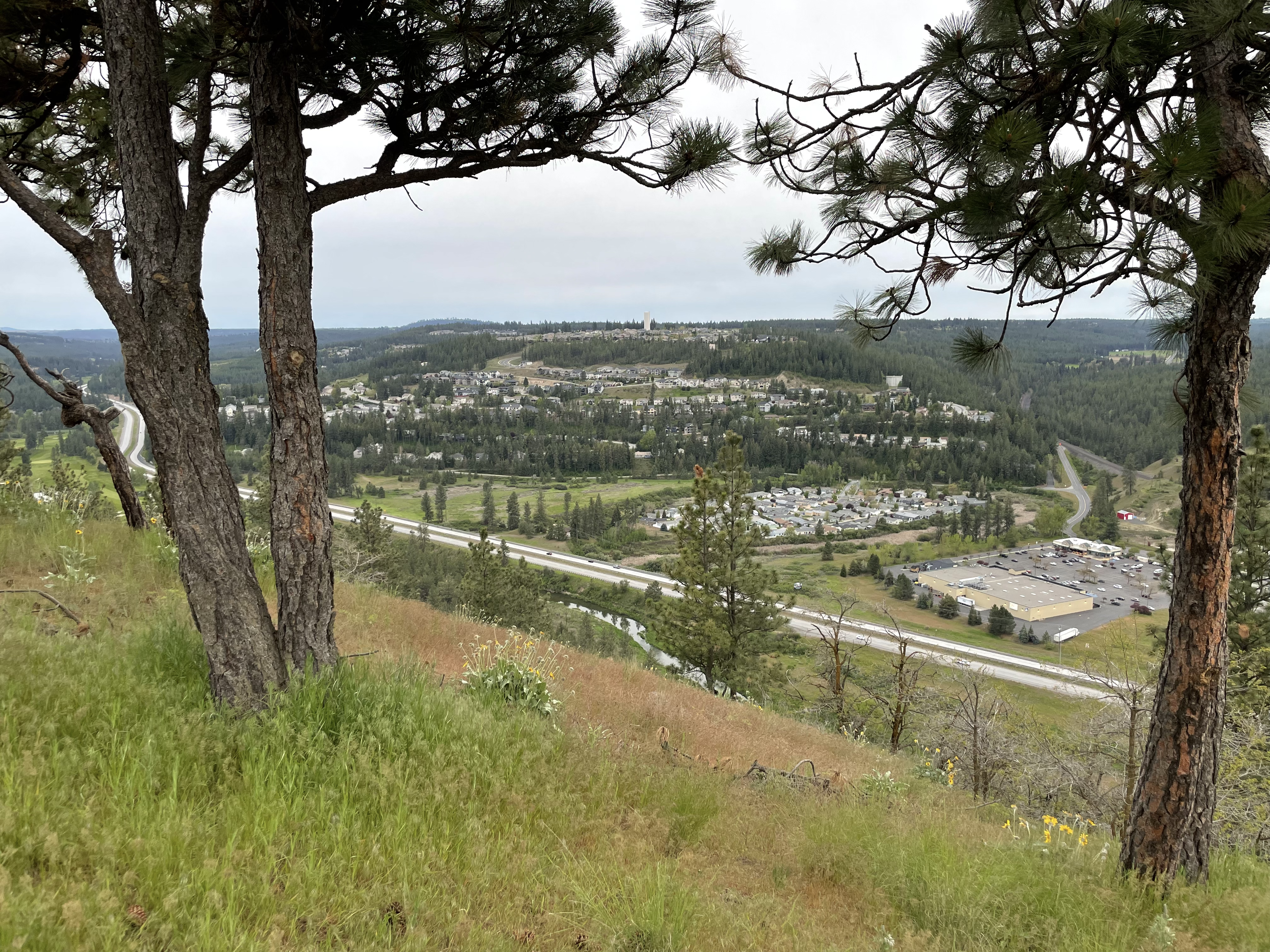
Qualchan (lower) and Eagle Ridge (upper) from across Latah Valley at the South Hill.

Located south of Vinegar Flats and north of Eagle Ridge, Qualchan sits roughly in the middle of the neighborhood. It is bisected by U.S. Route 195, and the character of the district are distinct on each side of the highway. To the north and east is The Creek at Qualchan golf course, a municipal course operated by the city of Spokane. Latah Creek meanders through the golf course, and steep bluffs rise abruptly to the north and east. The bulk of the development in Qualchan is to the south and west of the highway. A commercial district, which is home to the only services in all of Latah/Hangman including grocery, gas and restaurants, is located here along Cheney-Spokane Road. Above that, climbing the hill towards Eagle Ridge, is the Qualchan housing development.

Development in the Qualchan area is more recent than Vinegar Flats, but slightly older than in Eagle Ridge. The Qualchan area was annexed by the city in 1981, at which point it was rapidly developed. It is more suburban in nature than Vinegar Flats, and does not conform to the city's street grid. It is connected to the rest of the city by U.S. 195, which has an overpass interchange at Cheney-Spokane Road, and an at-grade connection to Qualchan Drive. Lincoln Way and Cedar Road connect Qualchan with Eagle Ridge.

The name comes from 19th century Yakama chieftain Qualchan, who was hung by George Wright during the Yakama War a few miles upstream, from which Latah Creek's moniker of Hangman Creek is also derived.

==== Eagle Ridge ====
The most recently developed portion of Latah/Hangman, Eagle Ridge is a suburban development on the slopes and high ground above the western side of the Latah Valley. It is located in the southernmost portion of the neighborhood, and thus the city as well. Development began in Eagle Ridge in the mid-1990s. In 2002, Spokane County approved denser housing in the area, and subsequent development has retained the suburban nature but has been less spread out as the original development in places.

Eagle Ridge is entirely single-family residential, with no retail or commercial districts and no public parks, though there are two private parks for residents. It is a planned community of roughly 1,200 homes, all of which are part of a homeowner association.

As a planned community, and due to the topographical concerns, Eagle Ridge, like Qualchan below, does not follow the city's street grid. It is connected to the rest of the city via U.S. 195, which has an at-grade intersection at Meadowlane Road. Lincoln Way and Cedar Road, via Cheney-Spokane Road, connect Eagle Ridge with Qualchan and points beyond.

Despite being within the city limits of Spokane, portions of Eagle Ridge near the municipal boundary are part of the Cheney School District rather than Spokane Public Schools.

=== Physical Geography ===
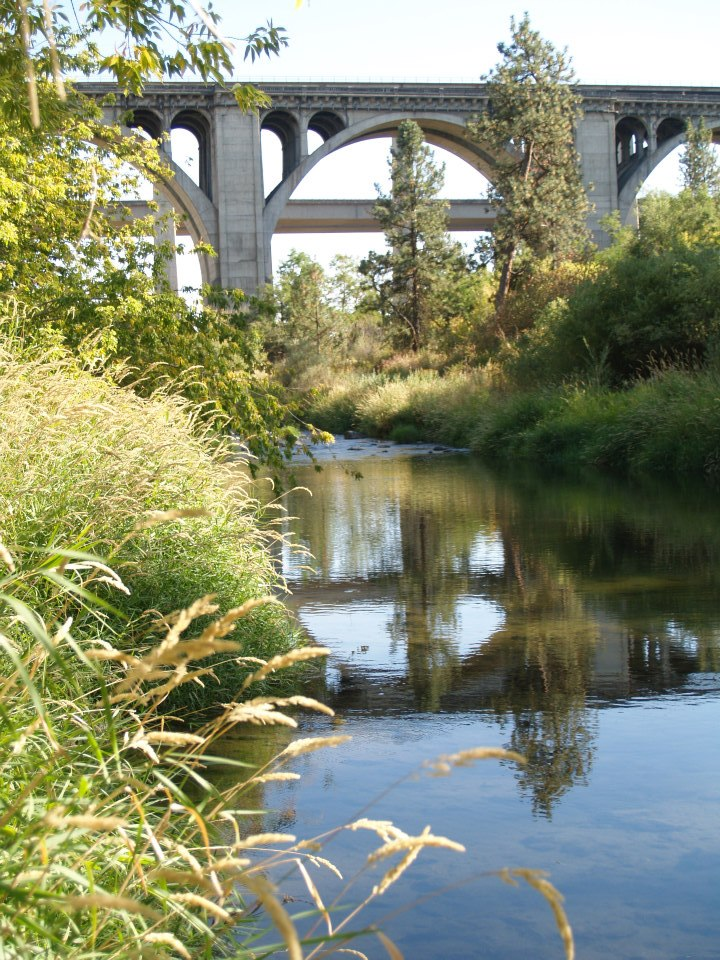
The "high bridges" crossing Latah Creek from High Bridge Park looking south

Latah/Hangman has a diverse geography thanks to its large size relative to other neighborhoods in the city. From High Bridge Park in the far north the neighborhood stretches more than four miles south-southeast to the city's southern limit. Its boundaries are irregular, but the vast majority of the neighborhood is located on the floor of the valley cut by Latah Creek or the slopes along either side. The floor of the valley, along the creek, lies at elevations between 1,700 feet in the north and 1,800 feet in the south. The surrounding Columbia Plateau lies at an elevation in excess of 2,300 feet, giving the Latah Valley a depth of up to 500 feet. In places, particularly on the eastern slopes, that rise is dramatic and occurs across less than a quarter-mile of distance.

The slopes to the east are the steepest, and largely unsuitable for development except for at southernmost tip of Latah/Hangman along Hatch Road. Other than the development there, the eastern slopes are dominated by parkland covering over 500 acres commonly known as the South Hill Bluff. Trails crisscross the bluff, making switchbacks and passing through ponderosa pine forest and bunchgrass meadows. The slopes to the west are less dramatic and more suitable for development. It is on those slopes that the Qulachan and Eagle Ridge developments are located. The western slopes are also interrupted by valleys of smaller streams like Garden Springs Creek and Marshall Creek draining into Latah Creek.

The valley serves as a major transportation corridor for the region, carrying a limited access highway, U.S. 195, and two railroads into Spokane. The more westerly of the two railroad tracks is part of the BNSF Railway's Northern Transcon route. Towards the northern edge of the neighborhood, Interstate 90 and U.S. 195 cross over the creek together, along with separate bridges carrying Sunset Highway, a surface street, and the BNSF tracks. These bridges are the namesake for High Bridge Park, which lies in their shadow.

Latah/Hangman straddles the boundary between two ecoregions as defined by the World Wildlife Fund. Most portions of the neighborhood, like almost all of the rest of the city, lie within the Okanagan dry forests ecoregion, which stretches from just south of Spokane northwest through the Okanagan and into the Thompson Plateau of British Columbia. Tall ponderosa pine trees are a remnant of the pre-development nature of the ecoregion. In the far south of the neighborhood, beyond the crest of Eagle Ridge to the south the Okanagan dry forests transition into the Palouse grasslands.

=== Boundaries ===
Riverside Avenue is the neighborhood's northern border. On the west the border is defined by the limits of High Bridge Park in the north, then by U.S. 195 south to 16th Avenue, then the BNSF tracks to 44th Avenue. At 44th the boundary cuts back to the east to Cheney-Spokane Road, which it follows southwest to the city limits. From there the southern border is a series of zig-zags to the southeast, then to the east along what would be 73rd Avenue, until reaching the Hatch Road bridge over Latah Creek. The border then follows Hatch Road north to 57th Avenue, where it then zig-zags to the northwest until reaching what would be 40th Avenue. From here the border follows High Drive along the crest of the bluff until 21st Avenue, then the rail tracks at the bottom of the bluff to 7th Avenue where it reenters High Bridge Park.

== Demographics ==
As of 2017, Latah/Hangman was home to 4,938 people across 2,068 households. 27.8% of households had children. 16% of households were rented, compared to 45.3% citywide. The median household income was $66,535 compared to $44,768 citywide. 44.6% of residents had a bachelor's degree or higher while 17% had only a high school diploma, compared to 29.5% and 24.6% citywide respectively. The unemployment rate was 4.5%, compared to 6.5% for the city. Persons of color made up 11.6% of the population, compared to 15.1% citywide. 91.8% of residents were born in the United States or its territories. Of residents not born in the U.S. or territories, 15.9% came from Ukraine, 11.9% from Russia, 10.2% from the United Kingdom and 9% from Mexico.

== Education ==
Most of Latah/Hangman is served by Spokane Public Schools, though the western and southern areas of Qualchan and Eagle Ridge are in the Cheney School District. There are no schools within the neighborhood.

Vinegar Flats is part of the Wilson Elementary district, located in the adjacent Comstock neighborhood. The rest of Latah/Hangman within the Spokane School District are in the Mullan Road Elementary district, located in unincorporated Spokane County about a mile south of the Southgate neighborhood. Both Wilson and Mullan Road feed into Sacajawea Middle School in Comstock, though starting in 2023 Mullan Road will begin to feed into the new Peperzak Middle School being constructed adjacent to Mullan Road Elementary. The Wilson and Mullan Road districts both currently, and will after 2023, feed into Lewis and Clark High School.

The areas of Qualchan and Eagle Ridge that are part of the Cheney School District feed into Windsor Elementary and Westwood Middle School in Geiger Heights. Like the rest of the Cheney School District, they then feed into Cheney High School in Cheney.

== Transportation ==
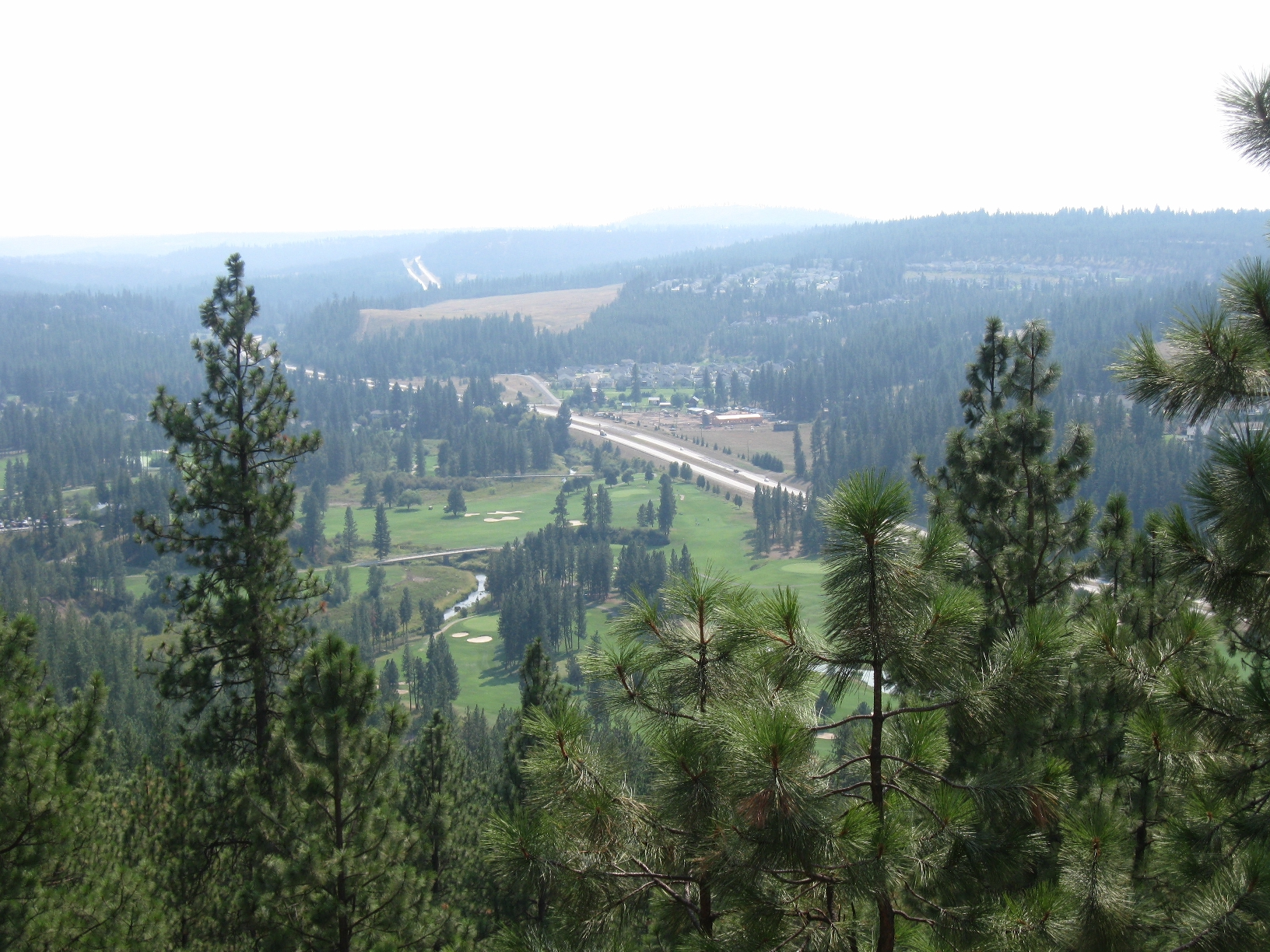
U.S. 195 and the Creek at Qualchan Golf Course from High Drive Bluff Park

=== Interstate ===
- - Interstate 90 - to Spokane (east) and Seattle (west)

Interstate 90 connects to Latah/Hangman via U.S. 195 at the latter's northern terminus in the far northern part of the neighborhood.

=== Highway ===
- - U.S. 195 - to Spokane (north) and Pullman (south)

U.S. 195 passes north–south through Latah/Hangman with interchanges at I-90 in the north, 16th Avenue, Thorpe Road, Cheney-Spokane Road, Qualchan Drive, Meadow Lane Road and Hatch Road in the south.

=== City Streets ===
Inland Empire Way connects Latah/Hangman to the rest of the city through the Vinegar Flats district. Inland Empire Way climbs out of the Latah Valley northbound to Seventh Avenue, where it connects to Cliff/Cannon. After Seventh it passes under the high bridges and bends into a merge with Sunset Boulevard eastbound, through which it connects to Browne's Addition and into Downtown. The Thorpe Road exit off U.S. 195 connects to Inland Empire Way via 23rd Avenue.

Hatch Road connects the southernmost portion of the neighborhood to the rest of Spokane through the South Hill. Hatch Road defines the city limits here as it climbs from Latah Creek up to 57th Avenue. There are over four miles between Seventh Avenue and Hatch Road, the only roads up the bluff in this area.

There are no streets classified by the city as principal arterials in Latah/Hangman, though Inland Empire Way, Cheney-Spokane Road and Hatch Road are considered minor arterials. In Vinegar Flats, 23rd Avenue/Thorpe Road between Inland Empire Way and U.S. 195 are considered collector roads, as is Inland Empire Way south of there. Collector roads in Qualchan are Qualchan Drive and Lincoln Boulevard. Cedar Road, Eagle Ridge Boulevard and Lincoln Way are considered collectors in Eagle Ridge. Sunset Boulevard is a principal arterial as it passes over the northern edge of the neighborhood, though it does not connect with the neighborhood directly.

=== Other ===
The Fish Lake Trail has its northern terminus on the border of Latah/Hangman and then passes through the western edge of the neighborhood on its path south. It connects to the north with the Spokane River Centennial Trail, which connects the neighborhood to the rest of the Spokane Metropolitan Area, and on the south with the Columbia Plateau Trail.
