= Marshall Creek (Latah Creek) =

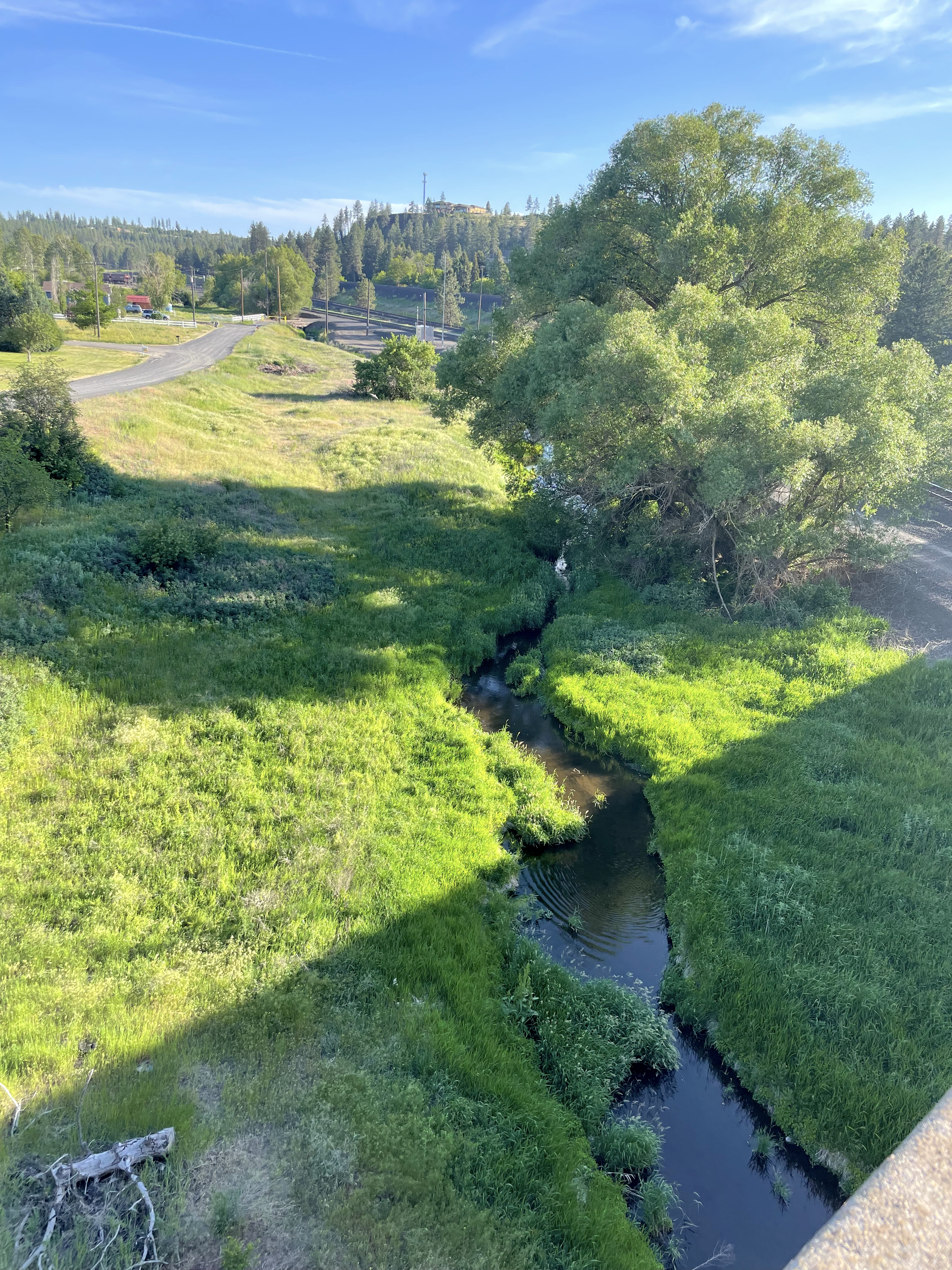
- Marshall Creek at the community of Marshall

- Location of the mouth of Marshall Creek in Washington Marshall Creek (Latah Creek) (the United States)

Location
- Country: United States
- State: Washington
- County: Spokane
- City: Marshall, Spokane

Physical characteristics
- Source
  - location: Southeast of Cheney
  - coordinates: 47°28′29.2″N 117°29′56.6″W
  - elevation: 2,300 ft (700 m)
- Mouth: Latah Creek
  - location: Latah/Hangman, Spokane, Washington
  - coordinates: 47°36′51.7″N 117°25′27.5″W
  - elevation: 1,800 ft (550 m)
- Length: 10 mi (16 km)

Basin features
- Progression: Latah Creek → Spokane River → Columbia River → Pacific Ocean
- River system: Columbia River
- Tributaries
  - left: Minnie Creek

Marshall Creek is a stream flowing over 10 miles through Spokane County, Washington from east of the city of Cheney northwest through the channeled scablands and the community of Marshall before ultimately joining Latah Creek in the Latah/Hangman neighborhood of Spokane.

Marshall Creek, along with its main tributary Minnie Creek, drains a sizable area southwest of Spokane from the communities of Four Lakes in the northwest and Geiger Heights in the north to Turnbull National Wildlife Refuge in the south.

== Geography ==
Marshall Creek drains a sizable area of Spokane County southwest of and including a small portion of the city of Spokane, where it empties into Latah Creek in the Latah/Hangman neighborhood of the city. The source of the main stem begins just northeast of Turnbull National Wildlife Refuge and flows through the channeled scablands and coulee landscape typical of this portion of the Columbia Plateau before flowing into Latah Creek at roughly the intersection of Cheney-Spokane Road and U.S. Route 395 in the Latah Valley area of Spokane.

The main stem of the creek begins in the channeled scablands just northeast of Turnbull National Wildlife Refuge in rural southeastern Spokane County, approximately three miles southeasteast of Cheney, at an elevation of roughly 2,300 feet above sea level. The stream flows in a northeasterly direction from there into the city of Spokane where it enters Latah Creek at approximately 1,800 feet above sea level.

After heading roughly northeasterly from its source in the scablands, Marshall Creek enters the community of Marshall approximately 5 river-miles from its mouth at Latah Creek. The stream passes along the western side of the community of Marshall, flanked by railroads, and passes under the National Register of Historic Places-listed Marshall Bridge.

Marshall Creek's main tributary, Minnie Creek, enters from the west as a left-bank tributary immediately upstream (south) of the community of Marshall. The valleys cut by Marshall and Minnie Creeks are used by both roads, such as Cheney–Spokane Road, connecting the two largest cities in the drainage basin, as well as multiple railroads. The valleys through which these two creeks traverse are important transportation corridors in the region.

=== Minnie Creek ===
Minnie Creek begins on the northern slopes of Needham Hill just south of Interstate 90 on the fringes of the suburbs southwest of Spokane. It flows west and then south from there along I-90 into the community of Four Lakes where it turns to a southeast orientation and flows alongside Washington State Route 904 into Cheney, around the western slopes of Needham Hill.

Minnie Creek skirts the eastern edge of the city of Cheney before turning to the northeast and following Cheney-Spokane Road around the southern slopes of Prosser Hill. At Cheney, Minnie Creek begins to take in waters flowing northeast out of Turnbull National Wildlife Refuge, which make up much of the southern and western portions of the Marshall Creek drainage basin.

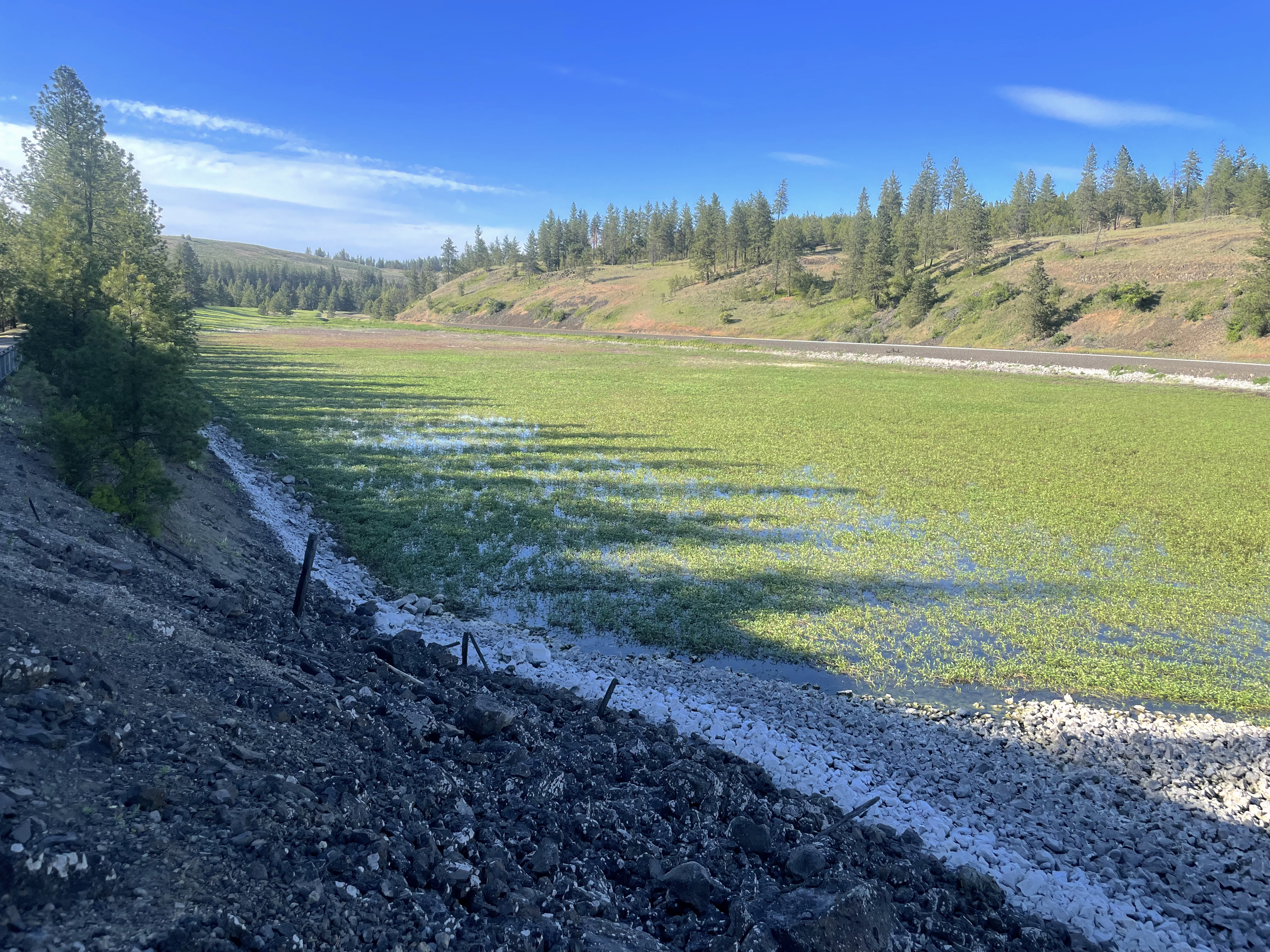
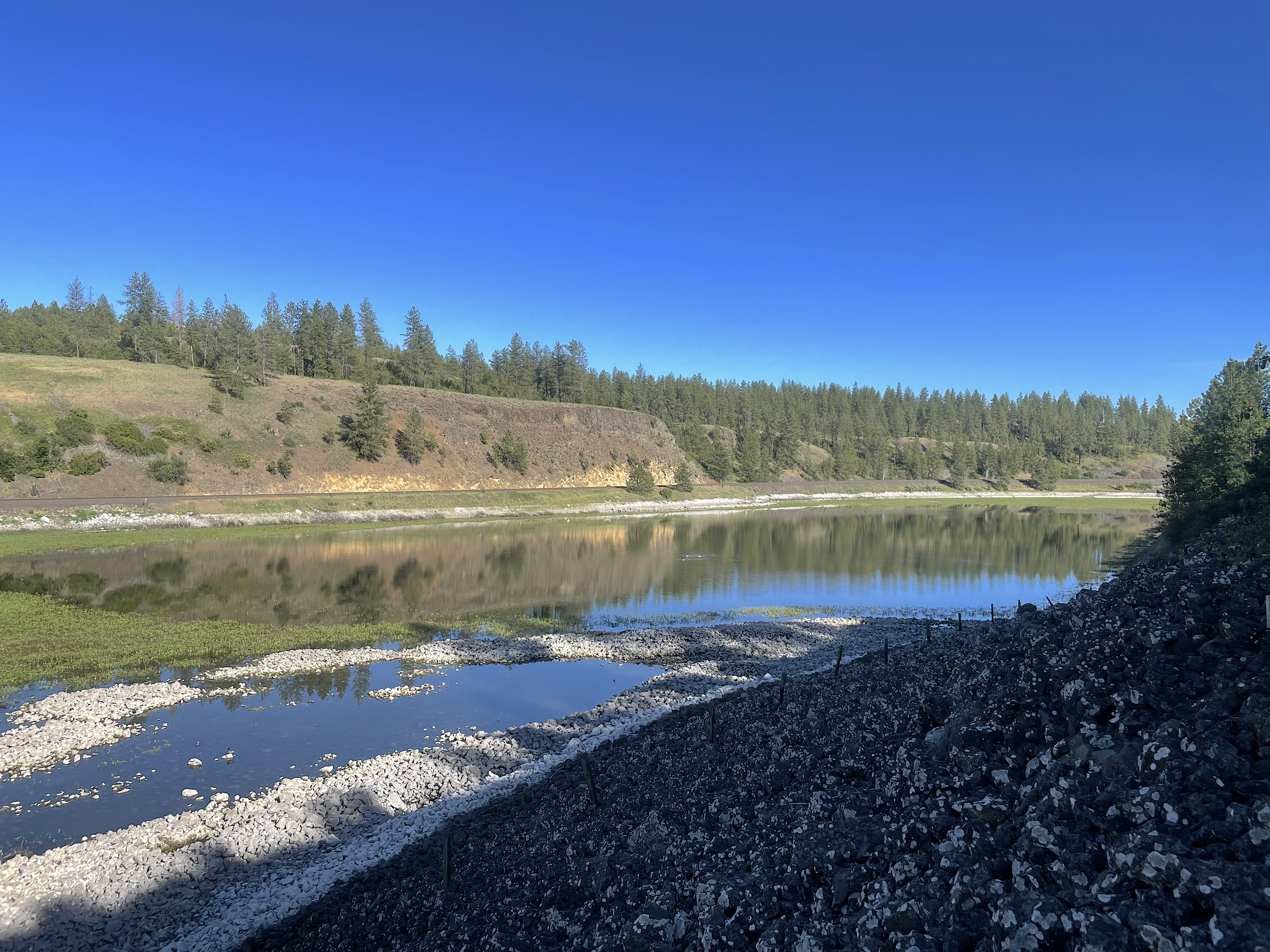
Queen Lucas Lake looking downstream (left) and upstream from the same spot on the Fish Lake Trail in June 2024

The stream progresses northeasterly and takes in water from Fish Lake before flowing into and out of Queen Lucas Lake, about a mile upstream from its confluence with Marshall Creek. Cheney-Spokane Road, which is the main non-highway thoroughfare between the cities of Cheney and Spokane, follows the valley of Minnie Creek to its confluence with Marshall Creek and from there along Marshall Creek into Spokane.

== History ==
Marshall Creek and the community of Marshall was named for William Marshall, an early pioneer homesteader who arrived in the area in 1878. Prior to his arrival, Marshall worked in the California lumber industry. With that background, he built a dam on the creek to establish a sawmill. The dam was completed in early 1880. The first railroad through the valley of the creek was completed in 1881. Sometime around or shortly after 1902 a convict camp along the creek just south of the community of Marshall began to take water from the creek to break rock into road building material. Commercial use of the waters of Marshall Creek continued into the second decade of the 20th century when the Spokane Greenhouses were constructed over the creek in 1918 and used its waters for coal-fired steam heating of the greenhouses.

After 1930, accounts tell that the creek was moved and straightened. Further human use of both Marshall and Minnie Creeks continued from there, including diversion of water and irrigation. Between the 1950s and 1990 there were accounts of the creek running dry. Starting in the 1990s, conservation and restoration efforts began.

The Marshall Community Coalition was active from the 1990s through the 2010s, working on issues such as stream flow, water quality and habitat restoration. The U.S. Fish and Wildlife Department also undertook similar projects during those decades. The latter planted thousands of trees and bushes along the riparian areas and reintroduced native grasses. Meadows along the creek had previously been used to grow hay.

=== Formation of Marshall Lake ===
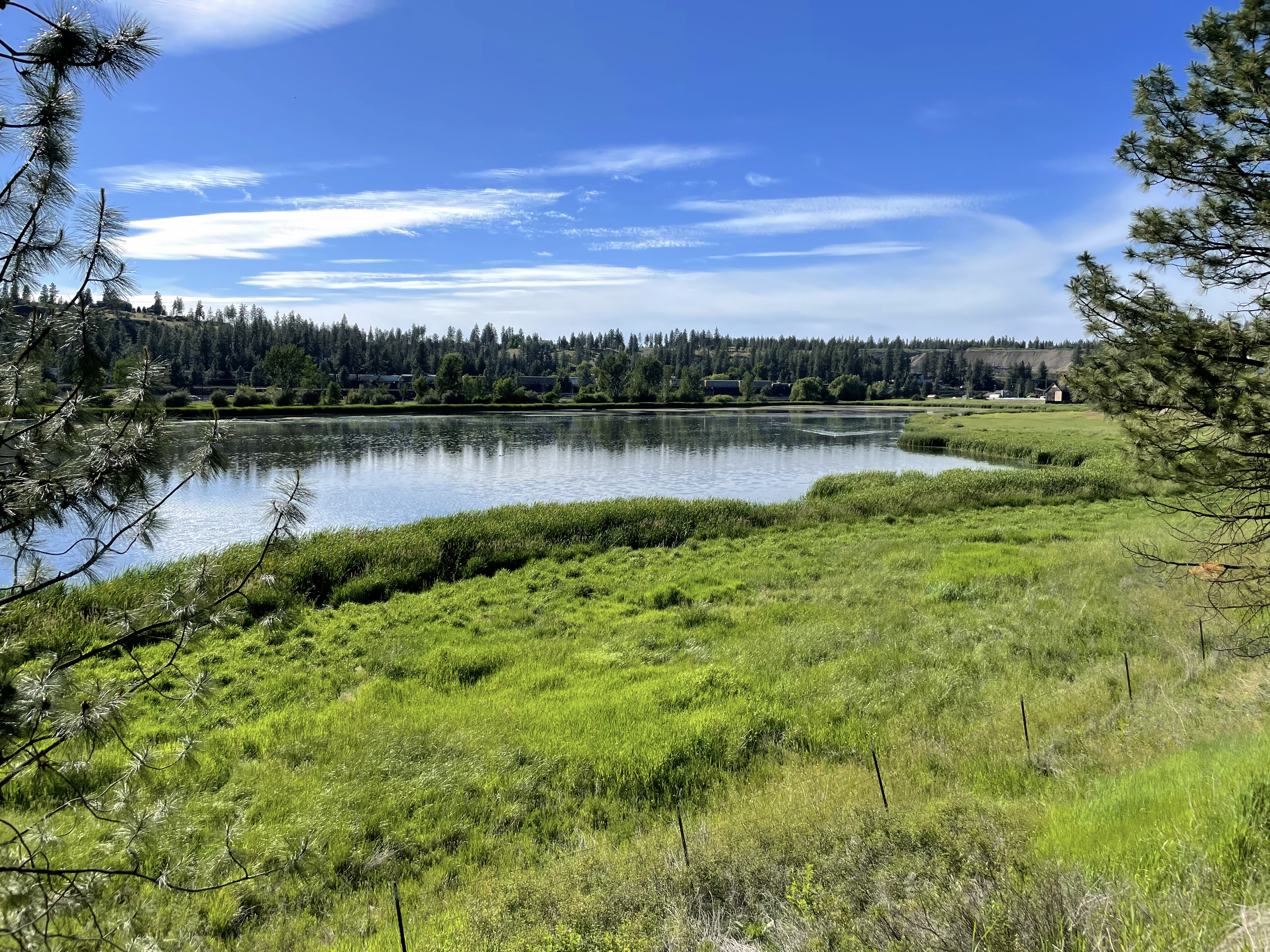
Marshall Lake in June 2024

A large field located just south of the community of Marshall, in the valley of Marshall Creek where Minnie Creek joins from the west, was owned by a property owner named Horton. In 2016 and 2017, flooding issues impacted the property, leading local landowners to dig a drainage ditch. After the property went into foreclosure, the ditch was no longer maintained. That lack of upkeep, combined with a railroad trestle replacement upstream allowed water to freely enter the field and accumulate.

Satellite imagery shows accumulation of water at what would become known as Marshall Lake in June of 2017. The field has been flooded since. Flow rate measurements in September 2023 showed a flow of approximately 2.75 cubic feet per second upstream of Marshall Lake. Just below the diversion into the lake, the stream's flow was recorded at 0.75 cubic feet per second. By three miles downstream from the lake the flow rate was zero, suggesting that the stream had run completely dry above its former mouth at Latah Creek. September is the dry season in the area, but former Spokane Riverkeeper Jerry White reported that the stream was unable to reach Latah Creek as early as May of 2023. In October 2023, the Spokane Conservation District hosted a public meeting to discuss the issues with flow in Marshall Creek and discuss potential remediation plans for the stream going forward.
