= Cheney High School (Washington) =

Location
- 460 North 6th Street; Cheney, Washington 99004; United States; 47.498°N 117.577°W

Information
- Motto: Connected, Honorable, & Safe - It's the Blackhawk Way!
- School district: Cheney School District
- NCES School ID: 530123000223
- Principal: Caroline White
- Teaching staff: 78.75 (FTE)
- Grades: 9–12
- Enrollment: 1,491 (2024-2025)
- Student to teacher ratio: 18.93
- Colors: Red and Black
- Mascot: Blackhawk
- Yearbook: Titocom
- Website: chs.cheneysd.org

Cheney High School is a four-year public high school in Cheney, Washington, United States serving the Cheney School District. The school has a population of 1,300 students in grades 9–12, with more than 70 full-time equivalent teaching staff. Cheney athletic teams compete in the Greater Spokane League (3A class) as the Blackhawks, and the school colors are red and black.

== Building ==
In 1929, voters approved the construction of a new high school, after school district consolidation was anticipated to exceed the capacity of the existing building, which was completed in 1913. Plans were drawn up to move the junior high into the 1913 building, demolish an older building (1893) and reuse its bricks for the construction of a new school. The first event at the new building was a basketball game against Davenport High School, held on January 7, 1930; students and teachers moved in two weeks later, on January 22.

In 1966, a new open-campus high school was built at the present location on North 6th Street; junior high classes were moved to the 1930 high school, which was renamed Fisher Junior High. When the new junior high school building was completed in 1977, the 1930 high school building was taken over and reused as administrative offices by the school district until 2012, when offices were moved to the former Nike missile base designated F-37 on Andrus Road near Four Lakes.

The high school was remodeled in 1970 and 1993 to enclose the campus and add a second story, totaling 177,013 ft^{2} (16,445.0 m^{2}) of floor area; a new addition was completed in 2020 to add 17 classrooms, a student commons, auditorium, and athletic facilities, with a total combined area of 232,000 ft^{2} (21,600 m^{2}). The total cost of the expansion was estimated at $28.53 million in 2017.

== Activities ==
Cheney High School competes in the Greater Spokane League (GSL), moving up to the WIAA 3A classification for the 2020–21 school year. Previously, Cheney had competed in the Great Northern League (GNL), which was reorganized from the Frontier League in 1998, in the 2A/AA class. In 2002, Cheney entered the GSL as a 3A class school, but was reclassed to 2A in 2004 and returned to the GNL.

=== State championships ===
- Boys cross country: 1989
- Girls cross country: 2012
- Boys golf: 1989
- Boys golf: 2026
- Boys soccer: 2013
- Boys tennis: 1981
- Boys track and field: 2018
- Boys wrestling: 1989
- Volleyball: 1987

== Notable alumni ==
- Michael P. Anderson (1977), astronaut
- Launi Meili (1981), Olympic gold medalist
- Steve Emtman (1988), professional football player
- Rick DeMulling (1996), professional football player
- Kelsey Cook (2007), stand-up comedian
- Gladius Edejer (2007), international soccer player for the Marshall Islands

== Reports of sexual abuse ==
Michael Alstad, the music director of Cheney High School from 1982-1986, was accused of abusing a student for two years during the time he worked at the school. The former student said that Cheney School District knew that he was abusing students but had not done anything to stop him; after he resigned from Cheney in 1986, he was hired by the Aberdeen School District, and he later admitted in a 2020 lawsuit to one claim of abuse there dating back to 1989. The former Cheney student won her lawsuit against the Cheney School District in 2024.
