= Tyler, Washington =

Unincorporated community in Washington, United States

- Unincorporated community
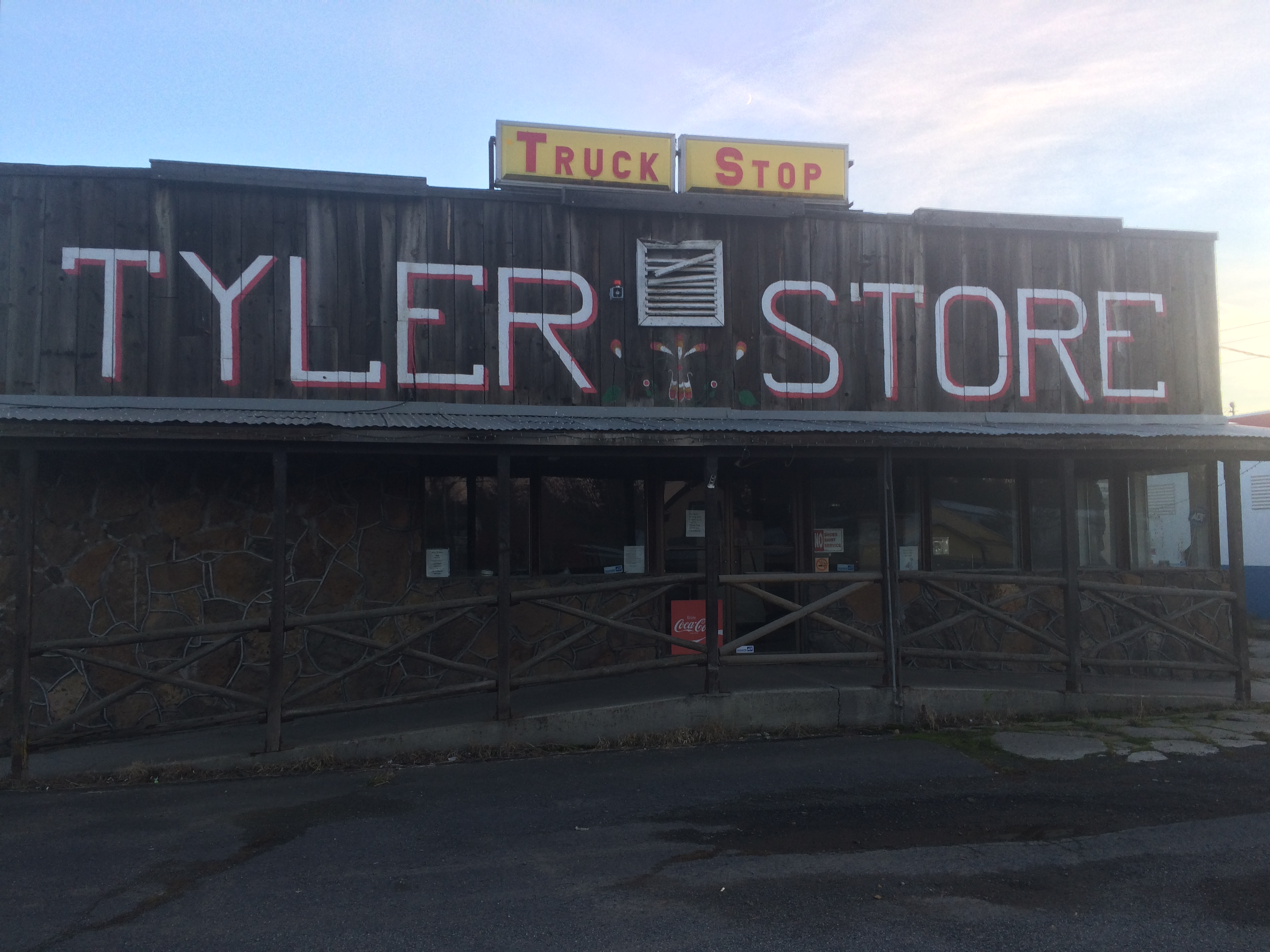
- Tyler Store

- Location within Washington (state)
- Coordinates: 47°26′10″N 117°47′01″W
- Country: United States
- State: Washington
- County: Spokane
- Tyler: 1882-1974
- Elevation: 2,293 ft (699 m)
- Time zone: UTC-8 (Pacific (PST))
  - Summer (DST): UTC-7 (PDT)
- Area code: 509
- GNIS feature ID: 1512746

Tyler is an unincorporated community in Spokane County, Washington, United States. Tyler is located on Washington State Route 904 near Interstate 90, 10.4 miles (16.7 km) west-southwest of Cheney.

== History ==
A post office called Tyler was established in 1882, and remained in operation until 1974. The community was given its name by the railroad.

The Northern Pacific Railway began laying tracks through the present location of Tyler in May 1881 along with a Railway Station under the town name of Tyler. In December 1881 Tyler's first store opened up, naming the new community Stevens.

On June 7, 1882, a Post Office opened up in Stevens. Along with other buildings as people started to settle in the Town of Stevens.

For the next 10 years, the town's name was Stevens, but in 1892 the Citizens Renamed the town "Tyler."

By the 1900s Tyler had many businesses and homes built. Tyler also had water and a stockyard in the middle of town. In 1965 the I-90 Freeway went right by the Community of Tyler. In 1974 Tyler's Post Office closed and to this day all mail is done through Cheney. Slowly the community began to decline in population.
