= Geiger Heights, Washington =

Unincorporated community in Washington, United States

- Unincorporated community
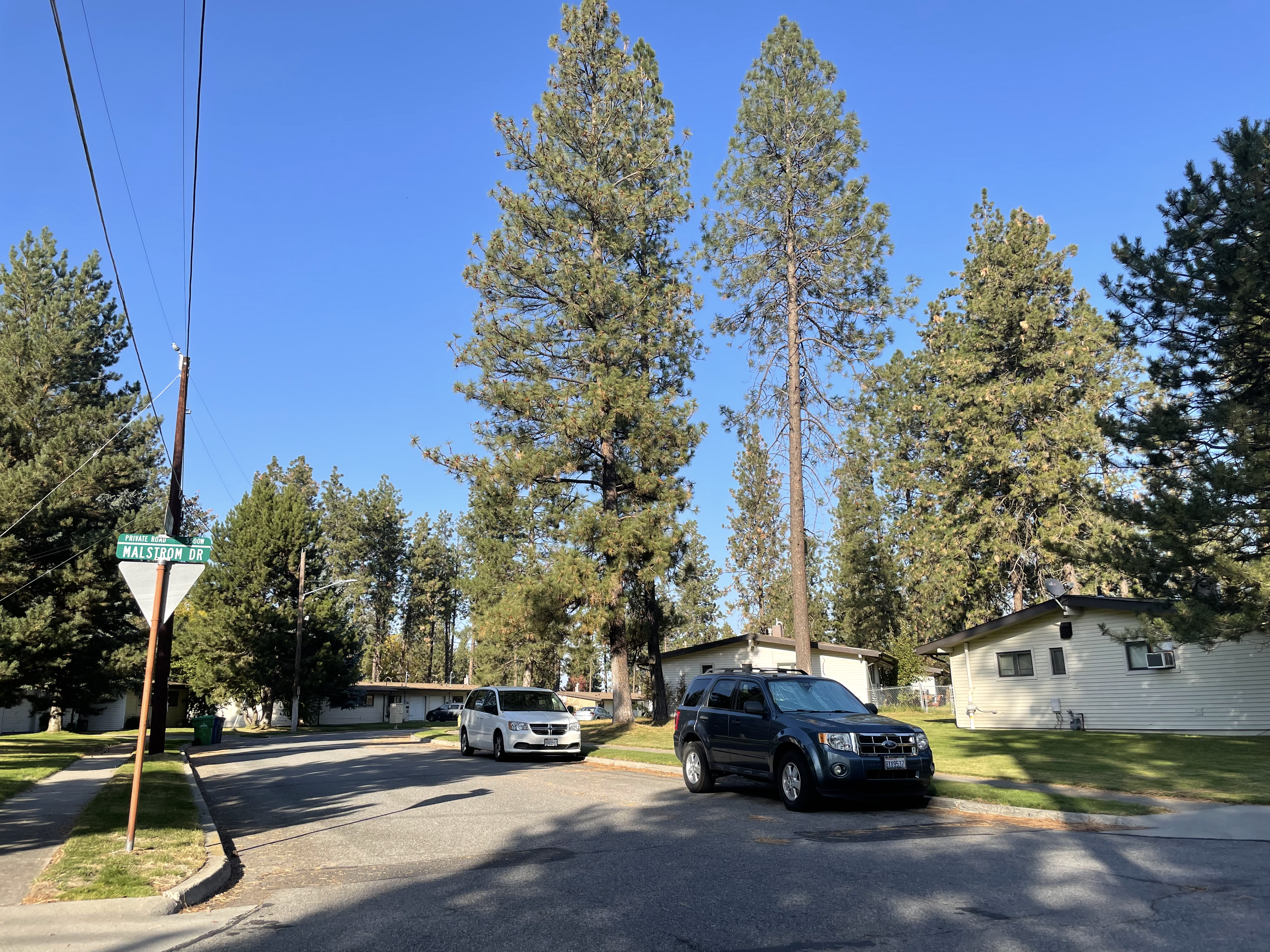

- Location within Washington (state)
- Coordinates: 47°35′34″N 117°29′27″W
- Country: United States
- State: Washington
- County: Spokane
- Elevation: 2,340 ft (710 m)
- Time zone: UTC-8 (Pacific (PST))
  - Summer (DST): UTC-7 (PDT)
- ZIP code: 99224
- Area code: 509
- GNIS feature ID: 1512235

Geiger Heights is an unincorporated community in Spokane County, Washington, United States. It takes its name from nearby Spokane International Airport, formerly named Geiger Field, located a few miles to the northwest.

== Geography ==
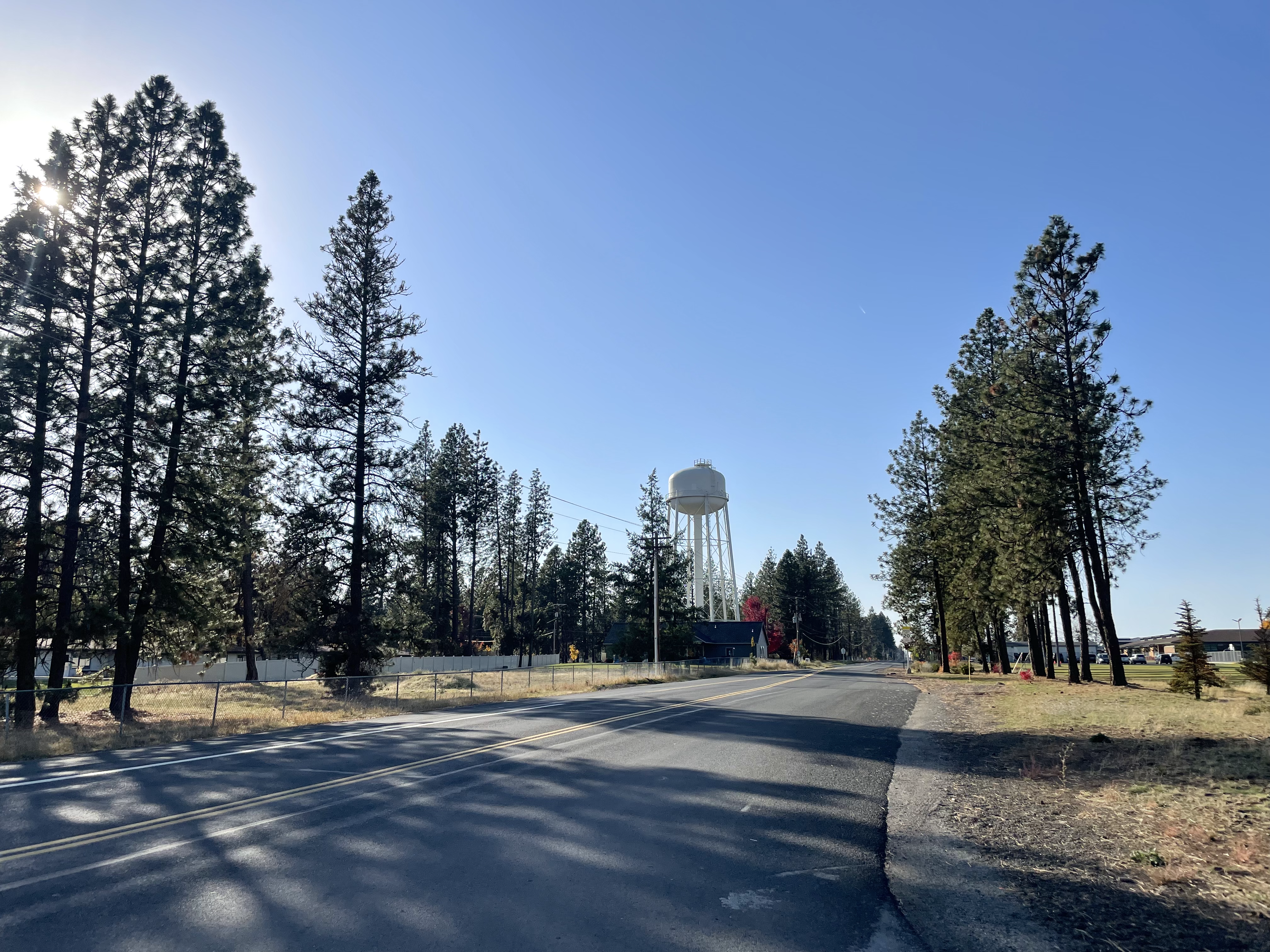
Geiger Heights from Hallett Road

Geiger Heights is located in the flat and rocky West Plains region on the west side of the greater Spokane area. The community itself is located approximately 7 miles by road southwest of downtown Spokane. It is surrounded by forests and farms interspersed with homes on large lots. Suburban sprawl from Spokane has extended to within a couple of miles to the north and west of the community with many new residential developments and industrial warehouses, especially along Interstate 90, built in the 2010s.

The community is located at the intersection of South Grove Road and West Hallett Road. Grove Road connects the community to Marshall, 2 miles to the south, and Interstate 90, 2 miles to the north. Hallett Road also connects to Interstate 90 4 miles to the west.

The bulk of Geiger Heights is a residential subdivision, but the community is also home to an elementary school and middle school located immediately to the north of the residential section across Hallett Road. The schools are part of the Cheney School District. The community is also served by Cheney High School in Cheney, 9 miles to the south-southwest.

There is a water tower and park in the residential subdivision, but the entirety of the subdivision area is privately owned. Tall ponderosa pines grow all over the community.

== History ==
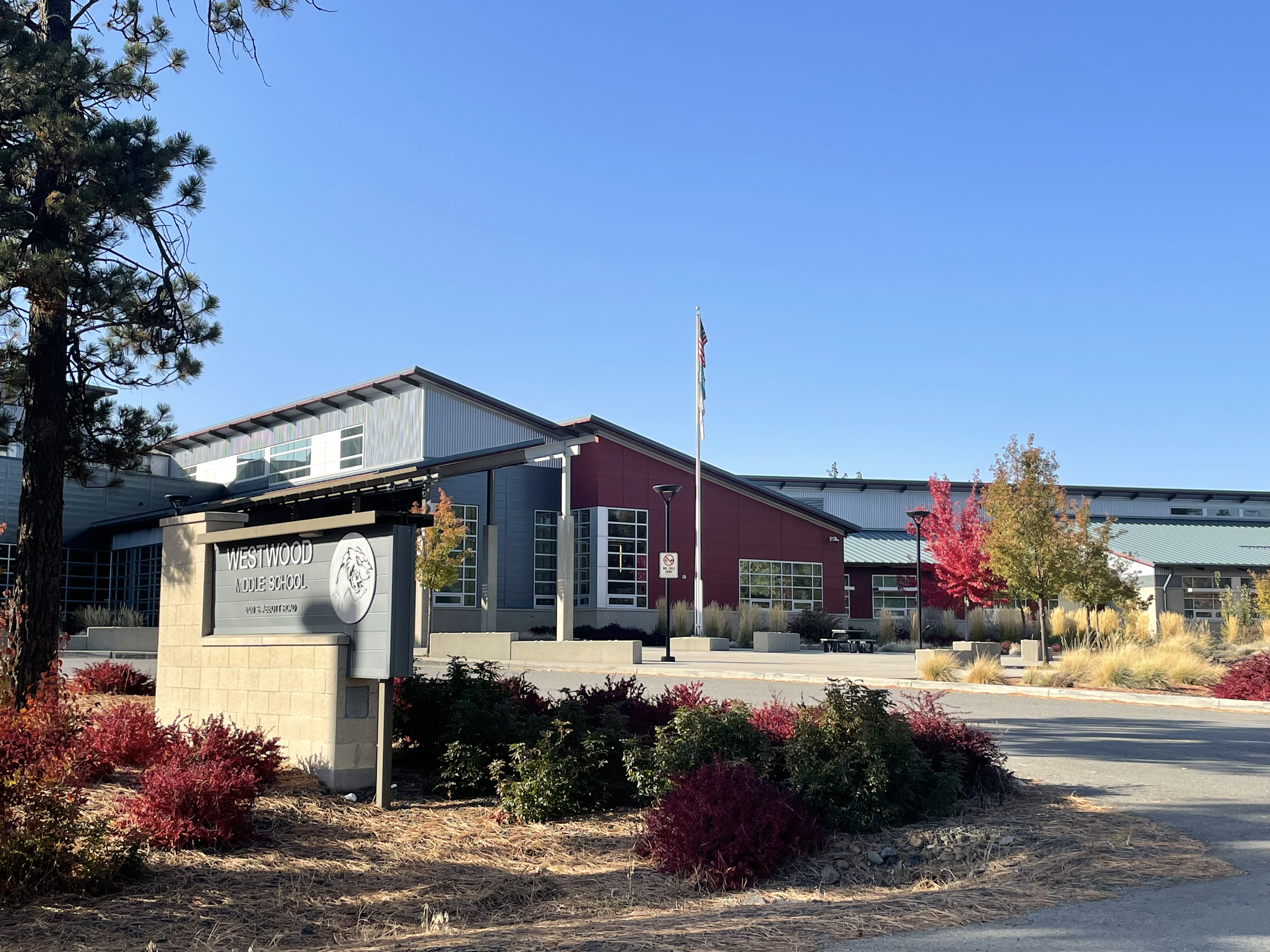
Westwood Middle School, constructed in 2012.

Originally built in the 1960s as housing for workers at nearby Fairchild Air Force Base, Geiger Heights contains 226 single-family and duplex style homes, all single story. The Air Force decided to close the housing development post 9-11 due to security concerns and a desire to have personnel living on a protected base. The last resident from Fairchild moved out in 2004 and the houses remained empty for a few years until they went on to the public market. The development is now privately owned and called Windsor Crossing.

Windsor Elementary School, on the north side of Hallett Road across from the residential subdivision was initially built in 1960 and has been remodeled three times: in 1993, 2002 and 2019. Westwood Middle School, located right next to the elementary school, was built in 2012.
