= Michael P. Anderson =

American astronaut and scientist (1959–2003)

Michael Anderson
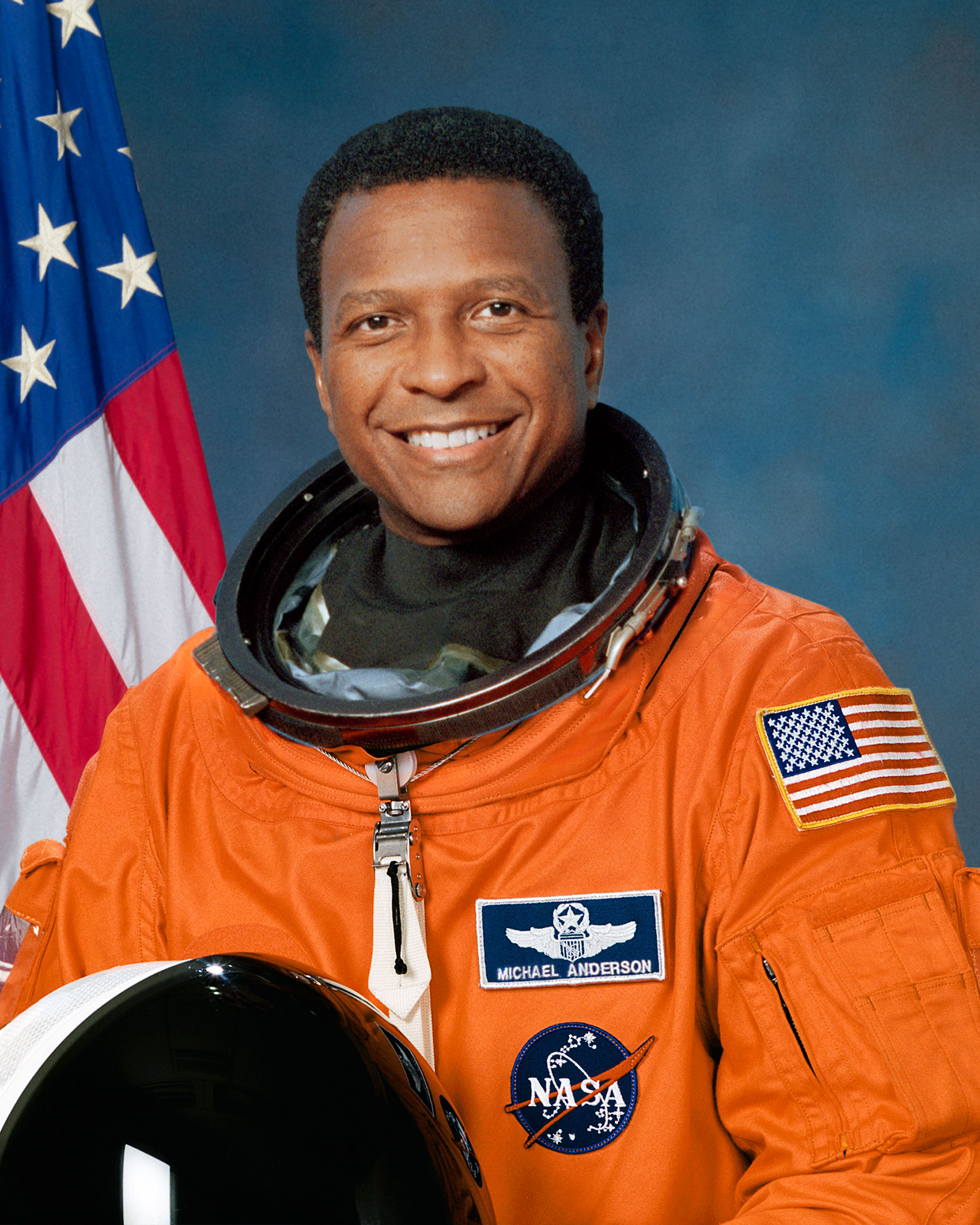
- 2001 portrait
- Born: Michael Phillip Anderson; December 25, 1959; Plattsburgh, New York, U.S.
- Died: February 1, 2003 (aged 43); Over Texas, U.S.
- Cause of death: Space Shuttle Columbia disaster
- Education: University of Washington (BS); Creighton University (MS)
- Awards: Congressional Space Medal of Honor
- Space career

NASA astronaut
- Rank: Lieutenant Colonel, USAF
- Time in space: 24d 18h 8m
- Selection: NASA Group 15 (1994)
- Mission: STS-89; STS-107
- Mission insignia

Michael Phillip Anderson (December 25, 1959 – February 1, 2003) was a United States Air Force officer and NASA astronaut. He and his six fellow crew members were killed in the Space Shuttle Columbia disaster when the craft disintegrated during its re-entry into the Earth's atmosphere. Anderson served as the payload commander and lieutenant colonel in charge of science experiments on the Columbia. He was posthumously awarded the Congressional Space Medal of Honor.

== Early life and education ==
Michael Philip Anderson was born in Plattsburgh, New York on December 25, 1959, to Barbara and Bobbie Anderson. He was their third child and only son. Bobbie serviced jets at Plattsburgh Air Force Base in Plattsburgh and was transferred to Fairchild Air Force Base, about 12 miles (19 km) away from Spokane, Washington, which Anderson spoke of as his hometown. Anderson graduated from Cheney High School in Cheney, Washington, one of four African Americans in a class of 200 students.

In 1981, Anderson graduated with a Bachelor of Science degree in physics and astronomy from the University of Washington in Seattle. In 1990, he earned a Master of Science degree in physics from Creighton University in Omaha, Nebraska.

== Air Force career ==
Upon Anderson's graduation from the University of Washington, he was commissioned a second lieutenant in the U.S. Air Force. After completing a year of technical training at Keesler Air Force Base in Mississippi, Anderson was assigned to Randolph Air Force Base in Texas. At Randolph, he served as chief of communication maintenance for the 2015th Communication Squadron and later as director of information system maintenance for the 1920th Information System Group.

In 1986, Anderson was selected to attend Undergraduate Pilot Training at Vance Air Force Base, Oklahoma. Upon graduation, he was assigned to the 2d Airborne Command and Control Squadron, Offutt Air Force Base, Nebraska as an EC-135 pilot, flying the Strategic Air Command's airborne command post code-named "Looking Glass." Anderson completed his master's degree while stationed at Offutt.

From January 1991 to September 1992, Anderson served as an aircraft commander and instructor pilot in the 920th Air Refueling Squadron, Wurtsmith Air Force Base, Michigan.

From September 1992 to February 1995, Anderson was assigned as an instructor pilot and tactics officer in the 380th Air Refueling Wing, Plattsburgh Air Force Base, New York.

Anderson logged more than 3,000 hours of flight time when NASA selected him for astronaut training in December 1994. Anderson was one of 19 candidates selected from a pool of 2,962 applicants.

=== Special honors ===
- Distinguished graduate, USAF Communication Electronics Officers course
- The Armed Forces Communication Electronics Associations Academic Excellence Award
- Undergraduate Pilot Training Academic Achievement Award for Class 87-08 Vance AFB

== NASA ==
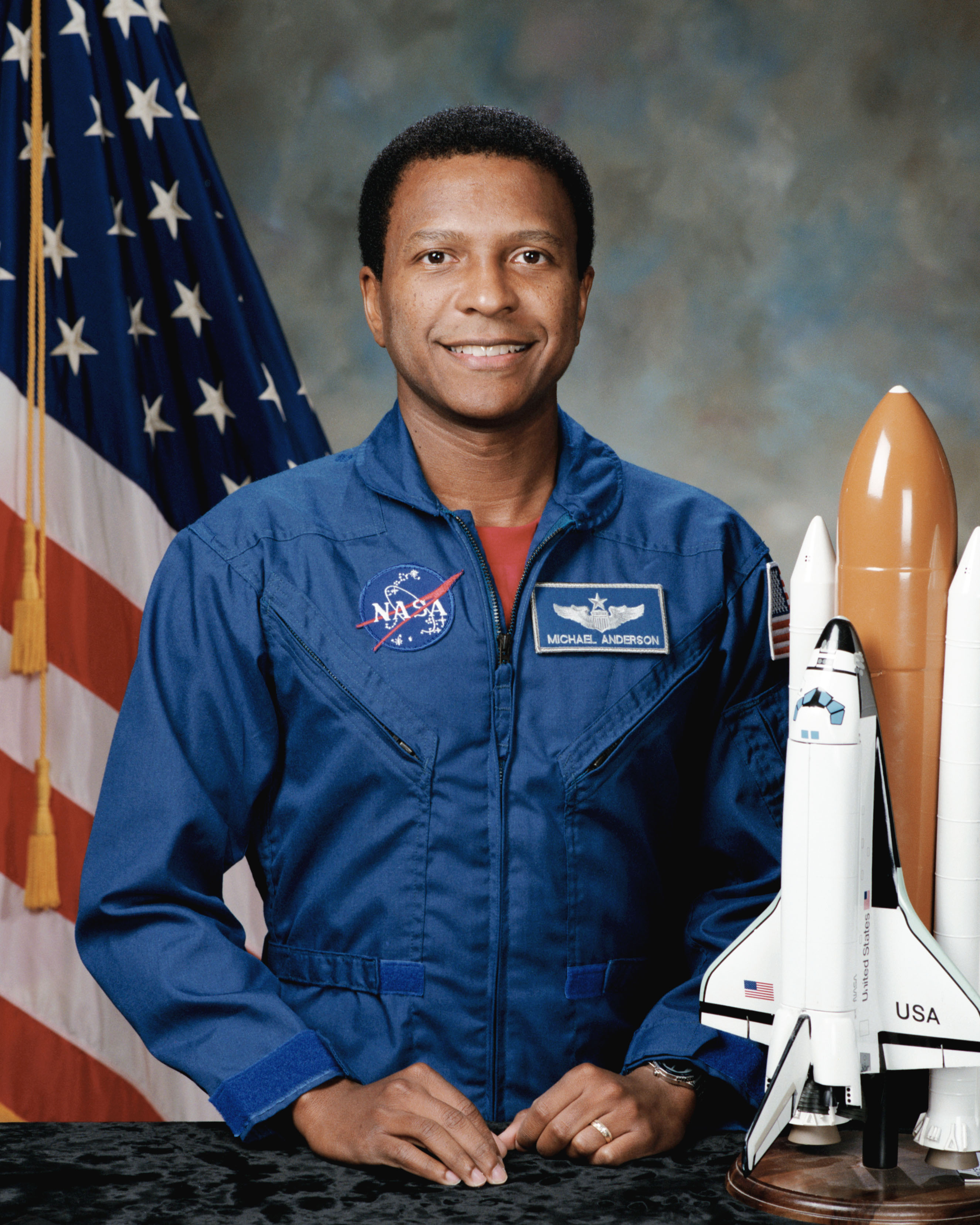
Anderson in 1995

Anderson reported to the Johnson Space Center in March 1995. He completed a year of training and evaluation, and was qualified for flight crew assignment as a mission specialist. Anderson was initially assigned technical duties in the Flight Support Branch of the Astronaut Office, but went on to log more than 593 hours in space aboard two Space Shuttle missions.

=== Space Shuttle missions ===
==== Endeavour ====
Anderson was a mission specialist on STS-89 Endeavour (January 22–31, 1998), the eighth Shuttle-to-Mir Space Station docking mission, during which the crew delivered over 9,000 pounds of scientific equipment, logistical hardware, and water.

In the fifth and last exchange of a U.S. astronaut, STS-89 delivered Andy Thomas to Mir and returned with David Wolf. The mission's duration was 8 days, 19 hours, and 47 seconds, traveling 3.6 million miles in 138 orbits of the Earth.

==== Columbia ====
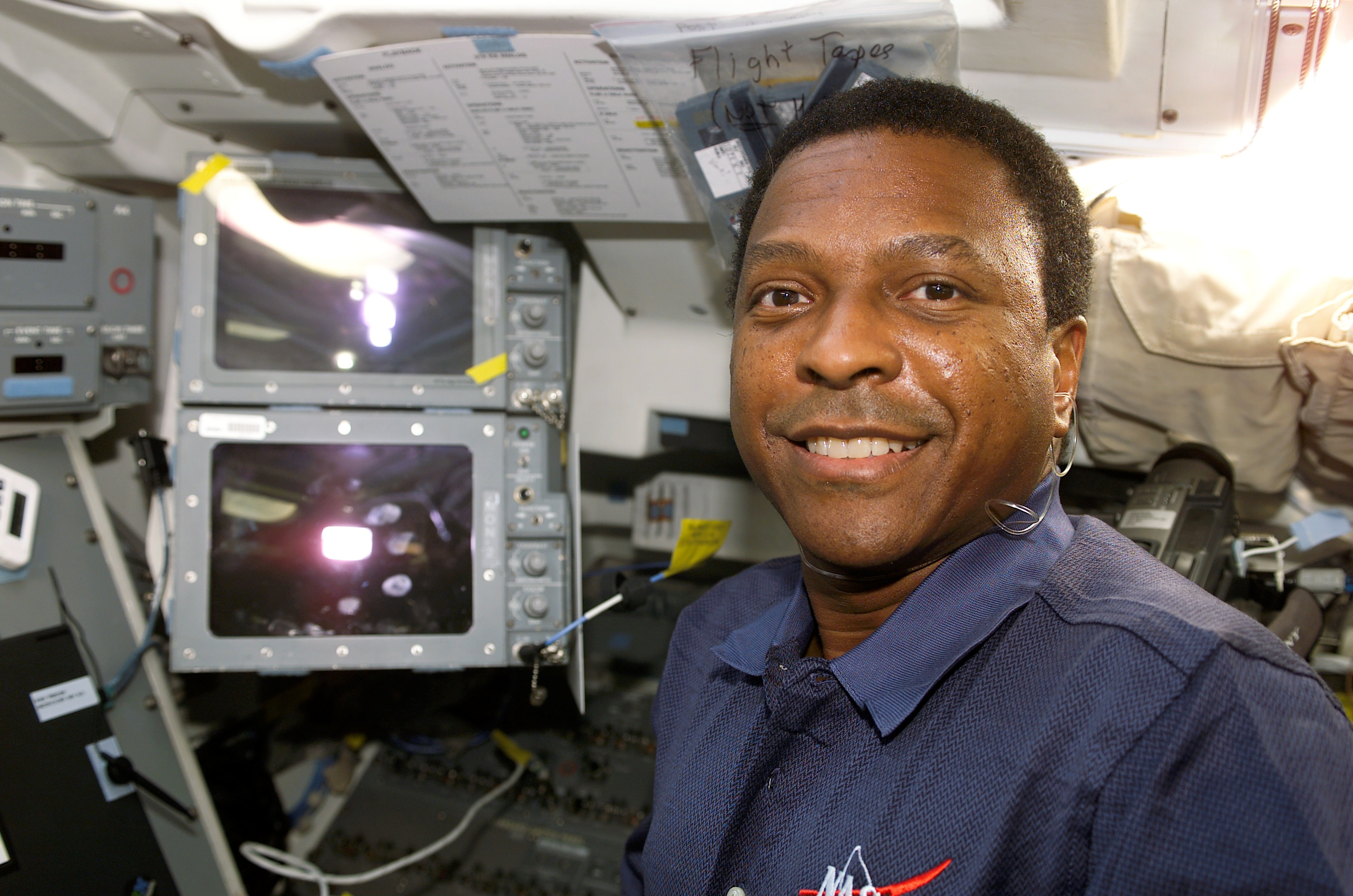
Anderson during the STS-107 mission

STS-107 Space Shuttle Columbia (January 16–February 1, 2003). Anderson served as payload commander and lieutenant colonel in charge of science experiments on the Columbia, NASA's oldest shuttle. On February 1, 2003, the shuttle was returning to Earth after a successful 16-day trip to orbit, where the crew had conducted more than 80 scientific experiments.

Unbeknownst to her crew, the orbiter had suffered critical damage during its launch on January 16, when foam from the fuel tank's insulation fell off and tore a hole in Columbia's left wing. During re-entry, the hole allowed super-hot atmospheric gases to penetrate the orbiter's wing, leading to its destruction. The mission's duration was 15 days, 22 hours, and 20 minutes.

Along with the rest of the STS-107 crew, Anderson was killed upon reentry when the shuttle disintegrated over Texas.

The Columbia Accident Investigation Board reported that, in addition to the Columbia's physical damage, NASA's management culture was partly responsible for the disaster.

== Quotes ==
Prior to the final launch of the Columbia, Anderson told reporters: "There's always that unknown."

== Personal life ==
Anderson had a wife, Sandra Hawkins, and two daughters, Kaycee and Sydney. He also had three sisters.

Anderson and his family lived in Houston at the time of his death, where they attended Grace Community Church. Anderson sang tenor in the church's choir.

== Awards ==
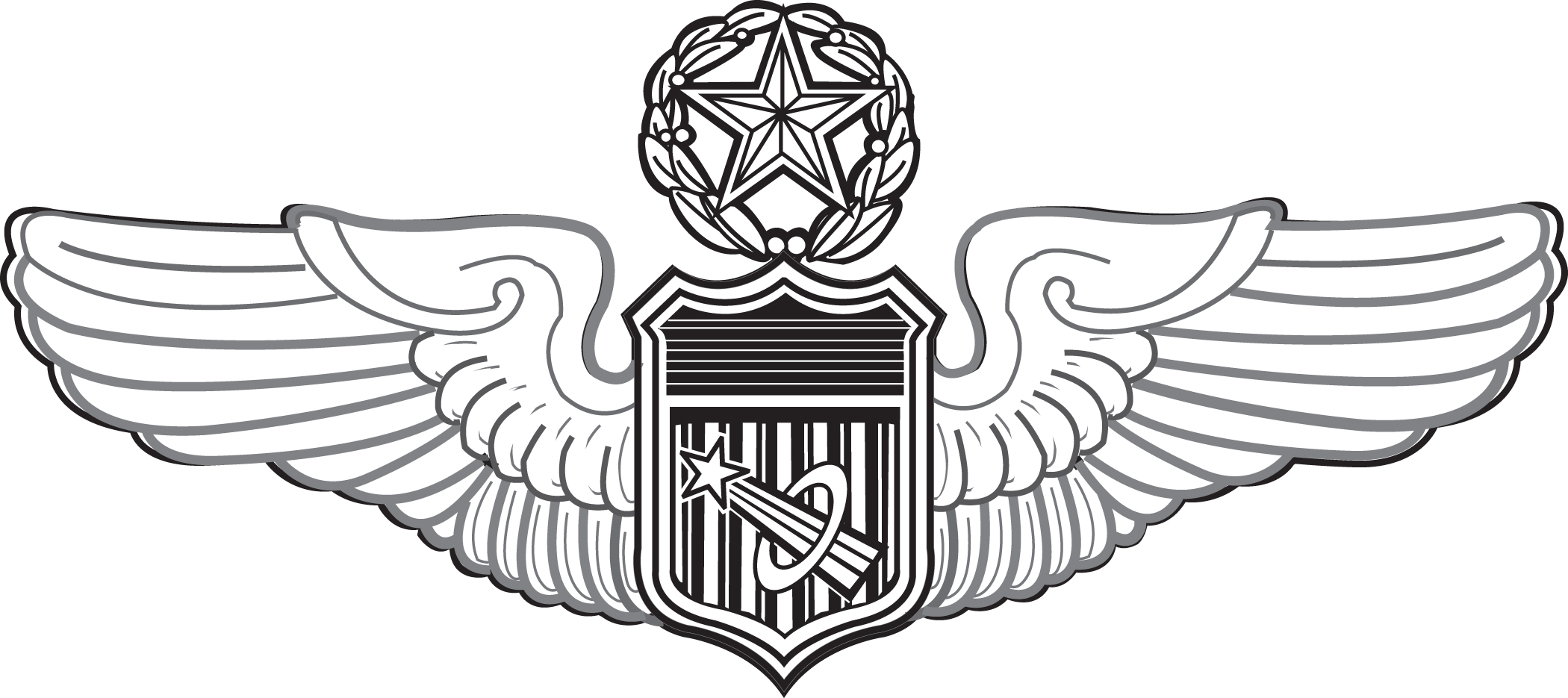

Air Force Command Pilot Astronaut badge
Defense Distinguished Service Medal ^{†}	Defense Superior Service Medal	Meritorious Service Medal	Air Force Achievement Medal with cluster
National Defense Service Medal	Congressional Space Medal of Honor ^{†}	NASA Distinguished Service Medal ^{†}	NASA Space Flight Medal ^{†}
The ^{†} symbol indicates a posthumous award.

== Legacy and tributes ==
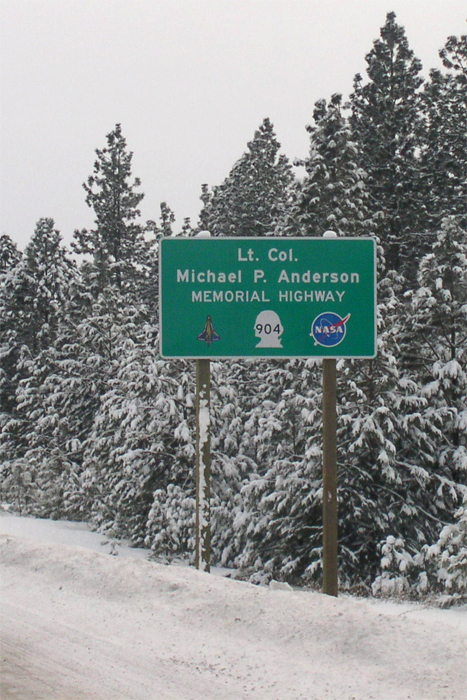
Sign along Washington State Route 904, commemorating Lt. Col. Michael P. Anderson.

- State Route 904, running through Cheney, Washington, where Anderson graduated from high school, was renamed in his memory.
- The science and math wing of Cheney High School is dedicated to his memory.
- Asteroid 51824 Mikeanderson was posthumously named after Anderson.
- Anderson Hall, in the Columbia Village apartments at the Florida Institute of Technology is named after him.
- Anderson Plaza, the green space in front of the Hixson-Lied Science Center at Creighton University was named after him in a compromise between the student body, who wanted the Science Center named for Anderson, and the administration who had already sold the naming rights to the Hixson-Lied family.
- Blair Elementary School on Fairchild Air Force Base in Washington was renamed Michael Anderson Elementary School in January 2004. Anderson attended the school as a fifth-grader.
- Avondale Elementary School in Avondale, Arizona was renamed Michael Anderson Elementary in his honor. Anderson attended school there when he was in the third grade, and one of the school T-shirts was aboard the Columbia on its last voyage.
- In 2003, Anderson was inducted into the International Forest of Friendship, in Atchison, KS as part of a memorial to the Columbia astronauts.
- Anderson Park in Canton, Mississippi was dedicated in June 2004.
- An outdoor bronze statue of Anderson was unveiled in Spokane in June 2005. Larger-than-life, it was created by local artist Dorothy Fowler, and shows Anderson kneeling with his helmet in one hand and a dove in the other.
- A duplicate statue was dedicated at the Museum of Flight in Seattle in June 2009 and the museum launched an aerospace program in his honor.
- An outdoor mural in the city of Plattsburgh was unveiled in October 2020 honoring Anderson. On July 4, 2021, the city of Plattsburgh held a dedication for the mural, where the Anderson family was given a key to the city and led the annual Independence Day parade.
- Lunar crater M. Anderson is named after Anderson.
- The Creighton University Physics Department, from which Anderson received his master's degree, maintains a statue and physics scholarship in his honor.

== See also ==
- List of African-American astronauts
- Space Shuttle Columbia disaster
- Space science
