= Four Lakes, Washington =

- Census-designated place
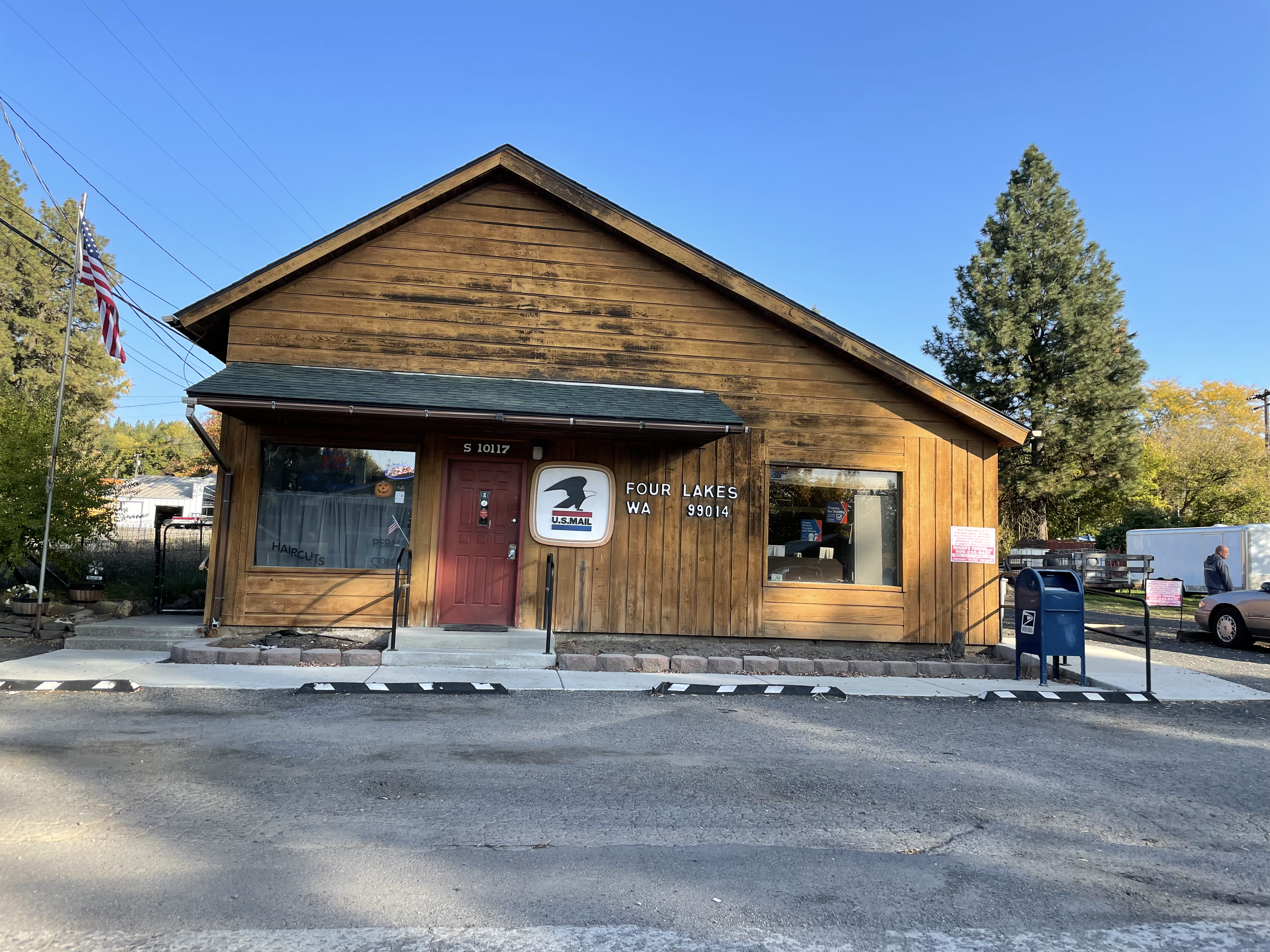

- Location within Washington (state)
- Coordinates: 47°33′27″N 117°34′55″W
- Country: United States
- State: Washington
- County: Spokane

Area
  - Total: 3.428 sq mi (8.88 km^{2})
  - Land: 3.375 sq mi (8.74 km^{2})
  - Water: 0.053 sq mi (0.14 km^{2})
- Elevation: 2,592 ft (790 m)

Population (2010)
  - Total: 512
  - Density: 152/sq mi (58.6/km^{2})
- Time zone: UTC-8 (Pacific (PST))
  - Summer (DST): UTC-7 (PDT)
- ZIP code: 99004
- Area code: 509
- GNIS feature ID: 2584975

Four Lakes is an unincorporated community and census-designated place in Spokane County, Washington, United States, just southwest of the city of Spokane, and north of Cheney. As of the 2020 census, Four Lakes had a population of 537. Both Interstate 90 and SR 904 run through Four Lakes and the junction of the two is located near the center of town.

Four Lakes was founded in 1879 by G.H. Morgan. The community was so named on account of there being four lakes near the original town site. It is speculated the fourth lake, is now a marsh south of Meadow Lake, which was drained by the ditch, blasted through basalt, which Minnie Creek flows through, under SR 904, south of the rodeo grounds.

== Economy ==
Largely because Four Lakes is a bedroom community for its neighbors such as Cheney and Spokane, there are very few businesses as of 2022. A hair salon, a tavern, a dog grooming business, and a convenience store are among the small handful of businesses that call Four Lakes home. Most of the businesses in Four Lakes have been located there for many years and are firmly rooted. Farms are also plentiful around Four Lakes. The small community has its own post office, water district, and volunteer fire department.

== Schools ==
A school for first through eighth grade students operated in Four Lakes from 1917 to 1959, when it merged into the Cheney School District. Most elementary students in Four Lakes now attend Betz Elementary, while older students attend either Cheney High School or Cheney Middle School. A very small fraction of high school-age students may attend Three Springs High School in Cheney.

== The Battle of Four Lakes ==
The Battle of Four Lakes was a battle during the Coeur d'Alene War of 1858 in the Washington Territory (now the states of Washington and Idaho) in the United States. The Coeur d'Alene War was part of the Yakima War, which began in 1855. The battle was fought near present-day Four Lakes, Washington, between elements of the United States Army and a coalition of Native American tribes consisting of Schitsu'umsh (Coeur d'Alene), Palus, Spokan, and Yakama warriors.

== Climate ==
This climatic region is typified by large seasonal temperature differences, with warm to hot (and often humid) summers and cold (sometimes severely cold) winters. According to the Köppen Climate Classification system, Four Lakes has a humid continental climate, abbreviated "Dfb" on climate maps.

== Demographics ==
Historical population
Census	Pop.	Note	%±
2010	512		—
2020	537		4.9%
U.S. Decennial Census; 2000 2010

Four Lakes first appeared as a census designated place in the 2010 U.S. census.

=== Racial and ethnic composition ===
Four Lakes CDP, Washington – Racial and ethnic composition Note: the US Census treats Hispanic/Latino as an ethnic category. This table excludes Latinos from the racial categories and assigns them to a separate category. Hispanics/Latinos may be of any race.
Race / Ethnicity (NH = Non-Hispanic)	Pop 2010	Pop 2020	% 2010	% 2020
White alone (NH)	469	459	91.60%	85.47%
Black or African American alone (NH)	1	1	0.20%	0.19%
Native American or Alaska Native alone (NH)	4	5	0.78%	0.93%
Asian alone (NH)	6	6	1.17%	1.12%
Native Hawaiian or Pacific Islander alone (NH)	0	2	0.00%	0.37%
Other race alone (NH)	0	1	0.00%	0.19%
Mixed race or Multiracial (NH)	21	34	4.10%	6.33%
Hispanic or Latino (any race)	11	29	2.15%	5.40%
Total	512	537	100.00%	100.00%

== Education ==
The community is served by the Cheney School District.
