= Marshall, Washington =

Unincorporated community in Washington, United States

- Unincorporated community
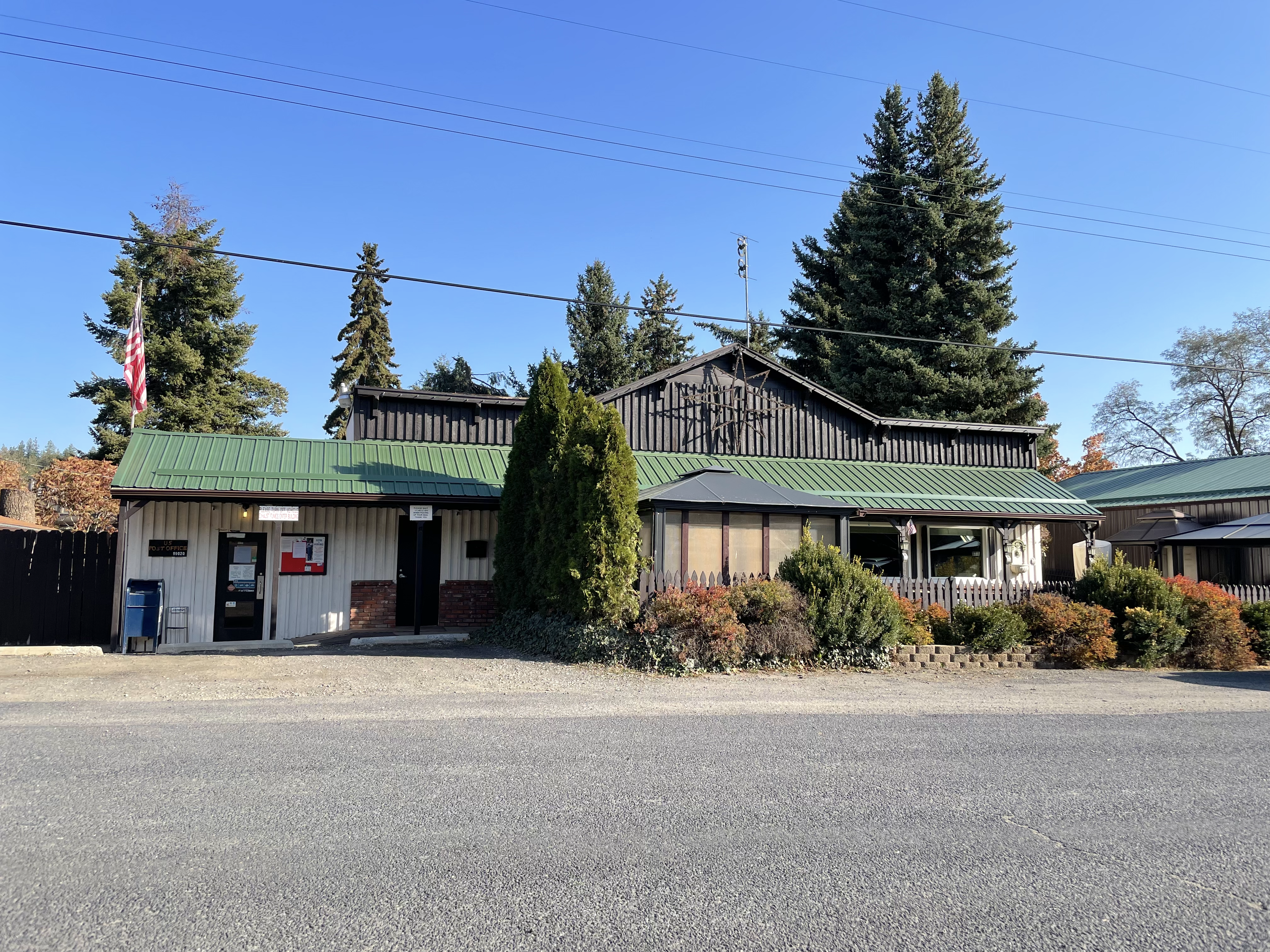

- Location within Washington (state)
- Coordinates: 47°33′54″N 117°29′58″W
- Country: United States
- State: Washington
- County: Spokane
- Elevation: 2,234 ft (681 m)
- Time zone: UTC-8 (Pacific (PST))
  - Summer (DST): UTC-7 (PDT)
- ZIP code: 99020
- Area code: 509
- GNIS feature ID: 1509691

Marshall is an unincorporated community in Spokane County, Washington, United States. Named in 1880 for early settler William H. Marshall, Marshall has a post office with ZIP code 99020.

== Geography ==
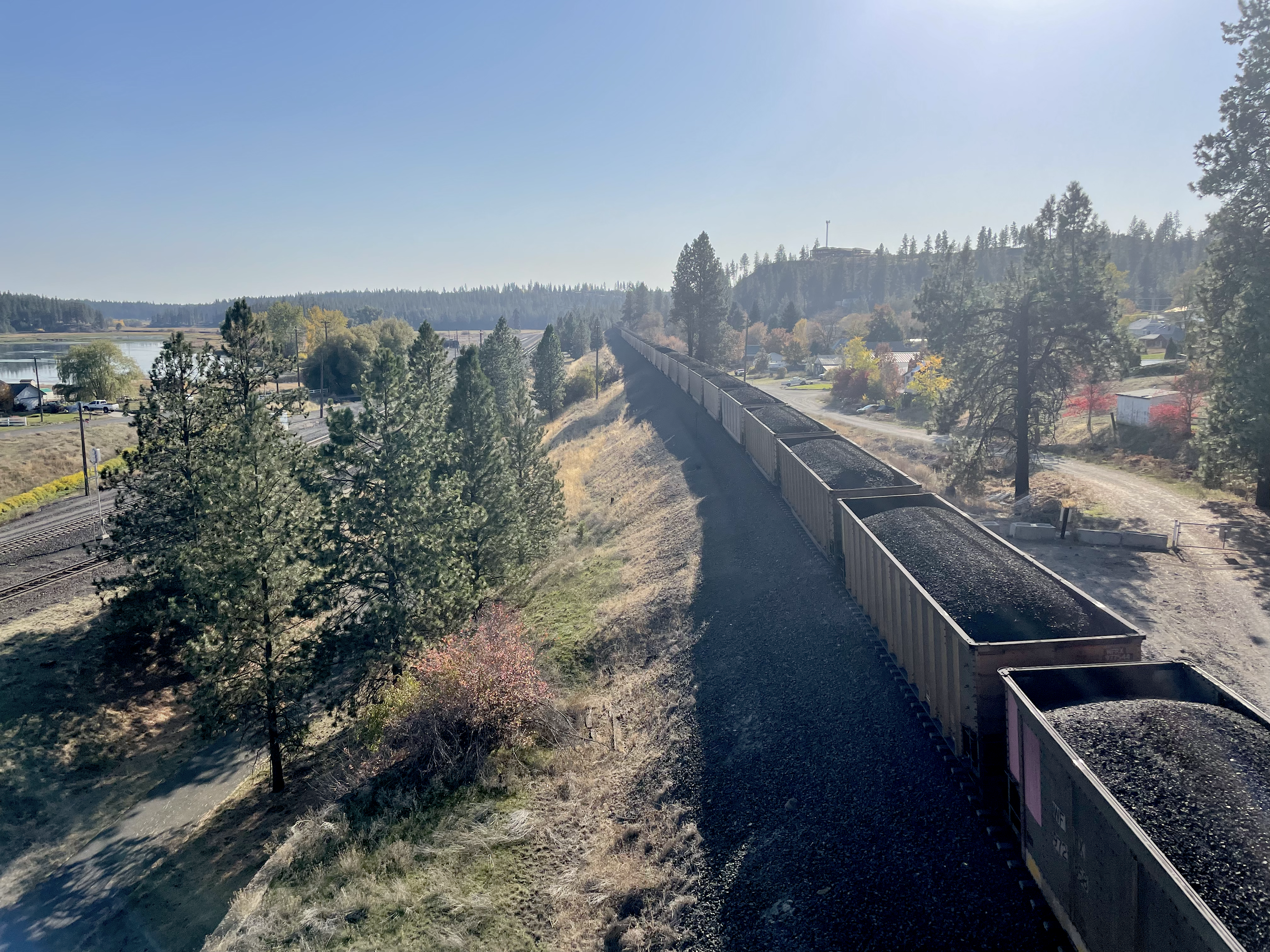
Railroad tracks passing through Marshall, with the main community on the right.

Marshall is 8 miles (13 km) south-southwest of downtown Spokane. Marshall lies approximately halfway between Cheney and Spokane on Cheney-Spokane Road. The surrounding area is mostly flat and rocky, as it is part of the Columbia Plateau, but the community itself is located in a half-mile wide valley carved by Marshall Creek. The creek flows north-northeast through the community to Latah Creek and provides the route for Cheney-Spokane Road between Marshall and Spokane.

Multiple rail tracks pass through Marshall including Union Pacific and the Lakeside Subdivision of the BNSF Railway. The Portland arm of Amtrak's Empire Builder passes through, but does not stop in, Marshall on its way to and from the Spokane Intermodal Center.

The area is home to many ponderosa pines and basalt outcroppings. The community itself is mostly residential, but there is also a post office and community church. A quarry is located immediately north Cheney-Spokane Road.

== History ==
The first road passing through what would become Marshall was laid in 1870. William Marshall, the town's namesake, arrived in 1878 and set up a sawmill two years later, which spurred growth in the community. The post office was established in March of the same year. The Spokane, Portland and Seattle Railway came through the town in the early 1900s. A school district was operated in Marshall until 1960 when it was merged with the Cheney school district.

Marshall was the site of a train derailment on the Northern Pacific line in August 1921.

From the early 1900s Marshall was one of the 47 townships in Spokane County that were each sent one representative to the county's government to represent the interests of the people of their township. The township included land that is now within the Spokane city limits.
