= Washington State Route 904 =

State highway in Spokane County, Washington, US

State Route 904
- Lt. Col. Michael P. Anderson Memorial Highway
- SR 904 highlighted in red

Route information
- Auxiliary route of I-90
- Maintained by WSDOT
- Length: 16.96 mi (27.29 km)
- Existed: 1964–present

Major junctions
- West end: I-90 / US 395 in Tyler
- East end: I-90 / US 395 in Four Lakes

Location
- Country: United States
- State: Washington
- County: Spokane

Highway system
- State highways in Washington; Interstate; US; State; Scenic; Pre-1964; 1964 renumbering; Former
← SR 903	→ SR 906

State Route 904 (SR 904, named the Lt. Col. Michael P. Anderson Memorial Highway) is a 16.96-mile (27.29 km) long state highway in the U.S. state of Washington, located entirely in Spokane County. The route starts at an interchange with Interstate 90 (I-90) and U.S. Route 395 (US 395) in Tyler and travels to Cheney, serving Eastern Washington University, before ending at I-90 and US 395 in Four Lakes. The roadway, named First Street in Downtown Cheney, is paralleled by three rail lines, a BNSF Railway route that carries Amtrak's Empire Builder, a Union Pacific route and the Eastern Washington Gateway Railroad.

The Central Washington Highway was established in 1913 and served Cheney via the current route of SR 904. The highway's designation was changed starting in 1923, when it became State Road 11. US 395 was extended southwest from Spokane to Pasco between 1933 and 1939. In 1937, State Road 11 became Primary State Highway 11 (PSH 11), which was concurrent with both US 395 and US 10 by 1940. A bypass of Cheney between Tyler and Four Lakes was planned at the same time as the Interstate Highway System. I-90 was created and PSH 11 was routed onto the future alignment in 1957. Secondary State Highway 11H (SSH 11H) used the original route and became SR 904 during the 1964 highway renumbering. The Cheney bypass was opened in 1966. After the Space Shuttle Columbia disintegrated during re-entry during STS-107 in 2003, killing all seven crewmembers, the road was renamed the Lt. Col. Michael P. Anderson Memorial Highway after the mission's payload commander who was raised in Cheney. The Washington State Department of Transportation (WSDOT) is currently planning to widen SR 904 between Cheney and Four Lakes from two to five lanes as part of the route development plan, but no funds have been made available for the work.

== Route description ==
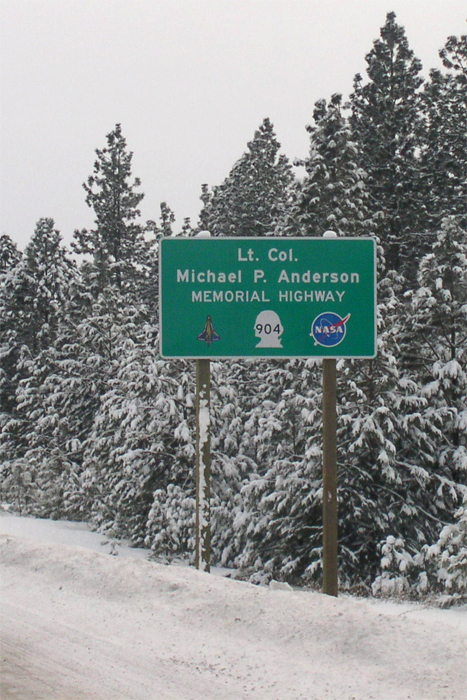
A sign on SR 904 commemorating Lt. Col. Michael P. Anderson, one of the Columbia astronauts on STS-107.

State Route 904 (SR 904) begins at a diamond interchange with Interstate 90 (I-90), concurrent with U.S. Route 395 (US 395) in Tyler. Traveling northeast over an unnamed creek to Babb, the highway becomes parallel with a rail line owned by BNSF Railway and used by Amtrak's Empire Builder route from Portland, Oregon to Spokane. The BNSF line is paralleled by a Union Pacific rail line while the roadway and railways enter Cheney. Within Cheney, the road is named First Street and passes Eastern Washington University. SR 904 turns north, now parallel to the Eastern Washington Gateway Railroad, at an intersection with the Cheney–Spokane Road, which was the busiest intersection on the highway, with an estimated daily average of 13,000 motorists in 2007. After the intersection, the road turns northwest to exit Cheney and intersect the old alignment of Primary State Highway 11 (PSH 11). Shortly afterwards, the roadway enters Four Lakes, passing Meadow Lake and leaving the Eastern Washington Gateway Railroad before ending at a trumpet interchange with I-90 and US 395.

== History ==
Prior to the opening of the Cheney bypass in 1957, U.S. Route 395 (left) and Primary State Highway 11 (right) used present-day SR 904 to travel between Tyler and Four Lakes.

The first state–maintained highway to serve Cheney using the present-day route of SR 904 was the Central Washington Highway, added to the state highway system in 1913. The highway served Pasco, Ritzville, Cheney and Spokane, but the segment between Cheney and Four Lakes wasn't completed until after 1919. The Central Washington Highway became State Road 11 in a 1923 restructuring of the highway system. Between 1933 and 1939, U.S. Route 395 (US 395) was extended southwest from Spokane to Pasco, via Cheney. The state roads became Primary state highways in 1937 and hence, Primary State Highway 11 (PSH 11) was established to replace State Road 11. US 10 later became concurrent with US 395 and PSH 11 in 1940 after it was moved to a southern alignment.

On June 29, 1956, President Dwight D. Eisenhower signed the Federal Aid Highway Act of 1956 into law, establishing a system of freeways that would later become the Interstate Highway System. Included in the system was Interstate 90, which was to replace US 10 and become concurrent with US 395, while bypassing Cheney. PSH 11, US 395 and I-90 were rerouted onto the future bypass in 1957. The former highway from Tyler to Four Lakes became Secondary State Highway 11H (SSH 11H) in 1961; the Cheney bypass opened on November 18, 1966. During the 1964 highway renumbering, SSH 11H became SR 904, part of the new highway system, then named the "sign routes". During STS-107, a NASA Space Shuttle mission, Lieutenant colonel Michael P. Anderson, a Cheney native, along with the rest of the Columbia's crew, were killed when it disintegrated during re-entry on February 1, 2003. SR 904 was posthumously renamed to the Lt. Col. Michael P. Anderson Memorial Highway in his honor later that February. The official dedication ceremony was held on August 1, 2003. Increasing traffic accidents and traffic has caused the Washington State Department of Transportation (WSDOT) to create plans to widen the roadway between Cheney and Four Lakes. The plans, later named the route development plan, calls for a five-lane highway with new intersections built on the highway.

== Major intersections ==
The entire highway is in Spokane County.

Location	mi	km	Destinations	Notes
Tyler	0.00	0.00	I-90 west / US 395 south – Seattle, Pasco, Ritzville	I-90 exit 257; western terminus; interchange.
Four Lakes	15.73	25.31	Old PSH 11	
Four Lakes	16.96	27.29	I-90 east / US 395 north – Spokane, Colville, Kettle Falls	I-90 exit 270; eastern terminus; interchange.
1.000 mi = 1.609 km; 1.000 km = 0.621 mi
