= Cheney School District =

School in Washington, US

Address
- 12414 South Andrus Road Cheney, Washington, 99004-1695; United States
- Coordinates: 47.541581°N 117.546417°W

District information
- Grades: K–12
- Established: 1887; 139 years ago
- Superintendent: Ben Ferney
- NCES District ID: 5301230
- District ID: 360

Students and staff
- Students: 5,268 (2017-2018)
- Student–teacher ratio: 17.10

Other information
- Website: www.cheneysd.org

Cheney School District No. 360 is a public school district in Spokane County, Washington and serves the towns of Cheney, Airway Heights, and the surrounding area. The district offers classes from Kindergarten to Grade 12.

The majority of the school district is in Spokane County. There, it includes Cheney, Four Lakes, the majority of Airway Heights, and portions of Spokane. A portion of the district is in Whitman County.

As of 2018, the district had an enrollment of 4,743 and serves an area of 378 square miles (980 km^{2}).

== Schools ==
=== High schools ===
- Cheney High School
- Cheney Alternative High School (Three Springs High School)

=== Middle schools ===
- Cheney Middle School
- Westwood Middle School

=== Elementary schools ===
- Betz Elementary School
- Salnave Elementary School
- Snowdon Elementary School
- Sunset Elementary School
- Windsor Elementary School

== Enrollment ==
Enrollment in Cheney School District (32360)
Year	Total	Grade													
Year	Total	PK	K	1	2	3	4	5	6	7	8	9	10	11	12
2010–11	3,989	49	324	317	299	286	291	295	299	275	325	308	291	336	294
2011–12	4,094	62	342	337	328	309	283	292	299	307	300	335	303	295	302
2012–13	4,156	52	360	340	334	329	295	297	293	308	319	315	343	307	264
2013–14	4,224	72	363	346	328	332	318	298	299	314	336	302	300	340	276
2014–15	4,465	103	366	370	353	336	345	331	320	320	328	346	309	313	325
2015–16	4,555	108	363	352	364	385	328	355	350	342	338	320	335	304	311
2016–17	4,699	111	381	381	352	360	386	356	359	345	361	330	318	339	320

== History ==
Cheney School District was established in 1887, four years after the incorporation of the city. William J. Sutton served as the first principal. By 1960, Cheney encompassed the largest area of any school district in the state of Washington. The district serves residents in a 378-square-mile (980 km^{2}) area, comparable to the size of Dallas, accumulating 550,000 miles (890,000 km) annually on 47 buses.

Cheney School District administration was based in the Fisher Building from 1977 to 2012, formerly built as Cheney High School in 1930. In 2012, administrators moved into the site on Andrus Road, a former Nike missile facility designated F-37 (for the defense of nearby Fairchild Air Force Base) which the district had purchased for $29,000 in 2009.

In 2023, Cheney School District was sued for $2 million after a former student had claimed to have been sexually abused by Cheney High School music director Michael Alstad.

=== Robert Reid Lab School ===
Present-day Eastern Washington University (EWU) started as the Benjamin P. Cheney Academy in 1882 and when Washington gained its statehood in 1889, became the Washington State Normal School at Cheney. As part of the normal school's mission to train prospective teachers, a separate Campus School was established in 1892 to facilitate instruction of education students and student teaching of children. A separate building for the Training School was completed in 1908, funded by a $65,000 appropriation. In 1912, a fire destroyed the main building of the Normal School, and the Training School building was appropriated for Normal School classes, with Training School being held temporarily in an 1893 building owned by Cheney Public Schools. A new building, named Martin Hall (after Governor Clarence D. Martin), was completed for the Training School in 1937 at a cost of $284,000. The old Training School building was condemned and demolished in 1940. The Campus or Training School changed its name to the Laboratory School in 1937 with the move to Martin Hall.

The modern building for the Laboratory School, named the Robert Reid Lab School, was built in 1959 immediately west of Martin Hall as a laboratory school at a construction cost of $363,754 for the structure and $41,950 for the land. EWU operated Reid as a separate school district (No. 365) until the 1986–87 academic year, when it began to be jointly operated by the Cheney School District and EWU. EWU was responsible for the costs of operation, and Cheney School District provided teaching staff and equipment. When parents, faculty members, and education students learned that Reid may be closed as other campus capital projects held higher priorities, they held a march in 2007 in protest. Reid retained features unique to laboratory schools, such as one-way glass, microphones, and observation towers to allow education students to observe classes in session with minimal disruption. Following the 2008–09 academic year, Reid was permanently closed as the required overhauls could not be funded as the building was owned by Eastern, not Cheney School District, and few student teachers were using the facilities. The building was demolished in 2015 to make way for new science facilities on campus.

=== Cheney High School (Fisher Building) ===
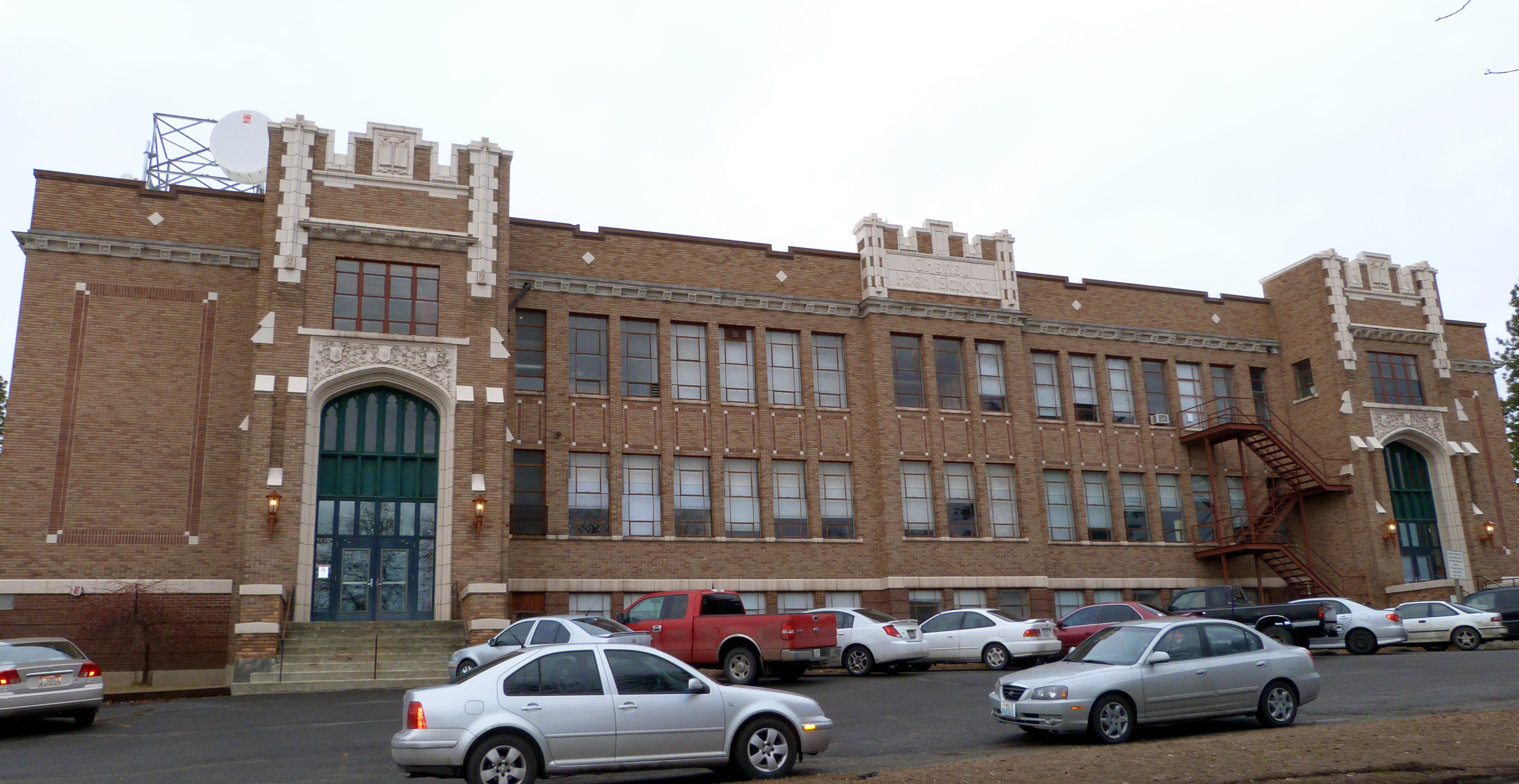
Fisher Building (photographed in 2015)

With the incorporation of several neighboring school districts in 1929, existing school buildings were expected to be overcrowded due to the influx of new students. A plan was presented to local voters proposing that an existing school building (built in 1893) would be demolished and its bricks salvaged to create a new high school at the same site (520 4th St), to cost no more than $125,000. The first event in the new three-story high school was a basketball game, held on January 7, 1930; classes started approximately two weeks later, on January 22.

A new high school was built at 460 N. 6th in 1966, and the 1930 building was repurposed to serve as the junior high school until 1977, when the new Cheney Junior High opened on the edge of town. At that point, the building (then renamed the Fisher Building in honor of educator and Cheney mayor George Fisher) served the district as administrative offices and for special functions until 2013. The building was declared surplus and sold to a developer in 2014. One of the first developers to express interest in the Fisher Building was Cheney alumnus and former NFL player Steve Emtman.

After several failed sale attempts, the Fisher Building was sold to a Seattle developer and converted to Multi Family Housing called the "School House Lofts" in 2017, with 36 apartments aimed at students attending neighboring Eastern Washington University. Portions of the building were preserved in their original configuration, including half the gym and a portion of the balcony on the gym's perimeter. The buyer of the Fisher Building, Eastmark Properties, placed the building on the Cheney Historic Register before finalizing the sale, enabling it to take advantage of tax credits for refurbishing historic buildings.

=== Cheney and Westwood Middle Schools ===
Two identical buildings were completed in 2012 to serve as Cheney Middle School (adjacent to the site of the junior high school constructed in 1977, at 2716 N. 6th) and Westwood Middle School (at the site of Windsor Elementary in unincorporated Spokane County, near Spokane International Airport). The exterior of Cheney Middle School was painted blue, and Westwood was painted red. Each building is 110,705 square feet (10,284.8 m^{2}) and had nearly identical costs of $24 million (Cheney) and $26 million (Westwood), with the extra cost for Westwood required for site preparation. The buildings were designed by NAC Architecture.

=== Snowdon Elementary ===
Ground was broken for a new elementary school in 2012. Cheney School District opened its eighth school building, Snowdon Elementary, for the 2014–15 academic year. Snowdon was named in honor of the late Phil Snowdon, who had served as superintendent of Cheney School District. Students at Snowdon were drawn from the existing Windsor and Sunset elementaries to relieve district overcrowding. Snowdon has 55,500 square feet (5,160 m^{2}) and was also designed by NAC Architecture.
