= Peaceful Valley Historic District =

- U.S. National Register of Historic Places
- U.S. Historic district
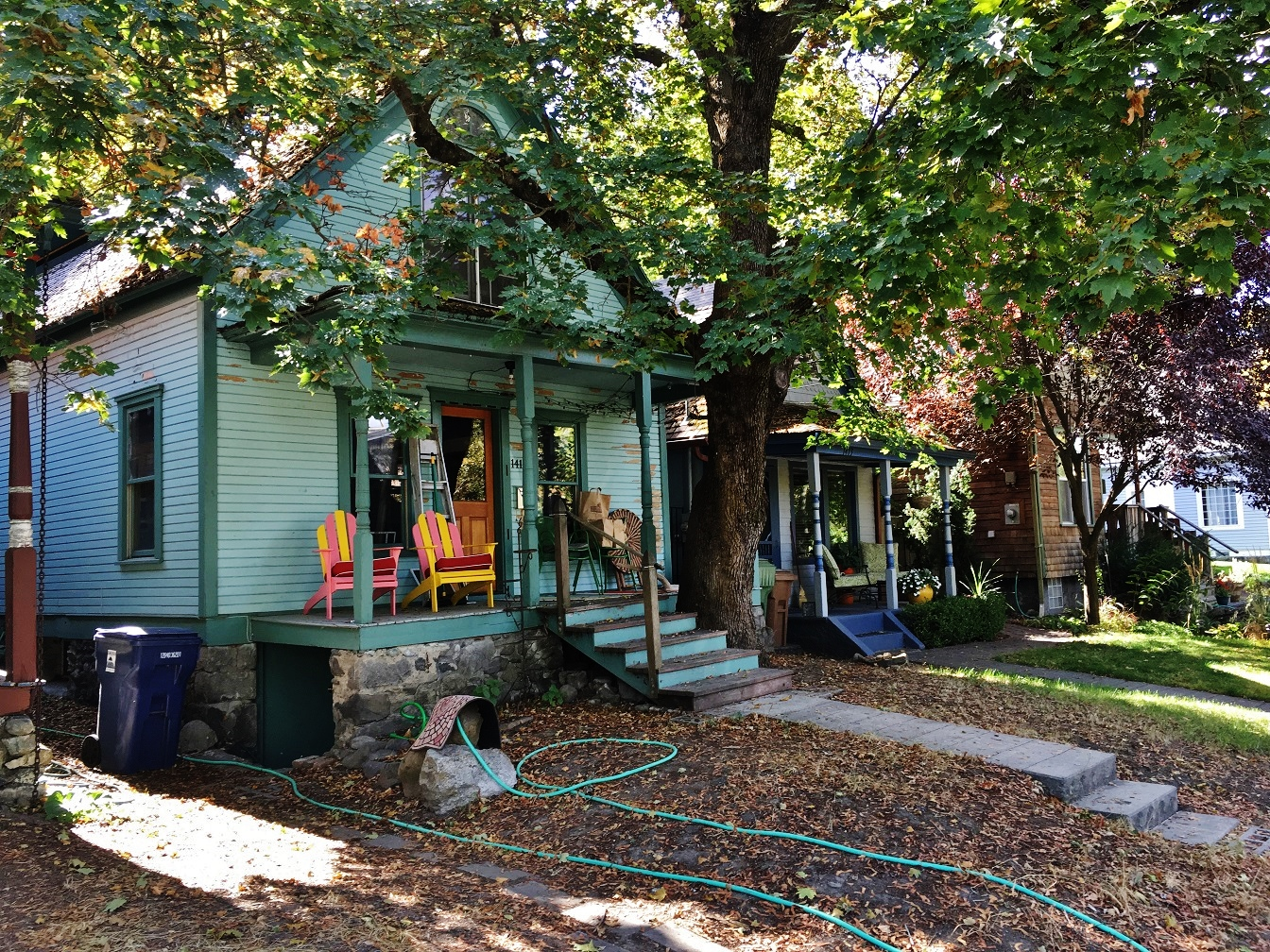
- Typical homes in the district

- Location within Spokane riverfront area Location within Washington (state) Location within the United States
- Location: Peaceful Valley, Spokane, Washington
- Coordinates: 47°39′32.3″N 117°26′06.8″W
- Area: 39.9 acres (16.1 ha)
- Built: 1890s-1940s
- Architect: Multiple
- Architectural style: Multiple
- NRHP reference No.: 84003617
- Added to NRHP: April 19, 1984

The Peaceful Valley Historic District is a National Register of Historic Places-listed historic district in the Peaceful Valley neighborhood of Spokane, Washington. It is located in the western half of the neighborhood, along the floor and southern slope of the Spokane River Gorge, immediately south of the Spokane River and downhill, just below Downtown Spokane. It is centered on the intersection of Main Avenue and Maple Street, stretching from there approximately two blocks in each direction.

A residential area, Peaceful Valley was one of the first areas developed in the City of Spokane and was deemed historically significant as an intact example of a working-class neighborhood from the turn of the 20th century. Unlike many other historic districts around the city and state, Peaceful Valley does not represent the moneyed-elite whose grand homes and buildings have been preserved but rather homes of the working class laborers who helped built Spokane throughout its early decades.

Located in a steep valley just downstream of Spokane Falls and immediately below the city center which lies on the flat land at the top of the valley to the south and east. This location, isolated by the river and deep gorge, have helped preserve Peaceful Valley's architectural character into the 21st century, though some construction projects such as the Maple Street Bridge which was constructed over the area in the late 1950s have slightly altered the appearance in places, though not the overall cohesion, of the district.

== Setting ==
The Peaceful Valley Historic District is located in the Peaceful Valley neighborhood, immediately west and north of Downtown Spokane. The Spokane River runs immediately to the north of the historic district as it cuts a deep gorge flowing west from the Spokane Falls just upstream. The river is at approximately 1,740 feet above sea level as it flows through this portion of the gorge, with the surrounding land at the top of the gorge at approximately 1,880 feet above sea level. The valley from crest to crest is about one-half mile wide here, with areas immediately up and downstream being even thinner. The southern portion of the historic district, around Wilson, Clarke and the eastern portion of Main Avenue sits above the northern portion of the district which lies along the floodplain of the river.

Due to the constraints of the terrain, there are only two roads leading into the historic district. Main Avenue connects to the center of Downtown Spokane from the east while Clarke Avenue runs west into the rest of the Peaceful Valley neighborhood and provides access to the adjacent West Hills and Browne's Addition neighborhoods. A staircase connects Peaceful Valley with downtown, specifically the also-NRHP-listed Riverside Avenue Historic District, at Cedar Street. Just west of that staircase, the Maple Street Bridge crosses over the gorge right through the heart of the district, connecting Downtown and the rest of the south side of the city with the West Central neighborhood and the rest of the north side.

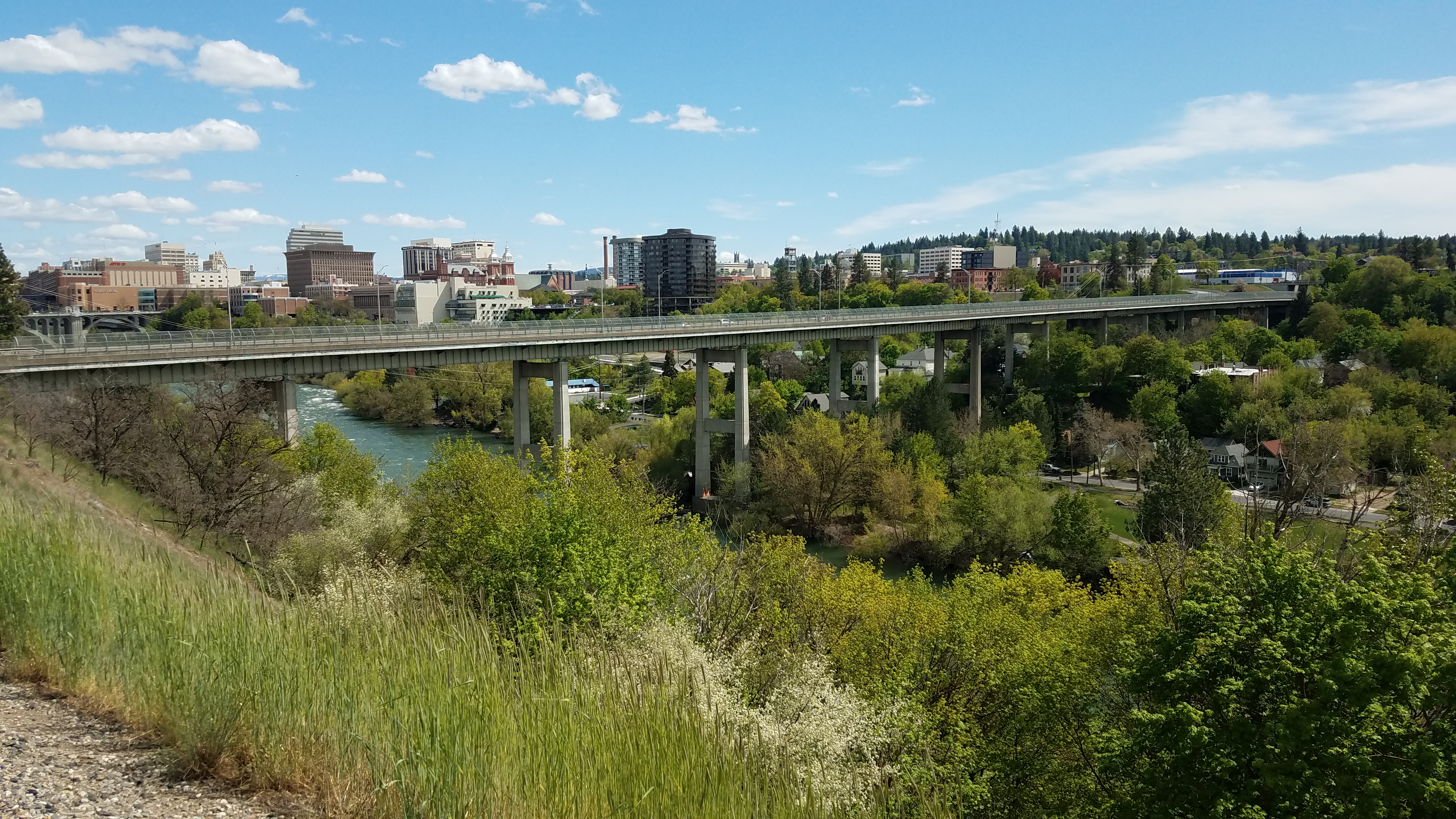
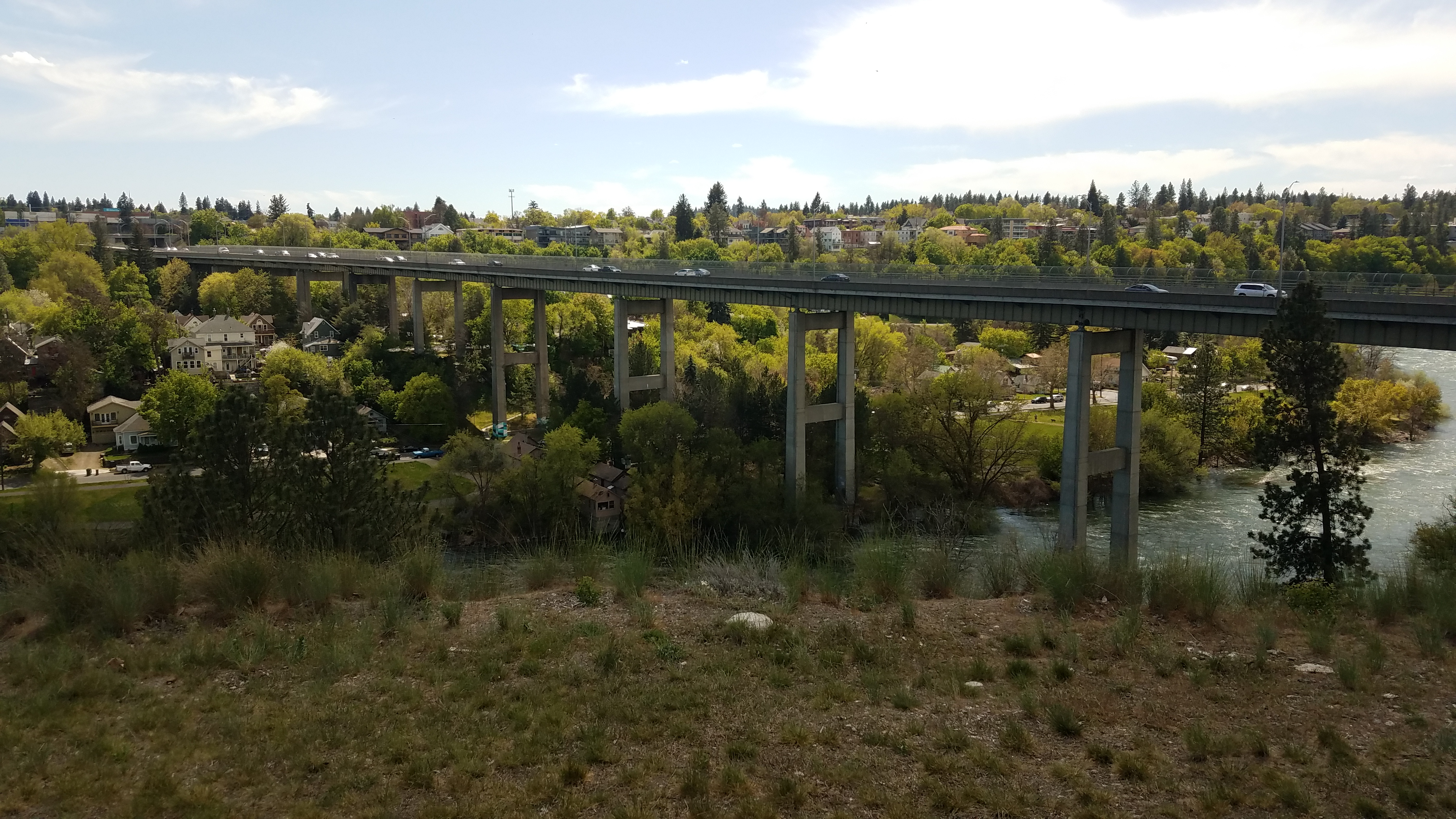
The Peaceful Valley Historic District and Maple Street Bridge as seen from across the river looking east (left) and west (right)

There are two public parks located in the historic district. Redband Park, formerly known as Glover Field, is located in the northeastern most corner of the district, and Peaceful Valley Park occupies the land directly underneath the Maple Street Bridge from Wilson Avenue in the south to the river in the north.

== History ==
What is now the Peaceful Valley Historic District was for centuries part of the traditional lands of the Spokane people. Its proximity to Spokane Falls made it an ideal location for salmon fishing for not only the Spokane but also other tribes from around the region.

The earliest white settlers in the area began to arrive after Spokane was incorporated in 1881. Originally a hard-scrabble neighborhood known as Poverty Flat, separated from the wealthy Browne's Addition and bustling central business district by the steep bluffs. Early maps of the city, such as one from 1884, depict no structures in the area, though it would become home to squatters and people living in simple shacks. An 1891 story in the Spokane Falls Review announced plans to clear squatters from the area:

The district immediately below the falls upon the south side of the river which has for some time been inhabited by families of very humble circumstances, is being rapidly cleared of its former denizens and their domiciles and restored to its primieval character. This work has been undertaken by Messrs. Cannon and Browne, proprietors of the tract, and by the City Board of Health.

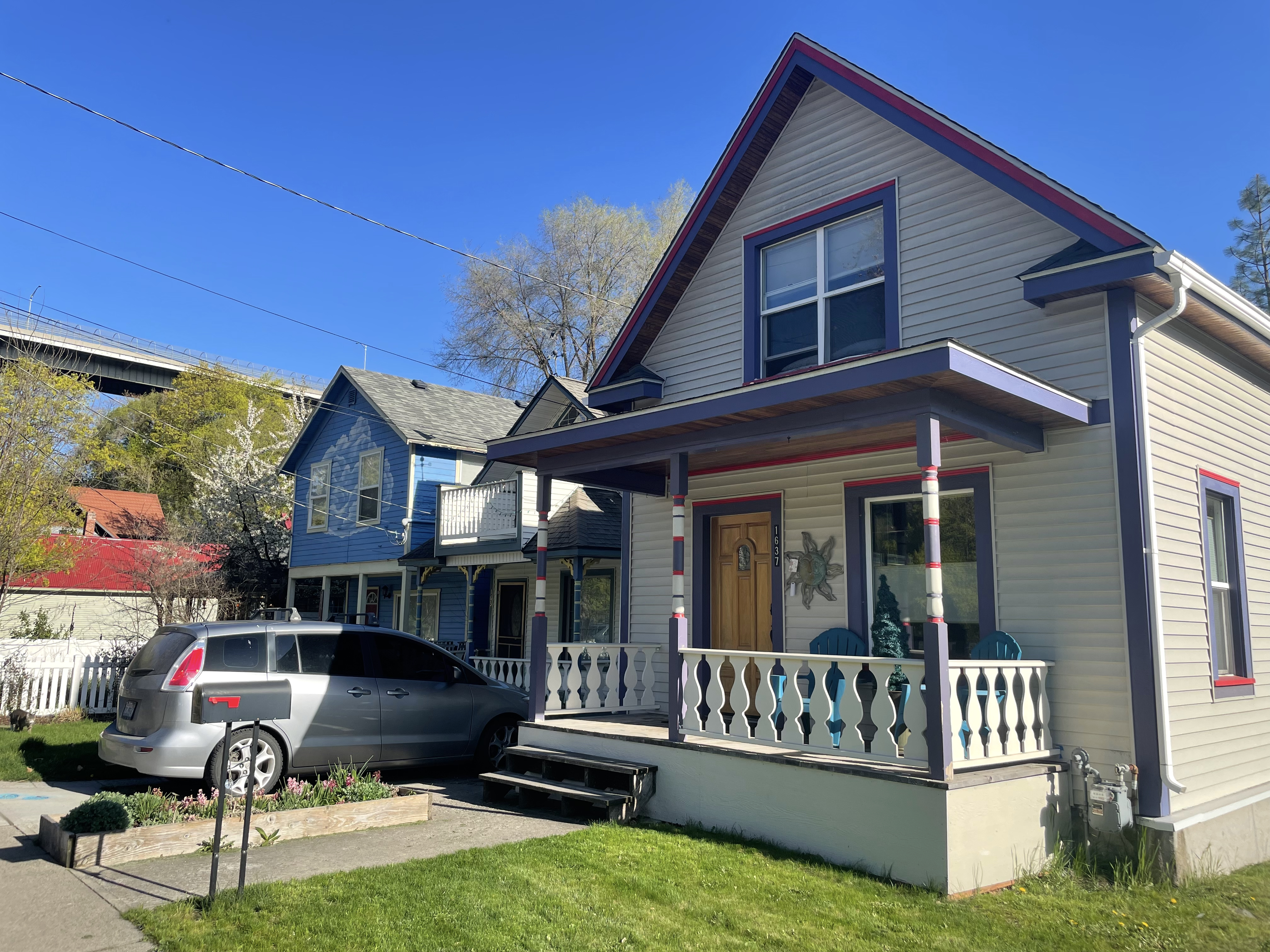
Tightly packed homes on thin lots

This action came after the neighborhood was platted in November 1890 and lots began to sell. Real estate developer C.F. Clough platted lots into 25-by-100 foot rectangles. Lots began to sell, but in order to accelerate development, Clough renamed the area Peaceful Valley to distance itself from the previous Poverty Flat moniker. The name was borrowed from an 1893 play of the same name by Edward E. Kidder. Despite the name change, development remained slow due to the Panic of 1893.

Development came to the neighborhood in earnest once the economy began to recover in the late 1890s. Many of the earliest residents of Peaceful Valley were immigrants from northern European countries drawn to Spokane for work as laborers. The city was undergoing a population boom and needed to rebuild from the Great Spokane Fire that destroyed the downtown area. The rebuild was necessitated by the booming population of the city, which allowed it to persist despite the financial crisis. This gave these laborers the means to eventually purchase lots and build in Peaceful Valley. These early residents were largely from Finland, Sweden and Germany. The Finns presence was especially felt in the early days due to the Finnish Social Hall built about a block west of the current district boundaries and the multiple saunas constructed around the district.

Construction took off around the turn of the century. By 1910, homes had been built upon most lots in the district. They were mostly simple, one-to-two story wooden homes. Other styles in the district were "row cabins" consisting of one-room dwellings connected to form a long building, meant for seasonal workers. There were also a few commercial buildings, notably the Spokane Casket Company between Water Avenue and the Spokane River in the northwest corner of the district. Other commercial businesses included grocers, butcheries, barbers, saloons and laundries, as the steep surrounding terrain isolated the neighborhood and necessitated having those services in the area. Connectivity with downtown improved in 1911 when Main Avenue was given a more moderate grade after construction of the Monroe Street Bridge.

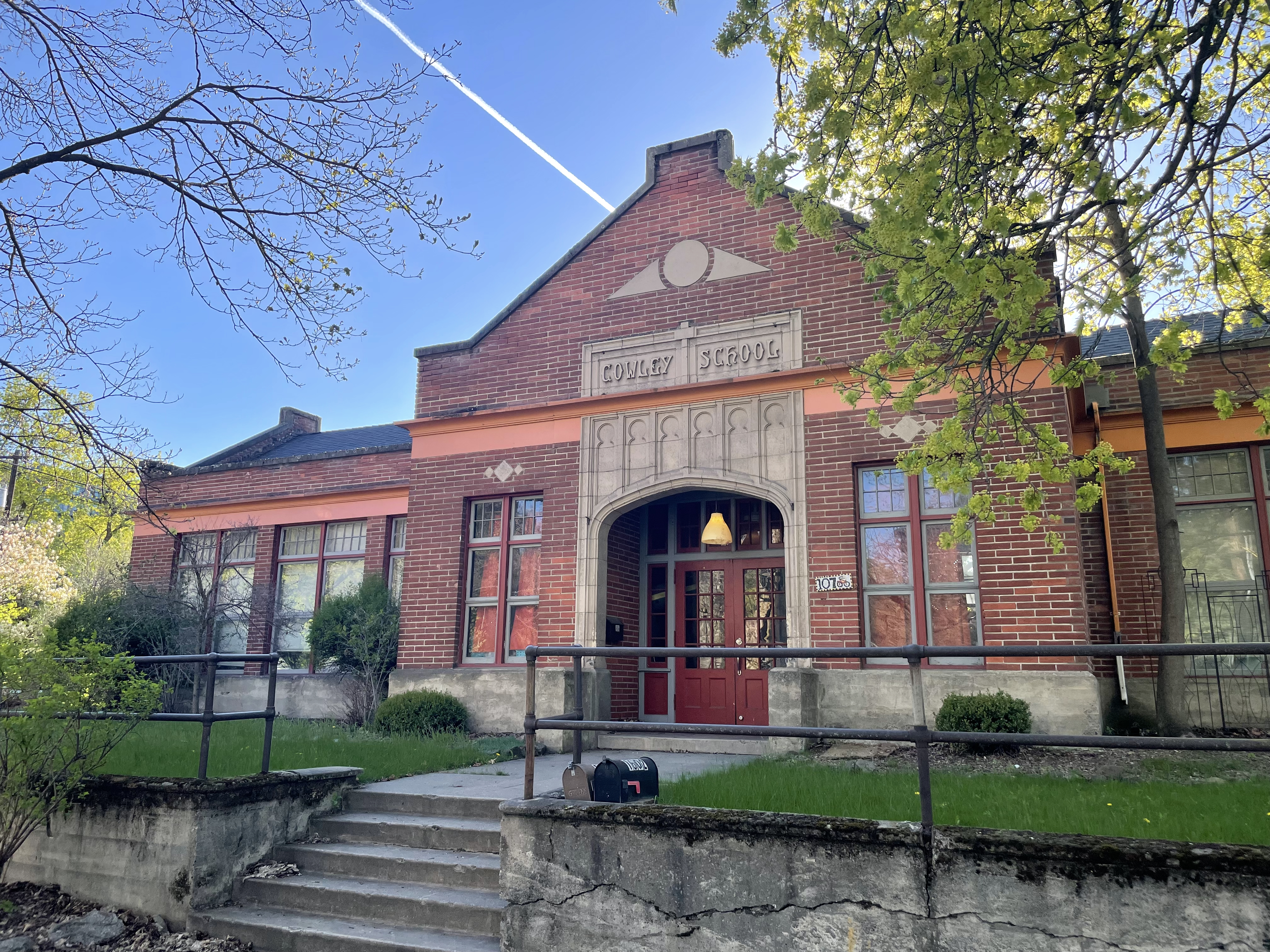
Cowley School

The isolating terrain necessitated a steep walk to and from school for neighborhood children, who were forced to walk up paths, and later stairs, to attend school in the Browne's Addition neighborhood above. Things began to change for the children in 1915 when residents, led by Mrs. George Holley, petitioned the school board to build a school in the area by claiming the arduous walk through snow and rain was a danger to the children's' health. Cowley School opened at Clarke and Maple in 1917 and would operate until 1930 when it closed due to lack of students.

Starting in 1912 when the city purchased the land, and continuing until 1925, Glover Field, now known as Redband Park, was home to a stadium that hosted sporting events, fairs and festivals. The stadium's bleachers were condemned in 1925, though the field would continue to serve its original purpose. In 1925 and 1926, the park hosted the National Indian Congress.

As original residents aged from the 1920s through the 1940s, the character of the neighborhood changed slightly. Some homes were converted into apartments, and an increasing population of widows began bringing in renters to help make ends meet. The Northern European ethnic influence began to wane in this period, and the Finnish Social Hall was demolished in 1942.

The greatest upheaval to the state of the neighborhood came in the 1950s with the arrival of the Maple Street Bridge. Construction of the support piers under the bridge necessitated the demolition of entire blocks of homes along Maple Street. Initially after the construction, the empty land below the bridge was left vacant and became an eyesore for the neighborhood where plants would not grow and trash accumulated. The land would eventually be converted into a park, though not until the mid-1980s.

While the neighborhood retained its working class character over the decades, in the 1960s and 1970s it also began to attract artists and Bohemian types attracted by the low rents and the history of maverick residents dating back to its early labor days. In 1972, a Spokane chapter of the Youth International Party was established with its headquarters in Peaceful Valley. By 1984, the area was listed on the National Register of Historic Places (NRHP).

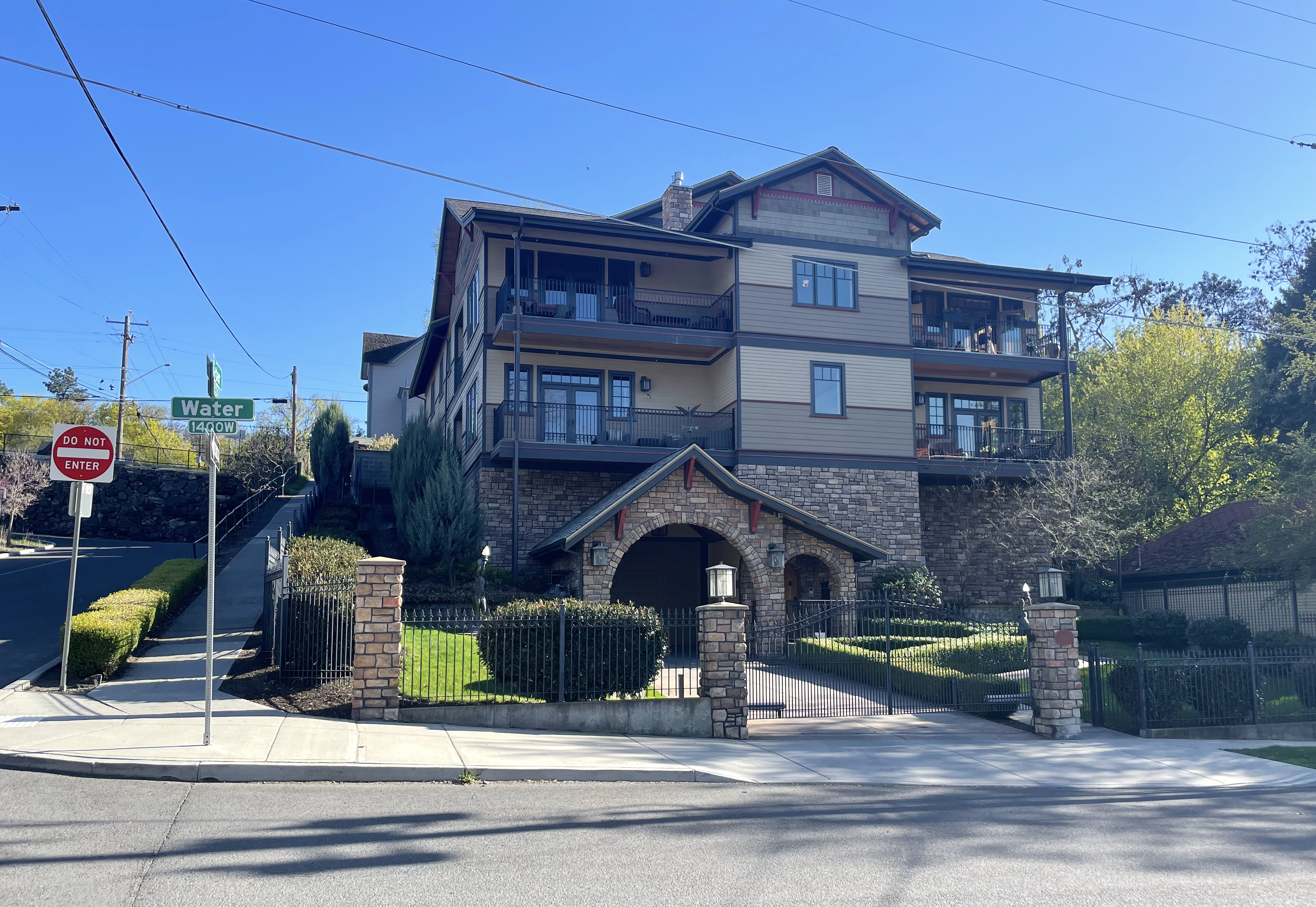
Modern incursion of a condominium constructed in 2007

In the years since its listing on the NRHP, the area has retained much of its original historical integrity and character, but continued changes have come as well. As Spokane saw its population begin to grow again during the latter years of the 20th century and into the first decades of the 21st century, development projects in Peaceful Valley have impacted the visual appearance of the neighborhood. The neighborhood was featured in the 1992 film Benny and Joon, specifically the house at 301 N. Cedar Street. Some newer apartments and condominiums have been built in the area, and the neighborhood has been under repeated threat from developers proposing larger-scale projects either within the district or on the hillside directly above, which has led to repeated pushback from residents of the community.

== Gallery ==
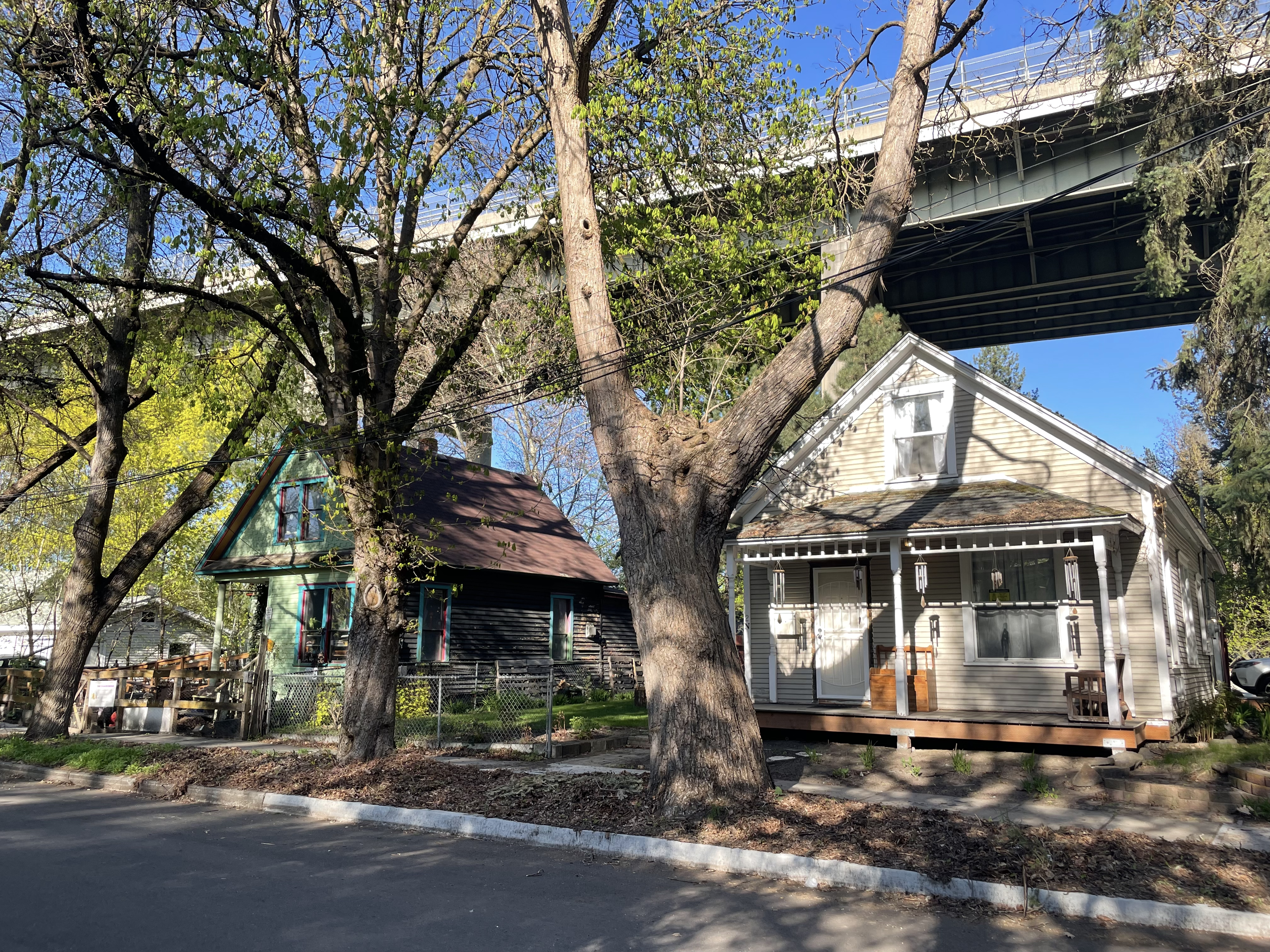
Historic homes with the Maple Street Bridge above

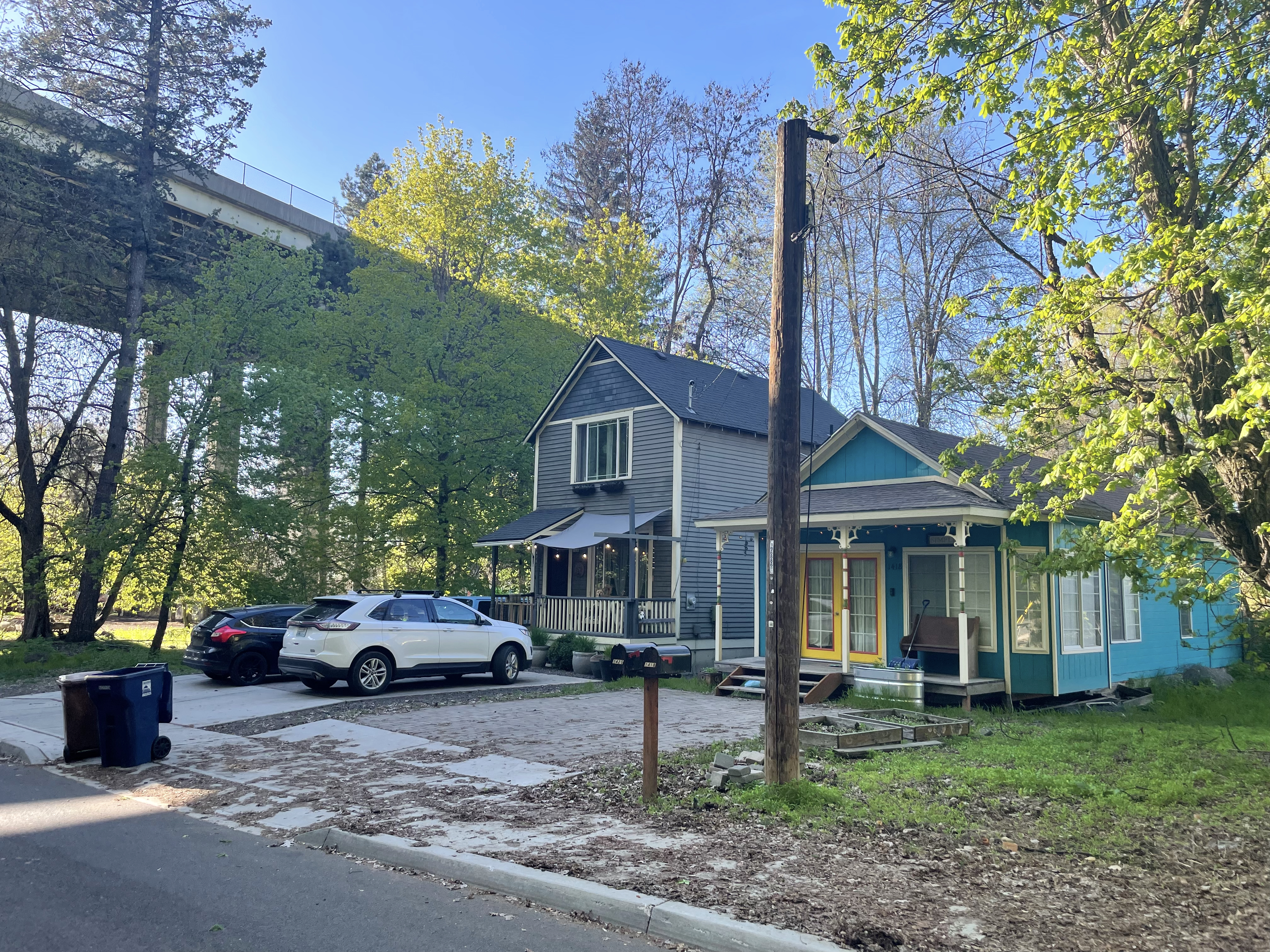
Historic homes in the shadow of the bridge

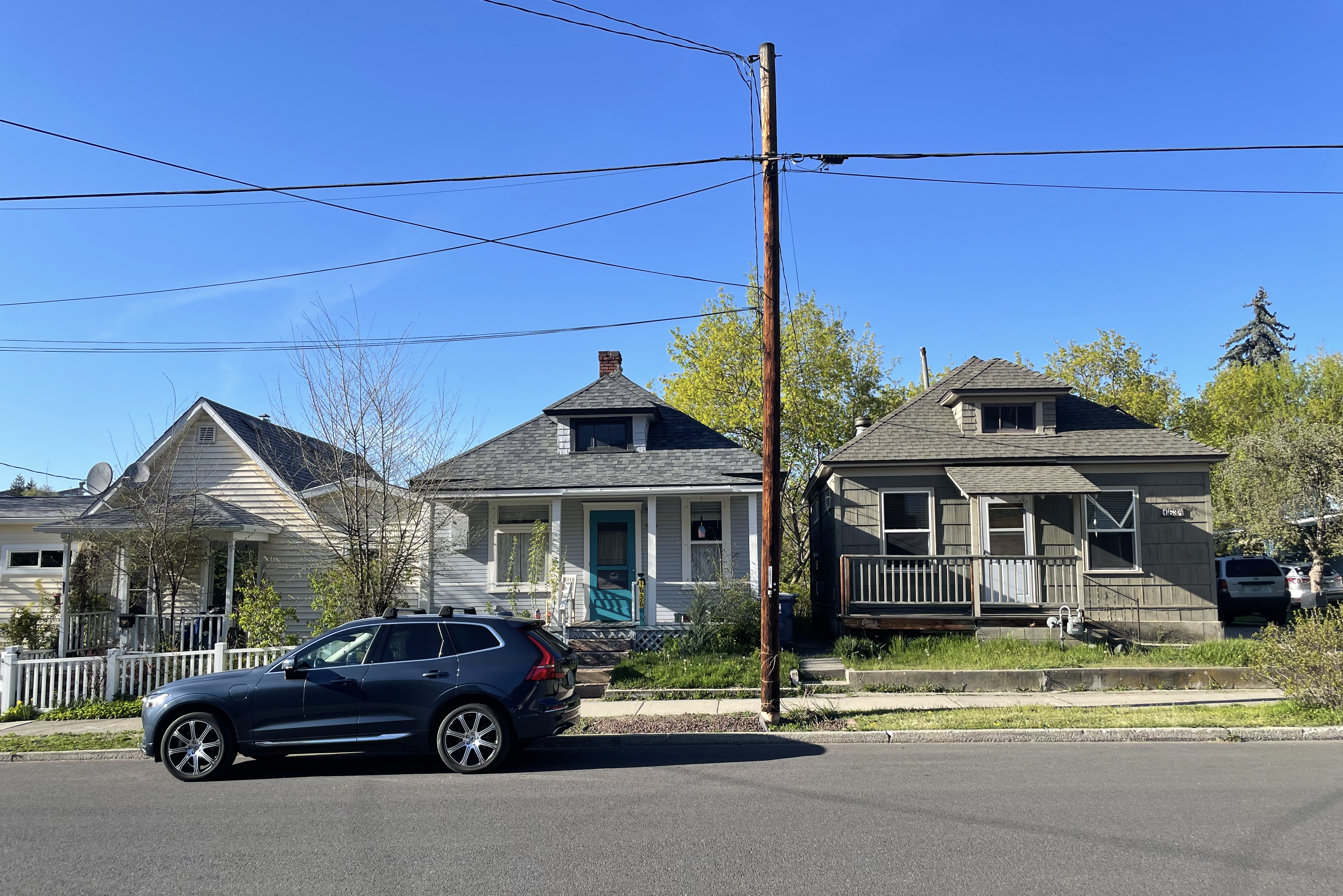
Homes typical of the district on Clarke Avenue

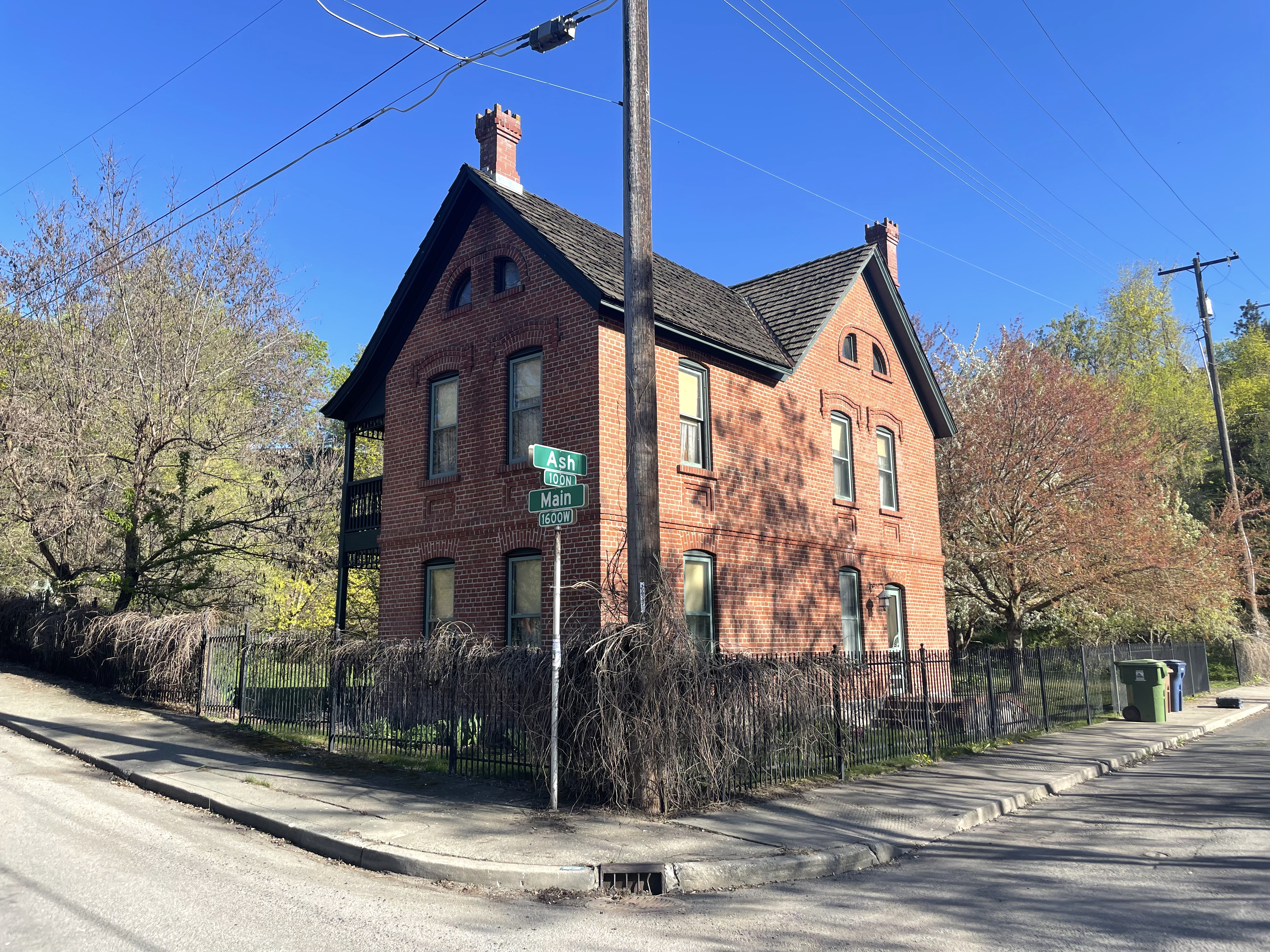
Rare home constructed of bricks in the district

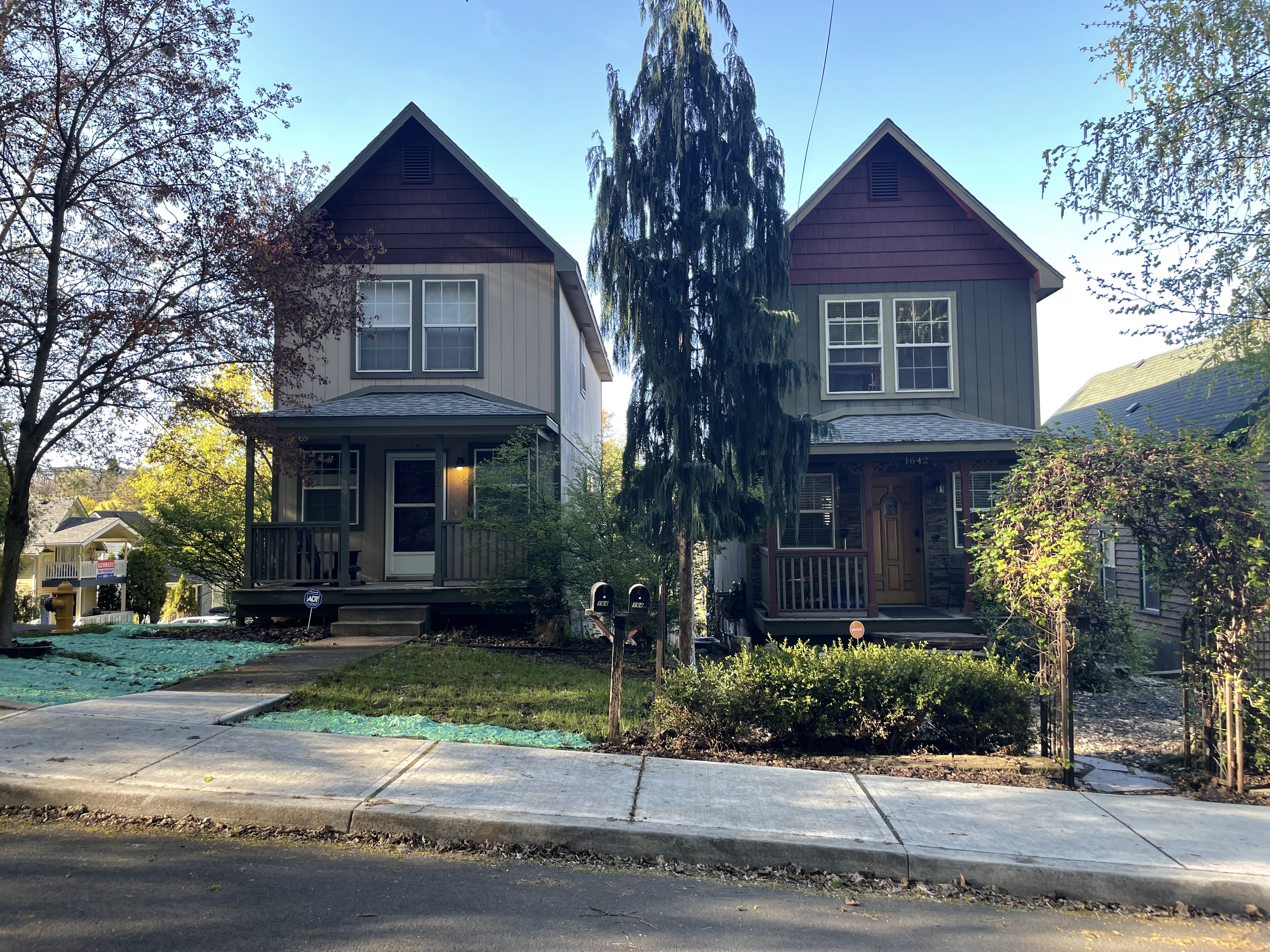
Non-historic homes on thin lots

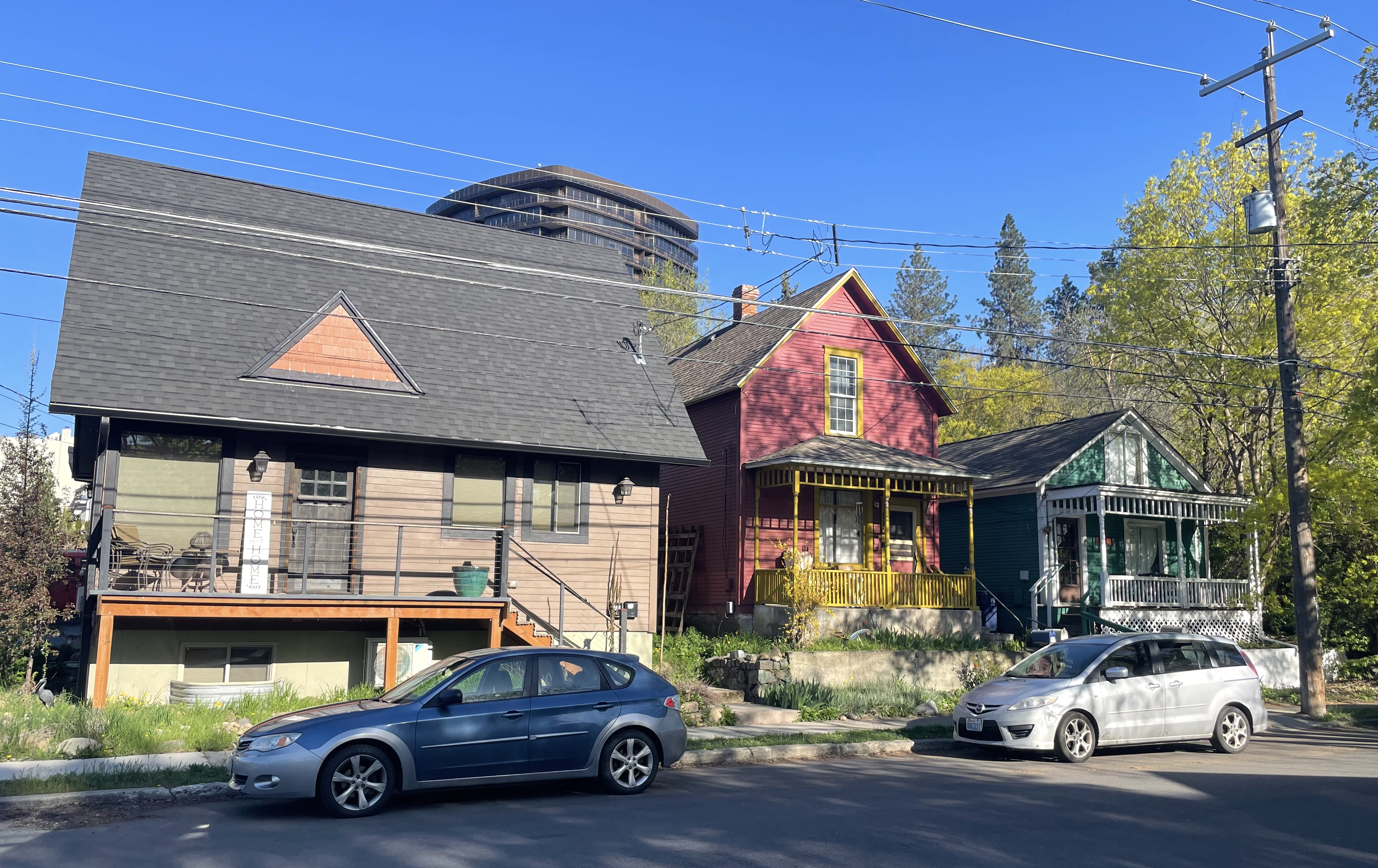
Historic homes showing proximity to Downtown

== See also ==
- Peaceful Valley, Spokane
- National Register of Historic Places listings in Spokane County, Washington
