= Peaceful Valley, Spokane =

Peaceful Valley
- Spokane Neighborhood
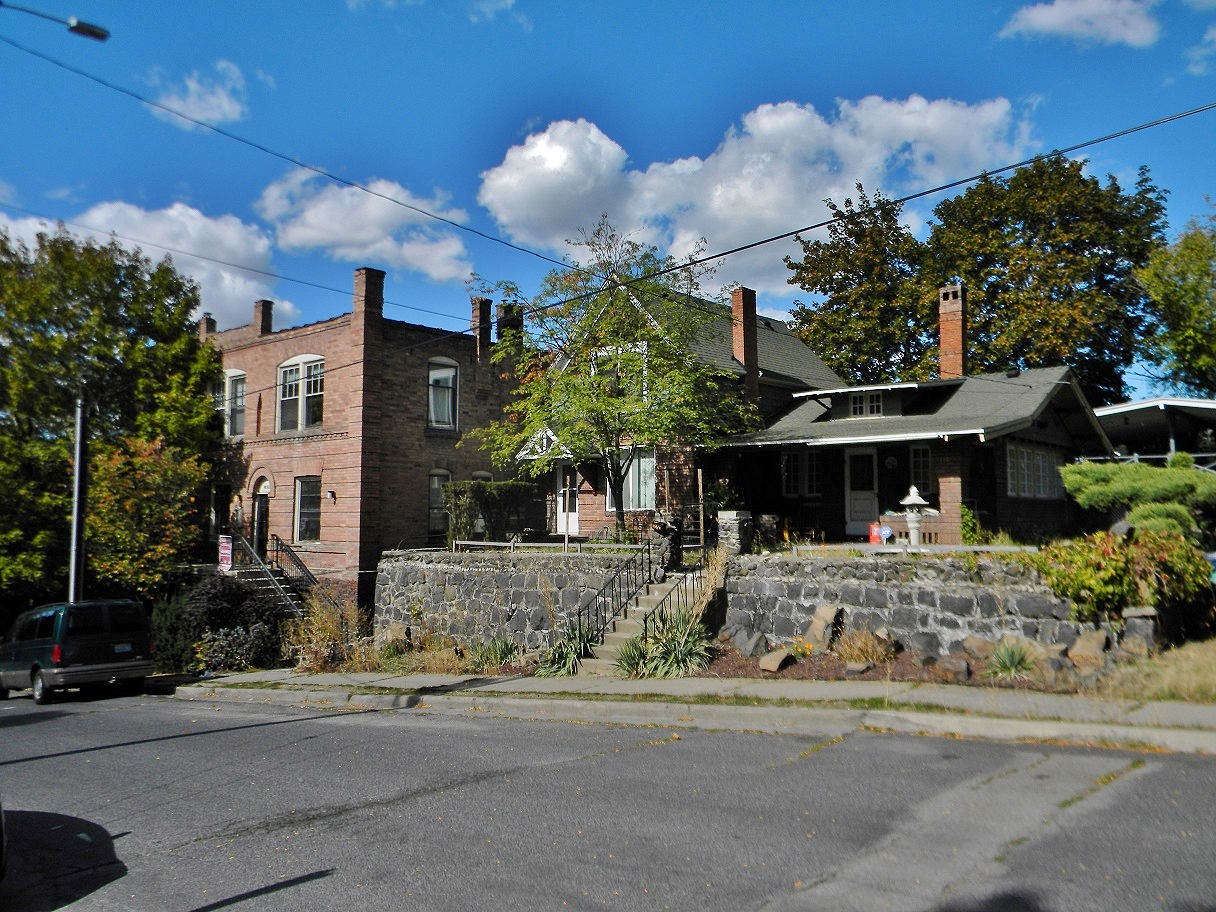
- Main Avenue at Maple Street

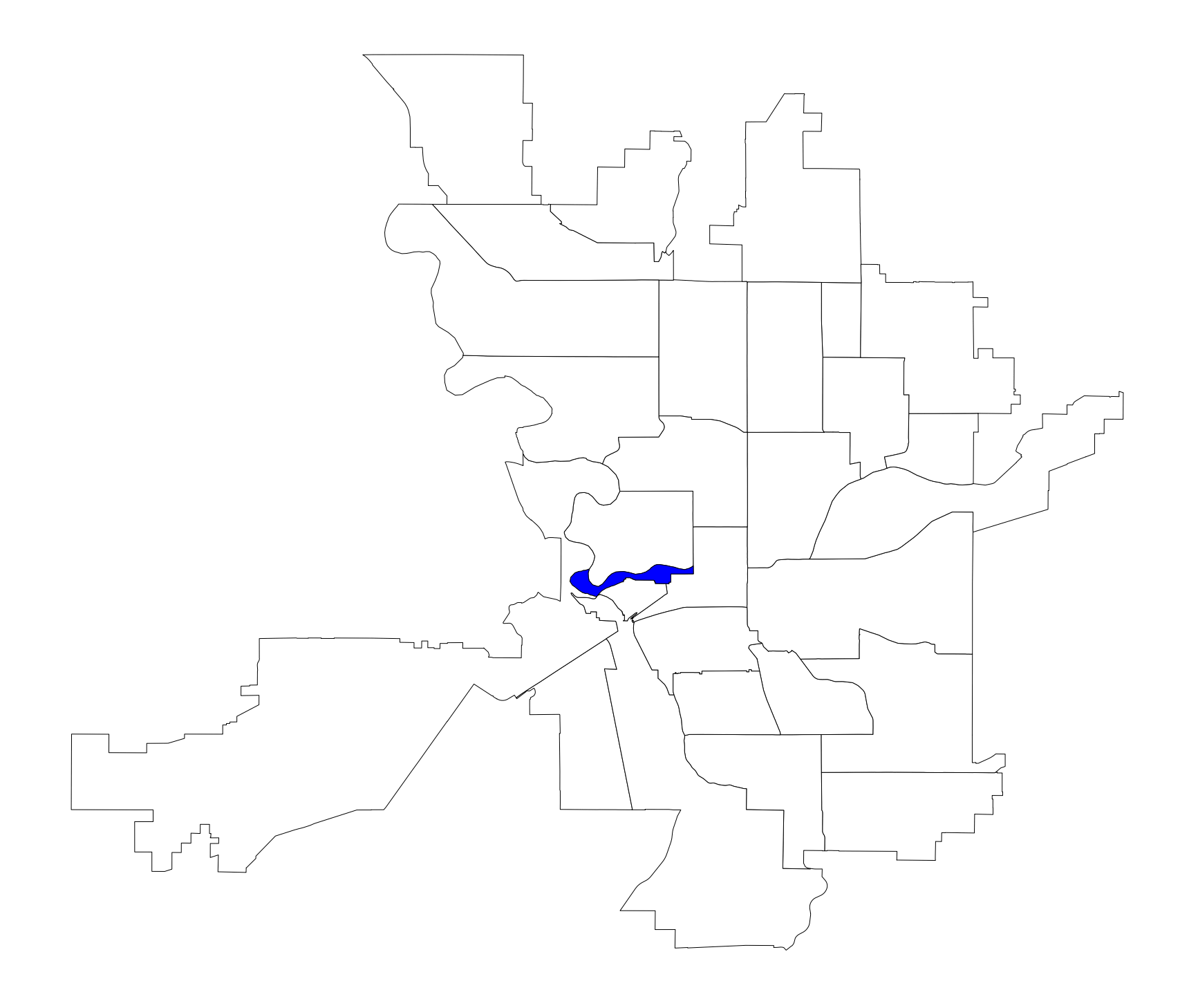
- Location within the city of Spokane
- Coordinates: 47°39′32.2″N 117°26′06.8″W
- Country: United States
- State: Washington
- County: Spokane
- City: Spokane

Population (2017)
  - Total: 278

Demographics 2017
  - White: 92%
  - Latinx: 2.7%
  - Black: 0.8%
  - American Indian and Alaska Native: 2%
- Time zone: UTC-8 (PST)
  - Summer (DST): UTC-7 (PDT)
- ZIP Codes: 99201
- Area code: 509

Peaceful Valley is a neighborhood in Spokane, Washington. It sits directly below Downtown Spokane on the Spokane River under its falls. The neighborhood snakes along the thin floodplain on the valley floor of the Spokane River Gorge. It is the smallest neighborhood in the city by both area and population, but due to its central location and unique character it is quite notable. The neighborhood has a working class and bohemian culture.

Much of the eastern half of the neighborhood, surrounding the intersection of Main Avenue and Maple Street, is listed on the National Register of Historic Places as the Peaceful Valley Historic District as one of the few surviving examples of turn-of-the-century working-class residential districts in the state of Washington.

== Geography ==
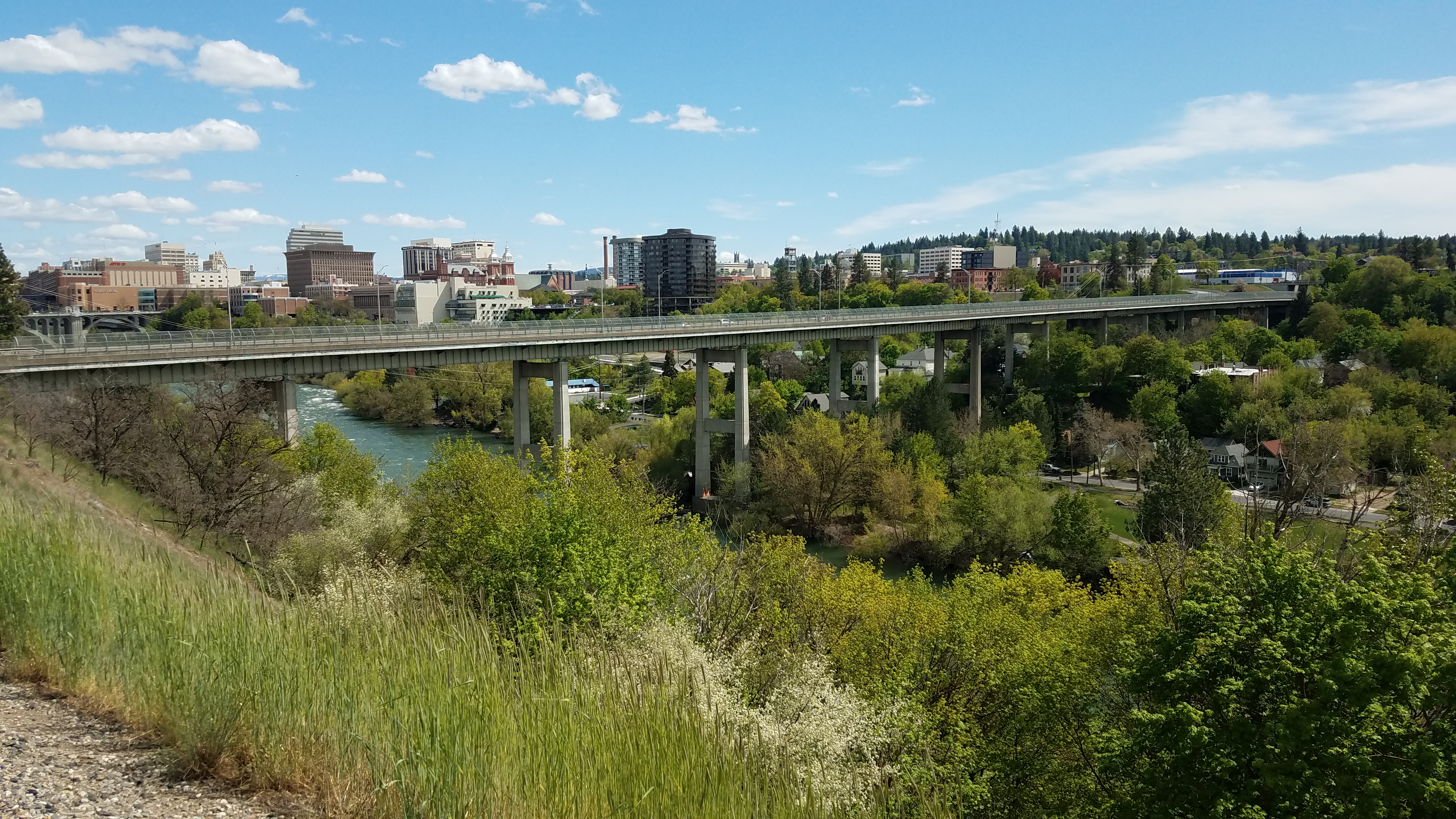
The Maple Street Bridge with Downtown Spokane in the background and Peaceful Valley in the right foreground

Located at the bottom of the Spokane River Gorge, immediately downstream of the Spokane Falls and Downtown Spokane, Peaceful Valley lies along the valley of the Spokane River. The neighborhood stretches for one-and-a-quarter miles from Monroe Street at the Monroe Street Bridge on the east, where it meets Downtown Spokane at the top of the Main Avenue hill, to the final bend of Latah Creek on the west. The Spokane River bounds the neighborhood on the north and the top of the steep slope on the south side of the gorge marks the southern edge where the neighborhood meets Browne's Addition. At three points along the length of Peaceful Valley, the extent of flat land is less than 100 feet wide. In the western end of the neighborhood the terrain opens up considerably as Latah Creek joins into the Spokane River. The valley widens as those two streams come together. It is the site of People's Park, which occupies the peninsula between Latah Creek and the Spokane River.

Lots in the neighborhood were platted thin by Spokane standards, at 25 feet by 100 feet.

== History ==
For thousands of years, the Spokane people have lived at the site now known as Peaceful Valley. Fishing camps were established on the banks of the river to take advantage of the great salmon runs in the area. One camp was located on the eastern edge of the present neighborhood, just underneath the Spokane Falls, and another was on the western end where Latah Creek joins the Spokane River. The area was so rich in fish that it was a gathering place for multiple tribes from around the region. Tribes continued to maintain their summer fishing camps in the area even after the City of Spokane was settled by European Americans. The salmon runs were cut off with the construction of Long Lake Dam downstream in 1915.

In the early days of white settlement in Spokane, Peaceful Valley was known as Poverty Flats. Shacks housing squatters and transients began popping up there in the 1880s, before being cleared out by landowners in 1891. Also in 1891, the oldest standing single-family home in Peaceful Valley, the Pietsch House, was built at Ash and Main. Two years after clearing the squatters, real estate developer C. F. Clough platted the neighborhood and began selling lots. To aid in his endeavor, Clough changed the name of the area from Poverty Flats to Peaceful Valley. Development was stalled by the Panic of 1893, and it took until the turn of the century for construction efforts to take off in Peaceful Valley. The oldest standing single-family home in Peaceful Valley, the Pietsch House, was built in 1891.

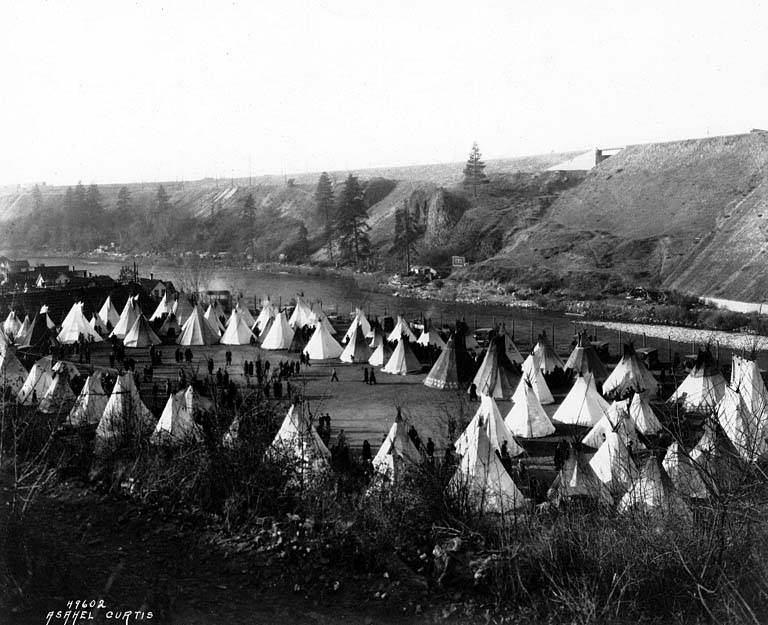
Northwest Indian Congress at Glover Field in 1925

By 1910 the neighborhood had been filled in, with houses on nearly every lot. They were small, simple homes, one or two stories tall and long and thin due to the size of the lots that had been platted. Between 40 and 50 of the early dwellings were shotgun homes. Early commercial buildings in the neighborhood included the Spokane Casket Company, built in 1901, which operated for nearly 100 years. Other commercial endeavors such as grocery stores, butchers, saloons and laundromats existed in the community, though now all are gone.

Access to the neighborhood was difficult due to the surrounding terrain, but became easier in when the Monroe Street Bridge was constructed in 1911. Main Avenue, which intersects with Monroe Street immediately south of the bridge span, was regraded to the west of the bridge as it descended from Downtown Spokane into Peaceful Valley. The hill was steep, but much more passable for contemporary vehicles. In the western and more isolated end of the neighborhood, known as Bennett's Addition, roads were nothing more than dirt trails into the 1930s.

The neighborhood's first park was developed in 1912 just west of the Monroe Street Bridge. Glover Field, named for Spokane's founding father, James N. Glover, was home to a running track and football field with a capacity for 10,000 spectators. It was the site of 88 teepees set up during the Northwest Indian Congress held in October and November 1925. A recreation center was established at the park in 1949. The structure was an existing barrack transported from Geiger Field that had a precipitous journey down the hill into Peaceful Valley. The recreation center has been transformed today into the Peaceful Valley Community Center.

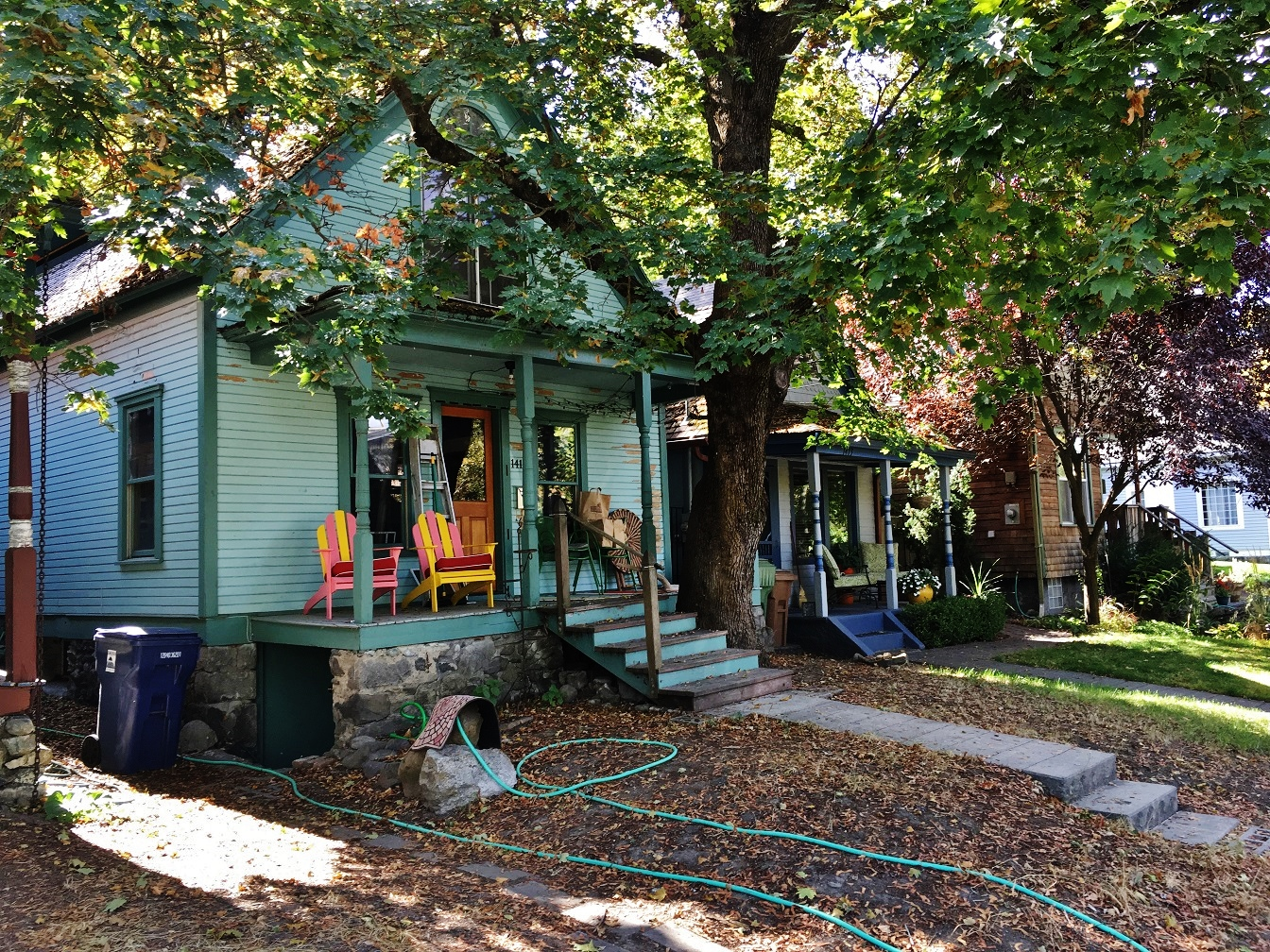
As a rare and largely intact example of an early 20th century working-class neighborhood, the Peaceful Valley Historic District is listed on the NRHP

A school was built in 1917 after neighborhood mothers, supported by local newspapers, appealed to the school district over the difficulty young children had climbing the steep wooden staircase to get out of the valley and up to the school in Browne's Addition. The two-room Cowley School served the first and second grades only, as older children were deemed capable of climbing the stairs. Spokane had an expansive streetcar network at the time, but streetcar lines were never laid in the neighborhood, necessitating foot travel in Peaceful Valley more than other areas of the city.

The most dramatic change in the neighborhood occurred in 1957 when the Maple Street Bridge was built over the Spokane River and a large swath of Peaceful Valley. Much of the length of the 1,719 foot long bridge passes above not the river, but the neighborhood itself. Many homes were demolished to make way for the bridge's pillars. Initially left barren, the empty space directly underneath the bridge became a source of blight within the neighborhood. There have been attempts to beautify the area, which is now home to basketball and futsal courts and murals.

Peaceful Valley received national attention when the 1993 film Benny & Joon was shot and set in the neighborhood, with a house located at 301 N. Cedar Street serving as the setting for the shared home of the title characters. A review published in The Washington Post referred to the setting as "a fairy tale section" of Spokane.

== Demographics ==
As of 2017, Peaceful Valley is home to 278 people across 163 households. 67.8% of those households are rentals, compared to just 45.3% citywide. 10.6% of residents are 65 years old or above while 8.2% are 19 years old or younger. The median household income is $34,618, compared to $44,768 citywide. 6.9% of the population is unemployed, compared to 6.5% citywide. 51.4% of residents have a bachelor's degree or higher while 9.5% have only a high school diploma. 94.3% of residents were born in the United States or its territories. Of those who weren't, 27.7% are from Japan, 23.7% from Ethiopia, 11.4% from Vietnam and 7.9% from Norway.

In the first half of the 20th century, the neighborhood was home to many immigrant communities. There was a notably large population of Finns.

== Education ==
Peaceful Valley is served by Spokane Public Schools, though there are no schools located within the neighborhood. Peaceful Valley is part of the Roosevelt Elementary district, located in the Cliff/Cannon neighborhood. Roosevelt feeds into Sacajawea Middle School, in the Comstock neighborhood before feeding into Lewis and Clark High School in Cliff/Cannon.

== Transportation ==
=== Surface Streets ===
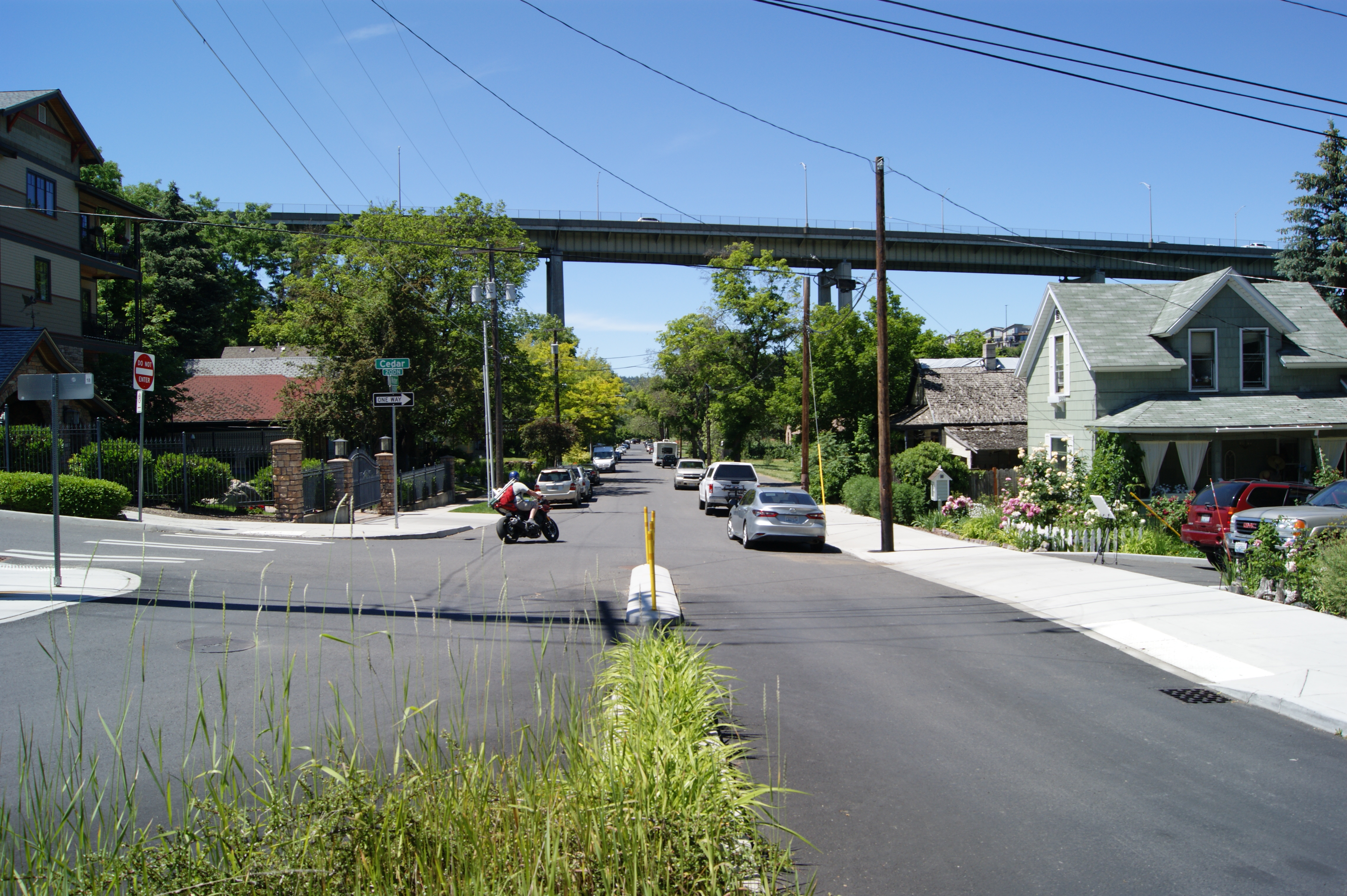
Water Street and the Benny & Joon House on the right

There are just two surface road connections between Peaceful Valley and the rest of the city of Spokane. On the east at Main Avenue entering downtown and on the west where Clarke Avenue meets Riverside Avenue. None of the neighborhood's streets are considered arterials of any class.

For cyclists and pedestrians there is a shared use path running along the river from Glover Field to People's Park, where it connects to the Spokane River Centennial Trail on the other side of the river via the Sandifur Memorial Bridge. The city is moving forward with a 2021 proposal that would connect the Peaceful Valley path from People's Park to the Fish Lake Trail which heads south. There are two public staircases that connect Peaceful Valley with the land directly above. One is located at the intersection of Cedar and Wilson and rises to reach the intersection of Cedar, Riverside and Sprague on the western edge of downtown. These stairs were rebuilt in 2018. The other, the only wooden staircase the city maintains, is located on the other end of the neighborhood at Spruce Street where it climbs to Riverside Avenue in Browne's Addition at the Northwest Museum of Arts and Culture. It is believed to be the oldest location of a staircase in the city, perhaps dating back over 130 years.

=== Public Transit ===
Public transportation is provided by the Spokane Transit Authority, which serves Peaceful Valley with one fixed route bus line.

Route	Termini			Service operation and notes	Streets traveled
20C; SFCC	Downtown Spokane; STA Plaza	↔	West Hills; Spokane Falls Community College	High-frequency route	Main, Maple, Clarke, Riverside
