= Maple Street Bridge (Spokane, Washington) =

Bridge in Spokane, Washington, U.S.

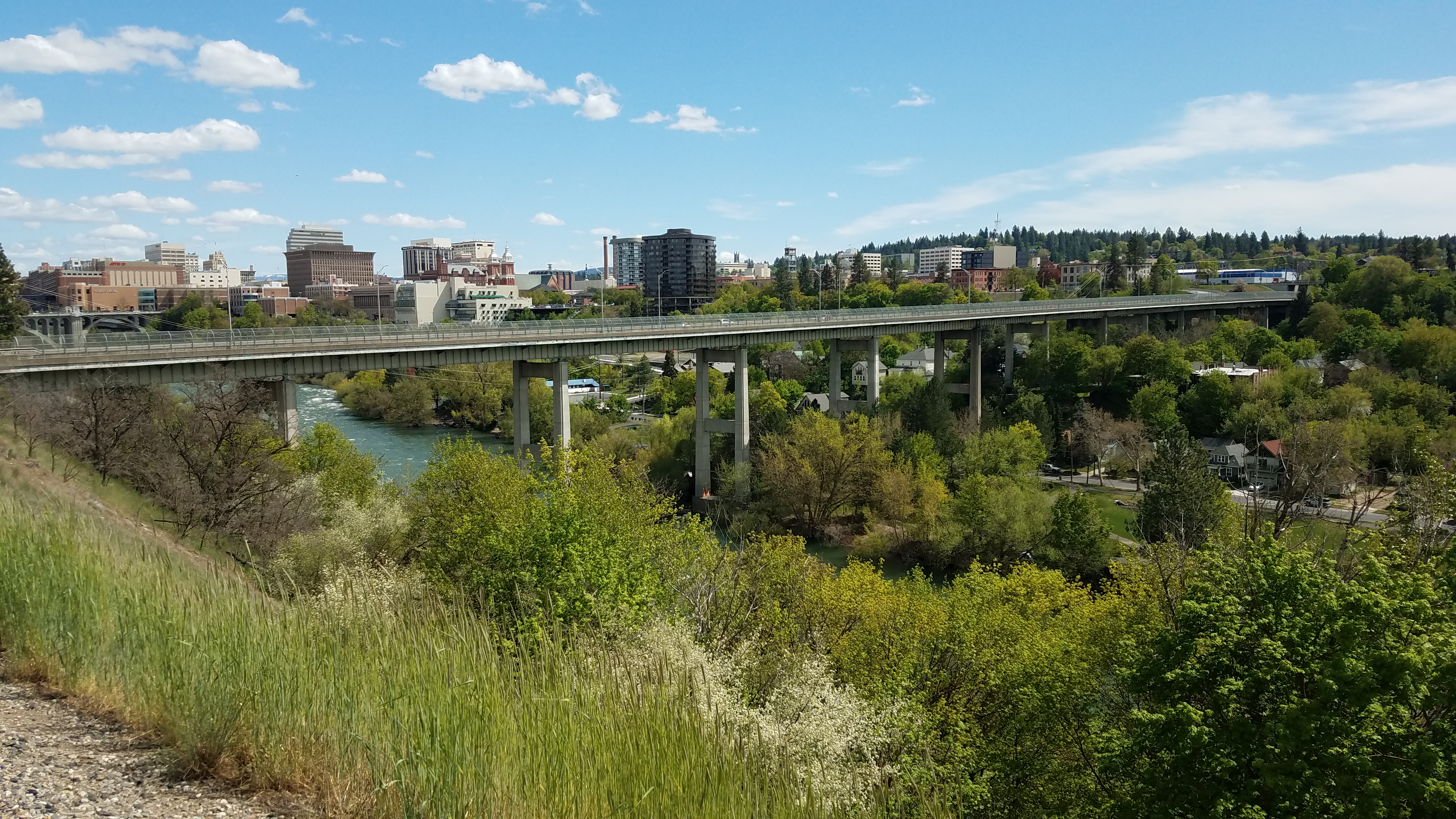
- View from northwest at Kendall Yards in 2020
- Coordinates: 47°39′34″N 117°26′05″W
- Carries: Maple Street
- Crosses: Spokane River and Peaceful Valley
- Locale: Spokane, Washington U.S.
- Other name(s): Maple Street Toll Bridge (1958–1990)
- Named for: Maple Street
- Owner: City of Spokane Department of Streets

Characteristics
- Design: Girder bridge
- Total length: 1,708 feet (521 m)
- Height: 125 feet (38 m)
- No. of lanes: 4

History
- Construction start: 1956
- Construction cost: $6 million (1956) ($71.1 million in 2025)
- Opened: July 1, 1958; 68 years ago

Statistics
- Daily traffic: 40,600 (2015)
- Toll: $0.10 (1958–1981) $0.25 (1981–1990); Toll removed in 1990

Location
- Interactive map of Maple Street Bridge

The Maple Street Bridge is a girder bridge in the northwest United States in Spokane, Washington. It spans West Central to Downtown, crossing over the Spokane River and the Peaceful Valley neighborhood. Along with the Division Street Bridge and Monroe Street Bridge, the Maple Street Bridge is one of several major bridges that cross the Spokane River.

The bridge is 1,719 feet (524 m) in length, stands 125 feet (38 m) above the river, with a deck that is fifty feet (15 m) wide. It has two-lane traffic in both directions, and a caged pedestrian walkway. As of 2015, the Maple Street Bridge has an average daily traffic of 40,600 vehicles.

== History ==
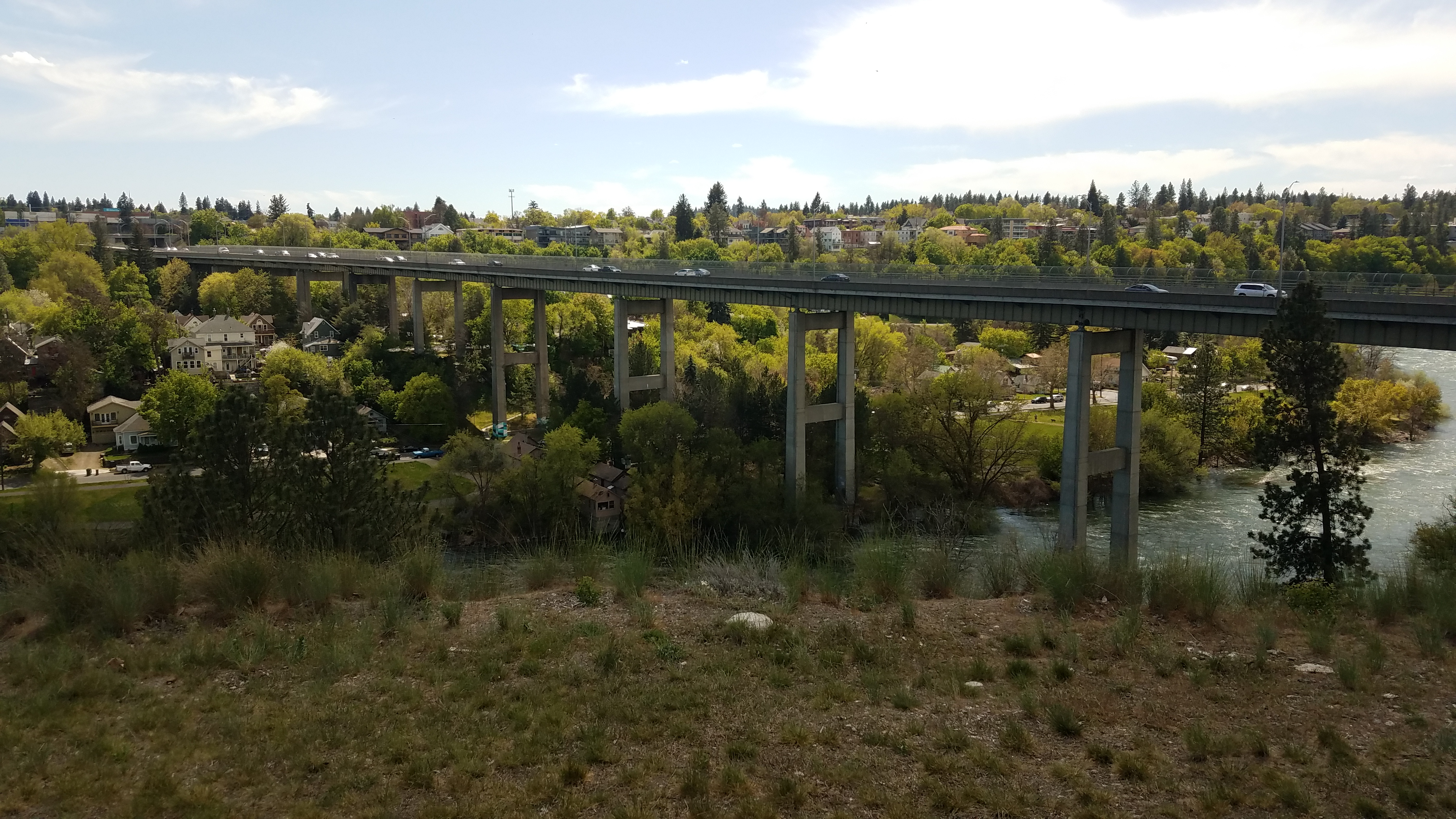
View from northeast in 2020

Construction began in 1956 and the Maple Street Bridge opened on July 1, 1958. The bridge cost $6 million dollars to construct, and required a ten-cent toll on vehicles from 1958 to 1981. During the first three hours, over 1,600 vehicles crossed the new bridge. The price was raised to 25 cents from 1981 to 1990, when the toll was removed.

== Accidents ==
During construction in December 1957, an iron worker was killed when he fell ninety feet (27 m) from a wooden platform.

In 2008, a teen died by accidentally falling from the Maple Street Bridge.

== See also ==
List of crossings of the Spokane River
