= P. C. Shine =

American politician

P.C. Shine
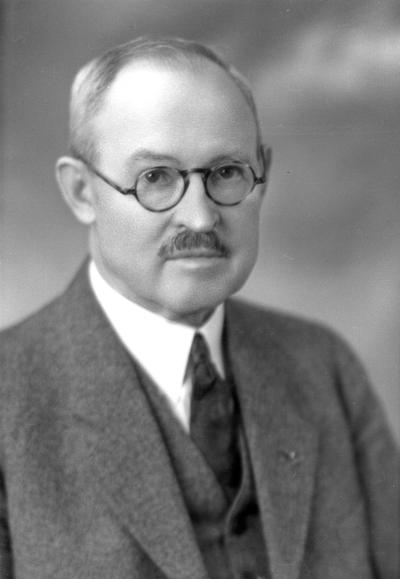
- Shine in 1933

Member of the Washington House of Representatives for the 3rd district
- In office 1933–1934

Personal details
- Born: December 25, 1863 County Limerick, Ireland
- Died: December 8, 1934 (aged 70) Spokane, Washington, United States
- Party: Democratic

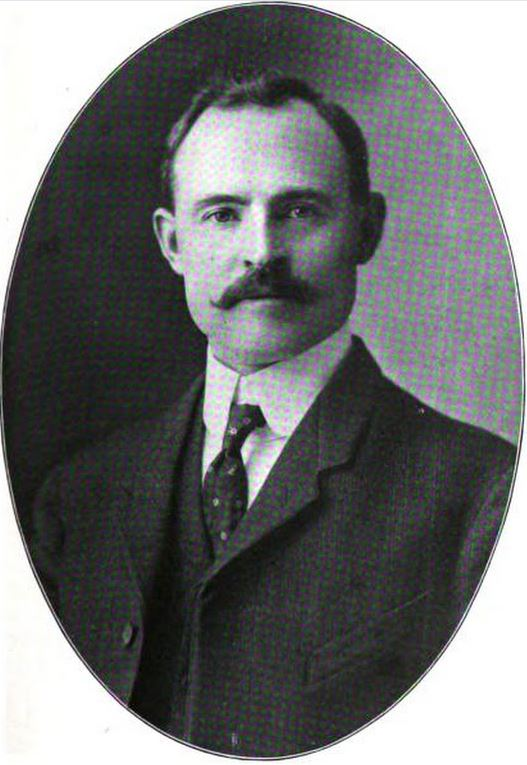
Patrick C. Shine, Photo from biographies of prominent citizens of the City of Spokane Washington.

Patrick C. Shine (December 25, 1863 – December 8, 1934) was an American politician in the state of Washington. He served in the Washington House of Representatives.

== 1912 biography by Nelson Wayne Durham ==
A remarkably successful career has been that of Patrick C. Shine since he entered upon the practice of law as a member of the Spokane bar. He was born in County Limerick, Ireland, on December 25, 1863. His parents were Michael and Ellen (Conners) Shine, who sent their son to the hedge school of the locality, subsequently to the National village school at Athea, and finally he completed his education at the College and Civil Service Academy of Limerick city. He was a bookkeeper for J. P. Newsom & Company of Limerick for three years thereafter.

He was one of a large family and in 1885, he came to America joining his brothers and father in Kansas City, Missouri, where he worked for a time as a streetcar conductor for the Metropolitan Street Railway Company. He next entered the employ of the Union Pacific Railroad, and in 1887-8, filled the office of deputy county collector of Jackson county, Missouri. Ambitious to have broader opportunities in other fields, he took up the study of law during that period, devoting all of his leisure hours to the mastery of the principles of jurisprudence. On leaving the office of deputy county collector of Jackson county, he returned to the Union Pacific Railway as statistic clerk and assistant cashier at Kansas City and from that point was transferred to Huntington, Oregon, as a cashier for the joint agency of the Oregon Short Line and Oregon Railroad & Navigation Company. Subsequently, he filled various positions with the latter company in all its departments. In 1894 he came to Spokane where he was employed by the Union Depot Company.

Mr. Shine had no sooner become a resident of this city than he severed his residence relations with Kansas City which he always theretofore claimed as his home. Edwin McNeill, then president of the Iowa Central Railway, offered him a responsible position with that road, but Mr. Shine refused to leave the west and continued in his less lucrative position at Spokane. Edwin McNeill, who was then prospective reorganizer of the Union Pacific system with headquarters at Portland, promised him the position of superintendent of a prospective division between Spokane, Washington, and La Grande, Oregon. Meantime by and with the encouragement of the superintendent of the Union Depot, Mr. Shine became a member of the American Railway Union, and was promptly elected its secretary and treasurer.

This affiliation changed his course completely and forced him into politics which became the stepping stone to his chosen profession. He was a cashier and chief deputy county treasurer under George Mudgett for two consecutive terms. After he had successfully passed the required examination for admission to the bar, in January of 1899, he was appointed local counsel for his old employer, the Oregon Railroad & Navigation Company. Later, at the instance of the legatees of the McNeill estate, he was appointed administrator with will annexed of the estate of Edwin McNeill, who died in New York. Other interests connected with his now extensive clientele have made him an official of various real-estate holding corporations. He has served as British Columbia Commissioner for the past ten years. He was always active in politics and was chairman of the Peoples' Party central committee, chairman of the executive committee of the Fusion Party, composed of populists, democrats and silver republicans, in 1896, when John R. Rogers was elected governor of the state of Washington. Since then he has been mentioned for various appointive political positions, but he has never accepted one. At the present time he is not affiliated with any political organization, although he keeps well informed on the questions and issues of the day and advocates such measures and principles as he believes will prove helpful in the municipal and general government.

On March 15, 1904, Mr. Shine was married, at San Francisco, California, to Miss Mary Louise Gomm, a native of Savannah, Georgia, and they now have two children, Patrick and Mary. Mr. Shine belongs to the Spokane Club and is a life member of the Spokane Amateur Athletic Club. He believes that trusts and labor organizations are fundamentally the same in principle and that both should be controlled by federal regulations. He has the social qualities, the ready wit and attractive personality, characteristic of the people of the Emerald Isle, combined with the ambition and enterprise so common in the west, and these qualities have made him popular as a man and successful as a lawyer.
