= Monroe Street Bridge (Spokane, Washington) =

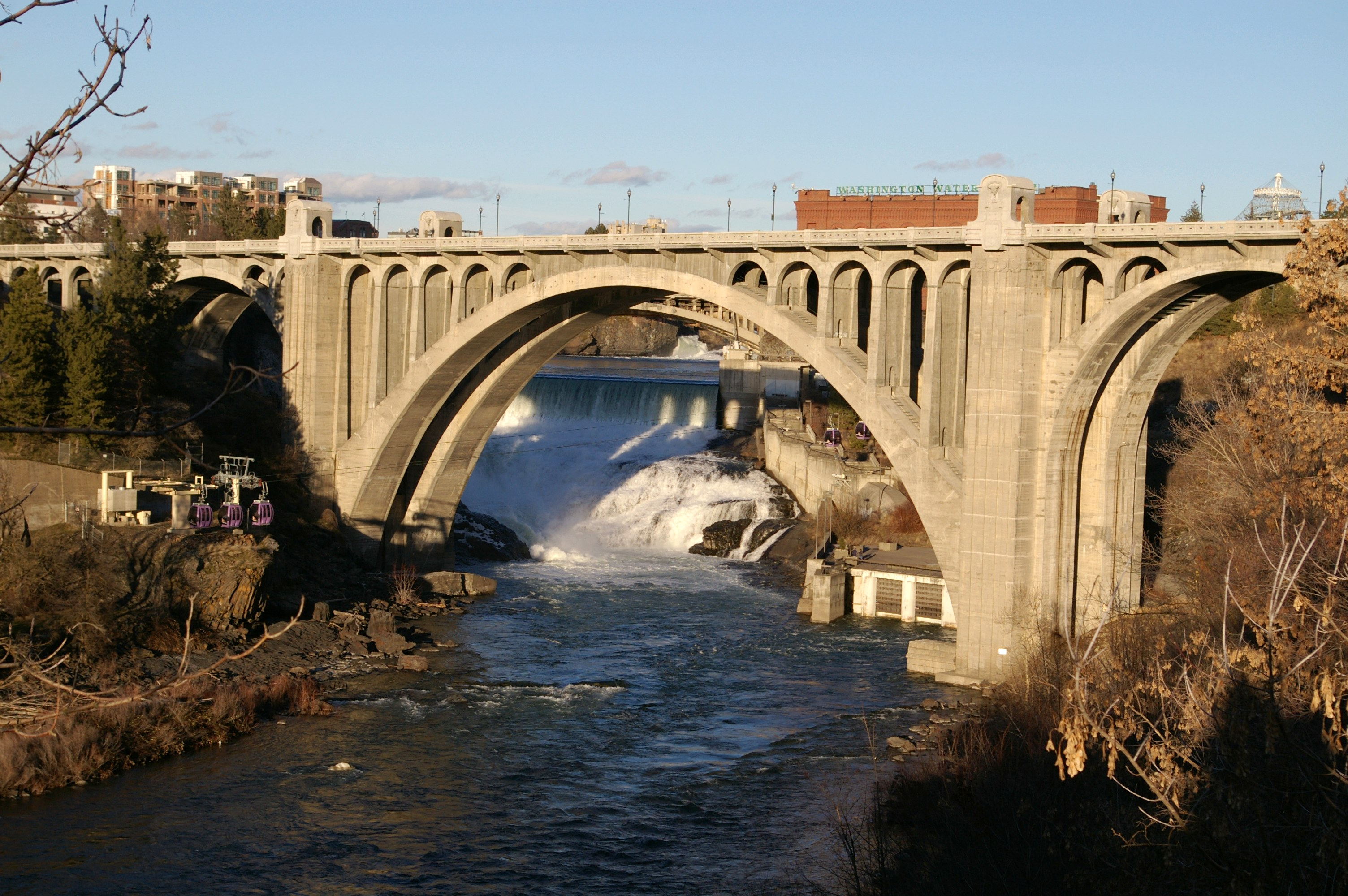
- View from southwest in 2007
- Coordinates: 47.6605°N 117.4267°W
- Crosses: Spokane River
- Locale: Spokane, Washington, U.S.
- Named for: President James Monroe (street)

Characteristics
- Design: Decked-arch bridge
- Material: Reinforced concrete
- Total length: 896 ft (273 m)
- Width: 50 ft (15 m) roadway with 9 ft (2.7 m) sidewalks
- Height: 136 ft (41.5 m)
- Longest span: 281 ft (85.6 m)

History
- Construction cost: $500,000 (1911) $18 million (2003–2005 restoration)
- Opened: November 23, 1911
- Rebuilt: 2003–2005

Statistics
- Monroe Street Bridge
- U.S. National Register of Historic Places
- Built: 1911
- Architect: Cutter & Malmgren
- MPS: Historic Bridges/Tunnels in Washington State TR (AD)
- NRHP reference No.: 76001920
- Added to NRHP: May 13, 1976

Location
- Interactive map of Monroe Street Bridge

The Monroe Street Bridge is a deck arch bridge in the northwestern United States that spans the Spokane River in Spokane, Washington. It was built 115 years ago in 1911 by the city of Spokane, and was designed by city engineer John Chester Ralston, assisted in construction supervision by Morton Macartney (and by assistant engineers J. F. Greene and P.F. Kennedy) with ornamentation provided by the firm of Kirtland Kelsey Cutter and Karl G. Malmgren as part of Cutter & Malmgren.

At completion, it was the largest concrete arch bridge in the U.S. and the third longest in the world. After more than ninety years of service, it was closed in January 2003 for restoration and reopened in September 2005.

== History ==
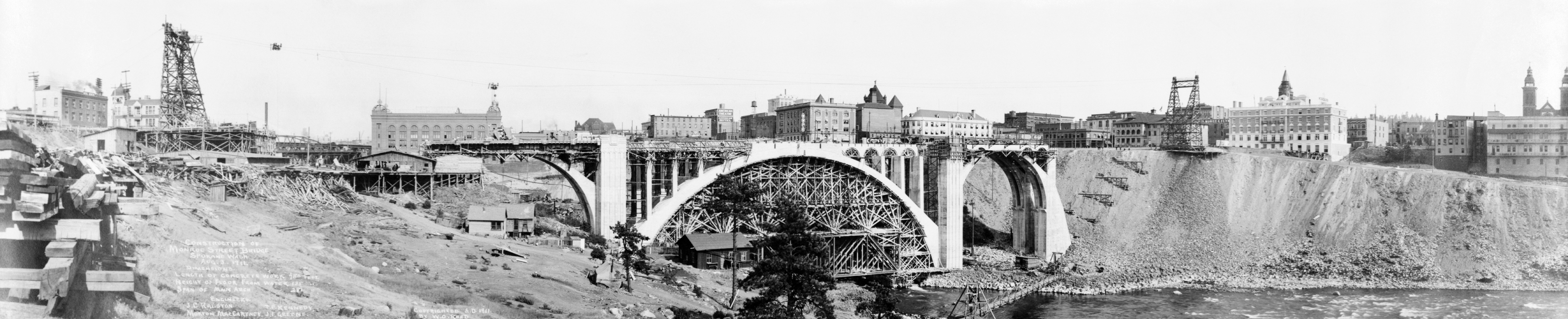
The third bridge under construction in 1911

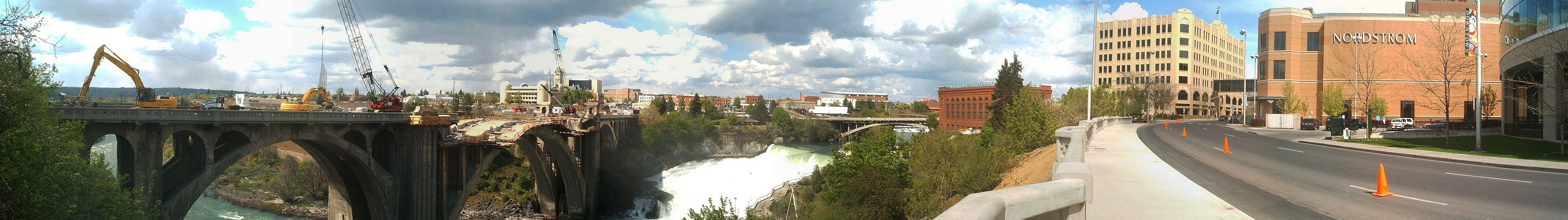
Monroe Street Bridge under renovation in 2003

The current bridge of 1911 is the third in this location. The first, a rather rickety wooden structure, was built in 1889. It was closed for a time due to arguments in the city over rights of passage and ownership, and burned down on July 22, 1890. The second was a steel bridge that opened June 27, 1892. It vibrated badly and had a noticeable dip in the center. On August 28, 1905, a consultant from the Good Roads Movement considered the bridge unsafe.

The design of the third bridge was largely copied from the Rocky River Bridge in Cleveland, Ohio, but was built one foot (0.3 m) longer to make it the largest concrete arch in the U.S. at the time. In turn, the Rocky River Bridge was modeled after the Walnut Lane Bridge in Philadelphia, which was modeled after the Adolphe Bridge in Luxembourg.

The Monroe Street bridge was designed with ornamental features such as bison skulls, covered pavilions, and a chain-link railing motif. The bison skull was an inspiration of P. C. Shine, who had found it in Alberta at Drumheller in the early 1900s. Located just west of the Falls, the bridge runs due north–south and opened on November 23, 1911.

=== 20th century modernization ===
The bridge underwent changes in 1925 and in 1934, and submitted to the modernization of Spokane. The pavilion lamps were converted to electric lighting in 1925, and the electric car railways were removed from the bridge in 1934. Approaching 65 years of service in 1976, the bridge was listed on the National Register of Historic Places.

=== 21st century restoration ===
By the 1990s, the bridge had deteriorated to the point where rebuilding it was necessary. On January 6, 2003, the bridge was closed for restoration, dismantled down to the central arch, and rebuilt faithfully to its original appearance. The bridge was reopened in 2005 on September 17, with new railings and concrete separating the walkways from the road.

== Suicides ==
The Monroe Street Bridge has a local reputation as being a suicide bridge. According to the Spokane County Medical Examiners Office, from 2006 to 2018 there was an average of 2.4 deaths per year on the bridge and nine out of 13 witnessed or videotaped incidents of bridge jumper suicides on the Spokane River were on the Monroe Street Bridge. With a bridge height from the deck floor to water of 135 feet and accounting for the air resistance drag on the human body in the 1.5 second free fall, the impact velocity at the waters surface is approximately 57.2 miles per hour which almost always causes traumatic injuries and jumpers either die of their injuries, drowning, hypothermia or a combination of these. The Spokane Police Department receives an average of 20 calls about suicidal individuals a year on the Monroe Street Bridge and despite this, there is currently (as of August 2020) no formal measures in place to try to discourage or prevent people from jumping off the bridge. The city created a Suicide Prevention Task Force in 2018 and has discussed installing safety barriers, a telephone that connects to a suicide prevention hotline on the bridge, and patrolling the bridge. Although they are often removed, members of the community sometimes place suicide prevention signage and messages of hope on the deck fence railings to make people think again about their actions and dissuade potential jumpers. Concerned citizens have petitioned local officials for permanent signage.

== See also ==
- List of crossings of the Spokane River

== Gallery ==
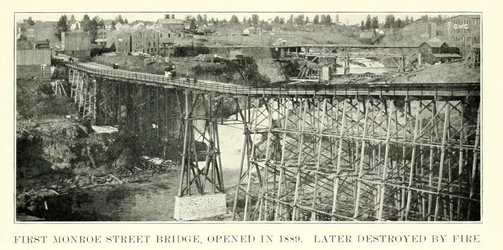
Monroe Street Bridge in 1889

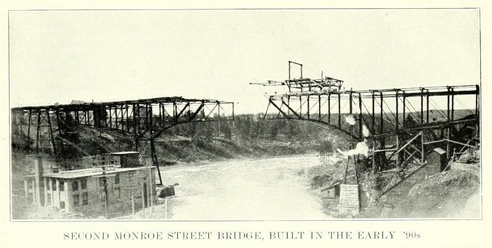
Monroe Street Bridge in 1890s

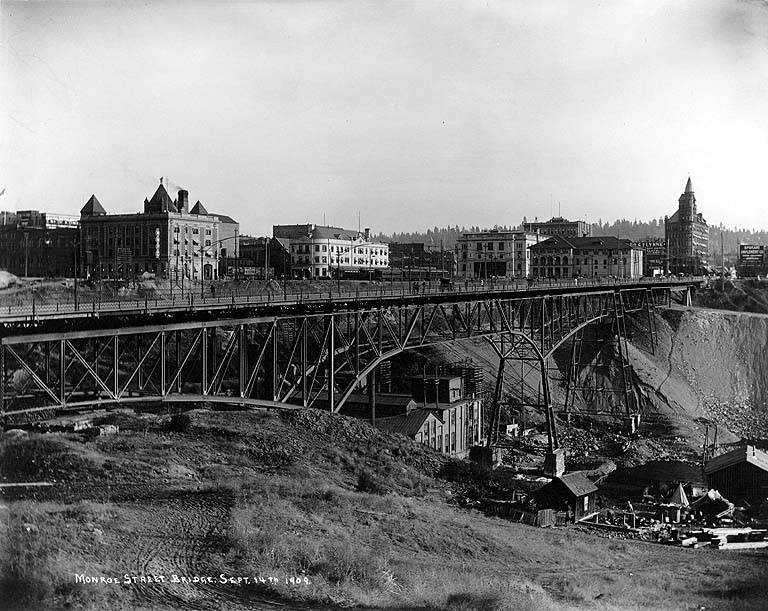
Monroe Street Bridge on September 14, 1909

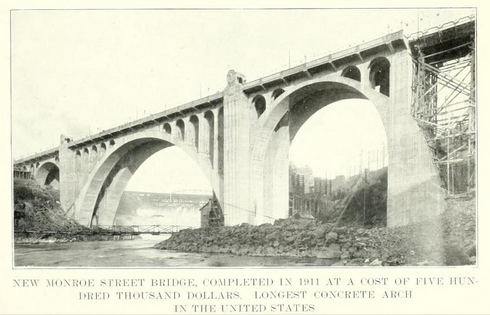
Monroe Street Bridge in 1911 shortly after completion
