= Architecture of Spokane, Washington =

Overview of the architecture in Spokane, Washington

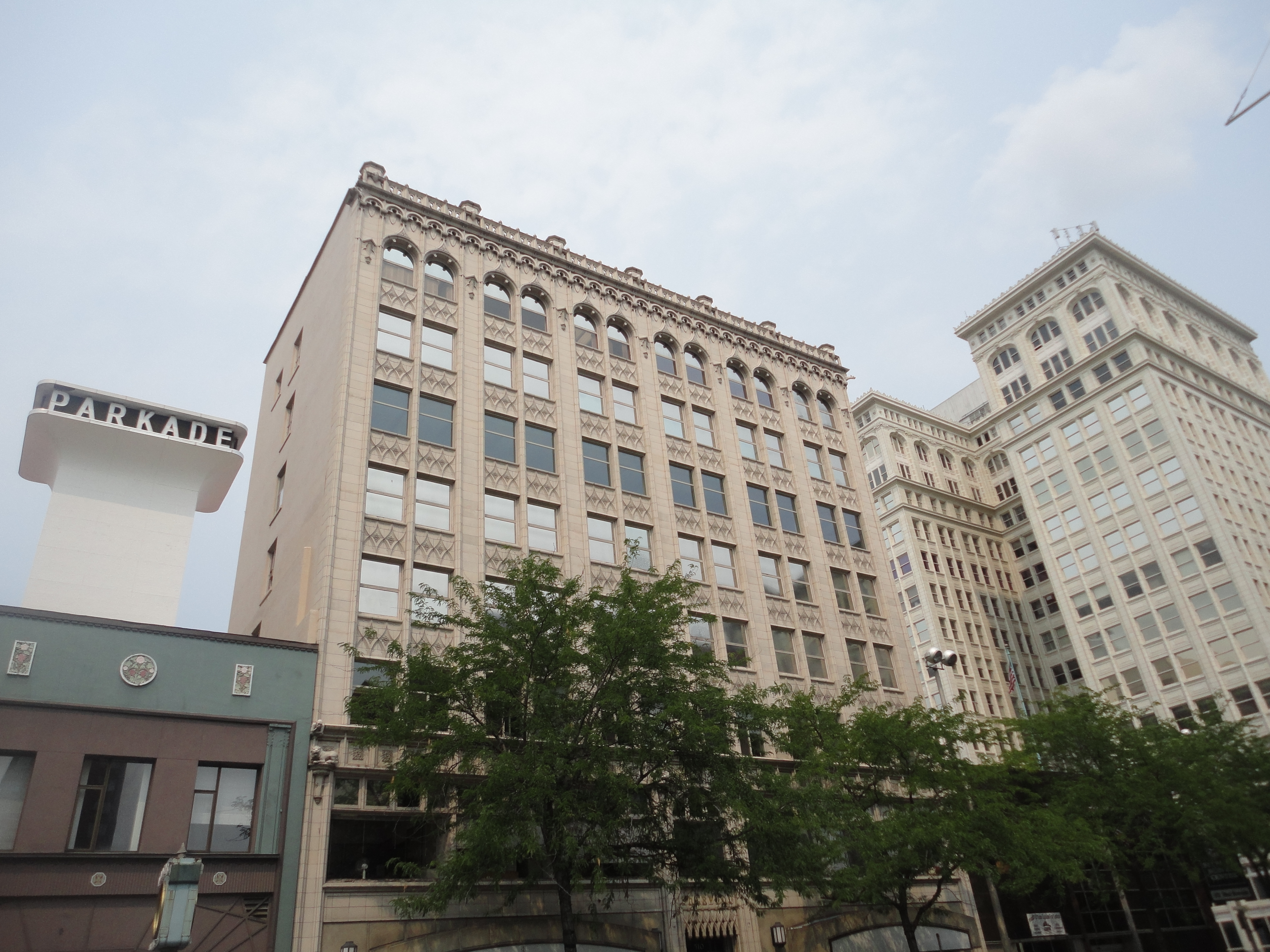
The Parkade, Cutter Building, and U.S. Bank Building

Spokane and its neighborhoods contain a patchwork of architectural styles that give them a distinct identity and illustrate the changes throughout the city's history. Spokane has a rich architectural history for a western city of its size and much of it is a product of its circumstances at the turn of the 20th century when as a rapidly growing city, the Great Fire of 1889 destroyed 32 blocks of the city center which was quickly rebuilt in a more grand fashion by a community flush with money coming from regional mining districts. Many of the architects that found work in the city and building on the blank slate of the downtown commercial district became highly esteemed architects such as Kirtland Cutter, who has been credited with giving the city a distinctive character. In particular, the city has a high concentration of Romanesque Revival style institutional and commercial buildings and American Craftsman bungalow residences. The architecture of Spokane gained national recognition in industry publications in the early 20th century.

In the second half of the 20th century, Spokane again became noticed for its architecture, this time by a new cadre of architects in the modern architecture movement, which flourished in the city. During this period which lasted from 1948 to the mid-1970s, prolific architects in the city such as Warren C. Heylman gave Spokane a great breadth of mid-century architecture. The modernists in Spokane gave the city a new look and were instrumental in the developments, design, and legacy of the Expo '74 World's Fair in what is now Riverfront Park. The city's landscape architecture and park system was strongly influenced by the Olmsted Brothers, who designed a comprehensive plan for Spokane's park system in 1908 and was implemented almost in its entirety with a $1 million ($33.7 million in 2024 dollars) bond issue in 1910. Manito Park, which was the city's primary community park until 1974, is noteworthy for having a European style formal garden with input from the Olmsted Brothers and a Japanese Garden designed by Nagao Sakurai.

== Background ==
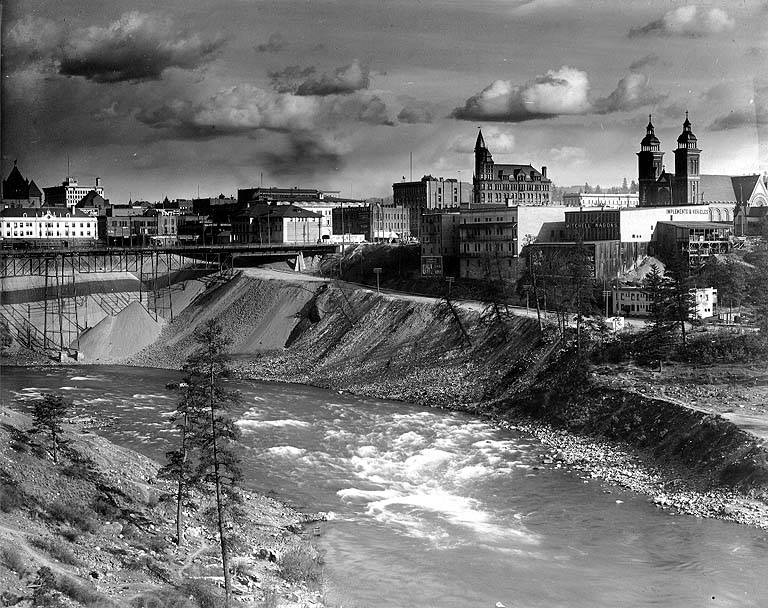
Downtown Spokane from the north bank of the Spokane River, 1909

Spokane and its neighborhoods contain a patchwork of architectural styles that give them a distinct identity and illustrate the changes throughout the city's history. Spokane has a rich architectural history for a western city of its size and much of it is a product of its circumstances at the turn of the 20th century. As a rapidly growing city when Great Fire of 1889 destroyed 32 blocks of the city center, Spokane, flush with money coming from regional mines, experienced a building boom on the blank canvas that was the downtown commercial district by now-esteemed architects such as Herman Preusse, Kirtland Cutter, and John K. Dow, who found much work in the city. Much of the buildings built in the years following the Great Fire of 1889 were built of more fire resistant materials such brick, stone, and terra cotta and on a bigger scale and in a more ostentatious fashion than the wooden buildings of a western frontier town that preceded them. Within a year, Spokane had built 100 new buildings. As the city continued to build, it was described as "the best built modern city on the continent" in a 1908 issue of The Western Architect, where the article's author went on to praise the city's architecture as distinctive, unique, and beautiful and in harmony with its setting. After a little more than a decade of work from Spokane's early architects, the city was profiled again in another publication, The Architect and Engineer, where the author muses as to why some larger cities are unable to match Spokane in its architectural footprint.

== Architectural styles ==
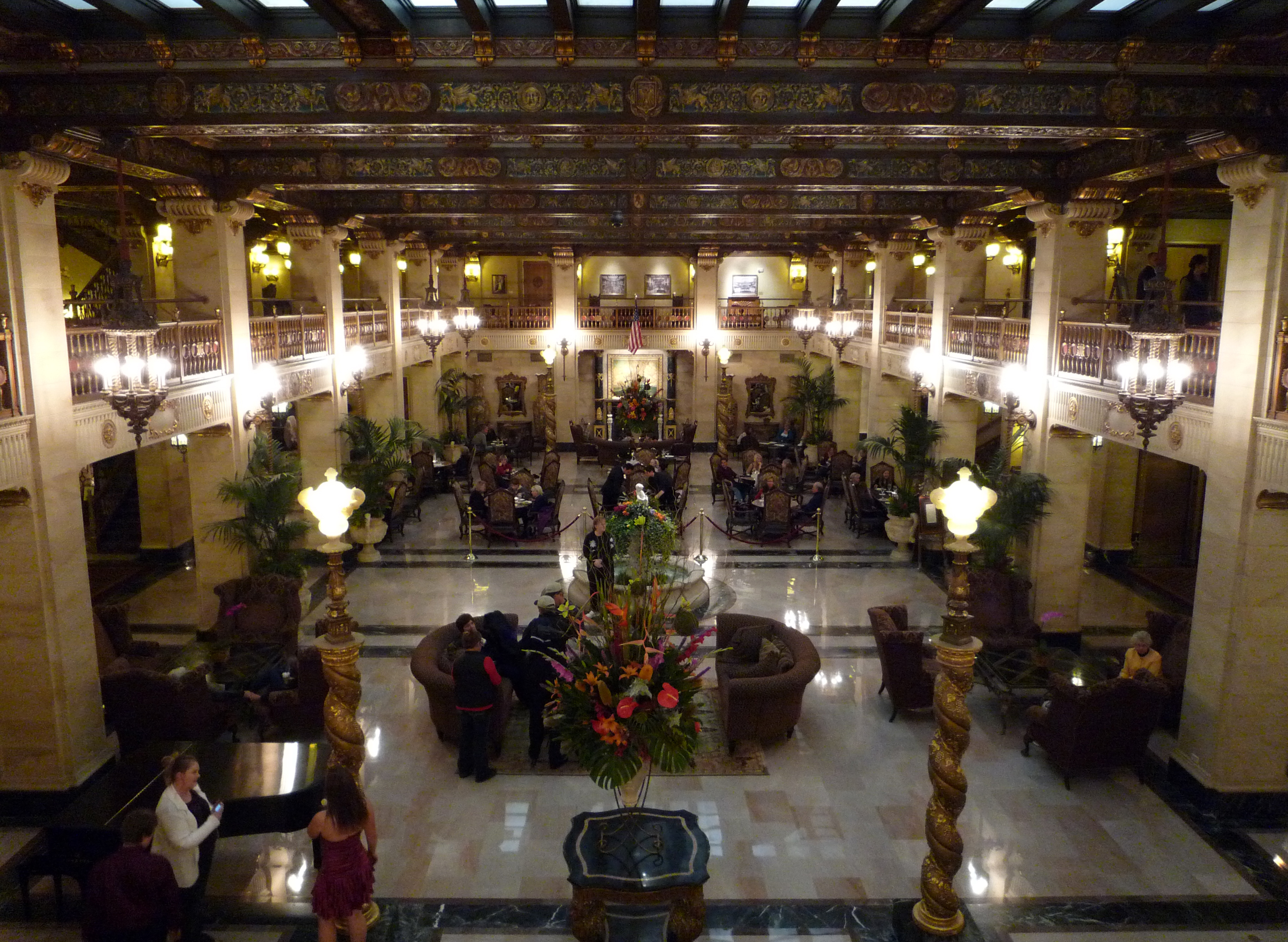
The Spanish Revival style Davenport Hotel lobby by Kirtland Cutter

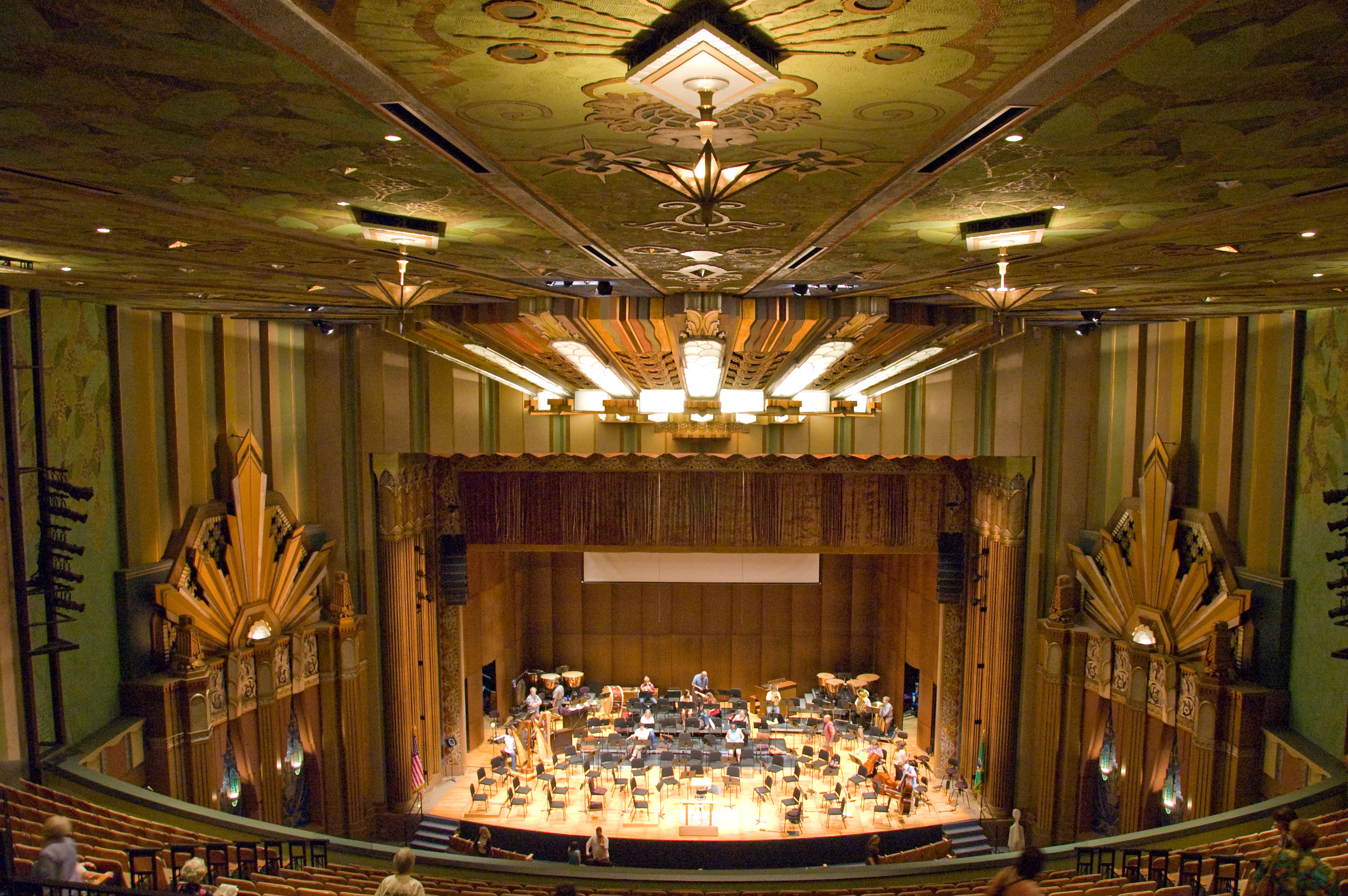
The Art Deco style Fox Theater's interior by Anthony Heinsbergen

Most of Spokane's largest buildings and landmarks are in the downtown commercial district, where many architecturally significant structures were built after the Great Fire of 1889. Many notable Spokane buildings are done in the Romanesque Revival style that was popular for institutional buildings at the turn of the 20th century. Prominent examples of this style include the Great Northern clock tower, Review Building, Cathedral of Our Lady of Lourdes, Peyton Building, The Carlyle, First Congregational Church, and Washington Water Power Post Street substation.

Other well-represented architectural styles include Art Deco (Spokane City Hall, Paulsen Medical and Dental Building, Fox Theater, John R. Rogers High School, City Ramp Garage), Renaissance Revival (Davenport Hotel, Steam Plant Square, Thomas S. Foley Courthouse, Legion Building, San Marco), Neoclassical (Masonic Center, Hutton Building, Bing Crosby Theater), Chicago School (U.S. Bank Building, Liberty Building, Old City Hall) and Modernist (The Parkade, Ridpath Hotel, Bank of America Financial Center). The tallest building in the city, at 288 feet (88 m), is the Bank of America Financial Center. Also of note is the French Renaissance Spokane County Courthouse in West Central (the building on the seal of Spokane County), the English Gothic Cathedral of St. John the Evangelist in Rockwood, the mimetic literalist Benewah Milk Bottles in Riverside and Garland, Tudor and Collegiate Gothic Mount Saint Michael in Hillyard, and the Cambern Dutch Shop Windmill in South Perry.

=== Religious institutions ===
Church architecture in Spokane

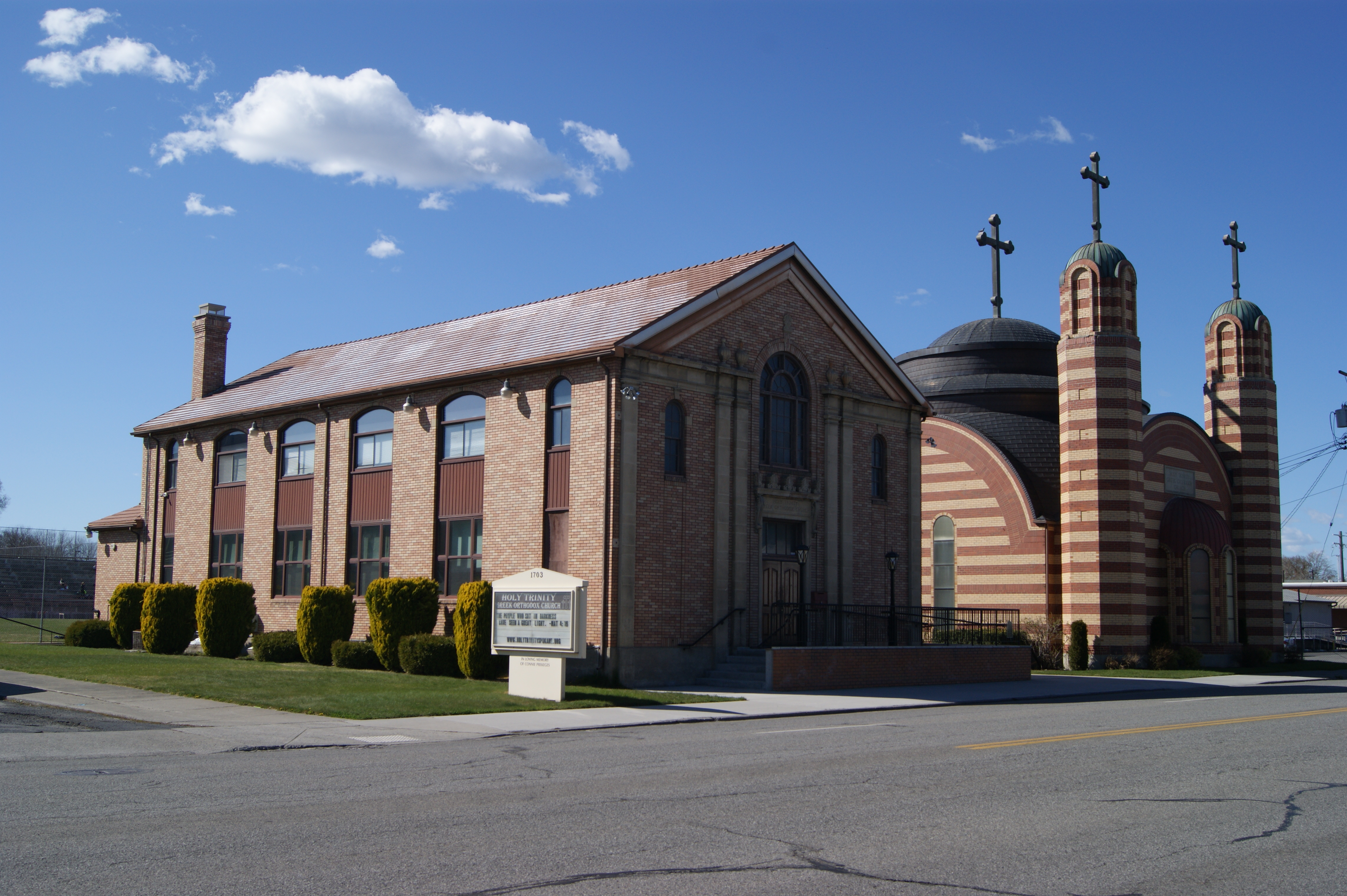
Byzantine Revival Holy Trinity Greek Orthodox Church

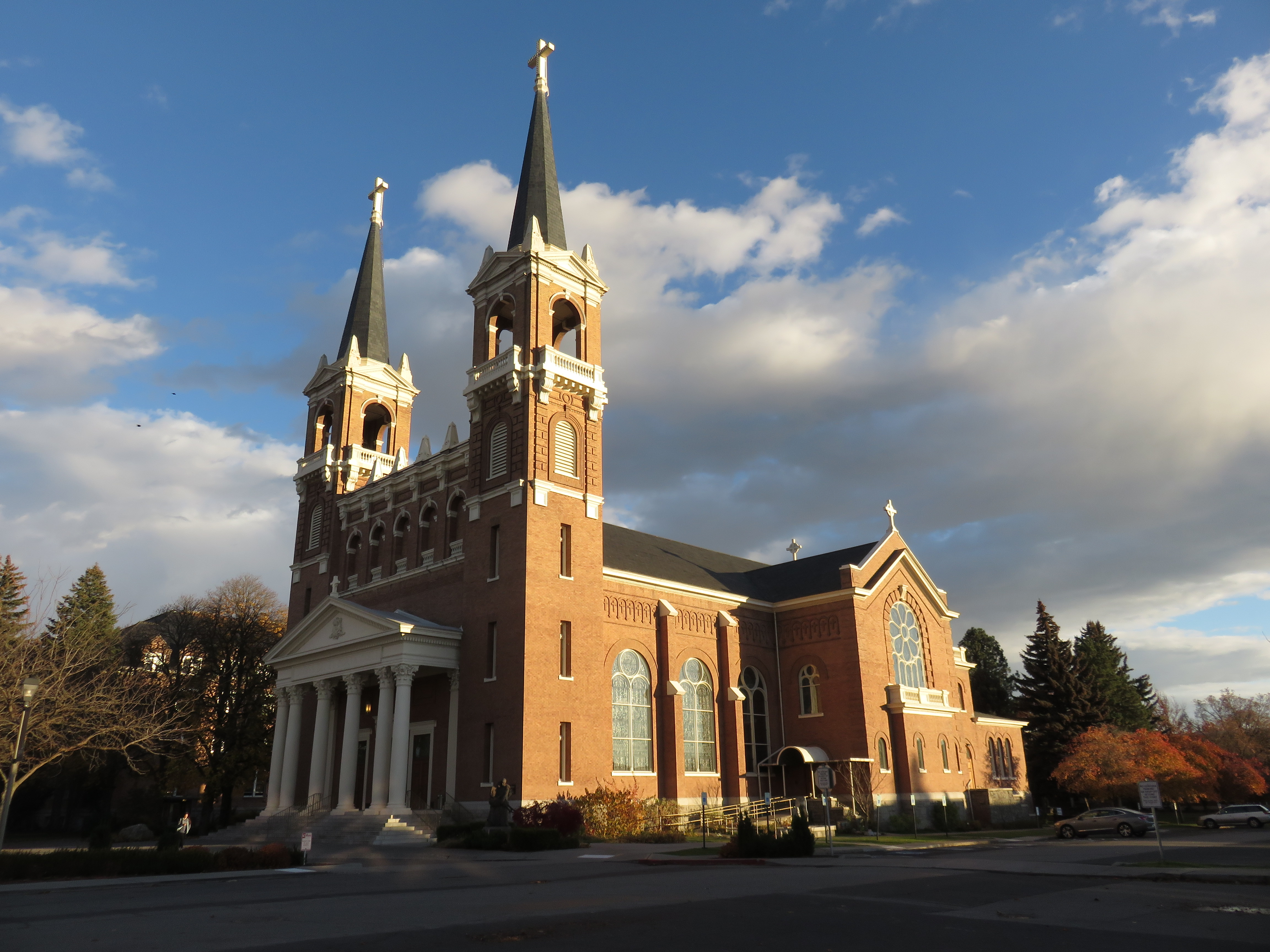
Romanesque Revival St. Aloysius Catholic Church

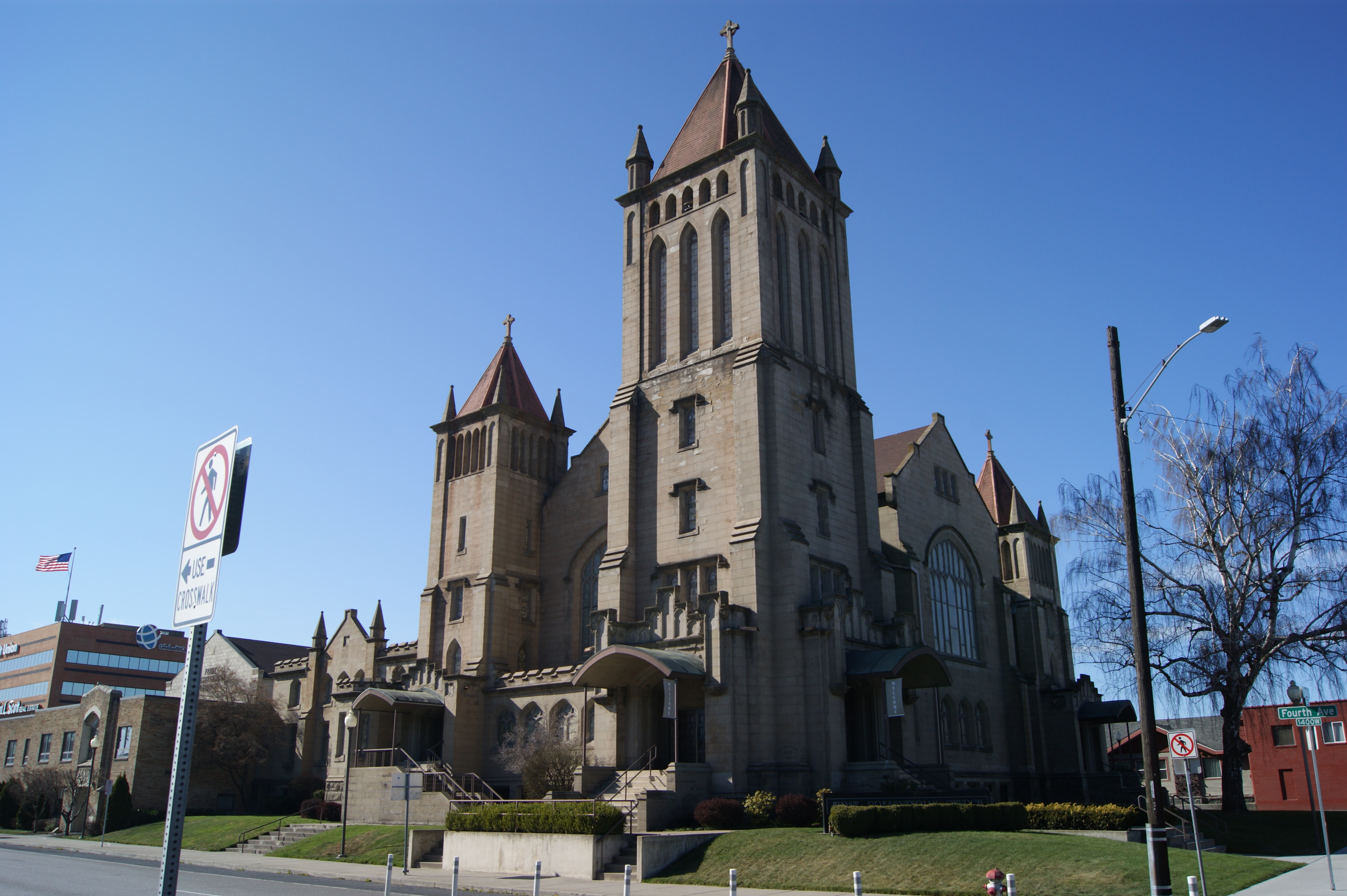
Gothic Revival First Presbyterian Church

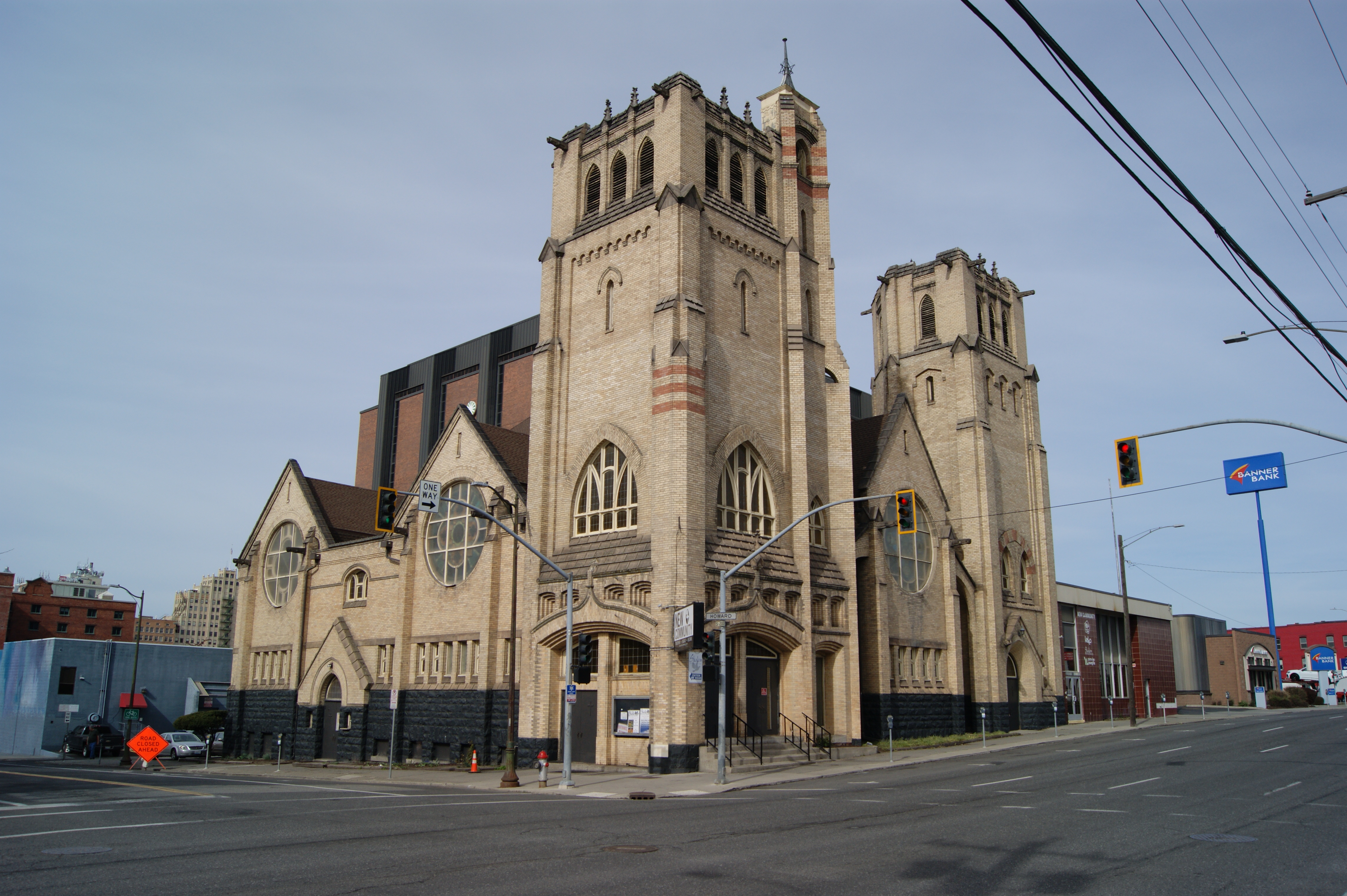
Victorian New Community Church

The Spokane area has a great number of architecturally significant religious institutions, cathedrals, and churches done in a variety of styles as different denominations sometimes have unique church architectural traditions. The most significant structures are likely the Romanesque Revival Cathedral of Our Lady of Lourdes designed in various stages by a combination of the firms Preusse & Zittel and Julian & Williams. and the English Gothic style Cathedral of St. John the Evangelist designed by Harold Whitehouse. The Cathedral of Our Lady Lourdes concept design is credited to Preusse & Zittel before construction began in 1902 and follows a cruciform plan with the apse on the south end and two 125-foot bell towers flanking the narthex entry on the north side with the nave, transept and aisles featuring ribbed vaults. The cathedral was dedicated in 1907 with Julian & Williams completing the project. The beginning of the story for the Cathedral of St. John the Evangelist begins in 1924, not long after newly arrived bishop, Edward Makin Cross came to town and hatched a plan to put a cathedral on the South Hill to succeed the All Saints Cathedral downtown, and hired church congregant, Harold C. Whitehouse to design it. Touring Europe for design inspiration, he eventually settled on using the English Gothic style with some French influences. The first stage of construction, the nave leading to the high altar was completed in late 1929, allowing for the first mass to be held, ten days before the 1929 stock market crash which led to a halt in construction for almost two decades. Construction resumed in 1948, and the chancel, sanctuary, transepts, and the Gothic tower were completed by 1954. The building is a solid masonry construction featuring a sandstone exterior quarried near Tacoma and sandstone interior from Idaho with some Indiana limestone; the building contains no structural wood or steel.

Other notable works include the Romanesque Revival St. Aloysius Church designed by Herman Preusse, the Gothic Revival Christ the Redeemer Church designed by John K. Dow, Westminster United Church of Christ also by Dow and Worthy Niver, Mount Saint Michael designed by Julius Zittel, First Presbyterian Church designed by Loren L. Rand, the Victorian New Community Church (formerly the Central United Methodist Church), Carpenter Gothic St. Aidan's Anglican Church, Pilgrim Baptist Church, and Manito United Methodist Church. The Manito United Methodist Church was designed by Kirtland Cutter and was modeled after the Basilica of Saint Francis of Assisi.

During the modernist movement in Spokane, some congregations sought not to build traditional churches, instead opting for something more unique. Two notable examples of this are the St. Charles Borromeo Catholic Church by Funk, Murray, and Johnson and the Convent of the Holy Names by Walker & McGough. The St. Charles Catholic Church, which also features art by local artist Harold Balazs and French stained glass artist, Gabriel Loire, is known for its 3-inch (76 mm) thick unsupported thin shell concrete roof that once was said to be the "largest unbalanced hyperbolic-paraboloid in the world." The Convent of the Holy Names received an A.I.A. honor in 1967 recognizing it as the finest architectural design in the nation for that year.

=== Educational institutions ===
High school architecture in Spokane

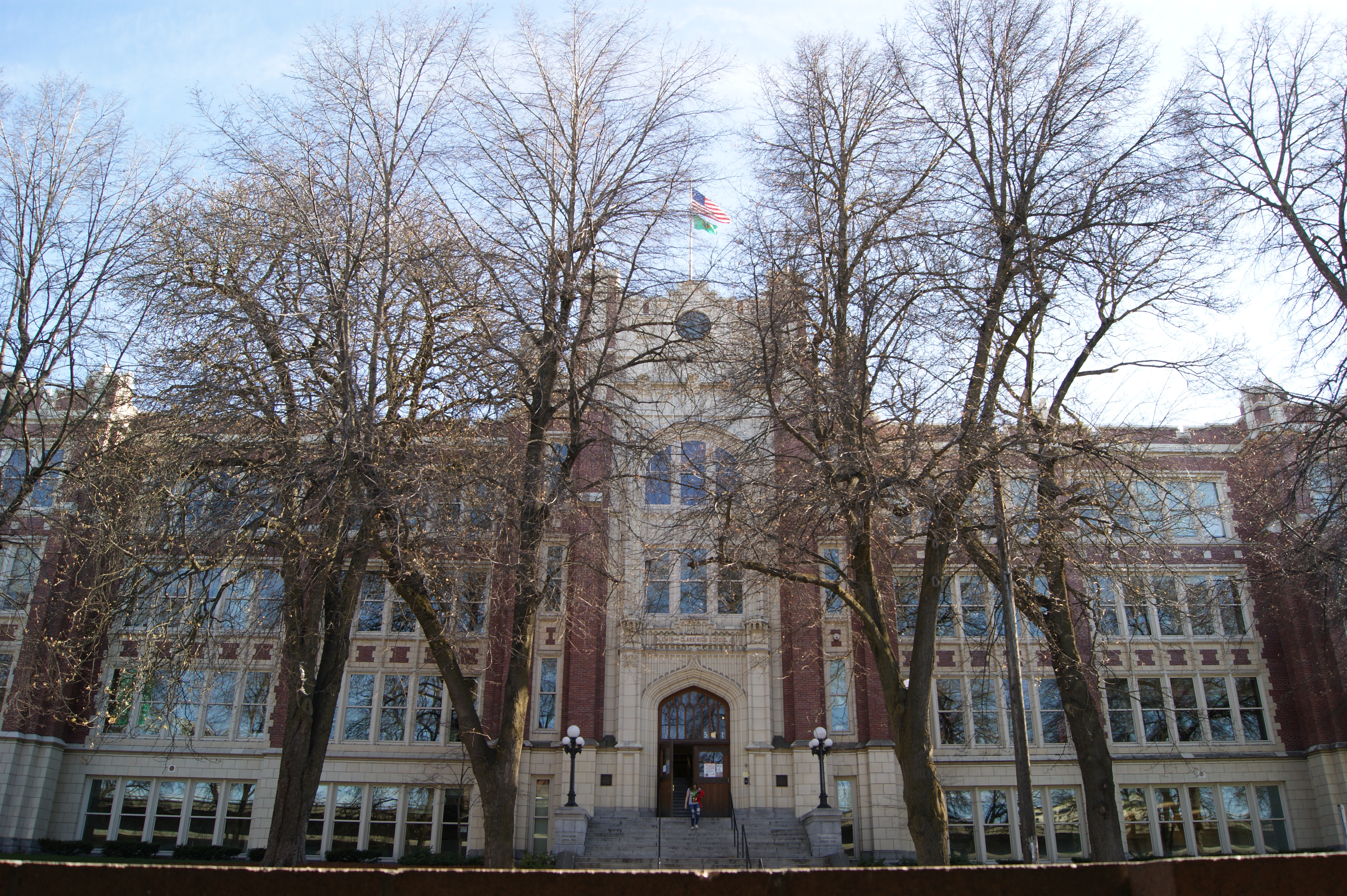
Collegiate Gothic Lewis and Clark High School

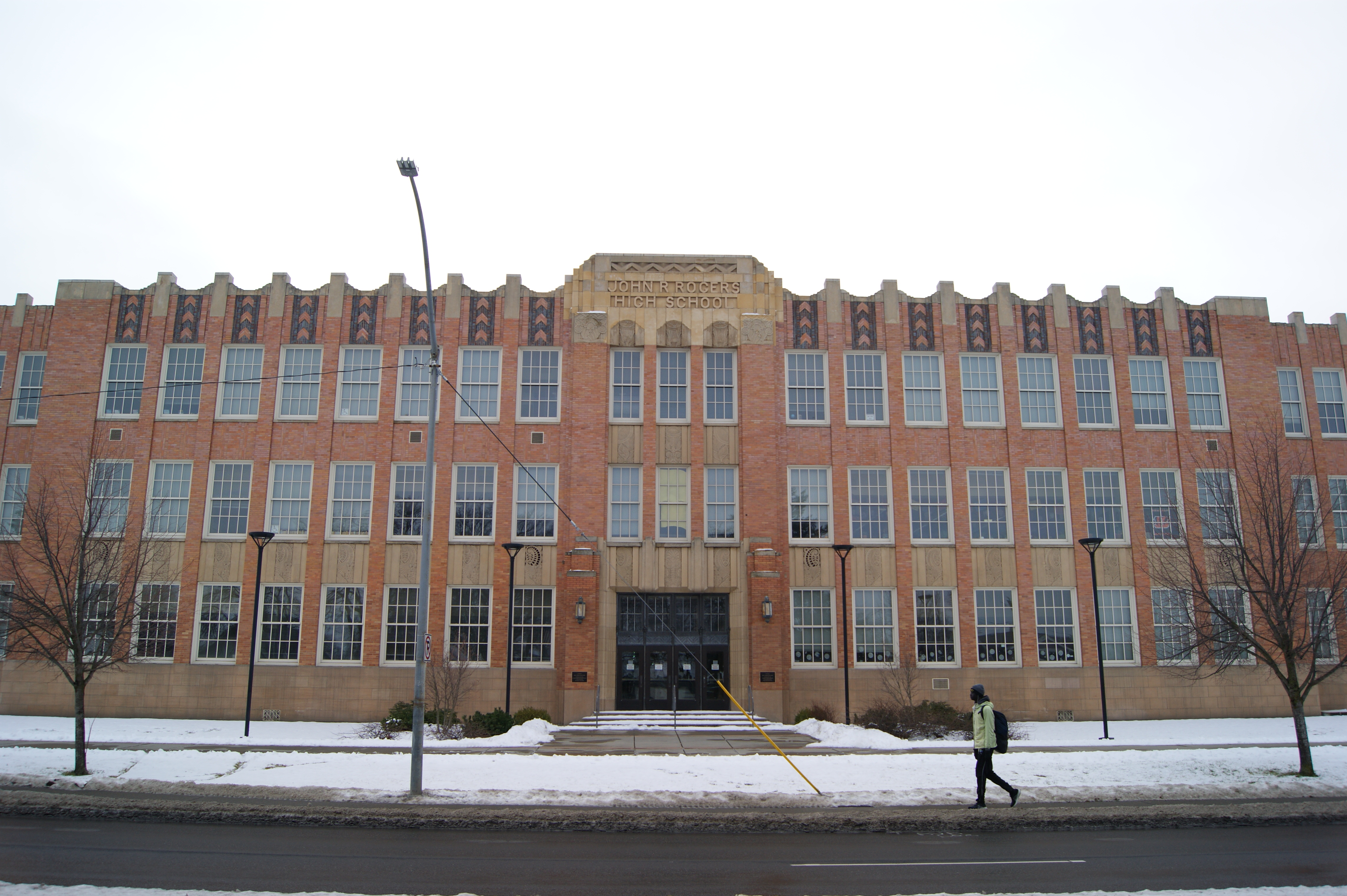
Art Deco John R. Rogers High School

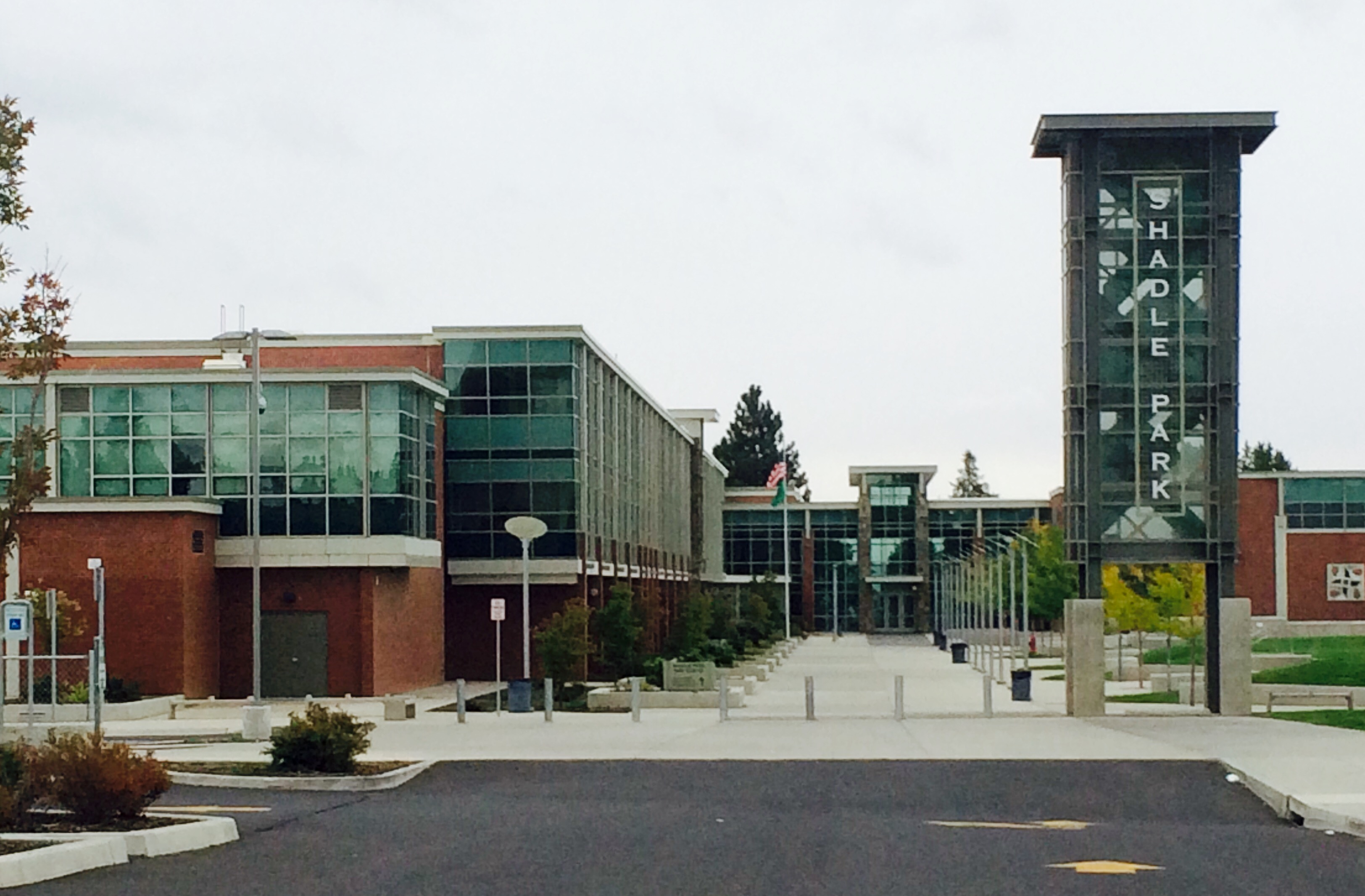
Modernist Shadle Park High School

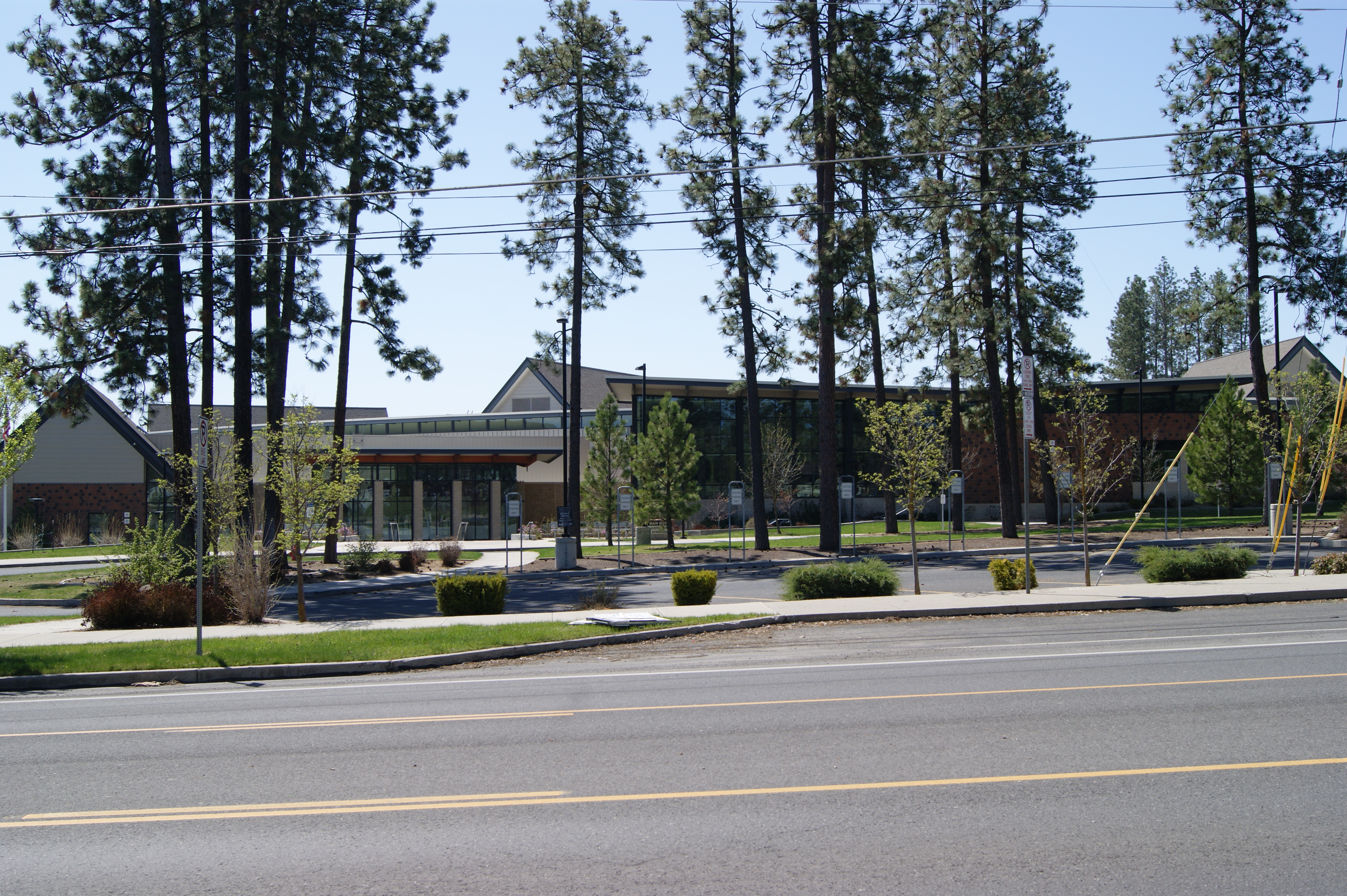
Contemporary Joel E. Ferris High School

Some of Spokane's high schools and educational institutions are historic buildings and notable for their architecture. The first and one of the most striking is the Collegiate Gothic style Lewis and Clark High School designed by Loren Rand. Built in 1910 and 1911, Rand is said to have worked passionately on the project and dedicated an unusual amount of time on research, especially for the architectural embellishments which featured a clock tower and an entryway evoking elements of a European Gothic cathedral. Lewis and Clark High School was listed on the National Register of Historic Places (NRHP) in 2001 following a renovation and expansion. Also listed on the NRHP following a 2009 renovation and expansion is John R. Rogers High School, built in 1932 and designed by John Dow in Art Deco, a rarely used style for a high school, it features zigzags, chevrons, and vegetation etched on its exterior walls. During the years when modernist architecture was flourishing in the city, two high schools were constructed, Shadle Park High School and Joel E. Ferris High School. Shadle Park High School was built in 1957 well after the modernist movement had caught on nationwide and started peaking in the 1950s; as the first school to be constructed in this new forward-thinking, modern style, the high school was highly anticipated to be a bold statement that the city had entered a new era. The architect chosen for the design of the school was Culler, Gale, Martell & Norrie, a local firm that specialized in modern institutional buildings that was affiliated with Perkins and Will out of Chicago. In high contrast to the past high schools made of brick and mortar with symmetric layouts, Shadle Park High School was clad in a concrete and multi-tiered, asymmetrical glass façade and incorporated glass curtain walls and a variety of construction media including composite materials and on the interior it featured an asymmetrical hallway layout with shiny aluminum door frames and stair railings. As a showcase for modern construction, architecture, and education, the $3 million cost of the building was reportedly the most expensive project undertaken in city history. Shadle Park completed a renovation and expansion in 2008, which preserved its appearance and modernized it for the future. The last high school to be built in the city was Ferris High School in 1963. The design is most notable for its open air campus, with buildings connected via breezeways, a concept that was popular in California at the time but was highly unusual for the area and a problematic choice given Spokane's harsh winters. The high school was renovated in 2013 by NAC Architecture, tearing down all but the original Moritz Kundig designed auditorium and a gym that was added in 2007 to create a single wheel-and-spoke looking structure linking the existing buildings with classroom "wings" surrounded by a central mall.

=== Residential ===
==== Single family homes ====
Residential architecture in Spokane

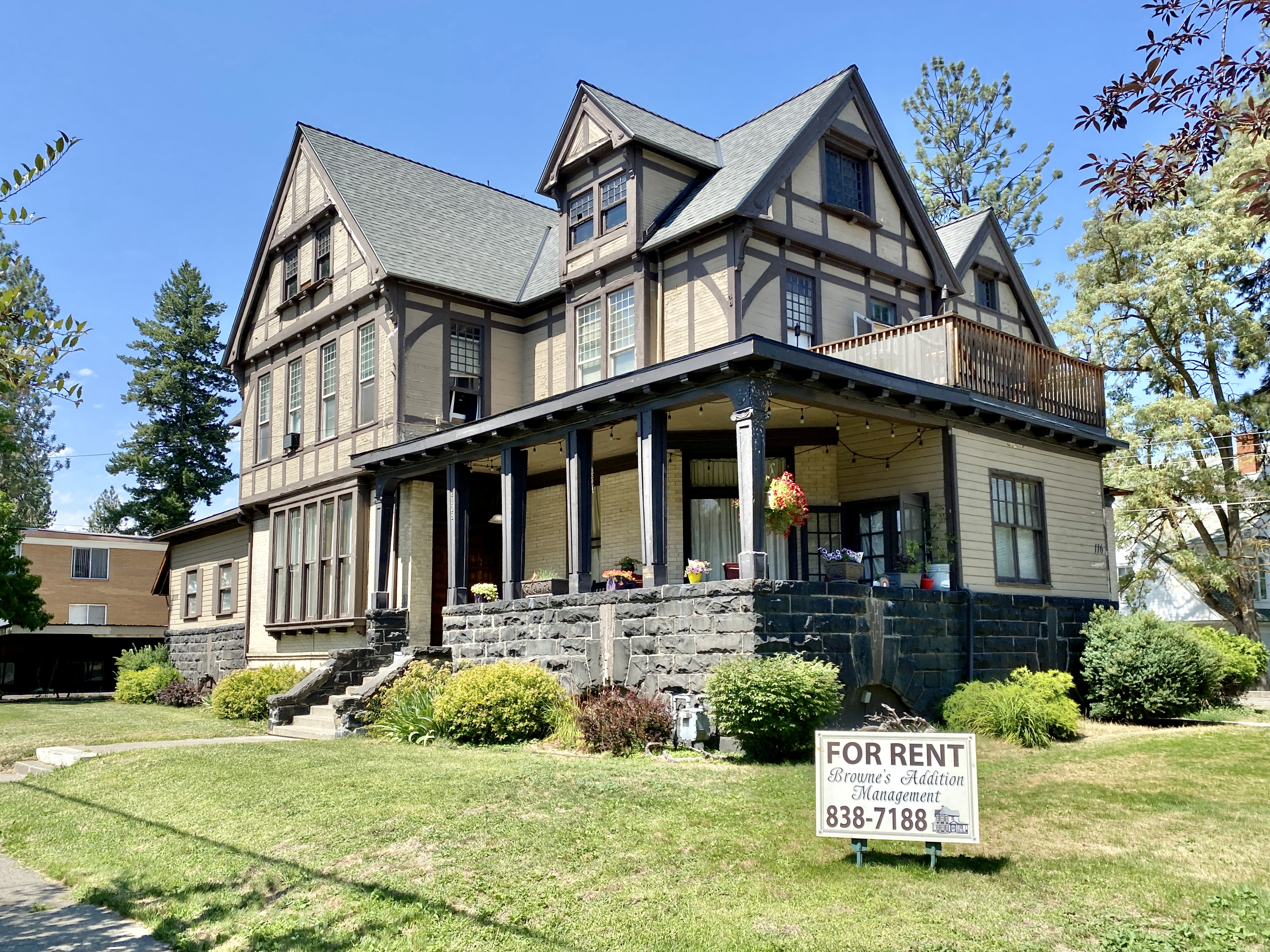
English Tudor Revival house in Browne's Addition

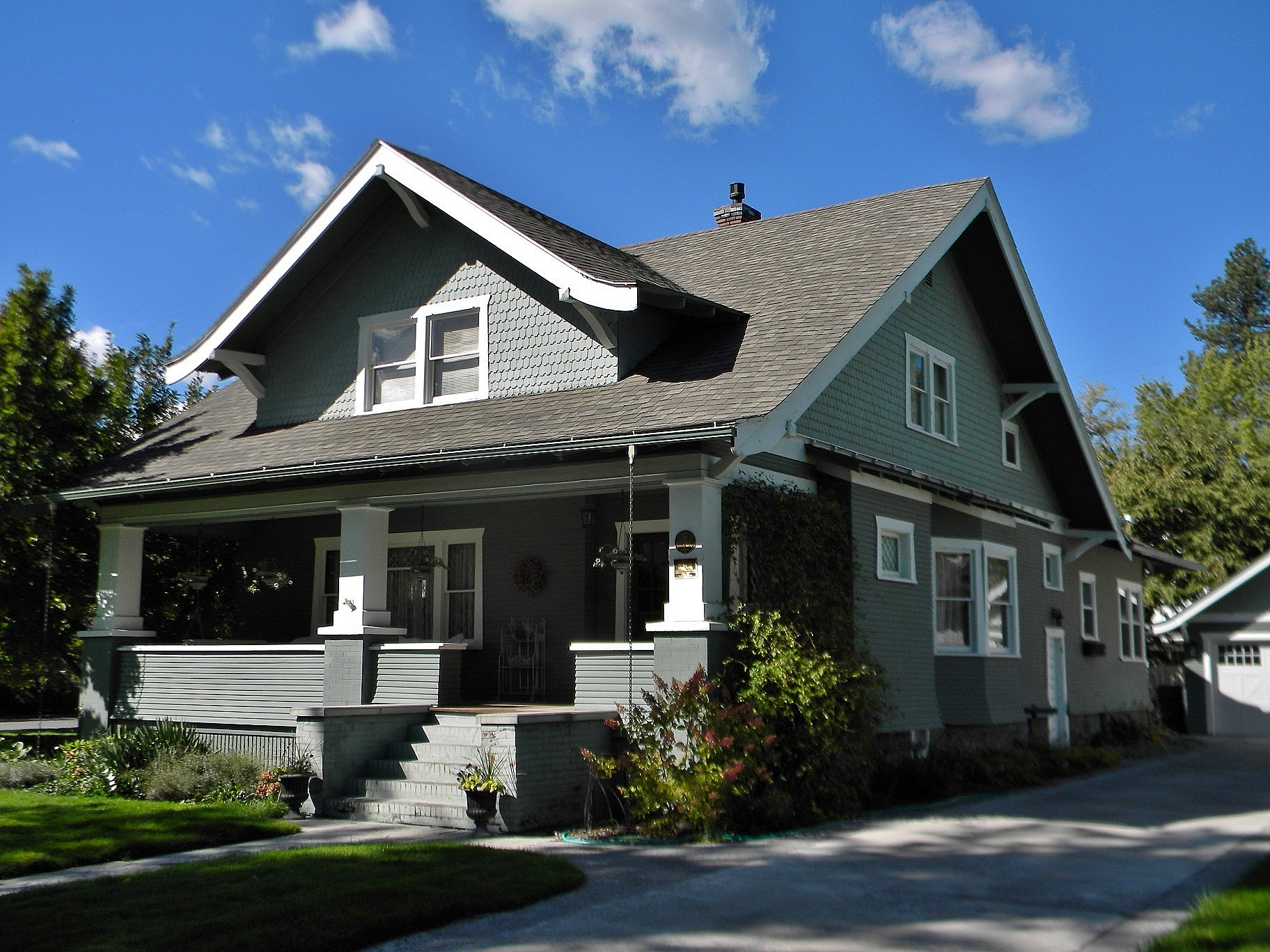
American Craftsman George and Nellie Canfield House in West Central

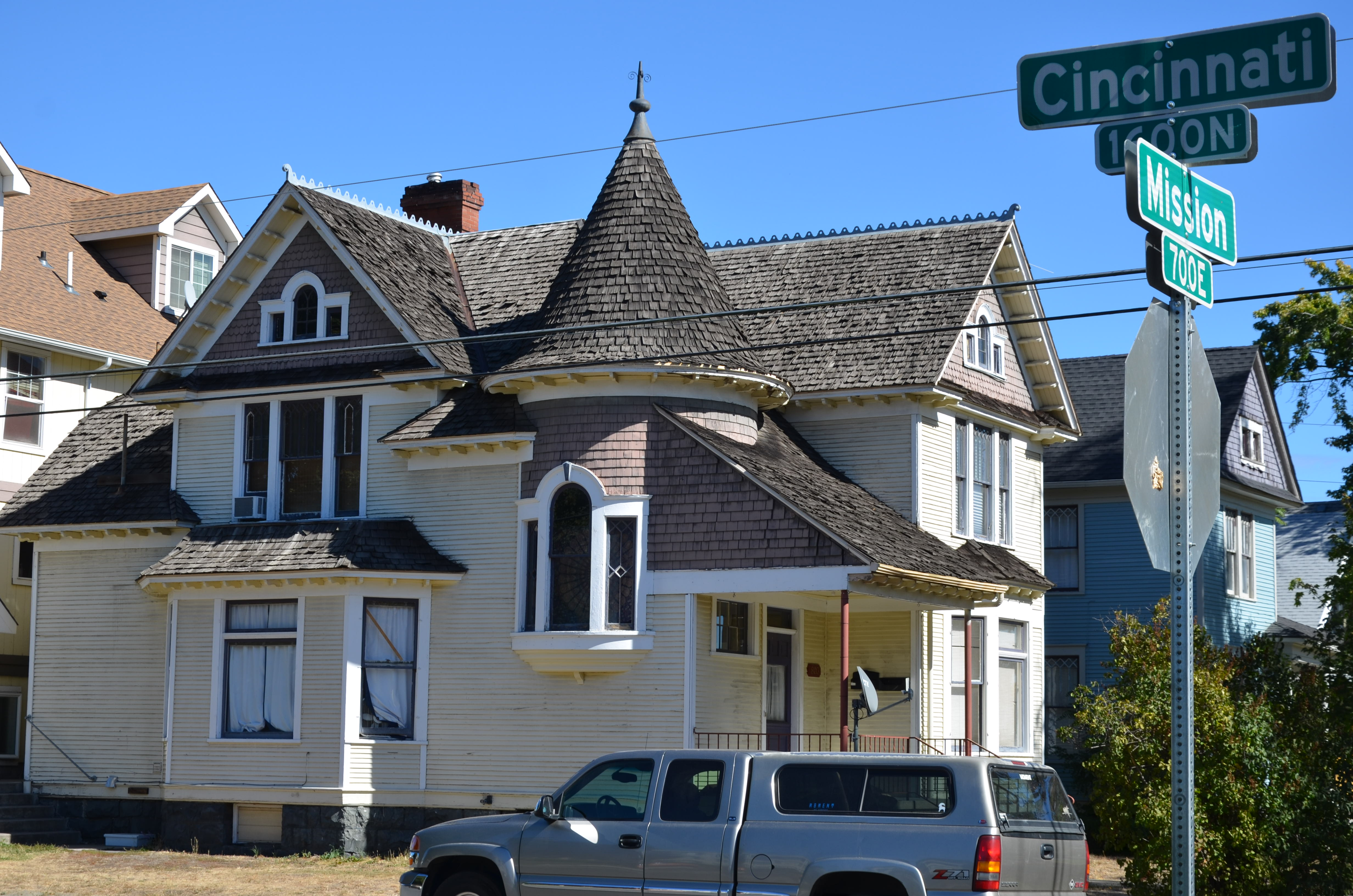
Queen Anne house in the Mission Avenue Historic District in Logan

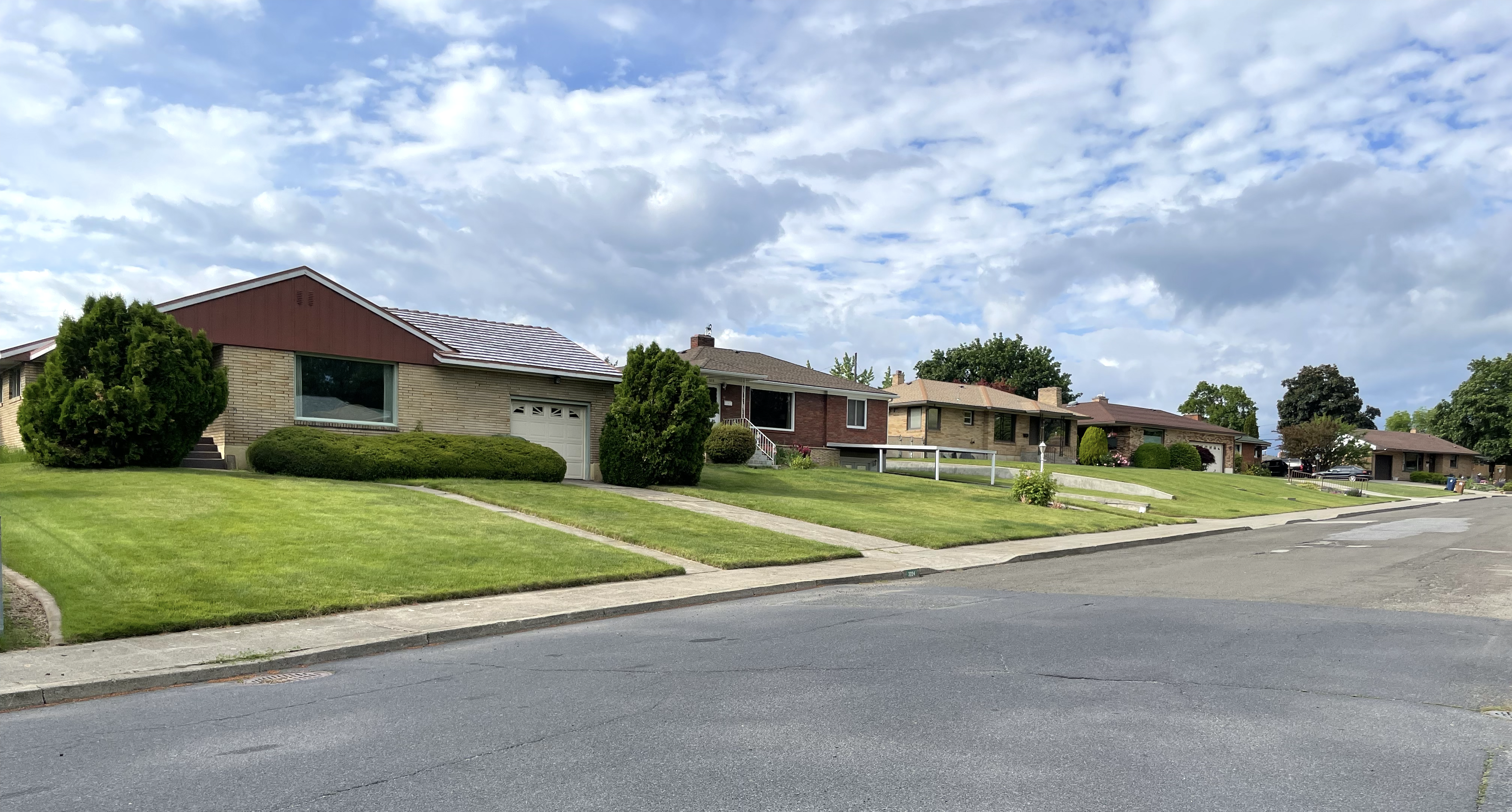
Ranch-style houses in the Northwest neighborhood

As an early affluent Spokane neighborhood, the Browne's Addition neighborhood and residences contain the largest variety of residential architecture in the city. These residences are lavish and personalized, featuring many architectural styles that were popular and trendy in the Pacific Northwest from the late 19th century to 1930, such as the Victorian and Queen Anne styles. Some of these notable early Spokane residences include the Patsy Clark Mansion and the Campbell House in Browne's Addition.

The older neighborhoods of the early 20th century, such as West Central, East Central, Emerson/Garfield, Logan, Hillyard, and much of the lower South Hill, feature a large concentration of American Craftsman style bungalows. Of these, Hillyard is the most architecturally intact neighborhood in Spokane where 85 percent of the buildings are designated as being historic. These simple and affordable homes contrast greatly with those built earlier in the highly embellished and extravagant Browne's addition and instead exude a more modern for the time aesthetic that emphasizes decorative restraint, structural honesty, and solid workmanship. The Arts and Crafts or "California bungalow" was popularized and epitomized by the firm Greene and Greene in southern California. In 1911, it became apparent that the developers overbuilt the market and there was a sharp reduction in new home construction for a period of time.

The architectural blueprints of a Minimal Traditional house built in 1941 in Browne's Addition. A later addition to the older neighborhood, this style was popular from the 1930s to early 1950s.

As the city expanded mainly to the north in the middle of the 20th century, the bungalows in the Minimal Traditional style commonplace from the 1930s to the 1950s tend to predominate in the Northwest, North Hill, and Bemiss, Nevada Heights, and Whitman neighborhoods. These early architectural styles occupy the neighborhoods where the integrity of Spokane's street grid pattern is largely intact (especially the former streetcar suburb areas north of downtown and south of Francis Ave.), and the houses have detached carports with backyard alleys for deliveries, and refuse collection.

In the neighborhoods north of Francis Avenue, much of the neighborhood developments are almost exclusively single-family detached homes (such as those in Balboa/South Indian Trail, Five Mile, Town and Country, and Shiloh Hills) and consist of ranch-style houses, which made up the bulk of post World War II era neighborhoods in the country at the time. Ranch style houses of the post World War II era tend to feature two stories, a low pitched roof, horizontally oriented windows, and a prominent chimney. An isolated exception to the post war styles seen north of Francis Avenue is in Country Homes near Whitworth University, which was a real estate development of railroad tycoon Jay P. Graves in the early 1900s and contains an area with the older style bungalows seen elsewhere in the city. Other forms of residential contemporary architecture are prevalent in the north Spokane suburbs and south edges of Spokane as well as in the new Kendall Yards neighborhood north of downtown which is an urban infill development that adheres to New Urbanism design principles.

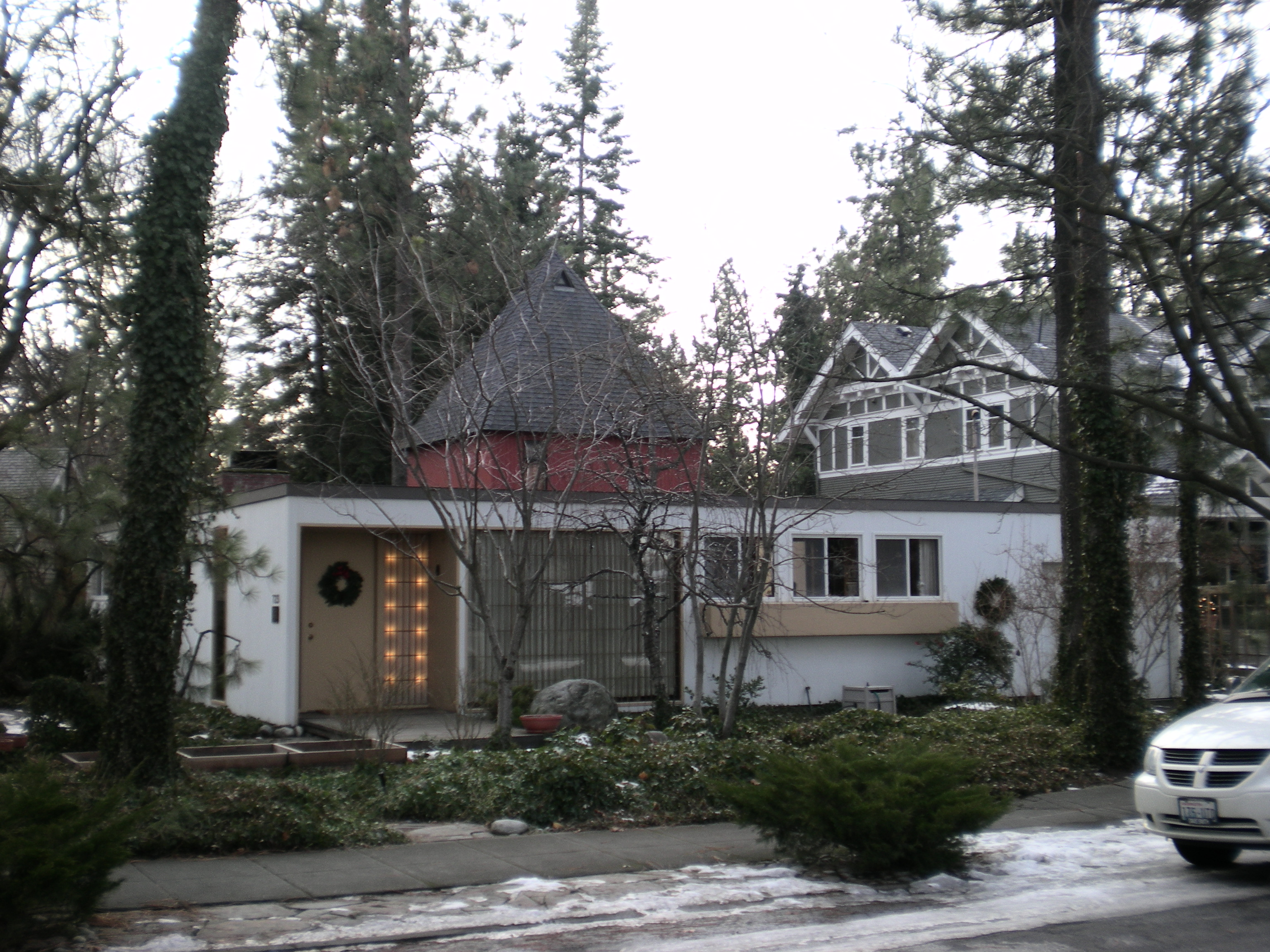
Modernist Kenneth and Edna Brooks House in Cliff/Cannon

With the modernist movement strong in Spokane, there are some notable modern residences in the inventory of Spokane houses; modernist residences are almost always architect designed high-style houses. They are distinguished by their exterior with minimal ornamentation, often a flat or sloping roof, clean lines and flat planes with large windows that let the light in. Interior hallmarks of modernist design will often include built in cabinetry and heavy use of partial walls. Spokane has one Neutra house in its inventory, the Fischer House which was built in 1951 by renowned Los Angeles-based architect, Richard Neutra. Neutra came to America to work for Frank Lloyd Wright and was called "one of the world's half-dozen top modern architects" by Time magazine in 1949. The Fischer House is in the International style which for residences is typified by flat roofs, planar surfaces with minimal embellishment; the Fischer House is notably more rustic looking than his works in southern California, being built with wood rather than stucco as he was advised it would be more appropriate to the Pacific Northwest and consistent with the Northwest Regional style. The Sixteenth Avenue House located on the South Hill was designed by the firm Walker & McGough in 1951, and the Brooks House, which was designed by local architect Kenneth Brooks as his personal residence. Another local modernist architect that built personal residence in the style was William Trogdon, his house, the Trogdon house, was built in 1963 and typifies the Northwest Regional style.

==== Multi-family residences and apartments ====
Multi-family architecture in Spokane

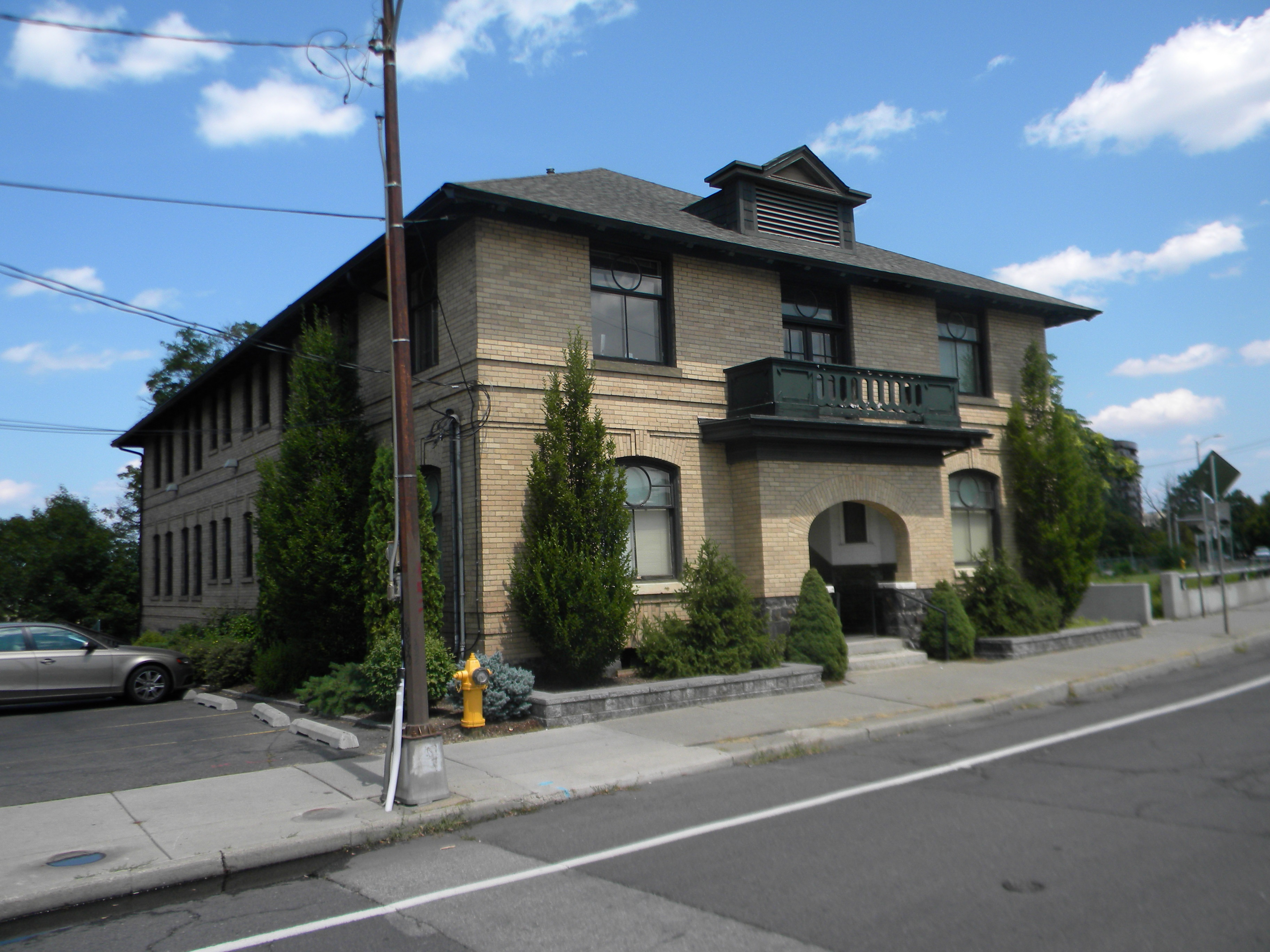
Amman, 1904

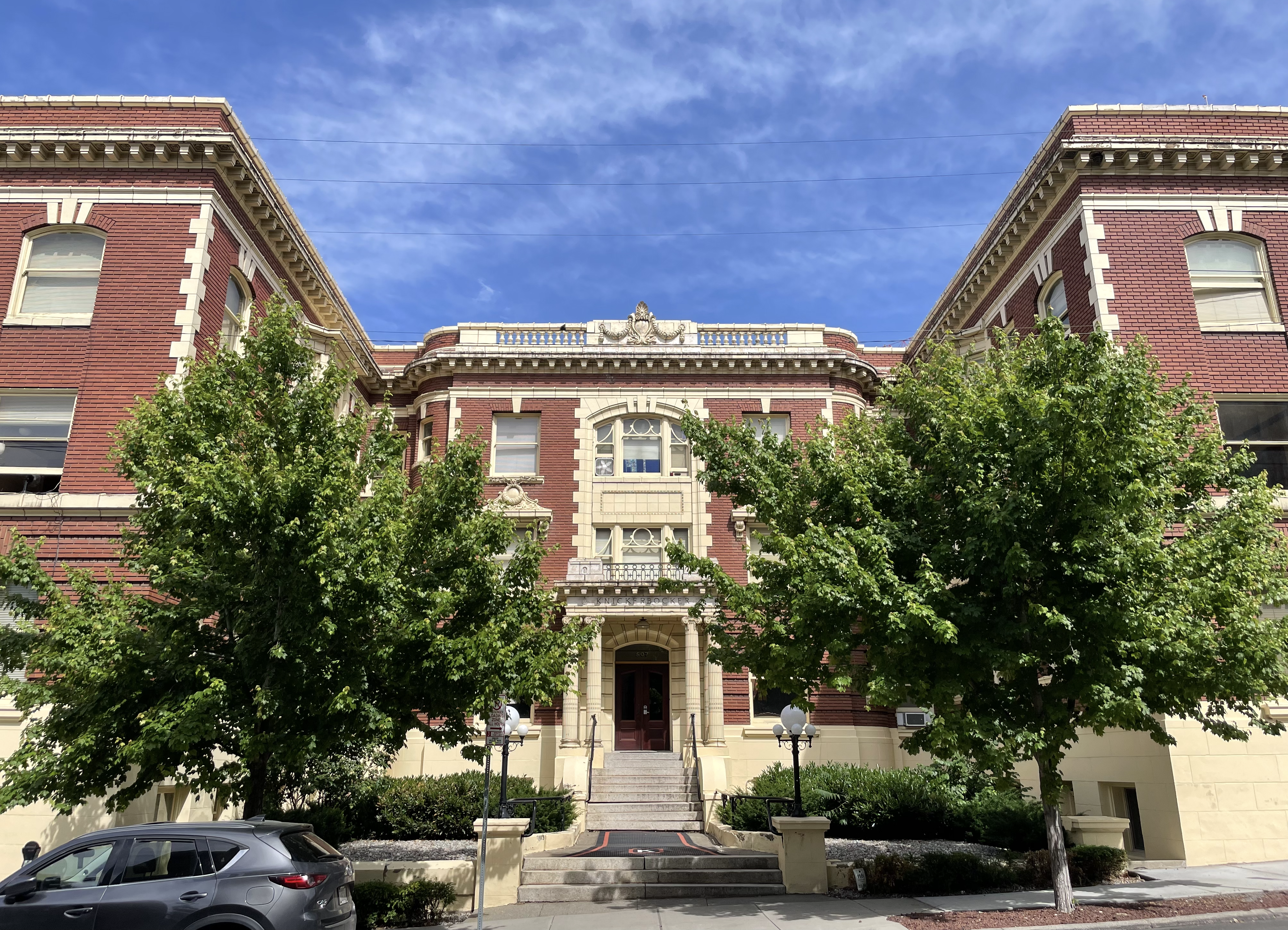
Knickerbocker, 1911

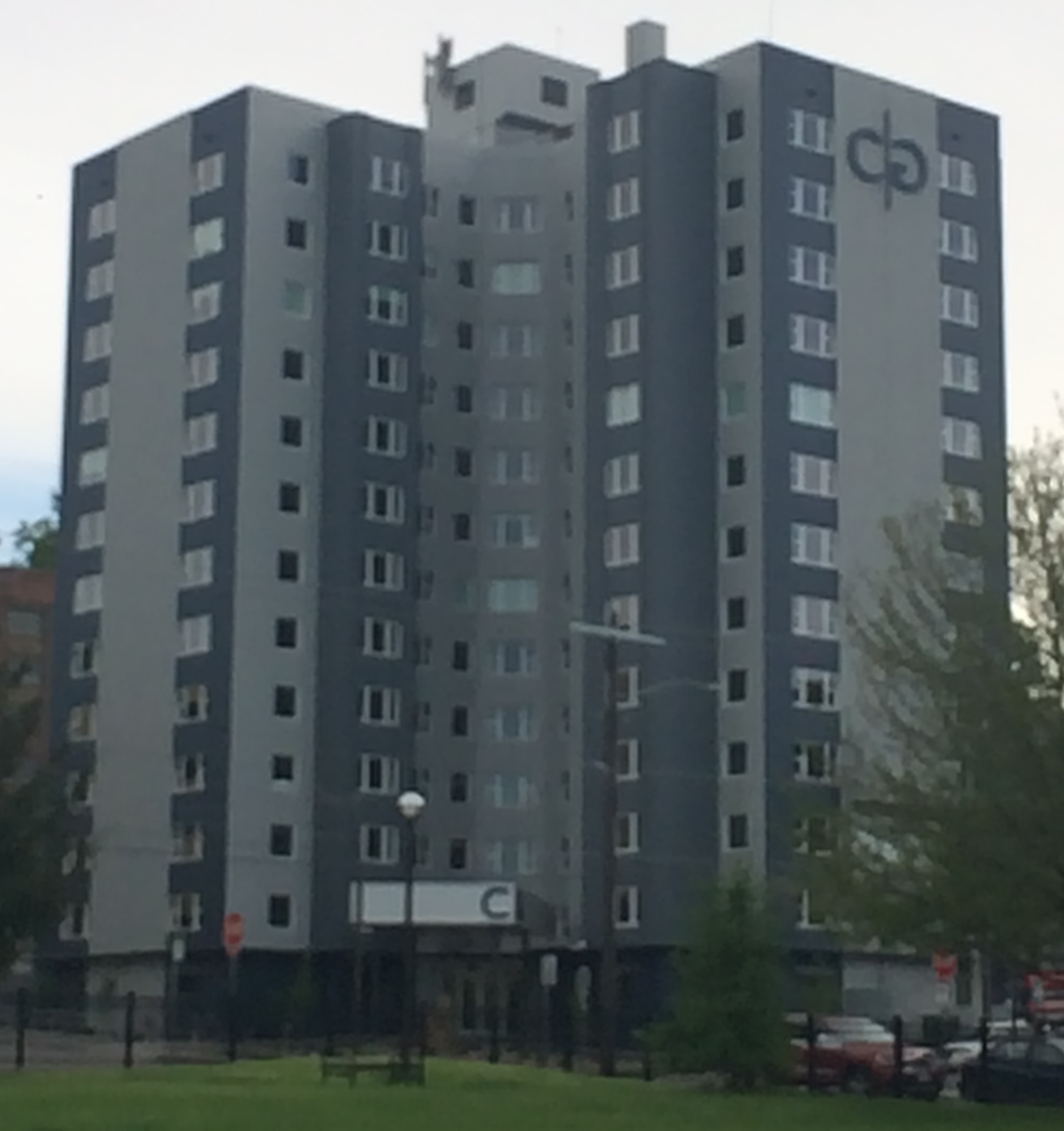
Cooper-George, 1952

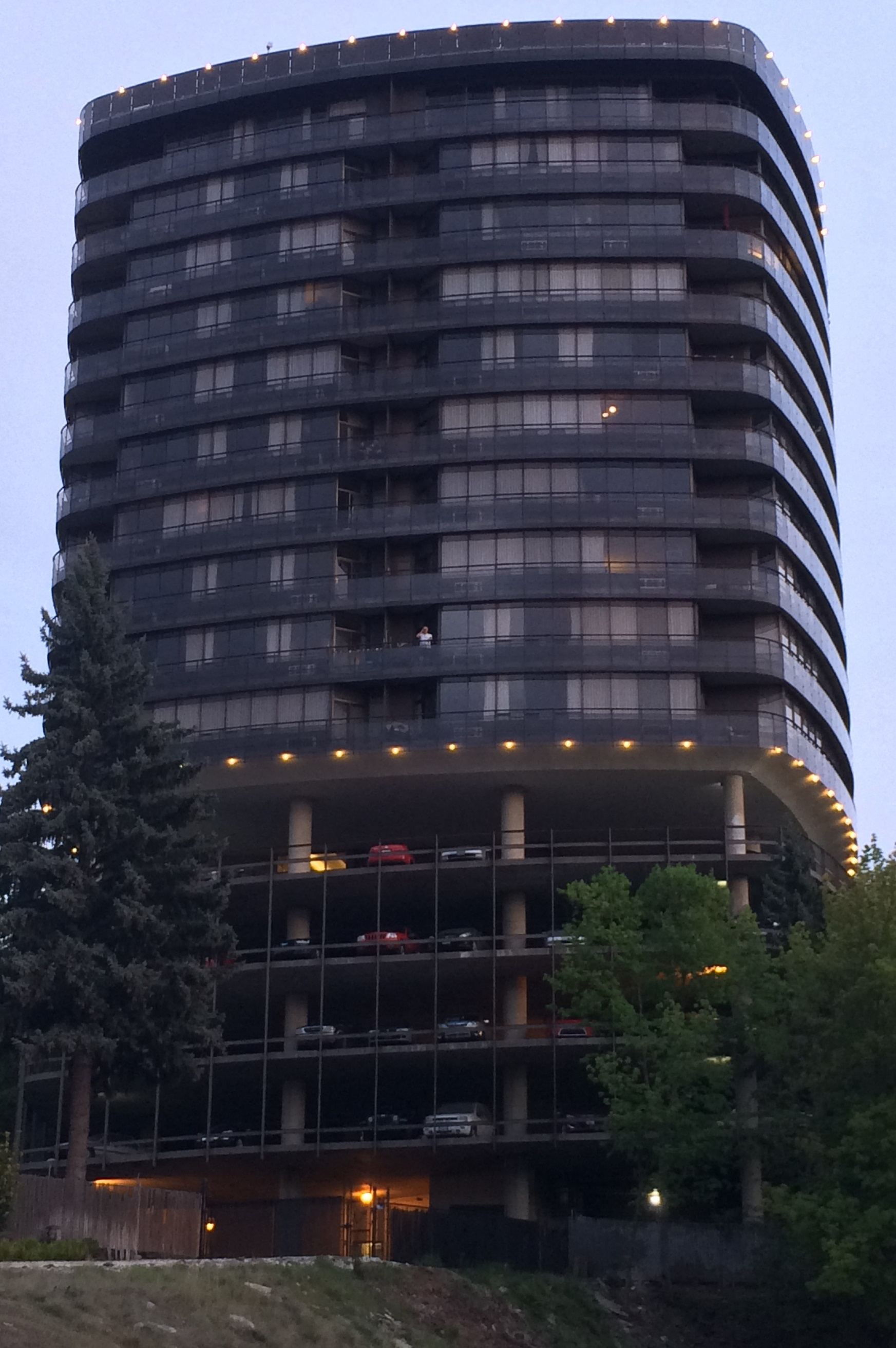
Riverfalls Tower, 1972

In the late 19th and early 20th century in Spokane after the Great Fire of 1889, longer term multifamily residential housing primarily consisted of the single room occupancy (SRO), which was a type of affordable housing with frugal amenities aimed at working class laborers; usually featuring a private room with a window, bed, closet, and sometimes a sink with communal spaces, such as a restroom and shower on each floor and retail spaces on the first floor. These SROs such as the Otis Hotel, and Hotel Upton helped fulfill a need for housing during Spokane's boom years when hundreds of men came to the city by train to seek work in the regional mining and logging camps or work the fields in agriculture. The early commercial-style Otis Hotel is one of the few still extant examples of the over 150 SROs that were constructed during Spokane's most significant period of growth from 1900 to 1910. The pace of construction was such that the December 19, 1903, edition of The Spokesman-Review reported that the city "leads the nation in percentage of residential building construction."

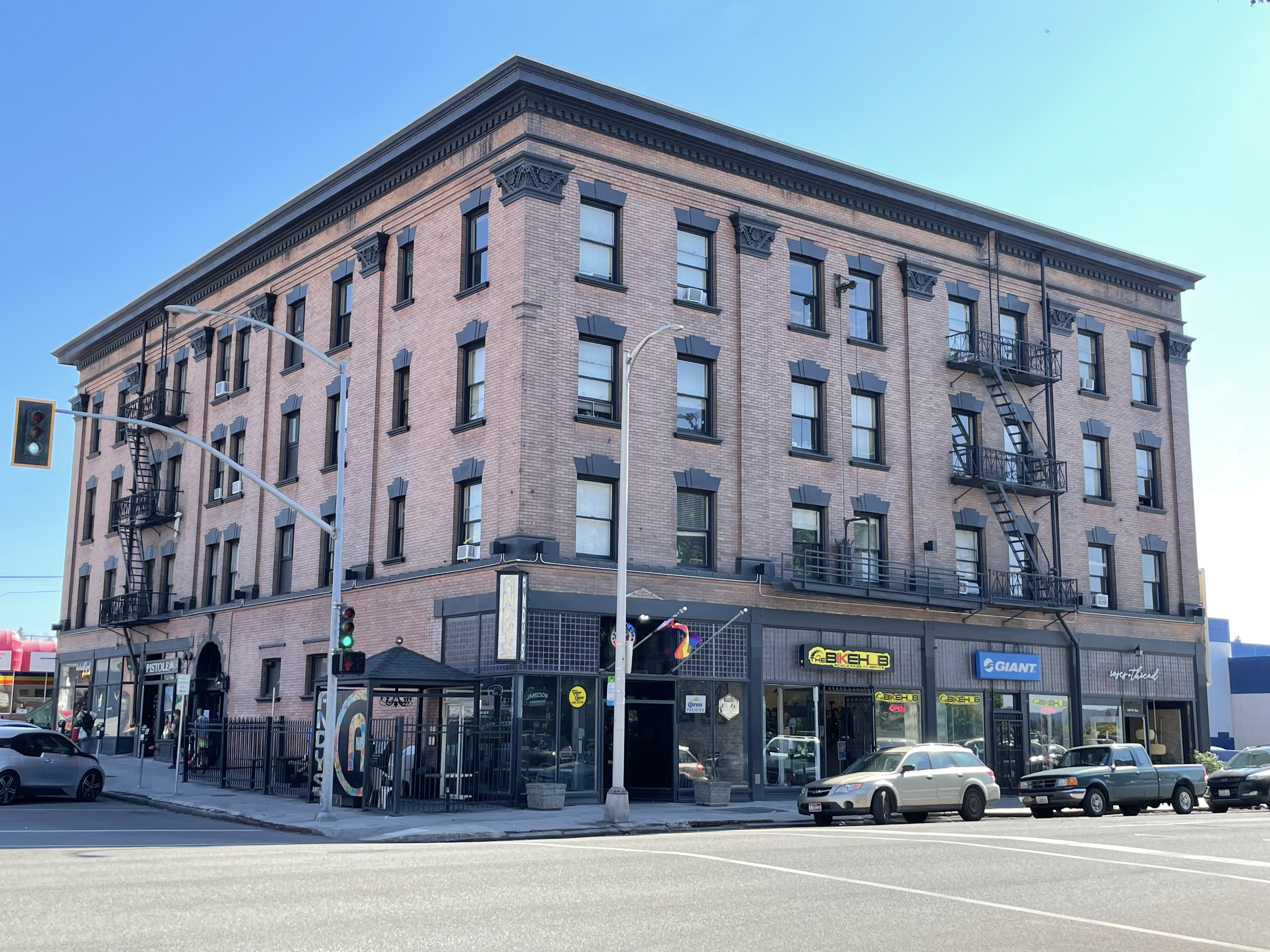
The Hotel Upton was once a single room occupancy (SRO)

The first "apartment houses", multifamily buildings designed for middle class renters, in the city appeared in the early 1900s. Previously hotels, lodging houses, and boarding houses were the only rentable living spaces available in the city and those accommodations catered predominantly to lower income, transient workers, whereas middle class families either owned or rented homes. Although the first example of the living arrangement was first introduced in New York in 1869, for middle class families, the idea of close living quarters and shared facilities was seen as a burden and unappealing and was slow to gain acceptance, however, the housing crisis in downtown Spokane, where land and space was growing more expensive made the idea of an apartment more desirable because they began to offer luxuries seen in hotels but with a smaller square footage and the convenience of living in the city. The early apartment styles in Spokane were typical of those in other cities, where the earliest offerings enticed tenants with privacy and urban living in a building with a familiar, domestic look that was reminiscent of a large single family home, and later progressed to residences with amenities seen in high-end hotels that maintain a residential look and feel that avoided the railroad apartment style that was common in tenements of the day by creating separate living and dining areas and finally to luxury suites in a boldly tall structure.

Some of the earliest apartment buildings in the city were pioneered by Albert Held, who was the architect behind the Amman, San Marco, Breslin, and Knickerbocker, which still exist today and were added to the National Register of Historic Places as the Apartment Buildings by Albert Held Thematic Group in 1987. This group of buildings are significant because they illustrate the evolution of apartment building design in Spokane. The Amman was built in 1904, and as possibly the first apartment built in Spokane, it typifies the first stage of apartment evolution, with its simple, rectangular and residential appearance and shingled hip roof with a simple interior, while the San Marco (built 1904) and Knickerbocker (built 1911) represent the intermediate stage of development when apartments were designed and looked like exclusive clubs, with highly ornamented façades and imposing entryway porticos along with a reception desk and elaborately designed interiors. The U-shaped and H-shaped buildings offer residents views of landscaped rear courtyards. Finally, the Breslin represents the last stage of early apartment development in Spokane. The six-story structure was built in 1910 and is much taller than the Amman at only one-half stories and is thought to be the tallest residential building built in Spokane prior to World War II. The Neoclassical Revival building has the appearance of a tall office building, with a cell-like repetition of paned glass windows.

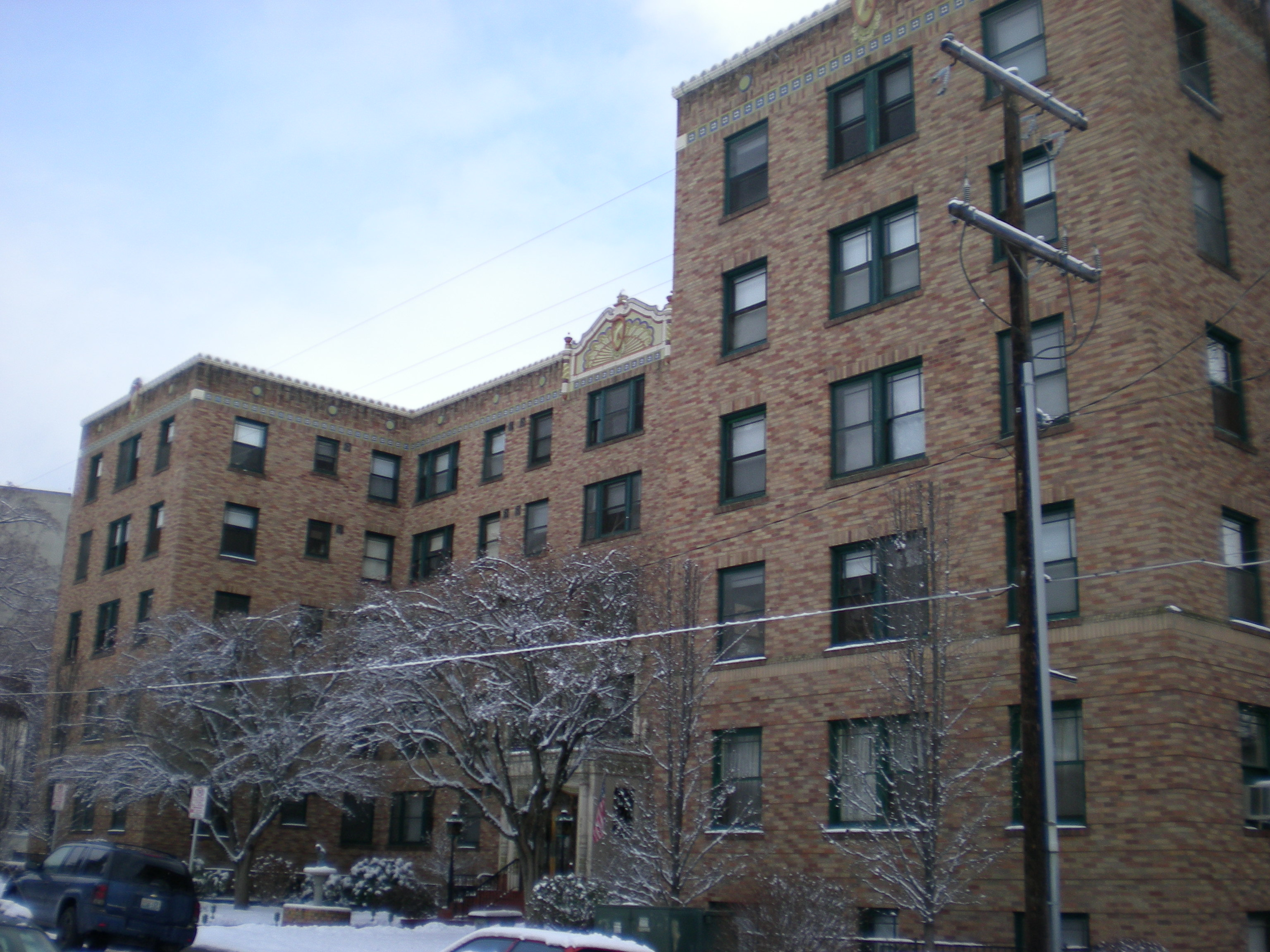
The luxurious Roosevelt Apartments built in 1929

The trend of building high luxury apartments with modern conveniences continued into the next decade. Post World War I, Spokane had a population of over 100,000 people and experienced a glut of high end apartment block construction in a wealthy portion of the Cliff/Cannon neighborhood along West Fifth, Sixth, Seventh, and Eighth Avenues. These units attracted aging "old wealth" residents who wished to downsize from maintaining a house and live care-free in an established mixed-use neighborhood close to public transportation and downtown. In many respects, the apartments built during the post World War I period differed very little from the earlier structures in form, height, scale, and method of construction, but architecturally, a trend toward modernism and a more streamlined look was emerging in buildings such as the NRHP-listed Roosevelt Apartments and the Culmstock Arms Apartments, both built in 1929, as opposed to the revivalist styles popular before. The focal point of the six-story apartment block is the central parapet with terra cotta embellishments and a massive "R/A" cartouche above its elaborate front entrance which has a balconette over mahogany-framed doors which are flanked by Corinthian columns and surrounded by Moorish elements and intricate brass filigree light fixtures. One of the most significant advances in apartment design at this time and present in the Roosevelt and Culmstock Arms Apartments was the inclusion of attached one-story automobile garages.

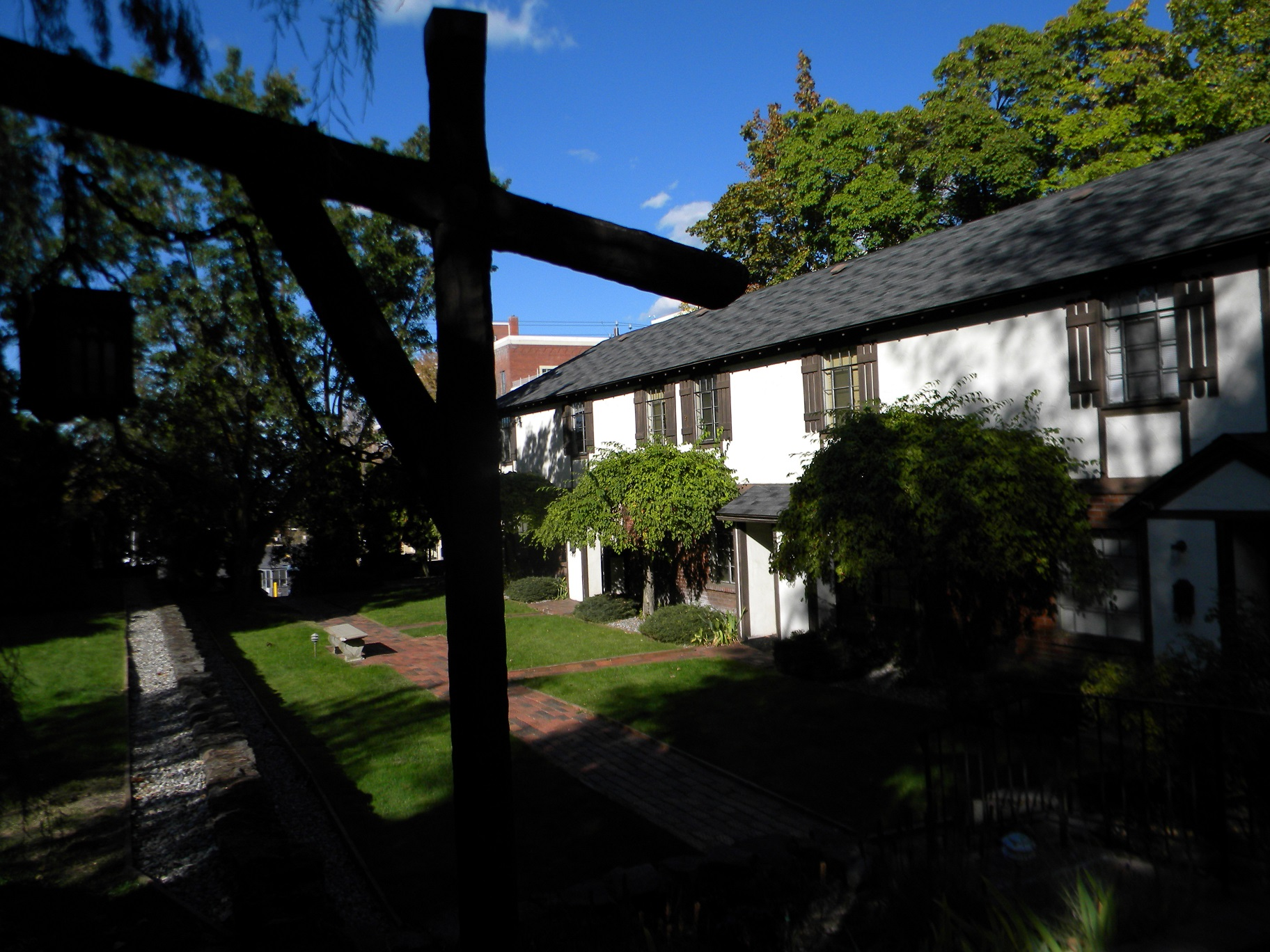
The Robinwood Apartments built in 1939 is a "motel apartment" featuring an attached garage, which had become a common offering at the time

In the 1930s, Spokane was growing and developing outward from the downtown and the surrounding neighborhoods. One example that typifies the apartments the 1930s and 1940s is the NRHP-listed Robinwoods Apartments, in the vicinity of W. Ninth Avenue and Grand Boulevard on what was known as the Fernhill Addition of Spokane's South Hill. Unlike the exclusive club-like apartments that were still popular in the 1920s, the Robinwood Apartments were not built in an established neighborhood on the periphery of downtown but in a suburban development on largely undeveloped land that was only home to pine trees, wild roses, and syringes. Built in 1939, the complex is representative of the typical domestic, multi-family architecture built during the 1930s to 1940s and catered to residents with professional or paraprofessional occupations. Built in the Tudor Revival style, the Robinwood Apartments is an example of a "motel apartment" and consists of two identical Tudor Revival style buildings with a prominent landscaped courtyard in between. The buildings are two stories with a shingled roof and red brick wall cladding and a first floor featuring a red brick veneer and a second floor with a dark brown-colored false half-timbering that contrasts with a crème colored stucco infill. The Robinwood has an attached covered garage available to each unit, which is accessible at-grade through the basement level on the terraced hillside; with the automobile being ubiquitous and replacing the streetcar, a garage had become a common offering for upscale apartments of the time. The courtyard is considered a defining feature of the apartment complex and is accessed via two brick staircases illuminated at night by wrought iron carriage-style light fixtures that lead to a walkway of brick pavers into a lawn and garden planted with coniferous and deciduous trees, shrubs, and flower beds.

The Mid-century Studio Apartment is an apartment block in the Cliff-Cannon neighborhood at the edge of downtown. Designed by the firm McClure & Adkison with Bruce Walker as the lead designer in 1948, the Mid-century Studio Apartment is significant as probably the first modernist buildings in the city with its efficiently designed block structure and wooden-framed side walls.

=== Bridges ===
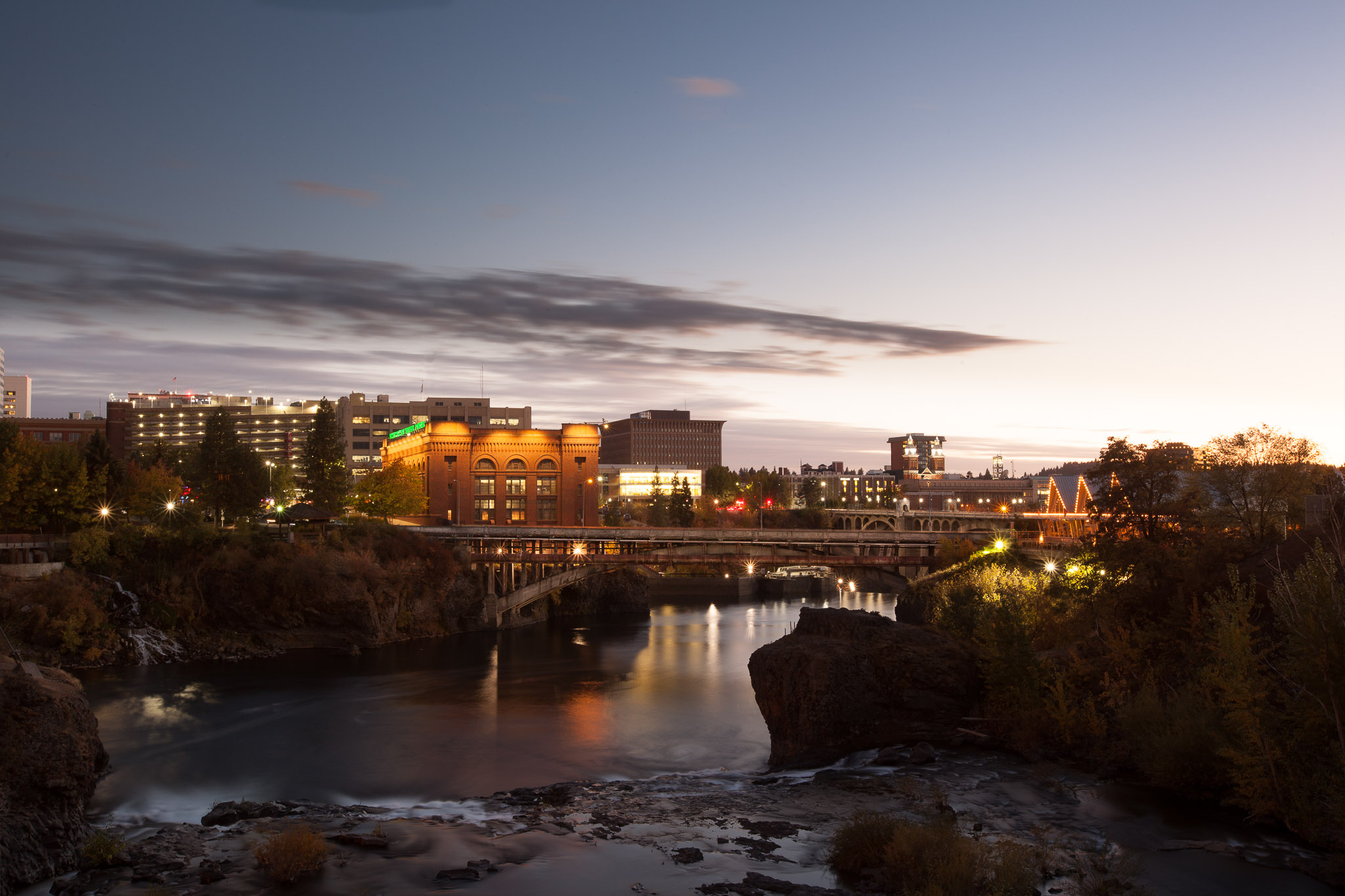
Bridges in downtown Spokane

Spokane has some architecturally notable bridges that were built to span a variety of obstacles and designed for various modes of transportation over the years. Many of these bridges were built to span the Spokane River during Spokane's early 20th century boom years and people once referred to Spokane as the "City of Bridges."

== Architects ==
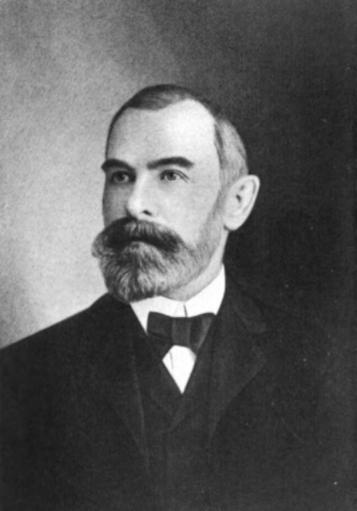
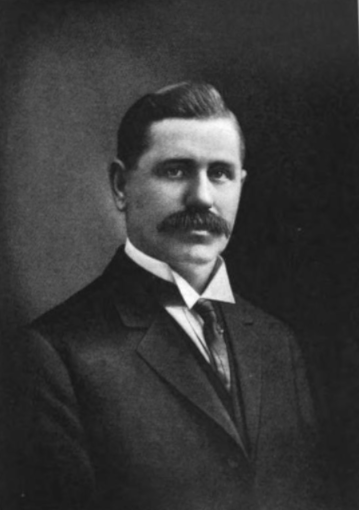
Herman Preusse and Julius Zittel of firm Preusse & Zittel

=== Early architects ===
In the defining years after the Great Fire of 1889, many lauded architects were working the Spokane area that helped the city breathlessly rebuild into its Age of Elegance. These notable architects include Albert Held, Archibald G. Rigg, John K. Dow, Herman Preusse, Julius Zittel, Loren L. Rand, William W. Hyslop, Willis Ritchie, Gustav Albin Pehrson, Harold C. Whitehouse, Kirtland Cutter, and Karl G. Malmgren. Kirtland Cutter and Karl Malmgren often worked together as partners in their firm, Cutter & Malmgren. Preusse and Zittel, both natives of Germany also worked together in a partnership.

Likely the first trained architect to practice in the city was Herman Preusse, a German immigrant who studied at the College of Architecture in Holzminden before moving to the United States in 1870 and eventually finding himself in Spokane in 1882. As a growing city recently connected to a Northern Pacific railroad line, Spokane officials retained Preusse to plan the design of buildings in the commercial district and help establish an image of Spokane as a progressive, and prosperous emerging city in the west. Although most of his buildings burned up in the Great Fire of 1889, he remained productive and had more building contracts than any other architect in the city following the fire. Some of his most notable surviving works were for the Jesuits at Gonzaga College, where he was hired to do all of their architectural work and was willing to accept land as payment for it. Preusse is known for designing Gonzaga's St. Aloysius Catholic Church, Carnegie Library, Peyton Building, and Fernwell Building.

==== Kirtland Cutter ====
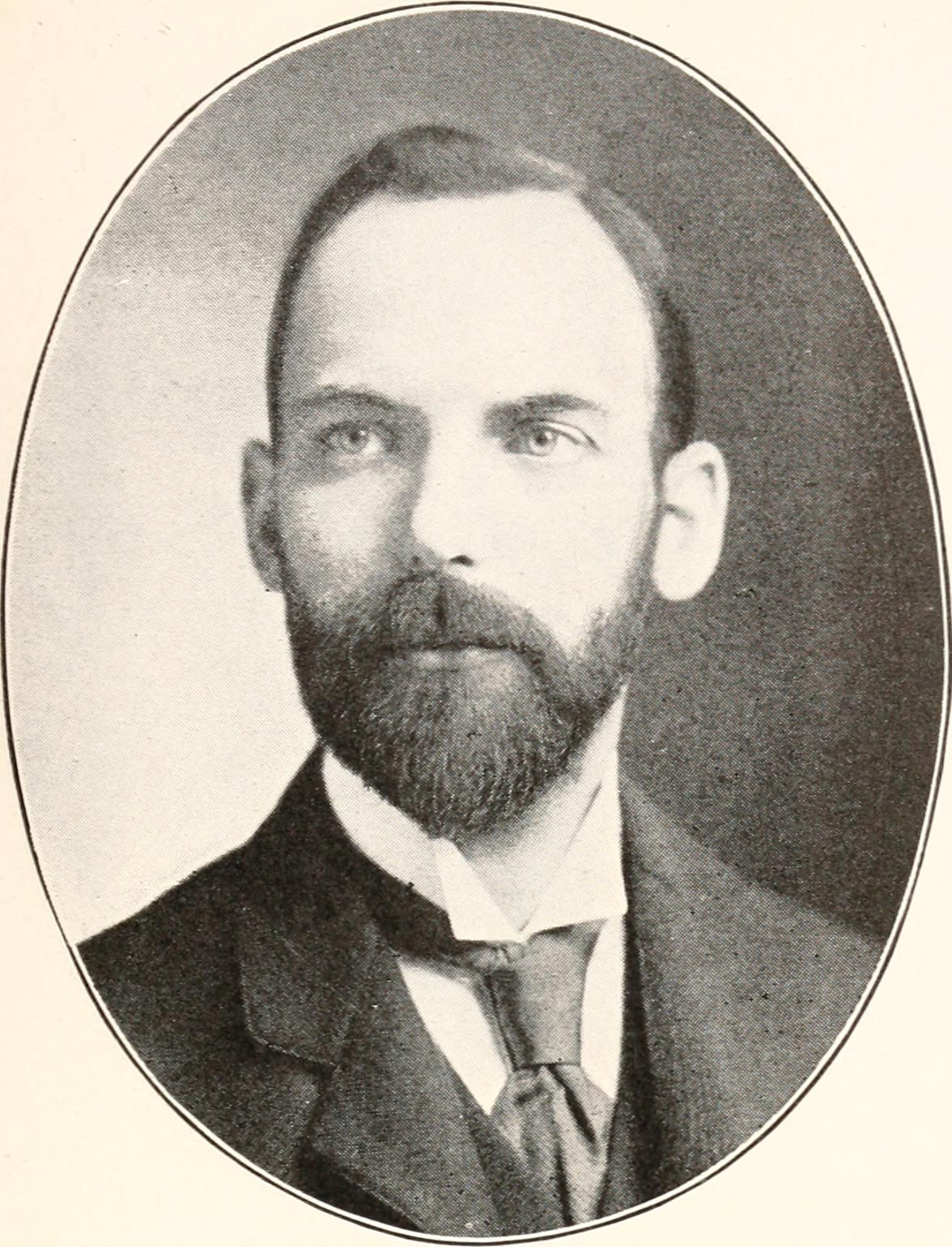
Kirtland Cutter

The principal architect of many buildings of this period is associated with Kirtland Cutter and his partner, Karl Malmgren as part of the Cutter & Malmgren firm. Cutter, a self-taught architect, spent much of his career working in Spokane and has become the most identifiable figure with early Spokane architecture scene and is credited in large part with giving the city its distinctive character with his "rare architectural force and genius for design". Structures designed by Cutter include the Spokane Club, Washington Water Power Post Street Electric Substation, the architectural embellishments on the Monroe Street Bridge (featured in the city seal), Central Steam Heat Plant, and the Davenport Hotel. In high demand following his firms' design of the Idaho Building at the Chicago World's Fair in 1893, Cutter found work constructing many mansions for mining and railroad magnates such as Patrick "Patsy" Clark and Daniel C. Corbin and son, Austin. Kirtland Cutter gained a reputation of being an architect retained by the very wealthy, which allowed Cutter the freedom to spare no expense with his creations. Arguably his most well known work is the Davenport Hotel. Built lavishly in the Renaissance Revival and Spanish Revival style, the Davenport Hotel cost two million dollars to complete and included new technologies at the time of its opening in September 1914, such as chilled water, elevators, and air cooling. The ornate hotel lobby has been referred to as "Spokane's living room", and in a 1921 edition of The Architect and Engineer the lobby was applauded by the author stating, there are "few if any finer lobbies in America".

=== Mid-century architects and the modernist movement ===
Mid-century modern architecture in Spokane

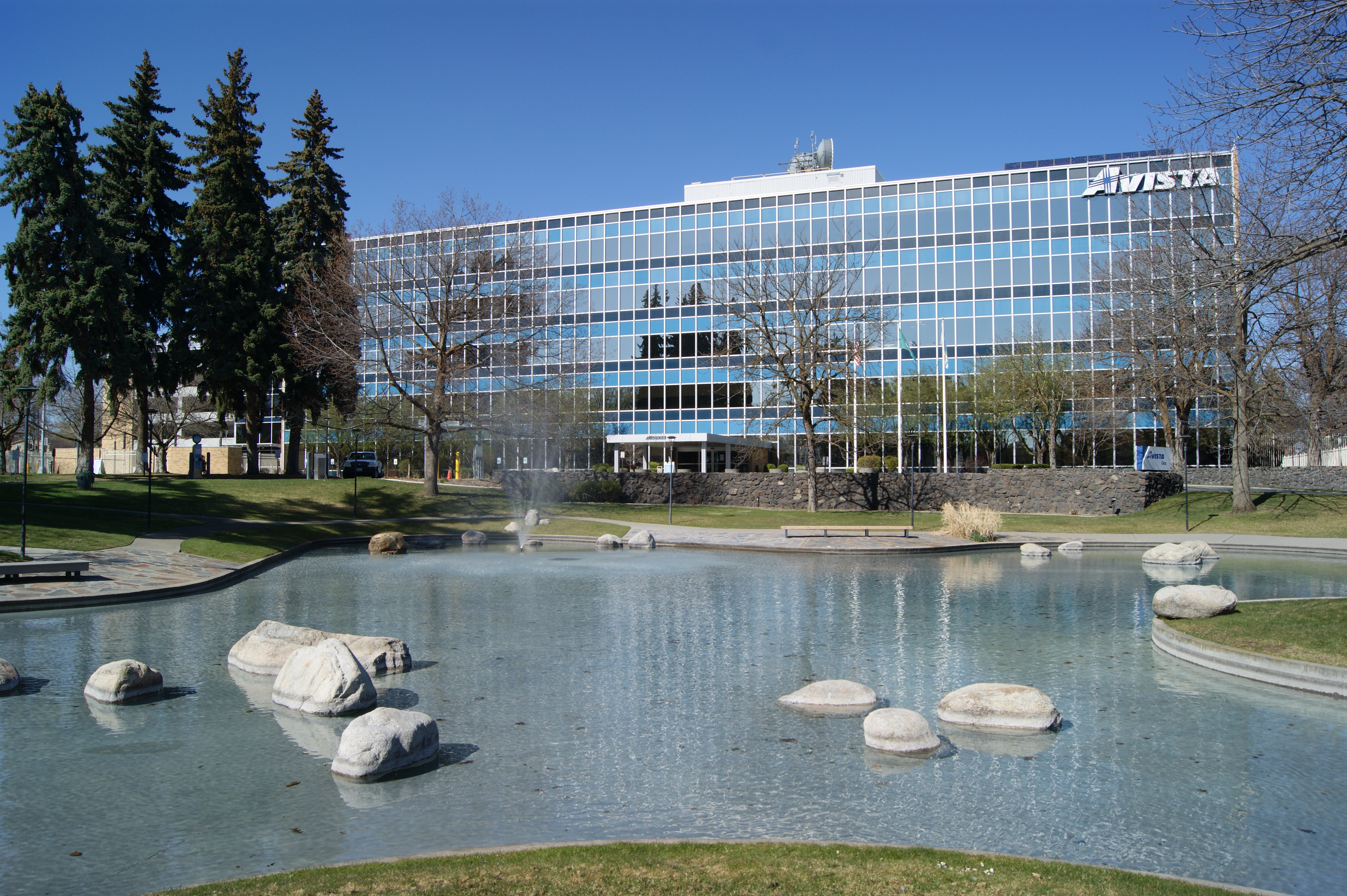
The Avista building designed by Brooks & Walker, 1958, was deemed one of the five best built in the US in 1959 by the AIA

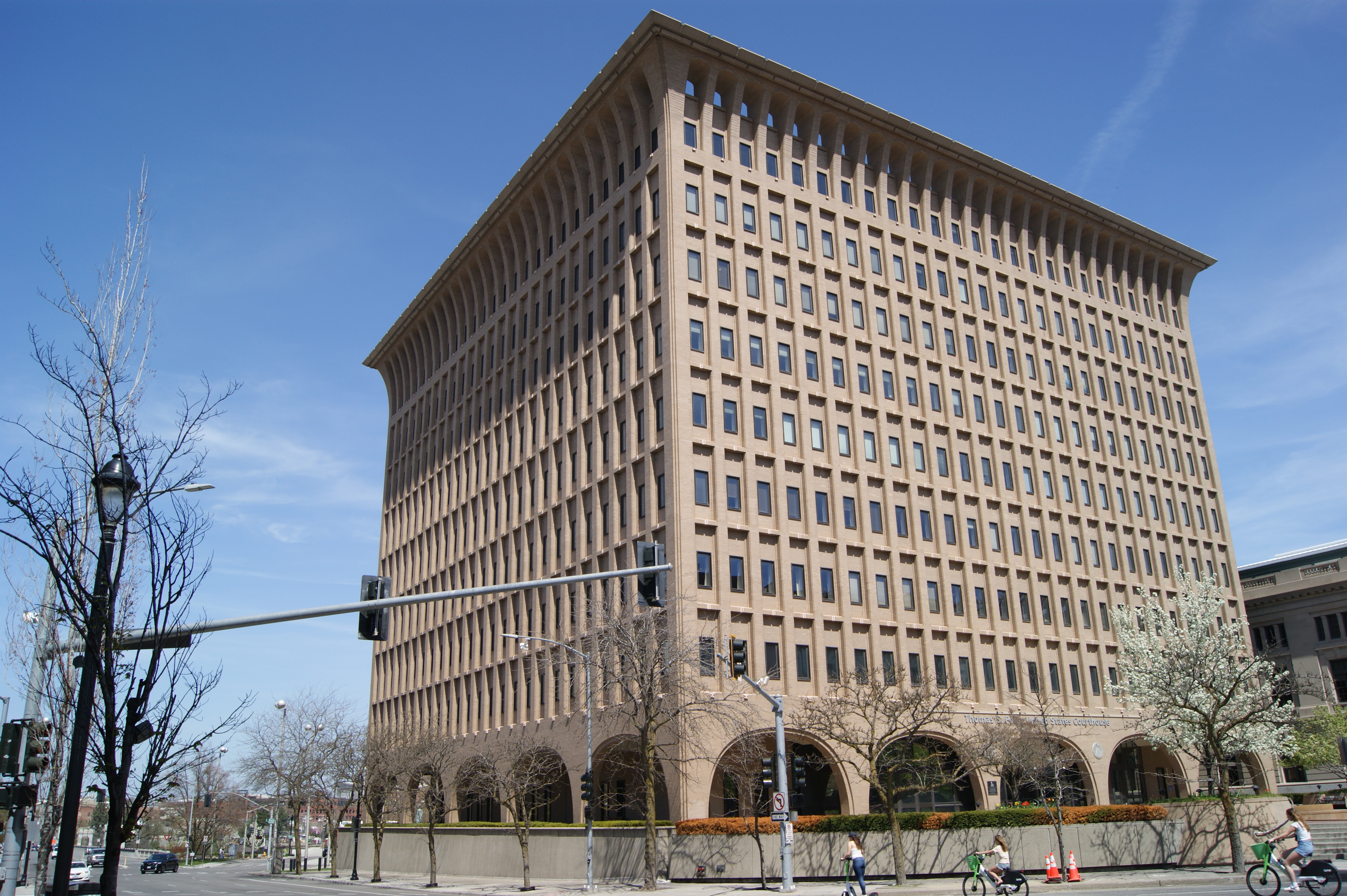
Thomas S. Foley U.S. Courthouse, designed by the firms Culler, Gale, Martell & Ericson and McClure & Adkison and Walker & McGough, 1967

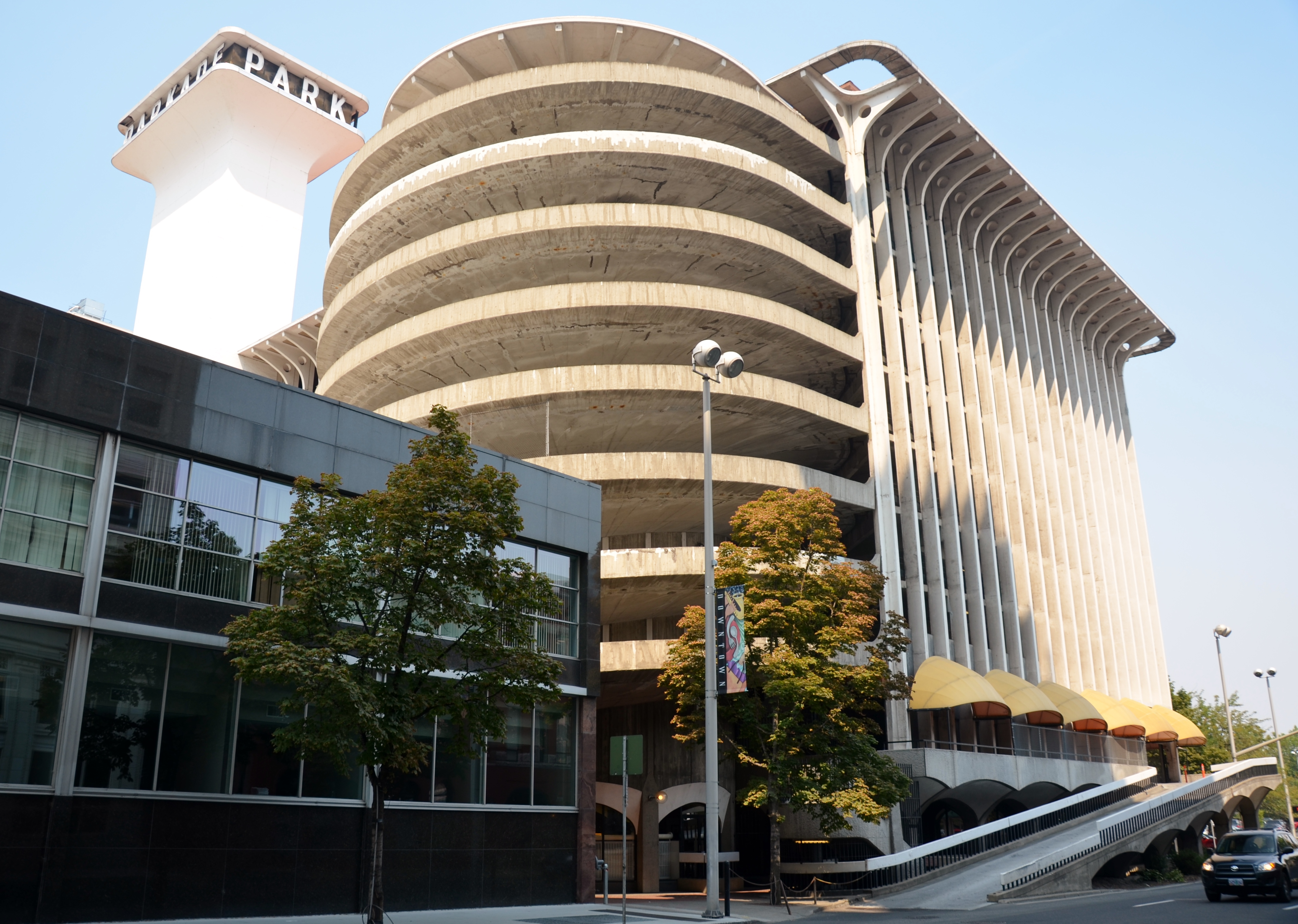
The Parkade designed by Warren C. Heylman, 1967

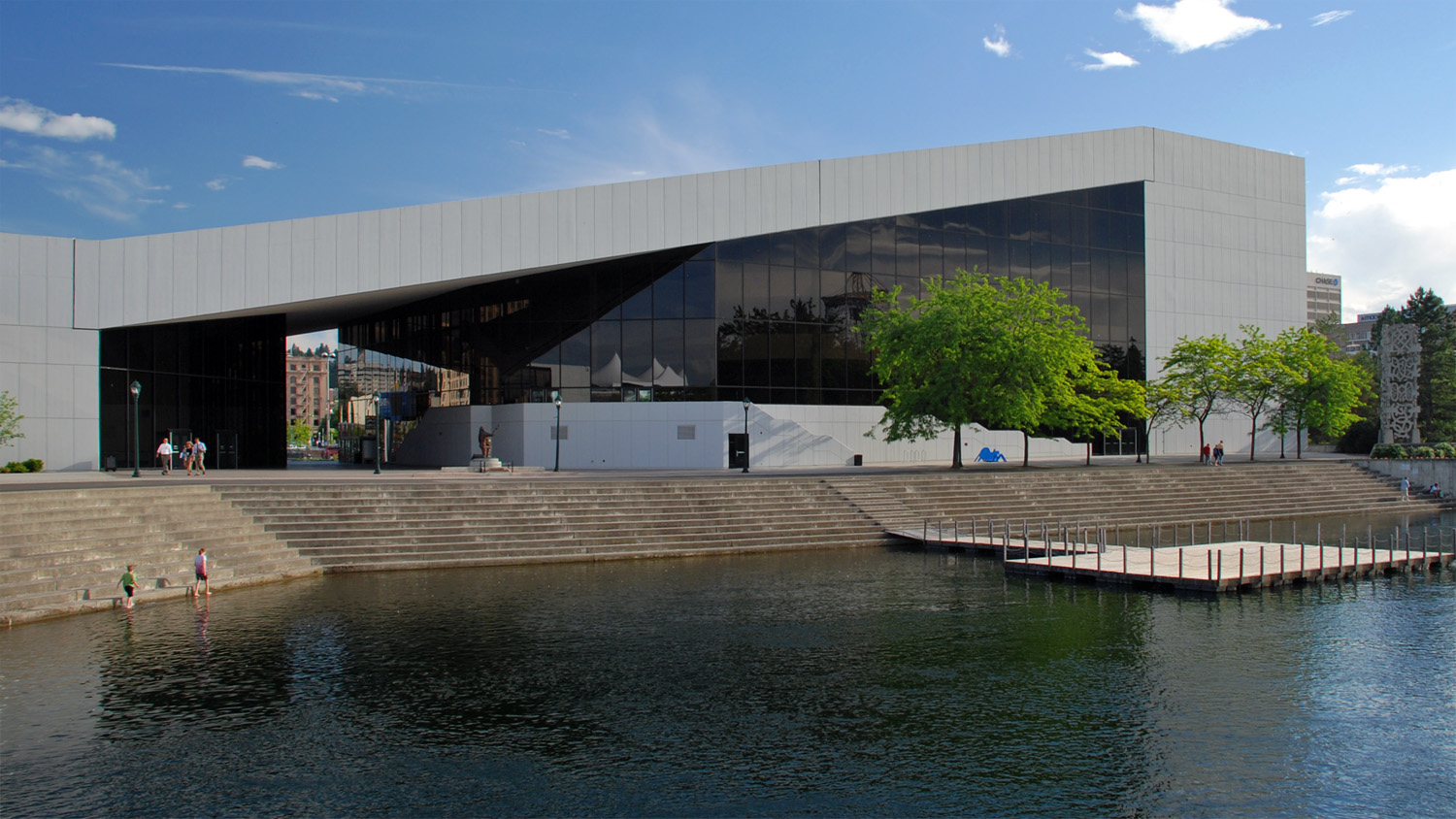
First Interstate Center for the Arts designed by Walker & McGough, 1974

After World War II, a construction boom gave a platform and work to a new generation of Spokane architects that were associated with the modern architecture movement and is thought to have begun when the architect Kenneth W. Brooks arrived in the city in 1948. Brooks was employed at Skidmore, Owings & Merrill before moving to Spokane. Other notable architects during this period include Bruce M. Walker, John McGough, Royal McClure, Thomas R. Adkison, William "Bill" Trogdon, and Warren C. Heylman. Royal McClure is distinguished for having studied under pioneering modernist Walter Gropius at Harvard University. For the most part, the portfolio of this handful of productive architects and their partnerships' work eventually gained recognition nationally, receiving national awards, being featured in industry journals and consumer magazines, once again brought attention to the city's architecture scene and changed the face of the city. The modernist movement deliberately and disruptively broke away from the architectural styles of the past and embraced functionalism and rationalism and used new and innovative materials and construction methods. Modernist architecture encompasses a variety of styles but is broadly characterized by its place in time-post World War II era architecture in the 20th century and the aesthetic associated with it, characterized by the experimental and progressive trends in materials or construction. Modernist architecture eschewed the excessive ornamentation and embellishments that came before in favor of simplicity in design and form, highlighting horizontal and vertical lines and exposing construction materials such as wood and stone to complement a structures natural surroundings.

Notable buildings constructed in this period include the Brutalist style Spokane Civic Theatre and Temple Beth Shalom, the Googie style Dick's Hamburgers, and Shadle Park Reservoir, the Neo-expressionist style Sacred Heart Catholic Church, and the original portions of the Spokane International Airport and Concourses A and B, and the New Formalist style Thomas S. Foley U.S. Courthouse, and The Parkade parking garage. Among the most lauded buildings of this era of architecture in Spokane is the Washington Water Power Central Service Facility (Avista headquarters building) situated on a 28-acre (0.11 km^{2}) suburban campus on the banks of the Spokane River. The building was designed by Brooks & Walker in 1958 using the then-popular curtain wall construction, where panels or spandrels are attached to a non-structural framework on the outside of the building, which is meant to bring more light into the interior spaces. Also working on the project was Spokane artist Harold Balazs and San Francisco-based Lawrence Halprin doing the landscape architecture. The building was featured in the magazine Architectural Record and received a First Honor Award by the American Institute of Architects (AIA), deeming it to be one of the five best buildings built in the country in 1959.

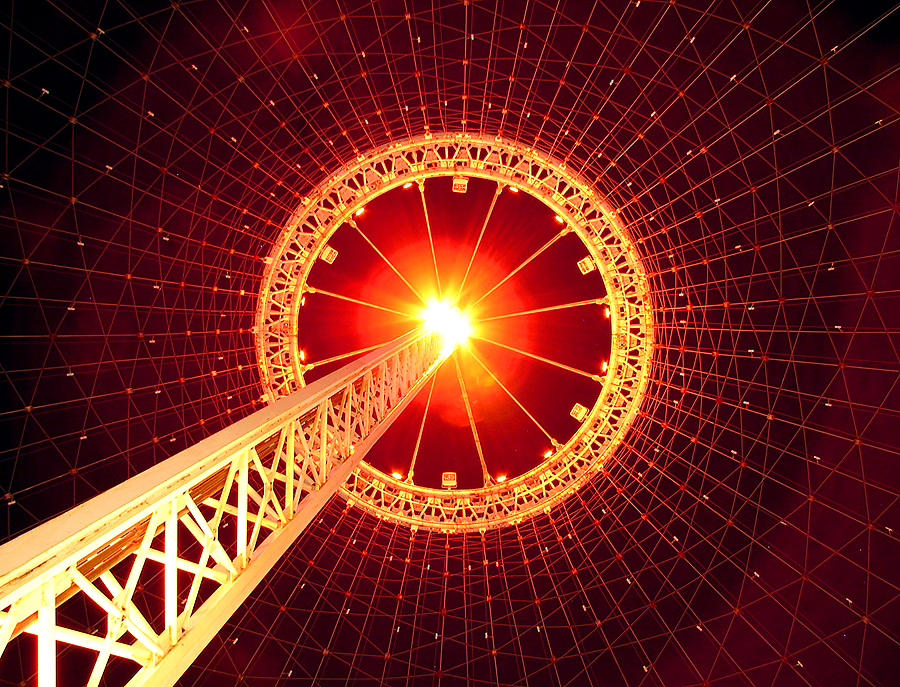
The US Pavilion in Riverfront Park

Some of the most prominent examples of modernist architecture came as a result of the preparations for the environmentally-themed Expo '74 World's Fair in what is now Riverfront Park. The modernist architects in Spokane, especially Kenneth Brooks, were keenly aware of the need for urban renewal downtown and "reclaiming the falls" and were active in the groups that shaped the developments that led up to Expo '74. The Fair design was largely the work of Tom Adkison and the firm Trogdon, Smith, and Grossmann and the most significant legacy structures of the fair, the Spokane Convention Center and First Interstate Center for the Arts were designed by Walker & McGough. Adkison, as executive architect was responsible for the overall development of the site while other architects were responsible for the exhibition structures. The environmental theme led to a minimalist design and construction with recycling in mind. After a request for proposal, the final contract to design the recognizable U.S. Pavilion was awarded to Seattle-based architecture firm Naramore, Bain, Brady & Johanson, now known as NBBJ. The building featured a soft shell canopy over a courtyard and a theater, with the translucent roof providing the building with natural light and fresh air. The design of the pavilion was described by the U. S. Department of Commerce as "an expression of environmental concern ... [with the] structure's smooth, graceful contour harmonized fully with the surrounding shoreline terrain". In the 2016 redevelopment and modernization of Riverfront Park, Olson Kundig Architects was contracted to conceptualize the design of the new structures and grounds, paying homage to the fairs original themes; one of the principal architects of the firm, Tom Kundig, was raised in Spokane and is the son of architect Moritz Kundig, who had a leading role in the firm who did the design of the same grounds to prepare for Expo '74.

In 2016, a study was conducted partly funded through a grant by the National Park Service and Washington State Department of Archaeology and Historic Preservation to document examples of the modernist movement in the city and help understand why it flourished in Spokane. The study counted 53 never before inventoried structures built by 27 architects from 1948 to 1973, of which 16 are commercial buildings, 13 are institutional, and 24 are residences. Some of the partnerships and firms created by the Spokane area modernists survive today in some form through mergers, such as NAC Architecture, Integrus Architecture, and ALSC Architects.

==== Warren C. Heylman ====
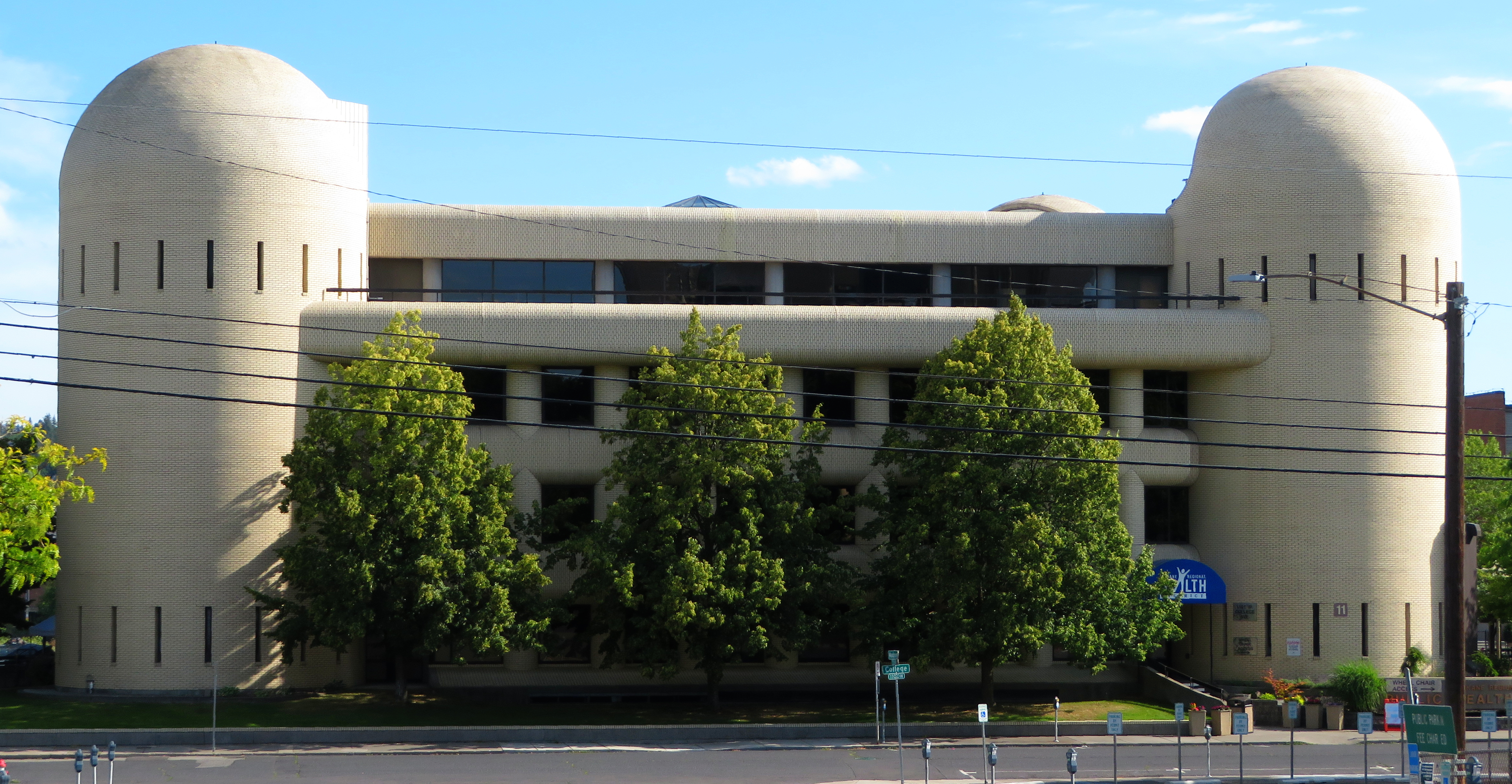
Spokane Regional Health District Building

Warren C. Heylman is considered one of the city's foremost and influential architects in contemporary times and is credited with giving the city a great breadth of mid-century architecture. A native of Spokane, after studying engineering at the University of Kansas, he returned to Spokane to briefly work for G.A. Pehrson and Whitehouse & Price before starting his own firm in 1952. Heylman's career was most prolific during the 1960s and 1970s, where his main body of work was designing numerous residential houses, apartment buildings, and architectural embellishments. During Expo '74, Warren designed all of the international exhibition structures with the exception of the Chinese Pavilion. Some of his most noteworthy works in Spokane include The Parkade, Spokane International Airport, Spokane Regional Health Building, Cathedral Plaza, Riverfalls Tower, and the Burlington Northern Latah Creek Bridge over Hangman Valley. Before retiring in 1984, he received six AIA awards, a Concrete Institute Award (for the Parkade), and was inducted into the American Institute of Architects College of Fellows in 1983. The Riverfalls Tower was the first Heylman building in the city to be listed on the local historic register in 2021, listed two years before reaching the usual 50-year mimumum age guideline so the 98-year old Heylman could appreciate the event.

== Historic preservation ==
Example of Adaptive reuse
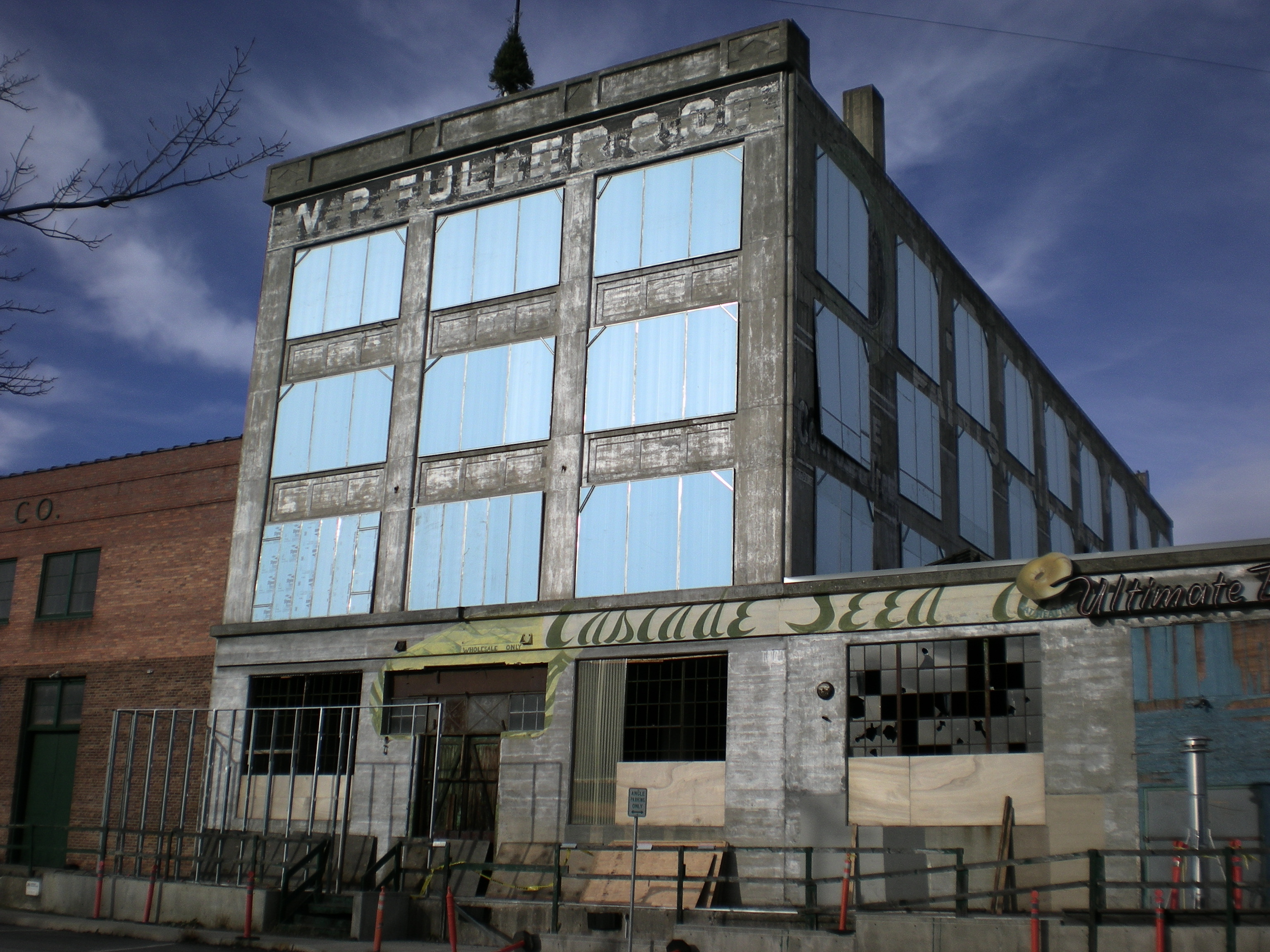
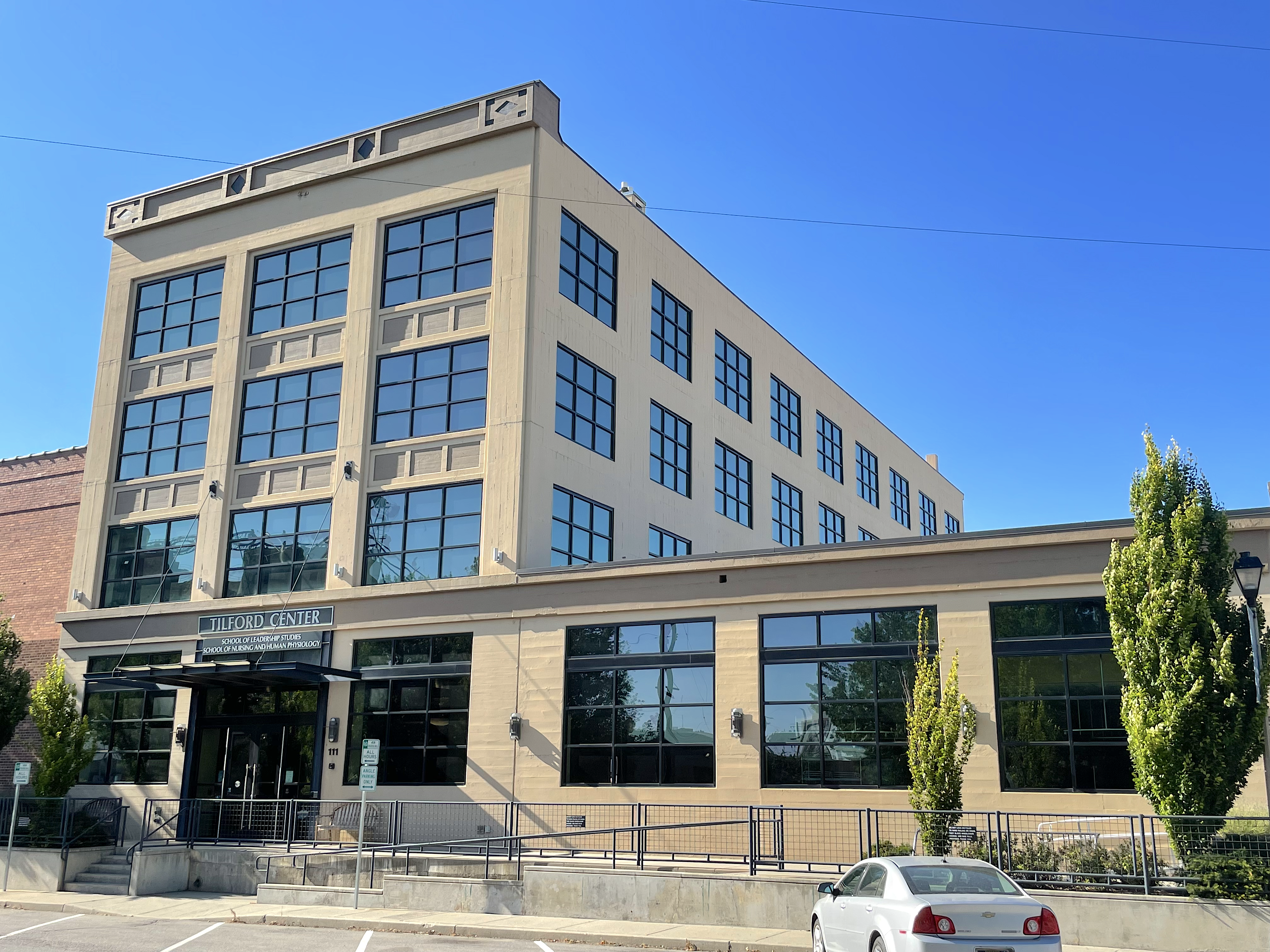
The W.P. Fuller and Company Warehouse was listed on the NRHP in 1996 and is a contributing property in the Desmet Avenue Warehouse Historic District

Since the revitalization of Spokane's historic downtown core at the beginning of the 21st century after decades of suburbanization and losing foot-traffic to the suburbs where there was easy, plentiful parking, there has been renewed interest in the center of the city as a destination. There are three National Register Historic Districts downtown and about half the buildings are designated as historic. Some buildings during the decline amidst suburbanization were demolished simply to make way for parking lots for businesses.

Attitudes appreciative to historic preservation have been growing among some developers, moving more toward attempting to renovate, reuse or repurpose historic and architecturally significant buildings, and big successes came with the renovations of the Davenport Hotel in 2002 and the Fox Theater in 2007, both of which were under threat of demolition; the site of the Fox Theater was to become a parking garage.

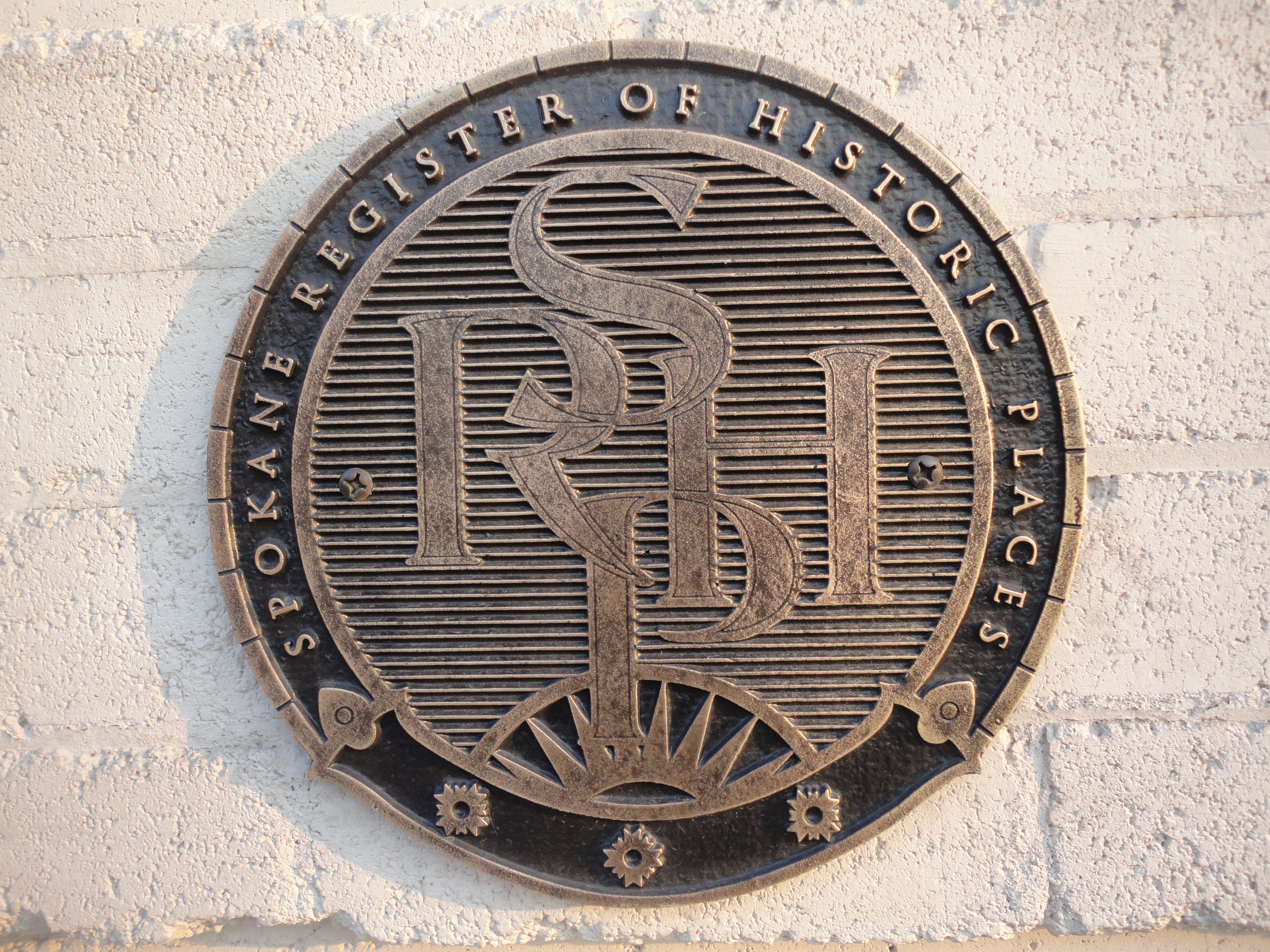
Spokane's Historic Register seal

Some historic buildings still have been lost to the wrecking ball however. A building that had a noticeable impact for preservation advocates and the community was the demolition of the Rookery Block in 2006 to make way for a potential office high-rise; the Rookery Block to some developers was deemed not economical to renovate, but some in the community saw it as architecturally interesting and worthy of being saved. The Rookery was demolished and today (as of January 2022) is still a public surface parking lot. Although a loss for preservationists, the situation was able to be used to lobby the city council to adopt an ordinance that prohibits the demolition of "historically eligible" buildings without erecting another structure in their place. A nomination was prepared for the Rookery Block, which originally consisted of three buildings, but it was demolished before it could be submitted.

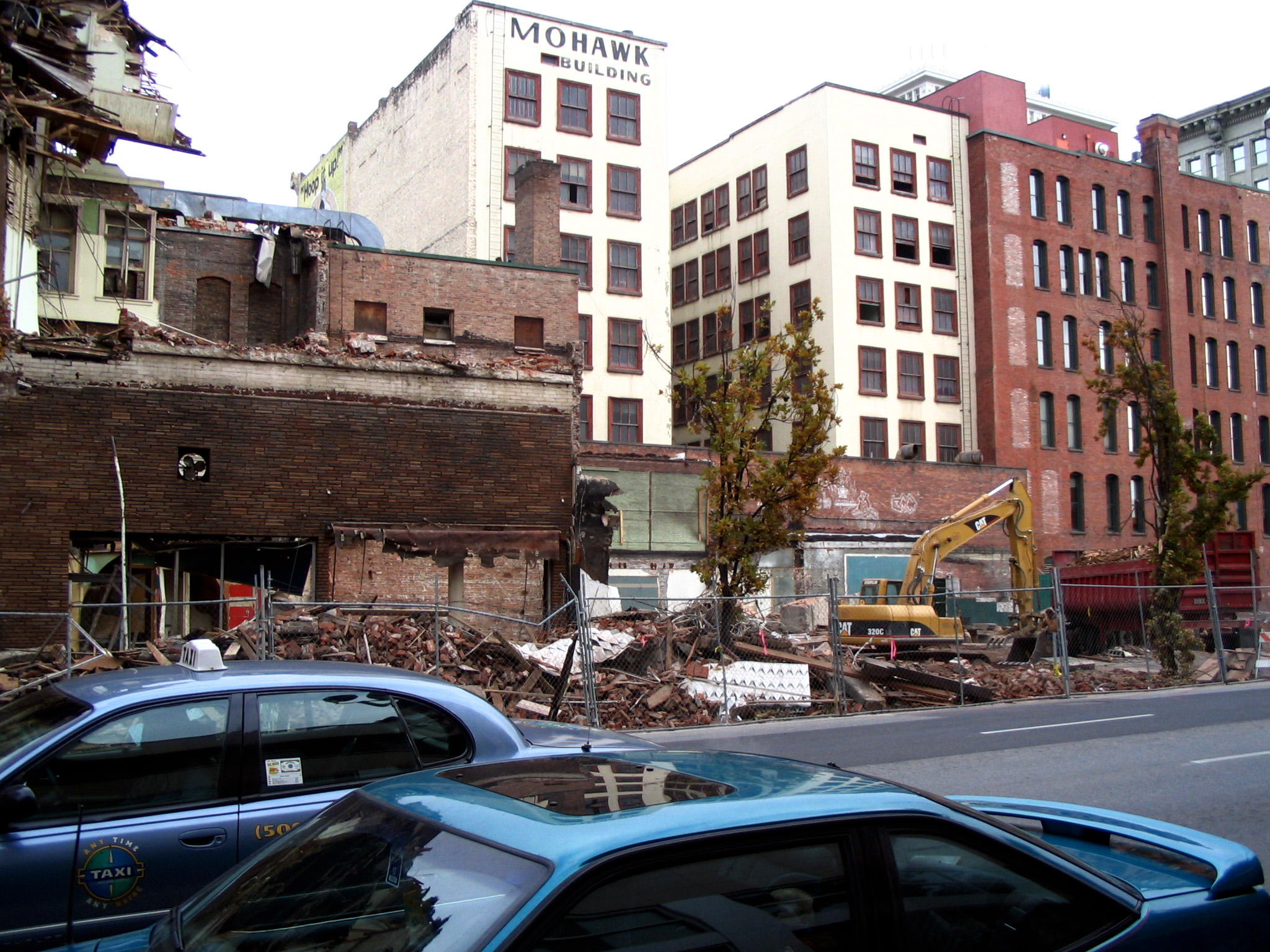
The demolition of the Rookery, Merton, and Mohawk buildings

Locally, eligible historic residential properties can apply to be listed on the Spokane Register of Historic Properties, which would make a property eligible for a federal tax credit toward necessary maintenance of the house; the register has over 400 listings (as of August 2021), most of which are residential homes. The Spokane Historic Preservation Office can offer support with the involved process of applying for the register and offer ideas and feedback when renovating a historic property, the Spokane Public Library's Northwest Room can also be used as a resource for finding relevant information regarding public records, newspapers, and neighborhood history in this process.

=== Most Endangered Places ===
The Washington Trust for Historic Preservation keeps a "Most Endangered Places" list for historic structures that are believed to be threatened with demolition. In Spokane County, there are currently (as of January 2022) two buildings on the list, the Jensen-Byrd Building and the Chancery Building. The Jensen-Byrd Building in the University District is a former warehouse designed by Whitehouse & Price with low ceilings which poses unique challenges for adaptive reuse and the Chancery Building is a Kirtland Cutter building that is a contributing property in the Riverside Avenue Historic District, which had its tenant vacated in 2019 to make way for an apartment building.

== Landscape architecture ==
Landscape architecture in Spokane

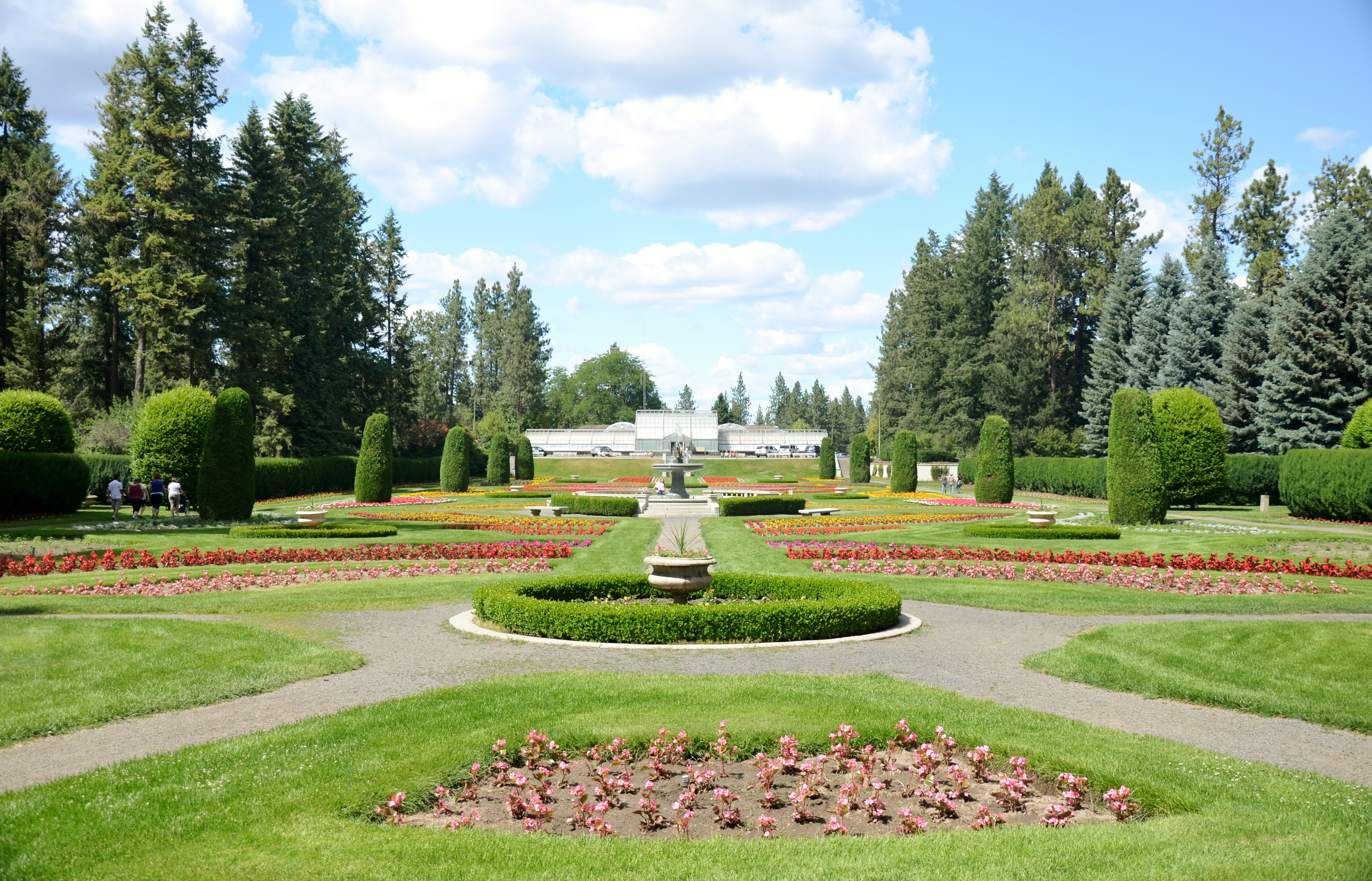
European style Duncan Gardens at Manito Park

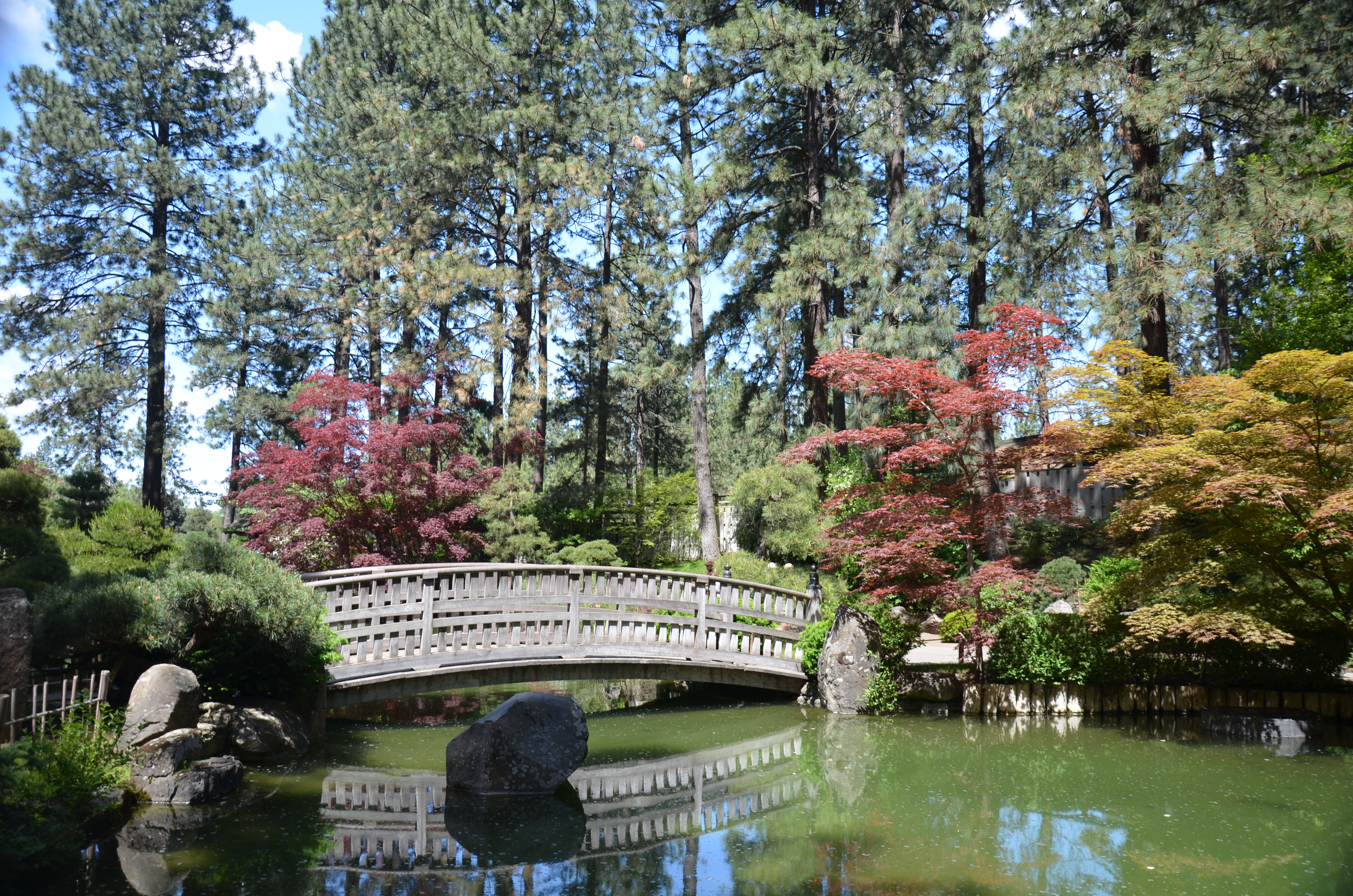
Nishinomiya Tsutakawa Japanese Garden at Manito Park

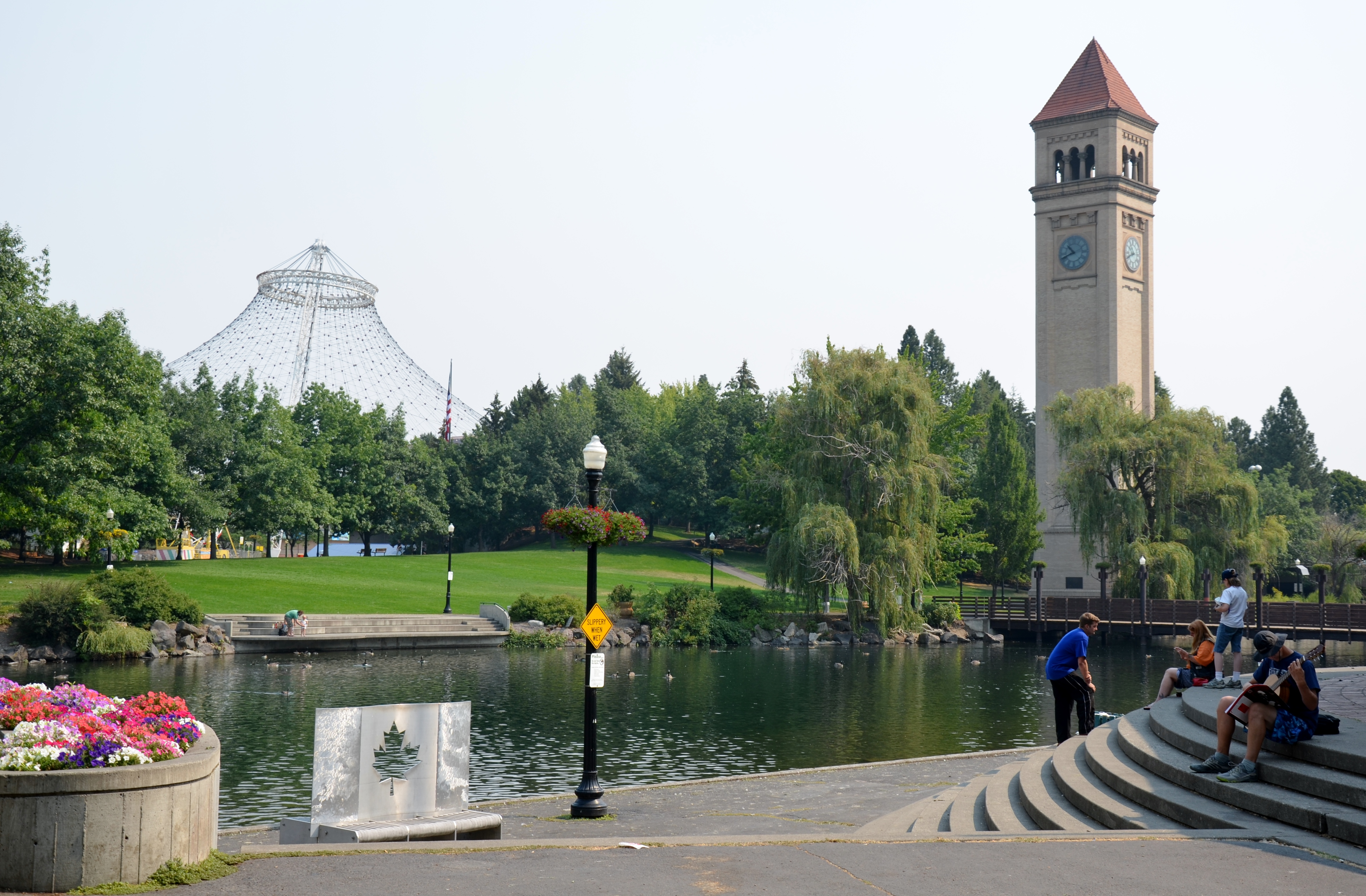
Riverfront Park

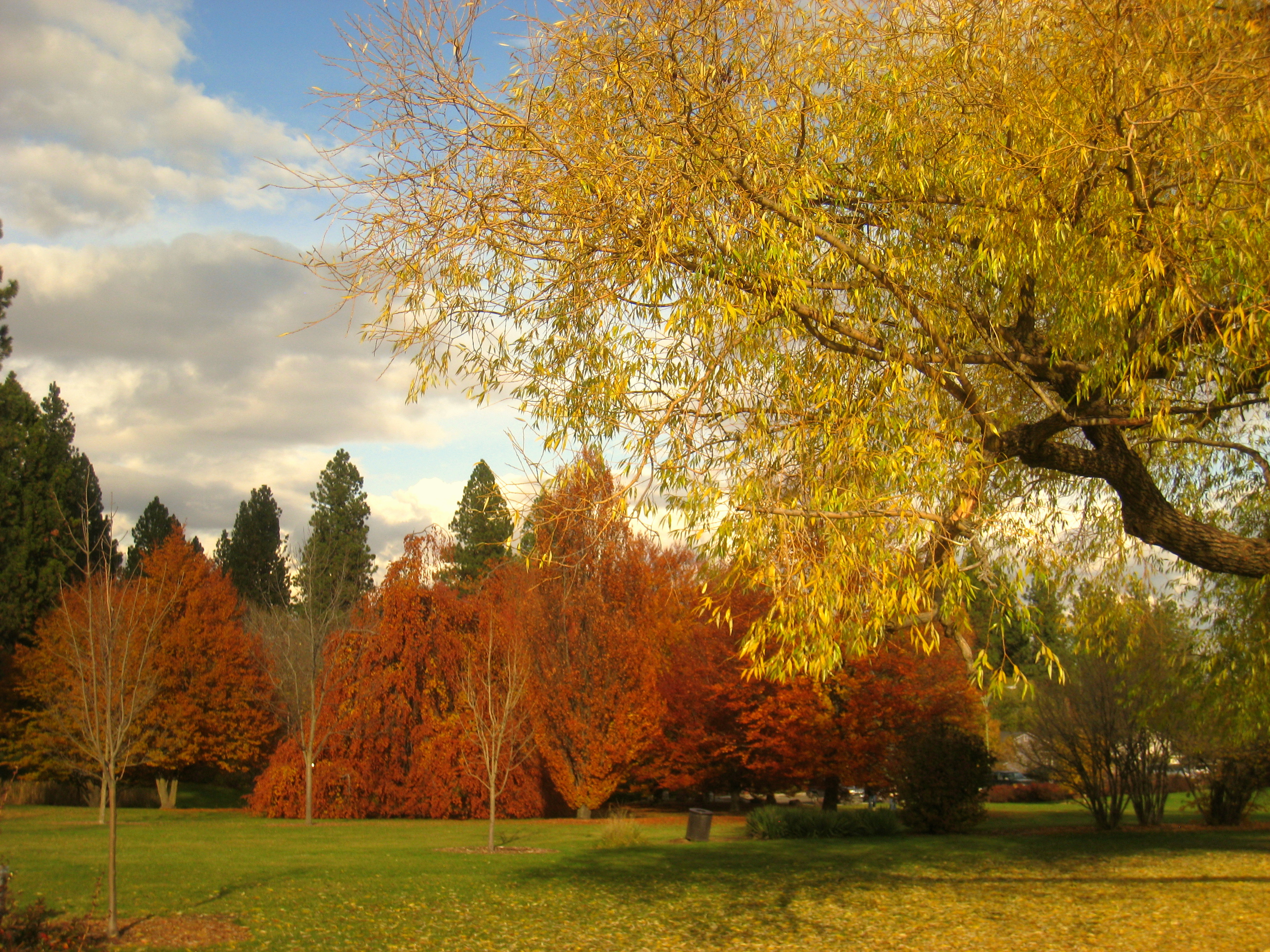
John A. Finch Arboretum

=== Parks ===
The Spokane Parks and Recreation Department has 4,100-acre (17 km^{2}) of parkland (as of February 2022) on 87 parks in total. Spokane's park system is ranked 17th in the country (as of 2022) based on its ParkScore Index, a ranking methodology by the Trust for Public Land which derives its score from five metrics: acreage, investment, amenities, access, and equity.

From very early on, the city had high ambitions for its park system. Hoping to make the city into a leader in modern park planning, the first city Park Board president, Aubrey White, hired the nations' foremost landscape architecture firm, the Olmsted Brothers to design the nascent park system in 1907. Aubrey saw and admired the City Beautiful movement and the work of the Olmsteds on the East Coast (who most famously designed Central Park in New York City) and wanted to plan ahead to avoid the ill effects of rapid industrialization on a future park system. Aubrey opted to swiftly and preemptively acquire land while it was cheap and before the city expanded and it could be used for future private development. The Olmsteds toured the city and its landscapes and delivered a report in 1908 that ambitiously proposed major improvements to the city's existing parks (like Manito Park, Corbin Park, Adams Park/Cannon Hill Park, and Liberty Park) as well as four large parks, five smaller parks, and 11 playfields. The plan was modeled after similar ones the firm had drawn up for Seattle and Portland. Aubrey and other members of the parks commission envisioned turning Spokane into a "City of Parks", with a comprehensive and cohesive park system, and thus implemented the entirety of the Olmsted Brothers plan for the whole city. The plan was implemented with the narrow passage of a $1 million ($33.7 million in 2024 dollars) bond by 18 votes in 1910 and parks such as John A. Finch Arboretum, High Bridge Park, and Downriver Park are a result of the Olmsteds recommendations that were in the Olmsted Report revealed in 1913. The legacy that the Olmsted Brothers had on the city park system and their philosophy continue to be revisited by the city Parks and Recreation Department today.

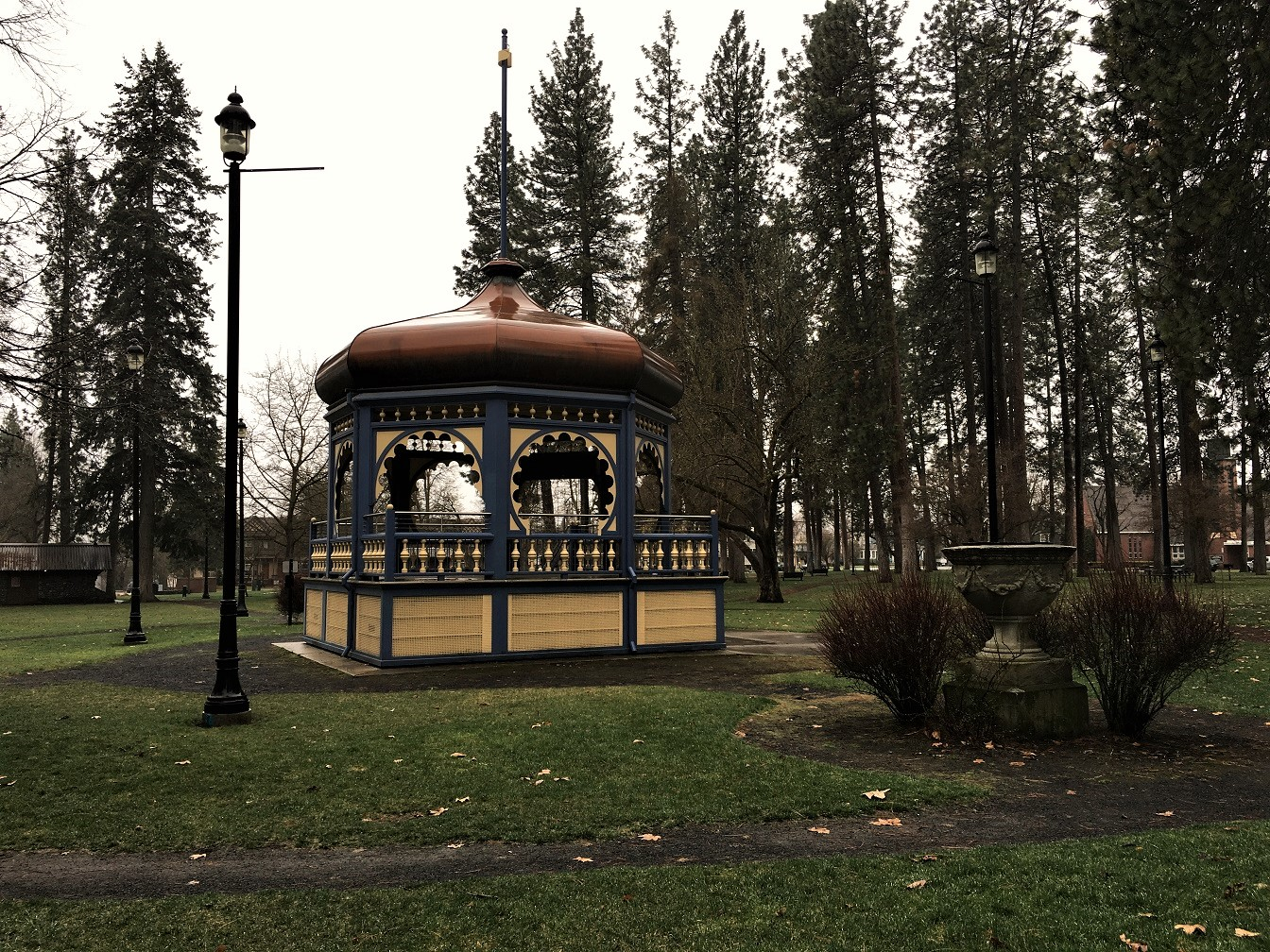
Coeur d'Alene Park bandstand and flowerpot

As the Olmsteds envisioned, the city did eventually "come to its senses" and reclaim the downtown riverfront and falls for a park, Riverfront Park, following Expo '74. Post Expo '74, the contract to convert the site to a park was awarded to the landscape architecture firm Robert Perron and Associates. Perron sought to accentuate the site's natural features such as the upper and lower falls by using observation points that were previously occupied by industrial buildings and warehouses, train tracks, and parking lots. Flowing footpaths connect the various sites and follow the terraformed landscape, revealing elements and viewpoints around the edges of the park, at the center of which is a natural amphitheater. The more developed southern edge of the park adjacent to the downtown central business district features the more artificial and manicured elements of the park, such as green spaces, fountains, and pools while the northern edge retains a more rugged aesthetic that more closely resembles the appearance of the natural environment.

Prior to Riverfront Park, the primary community park for the city of Spokane for most of the last century has been Manito Park on the South Hill; originally called Montrose Park, the site had seen recreational use since 1886 and by 1904 when it was officially dedicated, it had obtained its present name which means "Spirit of Nature" in Algonquian. The park has a mirror pond, five distinct gardens, including the European style Duncan Gardens and Nishinomiya Tsutakawa Japanese Garden in addition to the Joel E. Ferris Perennial Garden, Lilac Garden, and Rose Hill as well as a conservatory, the Gaiser Conservatory. The 3-acre (0.012 km^{2}) symmetrical Duncan Gardens, designed by John Duncan and redesigned some by the Olmsted Brothers, features a granite fountain and gazebo and the beds are changed seasonally. The Nishinomiya Tsutakawa Japanese Garden is named for Spokane's Japanese sister city, Nishinomiya and Ed Tsutakawa, the local man who campaigned for the twinning relationship; the garden was designed by landscape architect Nagao Sakurai in 1967, who had once maintained the grounds of the Tokyo Imperial Palace and contains a waterfall, pond and bridge. The park was placed on the National Register of Historic Places in 2015.

=== Parkways ===
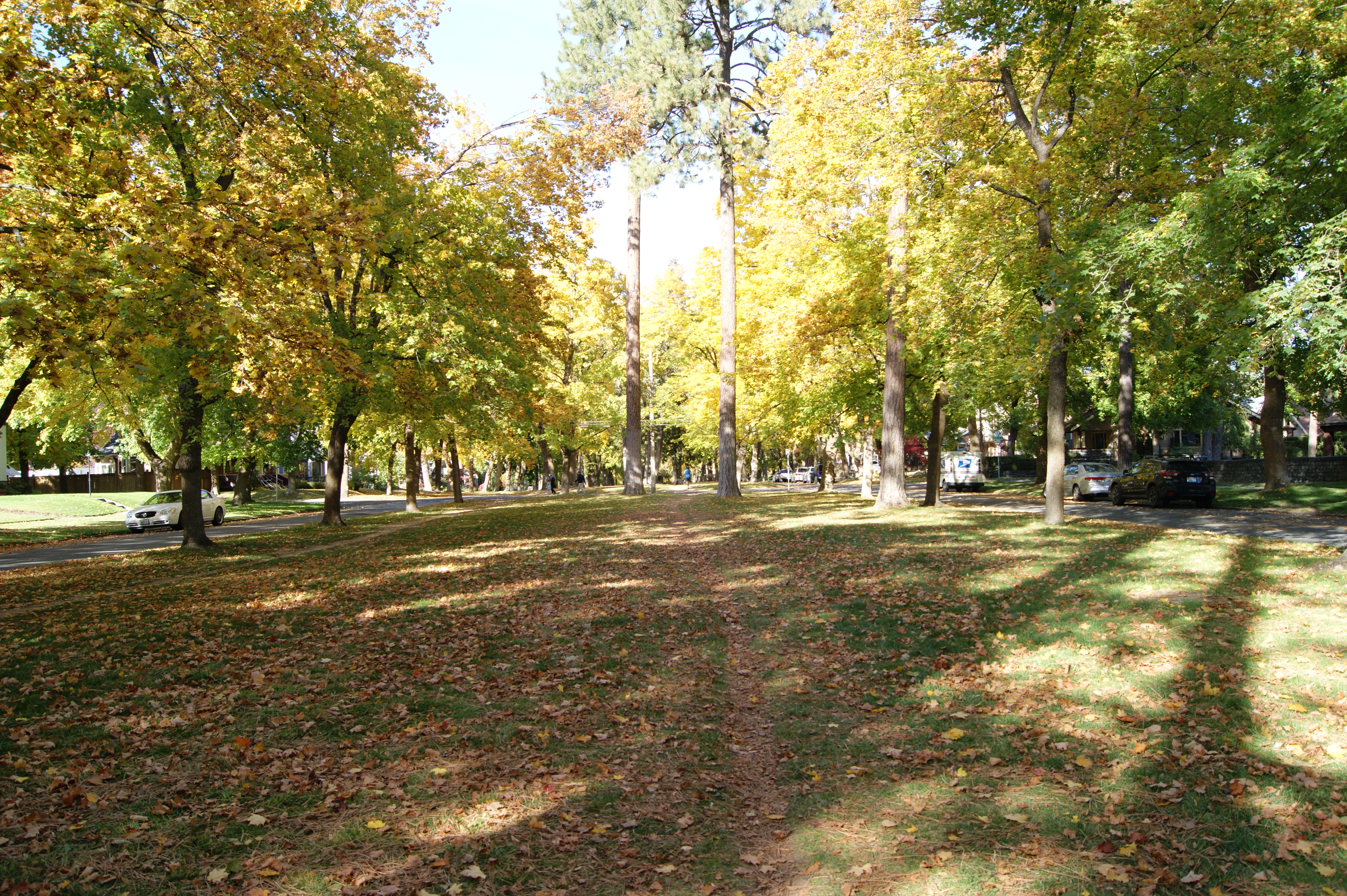
Manito Boulevard parkway

Spokane has some notable parkways. In addition to Manito Park, Manito Boulevard is a 1-mile (1.6 km) tree-lined parkway that leads up to the park that is used for various recreational activities such as walking or jogging. Other parkways such as Rockwood Boulevard and High Drive Parkway were developed with input from the Olmsteds. The Olmsted-designed Rockwood neighborhood has a parkway and also four "Triangle Parks". High Drive Parkway is described as "a picturesque driveway lying on the high bluff in the southwest portion of the city overlooking the Latah Creek valley" in the Olmsted Report to the city Park Board and has park benches and car pull outs for sightseeing; along High Drive is also High Drive Bluff Park that features 22 miles (35 km) of trails popular for dog walking, hiking, running, and biking. Other boulevards have green infrastructure such as a sponge city solution on Country Homes Boulevard in north Spokane, which replaced an asphalt stormwater flood control channel with a 1-mile (1.6 km) bioswale with elm and birch trees and foliage like wood sage, blue oat grass, and lilac in 2013.

=== Urban forestry ===
The city Parks and Recreation Department manages about 78,000 trees on its parkland as well as lining the city streets in its Urban Forestry Program. To increase the distribution of street trees, the city urban forestry program partners with The Lands Council, a local organization with a mission to "ensure every neighborhood has access to trees and green space". The city has the goal to increase the tree canopy coverage from 23 percent to 40 percent by 2030.
