= List of tallest buildings in Spokane =

Tall buildings in Spokane
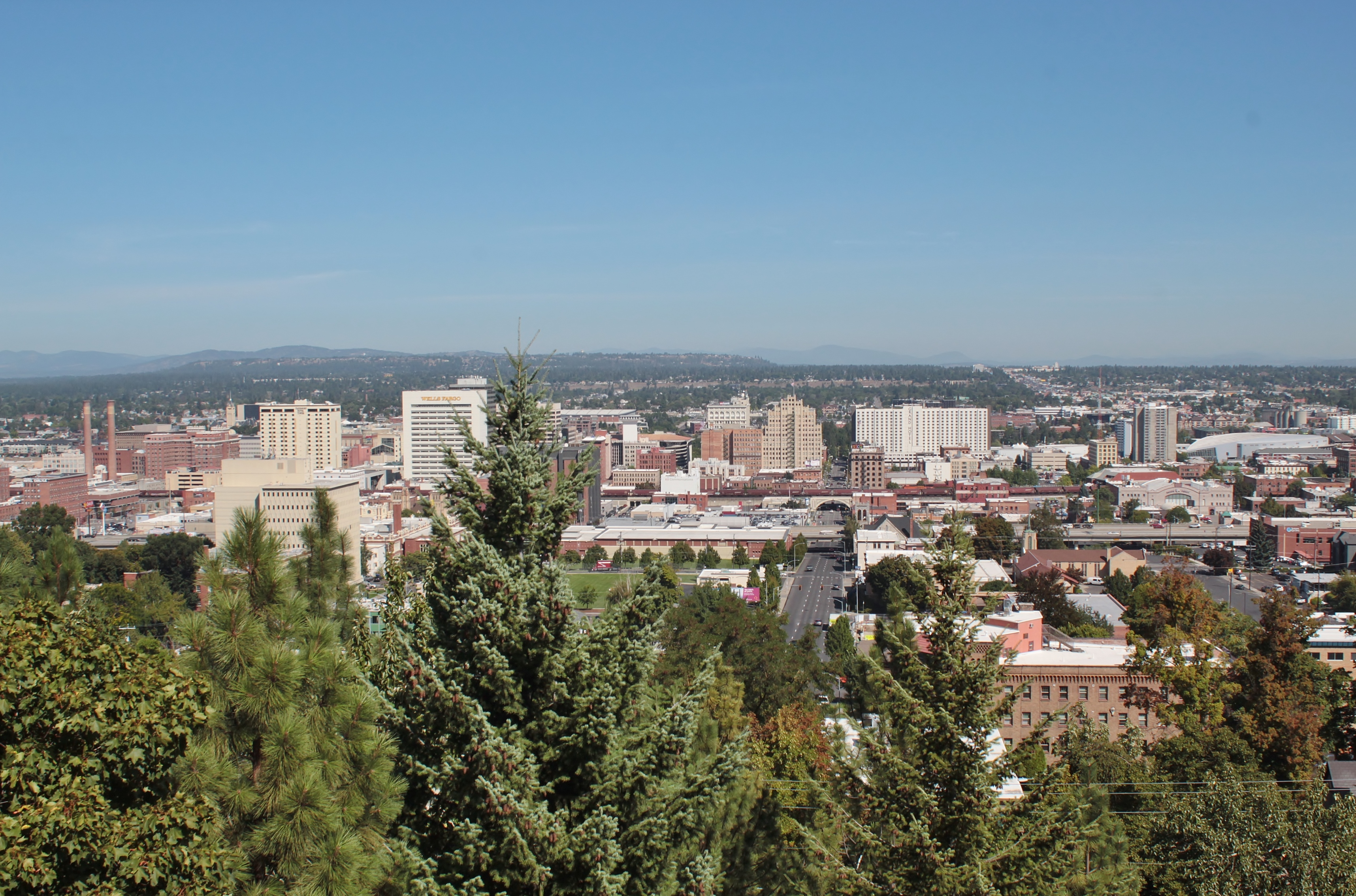
- Downtown Spokane skyline from the South Hill
- Tallest building: Bank of America Financial Center (1981)
- Tallest building height: 288 feet (88 m)

Number of tall buildings
- Taller than 50 m (164 ft): 17

Number of tall buildings — feet
- Taller than 200 ft (61.0 m): 7

The city of Spokane, located in the east of the U.S. state of Washington, is the metropolitan center of the Inland Northwest region of the United States, where it serves as a hub for retail trade and services. As of January 2022, Spokane has 40 high-rise buildings. High-rise development began in 1891, shortly after the Great Spokane Fire of 1889, with the completion of the 146-foot (45 m) Review Building featuring a traditional brick-and-stone construction.

In the late 19th century, the term skyscraper was typically used to describe buildings of a relatively modest 10 to 20 stories in height that were built on a ground level of thick masonry walls, as opposed to the contemporary usage of the term which is often used to describe more modern high-rise buildings in excess of 40 or 50 stories that were made possible with the incorporation of a metal framework. After the advent of steel-frame construction, allowing for increased strength to support more floors, the construction of skyscrapers locally began increasing in the early 20th century.

The U.S. Bank Building (built 1910) and the Paulsen Medical and Dental Building (built 1929) were among the earliest skyscrapers in Spokane and both held the title of tallest building in the city, respectively. The U.S. Bank Building was also the tallest building in the state of Washington upon its completion. The current tallest building in Spokane, surpassing the Paulsen Medical and Dental Building, is the 288-foot-tall (88 m) Bank of America Financial Center, which was completed in 1981 and has held the distinction for 45 years. Taller buildings have since been proposed but not constructed.

== Cityscape ==
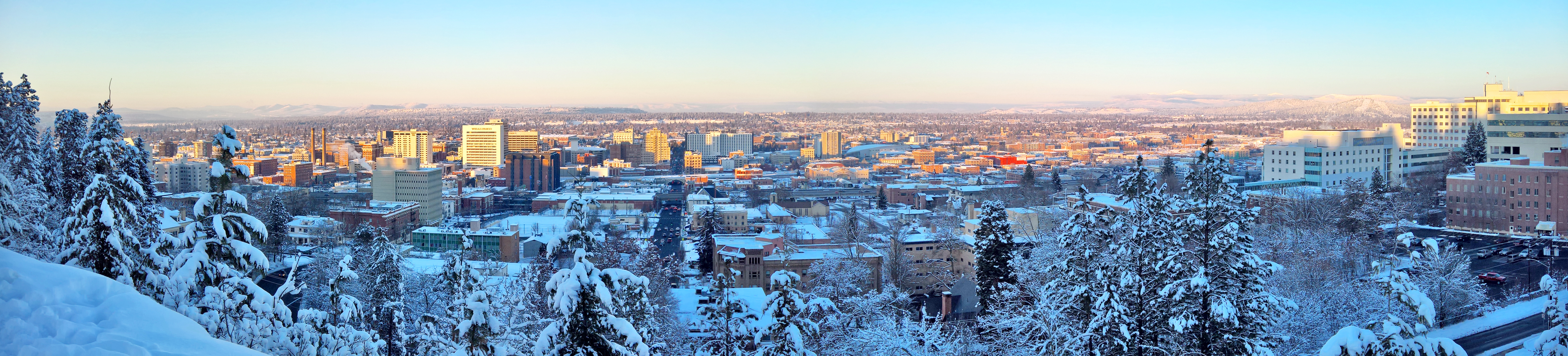
Panorama of Downtown Spokane looking north from Cliff Drive in December 2015

== Tallest buildings ==
Spokane has 24 high rises that stand at least 145 feet (44 m) tall based on standard height measurement. This height includes spires and architectural details but does not include antenna masts. (Note: If two or more buildings are of the same height, they are listed in order of floor count, then alphabetically. The "Year" column indicates the year in which a building was completed.) Spokane's first high-rise, the Review Building was the tallest building in Spokane upon completion in 1891 and held the title for roughly 10 years. The U.S. Bank Building was the tallest building in the city from 1910 until 1929 when it was surpassed in height by the Paulsen Medical and Dental Building, which lasted as the tallest from 1929 until 1981 when the current tallest building, the Bank of America Financial Center was completed.

Tallest buildings in Spokane
Rank	Name	Image	Height ft (m)	Floors	Use	Year	Coordinates	Ref.
1	Bank of America Financial Center	Bank of America Financial Center	288 (88)	20	Offices	1981	47°39′27″N 117°25′18″W	(Note: The Bank of America Financial Center was officially topped out on December 12, 1980.)
2	Washington Trust Tower	Washington Trust Tower	243 (74)	18	Offices	1982	47°39′22″N 117°25′18″W	
3	Davenport Hotel Tower	Davenport Hotel Tower	224 (68)	20	Hotel	2007	47°39′23″N 117°25′22″W	
4	Paulsen Medical and Dental Building	Paulsen Medical Center	221 (67)	18	Offices	1929	47°39′28″N 117°25′7″W	
5	U.S. Bank Building	US Bank Building	219 (67)	16	Offices	1910	47°39′30″N 117°25′9″W	(Note: Tallest building in the city and state upon completion in 1910)
6	Washington Trust Financial Center	Washington Trust Financial Center	212 (65)	16	Offices	1973	47°39′25″N 117°25′22″W	
7	Chase Building	Chase Building	205 (62)	15	Offices	1973	47°39′31″N 117°25′18″W	
8	Davenport Grand Hotel	Davenport Grand Hotel	195 (59) (Note: Height estimated by Emporis)	16	Hotel	2015	47°39′35″N 117°25′1″W	
8	Cathedral Plaza	Cathedral Plaza	195 (59)	15	Residential	1971	47°39′27″N 117°25′45″W	
8	Riverfalls Tower	Riverfalls Tower	195 (59)	15	Residential	1973	47°39′30″N 117°25′52″W	
11	Park Tower	Park Tower	190 (58)	20	Residential	1974	47°39′35″N 117°24′51″W	
12	DoubleTree Hotel Spokane City Center	DoubleTree Hotel Spokane City Center	182 (55)	14	Hotel	1975	47°39′40″N 117°24′50″W	
12	Sacred Heart Medical Center - Main Tower	Sacred Heart Medical Center - Main Tower	182 (55)	14	Hospital	1971	47°38′57″N 117°24′47″W	
14	Cathedral of St. John the Evangelist	Cathedral of St. John the Evangelist	180 (55)	1	Religious	1961	47°38′42″N 117°24′36″W	(Note: Construction started in 1925)
15	Parkade Plaza	Parkade Plaza	173 (53)	11	Parking	1967	47°39′32″N 117°25′13″W	(Note: Topped by a tall, distinctive tower)
16	Lilac Plaza	Lilac Plaza	169 (52)	13	Residential	1972	47°43′16″N 117°24′16″W	
17	Cathedral of Our Lady of Lourdes	Cathedral of Our Lady of Lourdes	164 (50)	1	Religious	1908	47°39′29″N 117°25′42″W	(Note: Seat of the Roman Catholic Diocese of Spokane)
18	Paulsen Building	Paulsen Building	160 (49)	11	Offices	1911	47°39′28″N 117°25′9″W	(Note: Architect John K. Dow also designed a near replica, the McLeod Building in Edmonton)
19	Davenport Hotel	Davenport Hotel	157 (48)	14	Hotel	1914	47°39′25″N 117°25′28″W	
20	Ridpath Club Apartments	Ridpath Hotel	156 (48)	12	Residential	1952	47°39′25″N 117°25′13″W	
21	Centennial Hotel	Centennial Hotel	156 (48)	12	Hotel	1993	47°39′50″N 117°25′0″W	
22	Centennial Mills Flouring Mill	Centennial Mills Flouring Mill	147 (45)	10	Industrial	1940	47°39′46″N 117°22′34″W	
23	Cooper George	Cooper George	146 (45)	13	Residential	1952	47°39′4″N 117°25′21″W	
23	Review Building	Review Building	146 (45)	10	Offices	1891	47°39′27″N 117°25′34″W	(Note: The Spokesman-Review headquarters)

== In popular culture ==
The subject of skyscrapers in Spokane entered popular culture in an episode of How I Met Your Mother when a proposed building became a topic of discussion, where main character, Ted Mosby, an architect, was tasked by his boss with designing a 78-story skyscraper for a client in downtown Spokane. When revealed to the client later in the episode, the building was ridiculed for its phallic shape and the design was rejected.

== See also ==
- Architecture of Spokane, Washington
