= Whitten Block =

- U.S. National Register of Historic Places
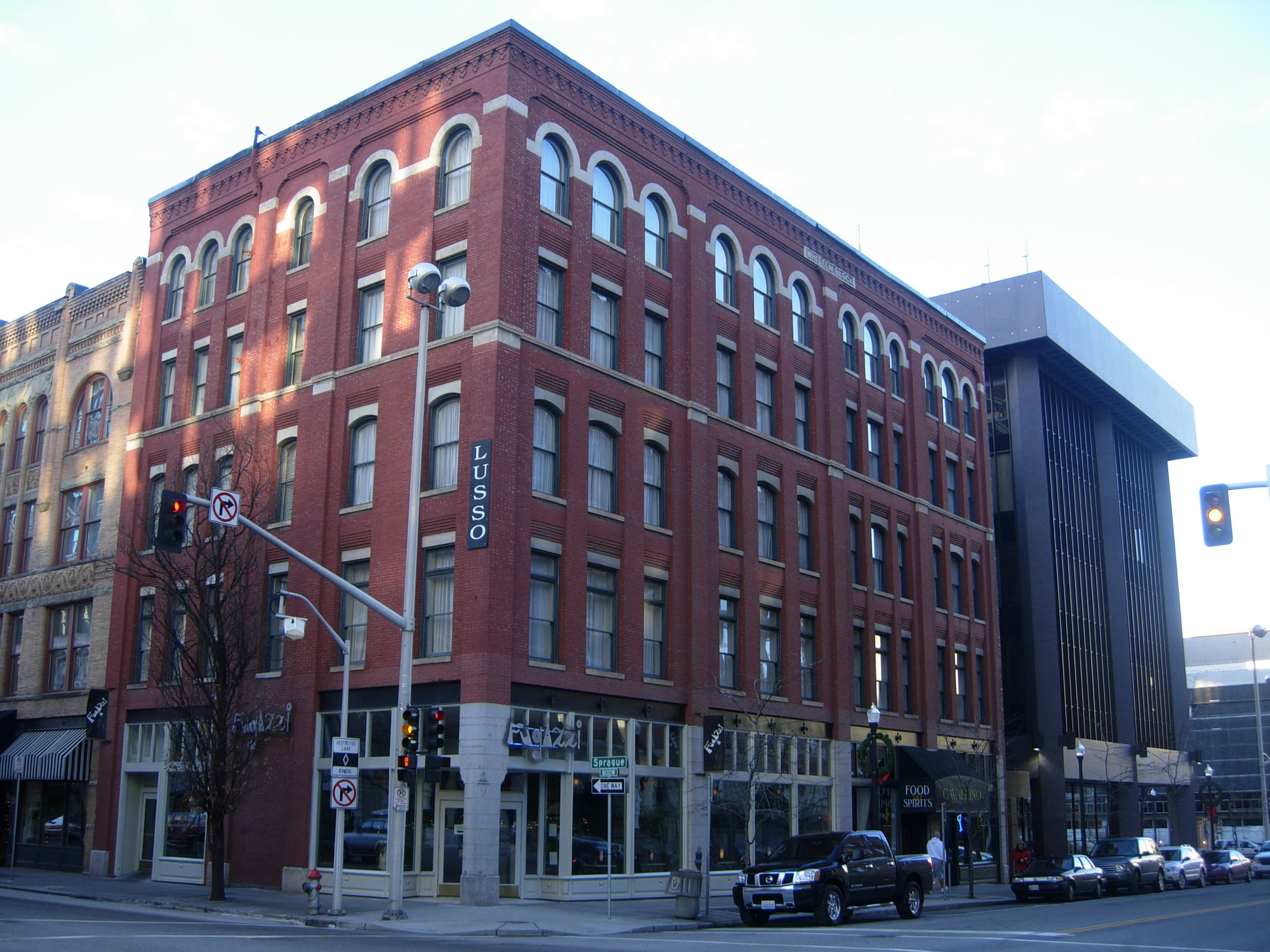
- The building in 2007

- Location within Spokane riverfront area
- Location: N. 1 Post Street, Spokane, Washington
- Coordinates: 47°39′28″N 117°25′22″W
- Area: less than one acre
- Built: 1890
- Architect: Lorenzo M. Boardman
- Architectural style: Romanesque
- NRHP reference No.: 93000362
- Added to NRHP: May 14, 1993

The Whitten Block is a historic five-story building in Spokane, Washington. It was designed by architect Lorenzo M. Boardman, and built in 1890 for investor Leydford B. Whitten at a cost of $40,000. Tenants included a dry goods store, a flower shop, a shoe repair store, a candy store as well as clothing stores.

In the 1990s the Whitten building and adjacent Miller Block were renovated to be the Hotel Lusso. The building once was the location of Louis Davenport's restaurant before the construction of his hotel. The Whitten Block was listed on the National Register of Historic Places on May 14, 1993.

In 2025 The Davenport Hotel Collection remodeled the building along with the Miller Block, and Hotel was renamed The Louie after Davenport Hotel founder Louis Davenport.
