= Lorenzo M. Boardman =

American architect

- Born: c. 1832; Pennsylvania, U.S.
- Died: July 16, 1897; Spokane, Washington, U.S.
- Resting place: Greenwood Memorial Terrace, Spokane, Washington, U.S.
- Occupation: Architect
- Spouse: Lucy Boardman
- Children: 2 sons, 4 daughters

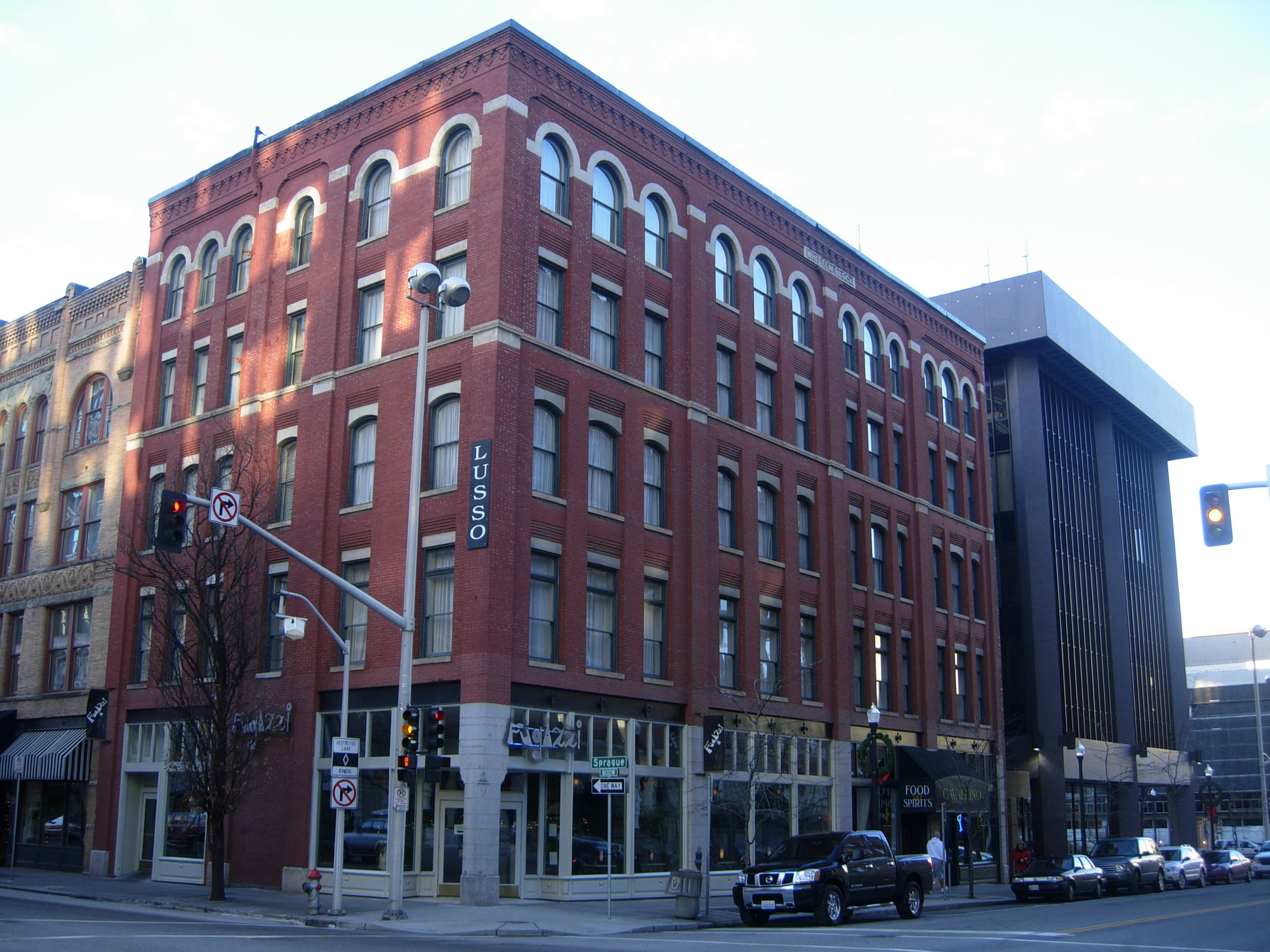
The Whitten Block, designed by Boardman.

Lorenzo M. Boardman (c. 1832 - July 16, 1897) was an American architect. Born in Pennsylvania, he was an architect in Minneapolis, Minnesota for three decades. He spent the last ten years of his life in Spokane, Washington, where he designed many buildings, including the Traders Block, Temple Court, the Ross Block, and the Windsor Block. He also designed the NRHP-listed Whitten Block.
