= Louis Davenport =

American businessman

- Born: Llewellyn Marks Davenport; July 14, 1868; Pawnee City, Nebraska, U.S.
- Died: July 28, 1951 (aged 83); Spokane, Washington, U.S.
- Occupations: Businessman, Entrepreneur

Llewellyn Marks "Louis" Davenport (July 14, 1868 – July 28, 1951) was an American businessman best known for establishing the Davenport Hotel in downtown Spokane, Washington.

== Life and career ==
Davenport was born in Pawnee City, Nebraska to John and Minnie Davenport. He came to Spokane from Nebraska at the age of 20 in March 1889. He first worked at a restaurant owned by his uncle Elijah, called the Pride of Spokane. It burned down in the great fire of August 1889 and Louis started his own business, called Davenport's Restaurant, three days after the fire with two tents and salvaged furniture. Soon his establishment was one of the most renowned restaurants in the Northwest. Over the years, many celebrities traveled to Spokane and dined at Davenport's, including President William Howard Taft in 1909. He added onto the establishment with more dining rooms, a larger kitchen, and more ballrooms. In 1906, his restaurant was popular enough to garner the following review in the national magazine The Philistine: "The best example of Spokane spirit, crystalized, is Davenport's restaurant... [it] is the best, the most unique and nearest perfect restaurant in America - perhaps the world." That same year a group of businessmen in Spokane had a vision to accommodate the vast number of travelers to the booming Spokane area with a large, grand hotel and asked Louis Davenport to build and oversee it. Davenport agreed and enlisted the aid of famed local architect Kirtland Cutter to design the hotel adjoining his restaurant. At an estimated cost of $2,000,000, the Davenport Hotel finally opened in August 1914. With its spacious Spanish Renaissance-styled main lobby, Isabella dining hall, Italian Gardens restaurant, Marie Antoinette Ballroom, and ornate Hall of Doges, the Davenport was widely considered one of America's grandest hotels and remained so for many years. Louis Davenport was very particular about his hotel and worked tirelessly the creation and management of his establishment, which was known for its excellent service and elegance at a reasonable rate.

Davenport retired and sold his establishment in 1945, but he and his wife maintained a residence there until he died on the eleventh floor of the hotel in 1951. After passing through the hands of many owners over the next three decades, the Davenport Hotel closed in 1985. It was opened again in 2001 under the ownership of local businessman Walt Worthy.

According to local legend and historical time approximately, Davenport is considered by some the creator of the Crab Louis salad.
