= Ridpath Club Apartments =

Apartment block in Washington State, United States

Ridpath Club Apartments (formerly the Ridpath Hotel)
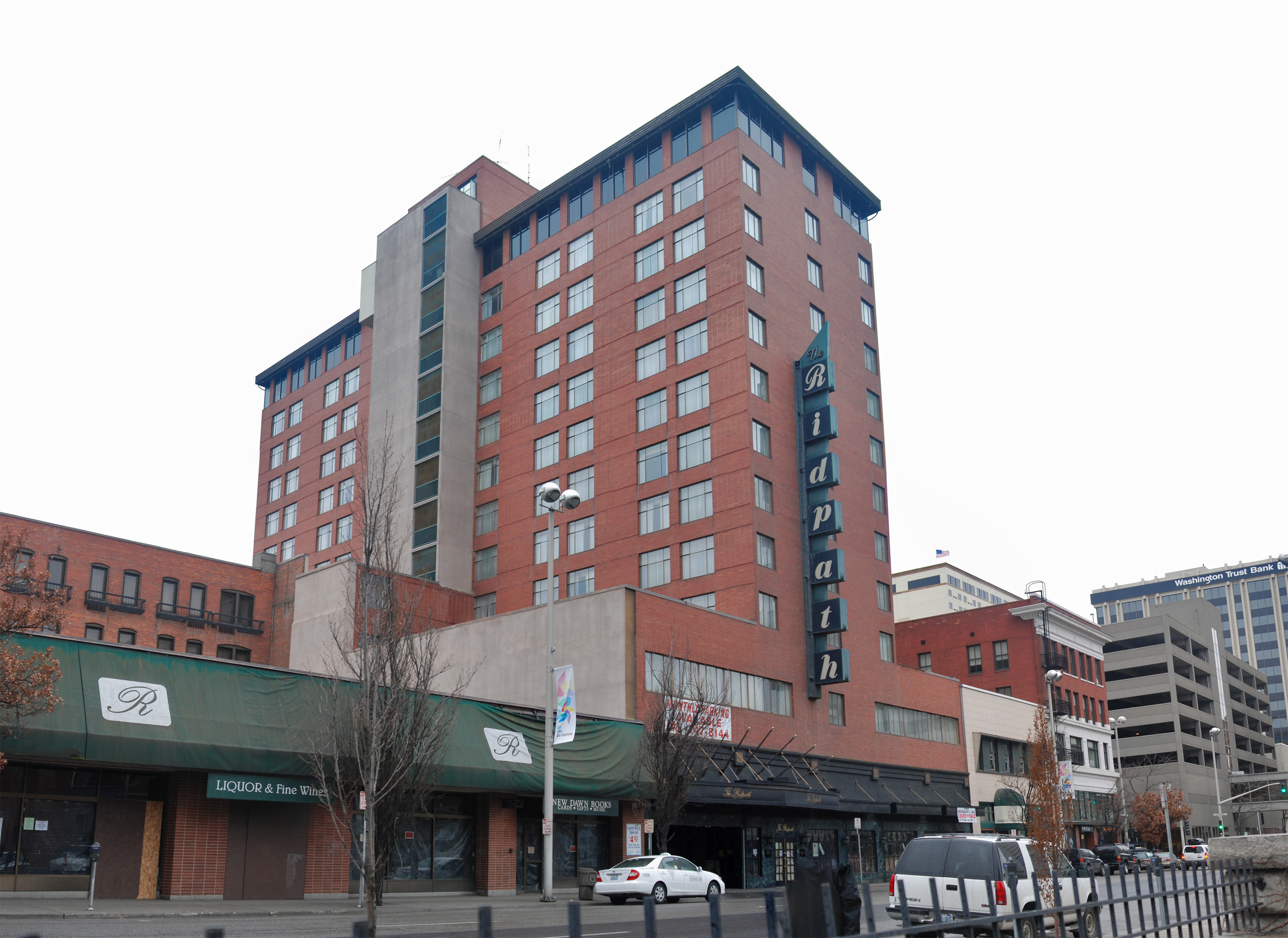
- The Ridpath in 2012
- Interactive map of the Ridpath Club Apartments (formerly the Ridpath Hotel) area
- Former names: WestCoast Ridpath; Cavanaugh's Ridpath Hotel

General information
- Status: completed (closed 2008 as a hotel, currently apartments)
- Architectural style: Modernism
- Location: 515 W Sprague Avenue, Spokane, Washington, United States
- Coordinates: 47.6569°N 117.42°W
- Current tenants: 200+
- Completed: 1952 (Ridpath Tower); 1906 (Y Building); 1889 (Halliday Building); 1963 (Executive Court Building)
- Landlord: naiblack

Height
- Height: 158.55 ft (48.33 m)

Technical details
- Structural system: Steel
- Floor count: 13

Design and construction
- Architect: Ned Hyman Abrams

- Ridpath Hotel
- U.S. National Register of Historic Places
- NRHP reference No.: 13001000
- Added to NRHP: December 24, 2013

The Ridpath Hotel is a complex of four buildings in Spokane, Washington – the Ridpath Tower (completed in 1952), the Halliday Building (completed 1889), the Y Building (completed 1906), and the Executive Court building (completed in 1963). The Ridpath Tower, the main portion of the hotel, was designed by San Francisco architect Ned Hyman Abrams and is the second iteration of the Ridpath Hotel – the original building was destroyed by fire in 1950. The hotel, originally opened in 1900 and closed in 2008, and has now been fully renovated and opened as a low-income apartment complex called Ridpath Club Apartments in 2017. It has the distinction of being Spokane's longest continuously run hotel through those 108 years. The Ridpath reopened as the Ridpath Club Apartments in March 2018. The building offers the first micro apartments available in the city, which are essentially a converted hotel room designed to be affordable housing units or workforce housing.

== History ==
The Ridpath Hotel was established by Colonel William Ridpath in 1899, with its original building opening in 1900. The first building suffered through two fires, the first in 1902 (and was subsequently restored), and another in 1950 which damaged the building beyond repair. The fire, which broke out on the evening of February 28, 1950, burned through the night for thirteen hours and caused an estimated US$1,000,000 (equivalent to $13,380,000 in 2025) in damages to the 5-story building as well as adjacent structures. The original hotel was demolished and a new 12-story tower was constructed in its place, which opened in 1952. The Ridpath was used for filming the 1985 movie "Vision Quest (film)"

=== The new Ridpath Tower ===
In June 1950, just a short three months after fire damaged the original Ridpath Hotel beyond repair, construction work began on a replacement: a steel-framed, 250-room, 12-story high building to be called the Ridpath Tower. The building, which was erected on the same site of the old hotel, was originally envisioned to be an 8-story building, 200-room hotel. The new, modernistic hotel incorporated many features that were unique to hotels of its time including a drive-in ramp garage with parking in the basement, all rooms with an exterior view, modern bathrooms with tub/shower combos that had walls tiled up to the ceiling, and high-speed, self-leveling elevators. The building also incorporated mixed-use functions, with street level store fronts and the entire third floor dedicated as office space to be rented out. Plans later added a glass-enclosed 13th floor which housed a club and restaurant.

The new hotel was completed at a price tag of over US$3,000,000 (equivalent to $36,370,000 in 2025) and was dedicated in April 1952 to much fanfare. Through the 1950s, 1960's, and 1970's the Ridpath was the top hotel in Spokane and hosted many balls, art shows, and other conventions and events in its facilities. The hotel welcomed in guests like Elvis Presley, numerous politicians, and reportedly, Michael Jackson. These decades also became a time of expansion for the hotel. In 1961, the historic Spokane Hotel across the street was razed and an addition to the Ridpath (what is now known as the Executive Court Building) was completed in 1963. In 1971, plans were announced by the hotel owners to acquire the adjacent, 6-story Halliday building (constructed in 1889). Although they demolished the upper 5 floors of the Halliday building, the ground floor was adaptively reused and renovated to tie into the existing hotel building to create a first class commercial facility with air conditioning and a central heating system. The ownership of the hotel remained within the Ridpath family until the hotel was sold to an outside investment group in a 1988 sale.

==== Architectural significance ====
The Ridpath Tower, which was designed by architect Ned Hyman Abrams of San Francisco, was the first all-welded steel frame high-rise building west of the Mississippi River at the time of its construction. Abrams is also notable for designing the General Mills Cereal Plant in Lodi, California in 1946 (just six years before the Ridpath Tower opened). That cereal plant was the first pre-cast concrete building to be erected in the State of California. Abrams also expanded on the use of pre-cast concrete technology, later designing the first tilt-up, pre-cast building in Northern California in 1948.

=== Decline ===
After leaving the hands of the Ridpath family in a 1988 sale to an outside investment group, the hotel began to decline. Prior to the sale, the Ridpath family had consistently reinvested in the hotel and kept it up to date with the latest trends and features in hotel design. This was evidenced by the continual expansion of the hotel during its peak and the fact that the 1952 tower incorporated features like modern bathrooms and a drive-up ramp garage. The new ownership group, however, let the hotel age. The hotel needed upgrades such as new elevators and updates to the look and feel of the interior. Because the owners let it remain in stagnant state, many of the hotel's amenities became obsolete by virtue of changing market conditions. The hotel began to become an after-thought, especially when the market conditions began to call for larger rooms. The hotel's original rooms, though once considered large and state-of-the-art, were no longer selling as well as they once did.

=== Multiple sales, fragmentation, and closure ===
After several years of decline, the hotel sold again just 10 years later in 1998. Just a quick six years later, in 2004, the newest ownership group sold the hotel in order to raise capital for improvements to other hotels in their portfolio. 2004 marked the beginning of the fragmentation of the Ridpath; up until this point, the entire property was owned by one entity. The Executive Court building portion of the complex was sold to investors looking to convert it into condominiums. The rest of the hotel was purchased in 2006 by a boutique hotelier out of Las Vegas, Nevada, but over the next two years, the physical condition of the hotel along with its business continued to decline. In an effort to raise capital to make improvements to the hotel which by then only had an average 50% occupancy levels, the Las Vegas hotelier decided to sell portions of the hotel to many different owners despite an offer by investors to purchase the entire property.

The hotel abruptly closed in August 2008. Due to the fact that multiple owners own different portions of the building, the complex has been tangled in a web of foreclosures due to the bad economy. Additionally, many legal battles have arisen regarding shared costs, maintenance, and code-compliance of the building. In June 2011, the property owners were ordered by the City of Spokane to clean up the property and the property had a no-occupancy order declared just 6 months later due to a lack of a functioning fire-suppression system.

== Preservation and redevelopment ==
Spokane has had a successful track record of historic preservation and adaptive re-use. Just several blocks down Sprague Avenue from the Ridpath Hotel, the Fox Theater, Davenport Hotel, and Steam Plant Square restoration and adaptive re-use projects that took place in the early 2000s have played an integral role in revitalizing that area of Downtown Spokane into a vibrant district. While the building could be demolished for $500,000 to $1,000,000, there is a strong belief among city leaders that a redeveloped/restored Ridpath Hotel can play a key role in "stabilizing downtown" (similar to the aforementioned projects down the road) and as such, they are working with developers to find a solution to save and redevelop the property. City leaders understand the role that the area around the Ridpath Hotel will play in Spokane's future. They believe it can be a bridge in linking the thriving core of Downtown (which contains the restored Davenport Hotel and Fox Theater) with the developing University District to the east, and they envision a renewed Ridpath to be the anchor of this district."

=== Current proposal ===
As of 2012, a group of developers share the same vision and have lined up $25 million and have plans to purchase the entire complex and turn it into an "entertainment Mecca." While not everything would be preserved in its original state (the iconic "R-I-D-P-A-T-H" letters at the top of the hotel would be removed), the proposed changes and alterations for the hotel would renew the relevance of the property for current times, renewing the spirit and attitude of the original Ridpath Hotel owners to constantly update the hotel during its peak decades. The tiny hotel rooms that seemed to be the root of the decline of the Ridpath in the late 1980s would not be a problem under the new proposal as multiple rooms could be grouped together to form multi-room suites. Additionally, to compete in the convention business, the old Halliday Building (which already has a history of being adaptively reused) would be transformed into a grand entrance to the hotel with an additional three floors added to the top of it for ballrooms, a nightclub, and rooftop patio for weddings and other events.

=== Philosophical aspects of the renewal of the Ridpath ===
While notions of memory and the nostalgia of returning to the hotel's glory years exist, the hotel (under the current proposal) would not be restored to its original state like the Fox Theater and lobby areas of the nearby Davenport Hotel were. City leaders and developers are excited about a contemporary intervention for the old hotel, similar to the adaptive re-use of the nearby Steam Plant Square. Their visions of renewal will incorporate philosophical and theoretical issues of preservation in the larger context of what role the building will play as part Spokane's urban fabric.

The current visions for the hotel parallel the preservation philosophies of prominent people such as architectural critic Ada Louise Huxtable. Huxtable's view is that the recycling and adaptation of buildings (into the contemporary context) "will keep them a living part of today's cities and communities." The standpoint that the small rooms of the Ridpath will not be a problem and that Halliday building will have brand new convention spaces added to it speaks to this adaptation of buildings into the contemporary context. Additionally, Eugène Viollet-le-Duc, a prominent French architect and theorist, argued that restoration is not to "repair nor rebuild it" but to "reestablish it in a finished state which may in fact never have actually existed." Lastly, the proposed architectural intervention would "safeguard the foundation of the historic city without treating history as a stage set" and "give new life to the historic city or building," according to Manuel J. Martin-Hernandez, a professor of architectural composition and former school dean at the University of Las Palmas in Spain.

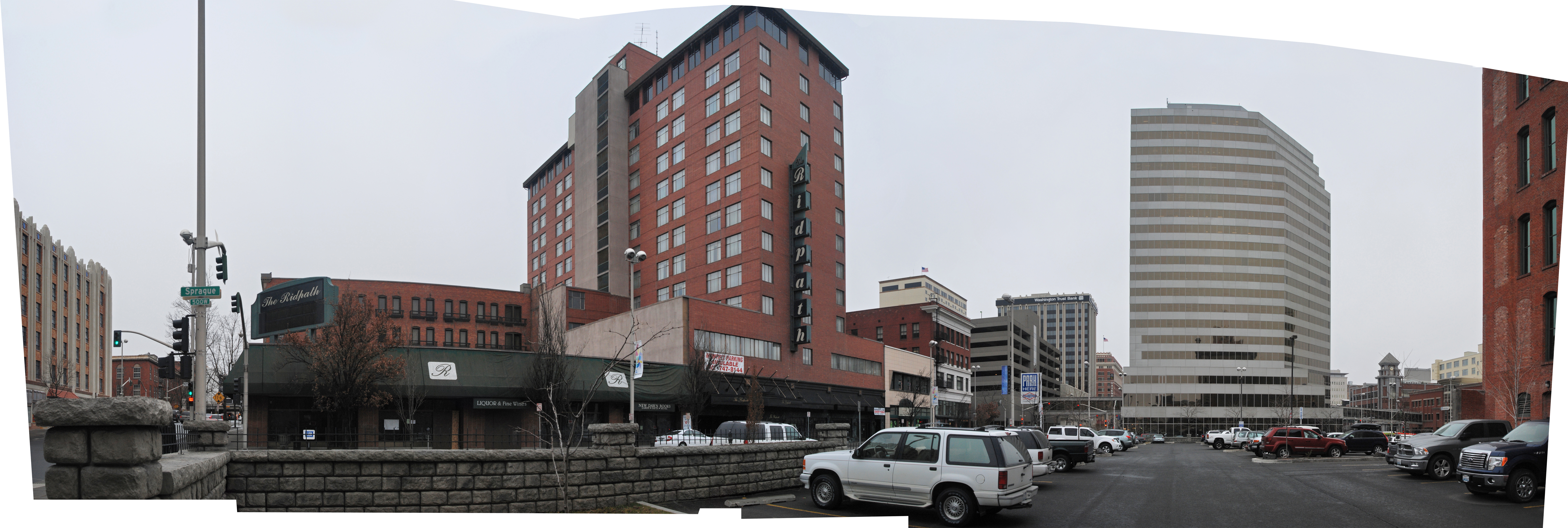
A renewed Ridpath Hotel will play a vital role in reactivating the Sprague Avenue corridor between the core of Downtown Spokane to the west and the developing University district to the east.
