= The Davenport Hotel Collection =

Hotels in Spokane, Washington

- Type: Brand
- Industry: Hospitality, tourism
- Founded: 2002
- Area served: Downtown Spokane
- Key people: Walt Worthy

The Davenport Hotel Collection is a brand collection of four upscale hotels in Spokane, Washington. All the hotels are located in Downtown Spokane. The brand is owned by KSL Capital Partners and operated by the Davidson Hospitality Group.

== History ==
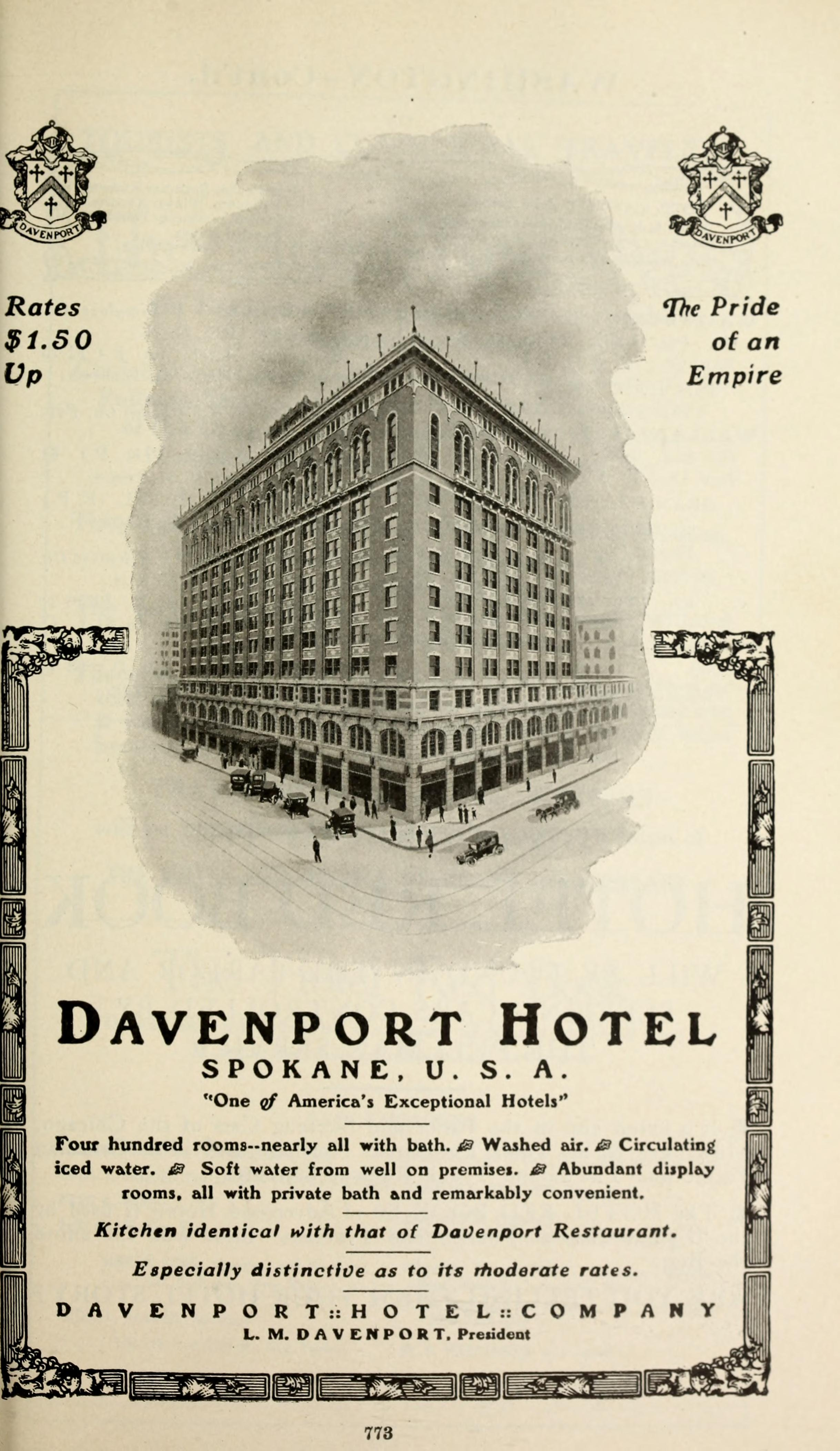
The modern branding such as the logo takes inspiration from past marketing materials

=== Creation of the brand ===
The roots of the hotel brand coincide with the restoration and 2002 reopening of the historic Davenport Hotel in Downtown Spokane. At the time, the brand collection consisted of just the historic hotel, and was merely known as The Davenport Hotel. In January 2007, Walt Worthy opened a new, 328-room, 21-floor hotel tower across the street from the historic hotel. Despite being a separate building with a separate architecture and theme, the tower was operated as part of the historic hotel. To reflect this, brand name was updated to The Davenport Hotel and Tower.

=== Expansion of the brand ===
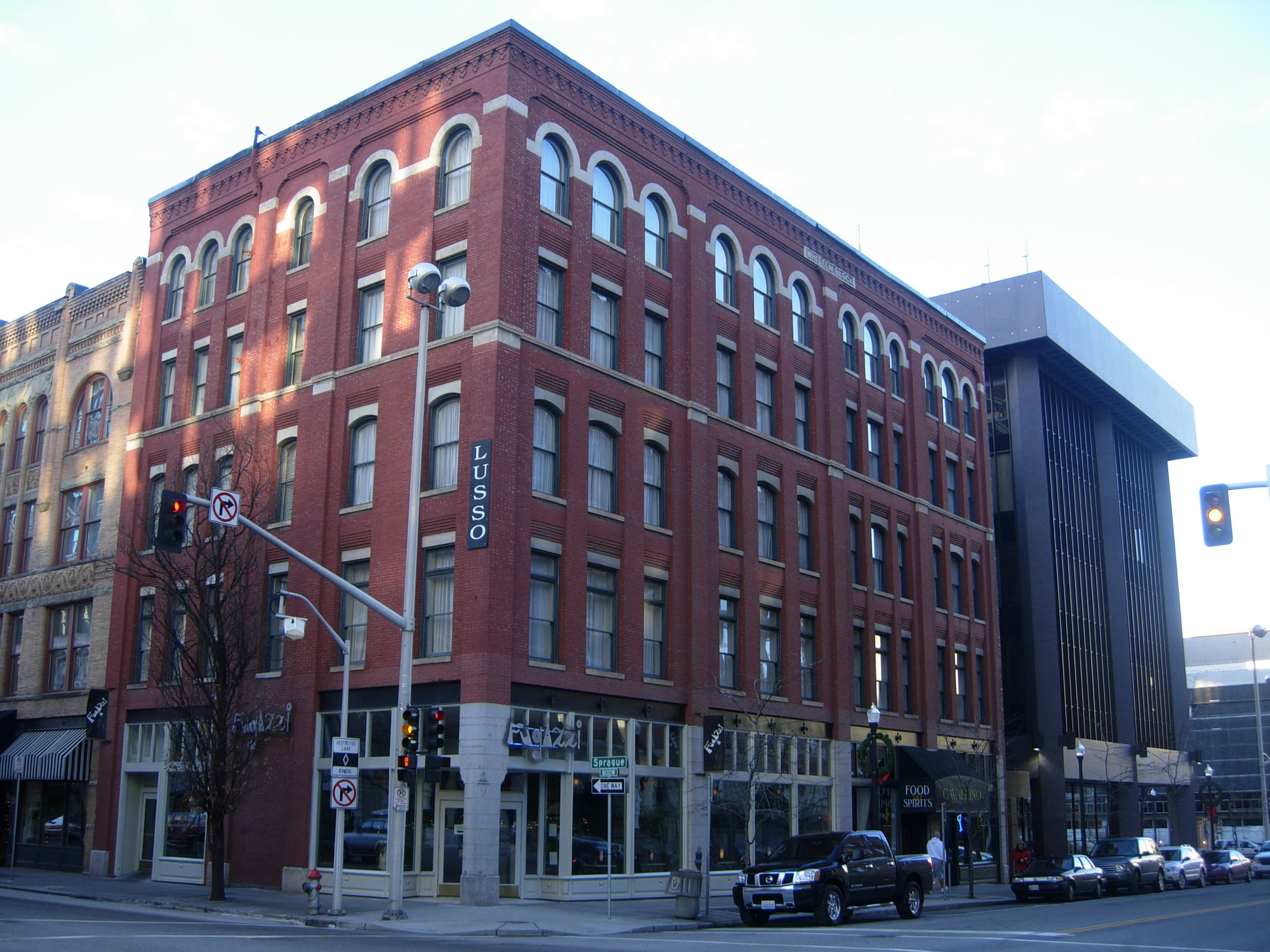
The Whitten Block was once owned by Louis Davenport and is now part of the Hotel Lusso

In 2009, Worthy acquired the Hotel Lusso, a boutique hotel also located across the street from the historic hotel. After this acquisition, the Davenport brand was restructured into its present-day name and format of The Davenport Hotel Collection whereby the hotels would be marketed as separate properties under a unified Davenport brand umbrella. The historic hotel was subsequently marketed as The Historic Davenport Hotel, the tower referred to as The Davenport Tower, and the Lusso adopted the name The Davenport Lusso.

In 2013, work on a fourth hotel under The Davenport Hotel Collection brand began. The new hotel, named The Davenport Grand, is located directly across from the Spokane Convention Center, and is the largest building constructed in the city since The Davenport Tower in 2007, standing at around 18 stories tall. Construction was completed in 2015 including a skywalk to connect the hotel with the Convention Center. The new hotel is not quite as tall as the tower hotel, but has a very long-thin design. The ownership group grew to five hotels in July 2018 when the 401-room Hotel Red Lion at the Park was bought from Red Lion Hotels Corporation for $35 million, but the property was given an independent branding with the name the Centennial Hotel Spokane.

Beginning in 2014, all hotels in the brand collection became affiliated with Marriott as part of their Autograph Collection Hotels chain. In January 2022, the 1,787-room hotel chain was sold by the Worthy’s to the private equity firm, KSL Capital Partners and would be operated by Davidson Hospitality Group. The five hotels were sold for about $200 million.

== The Hotels ==
The Davenport Hotel Collection

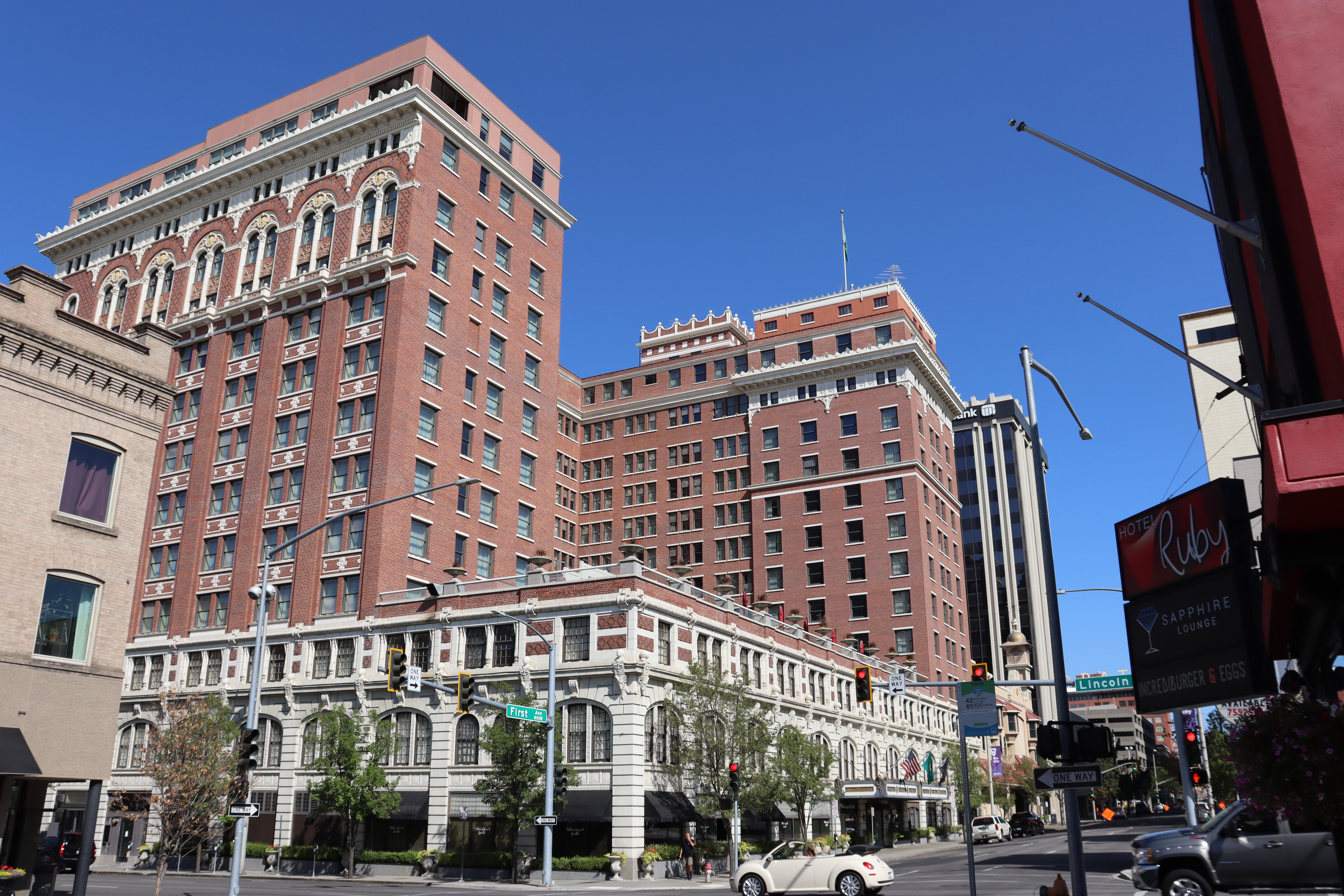
The Historic Davenport Hotel

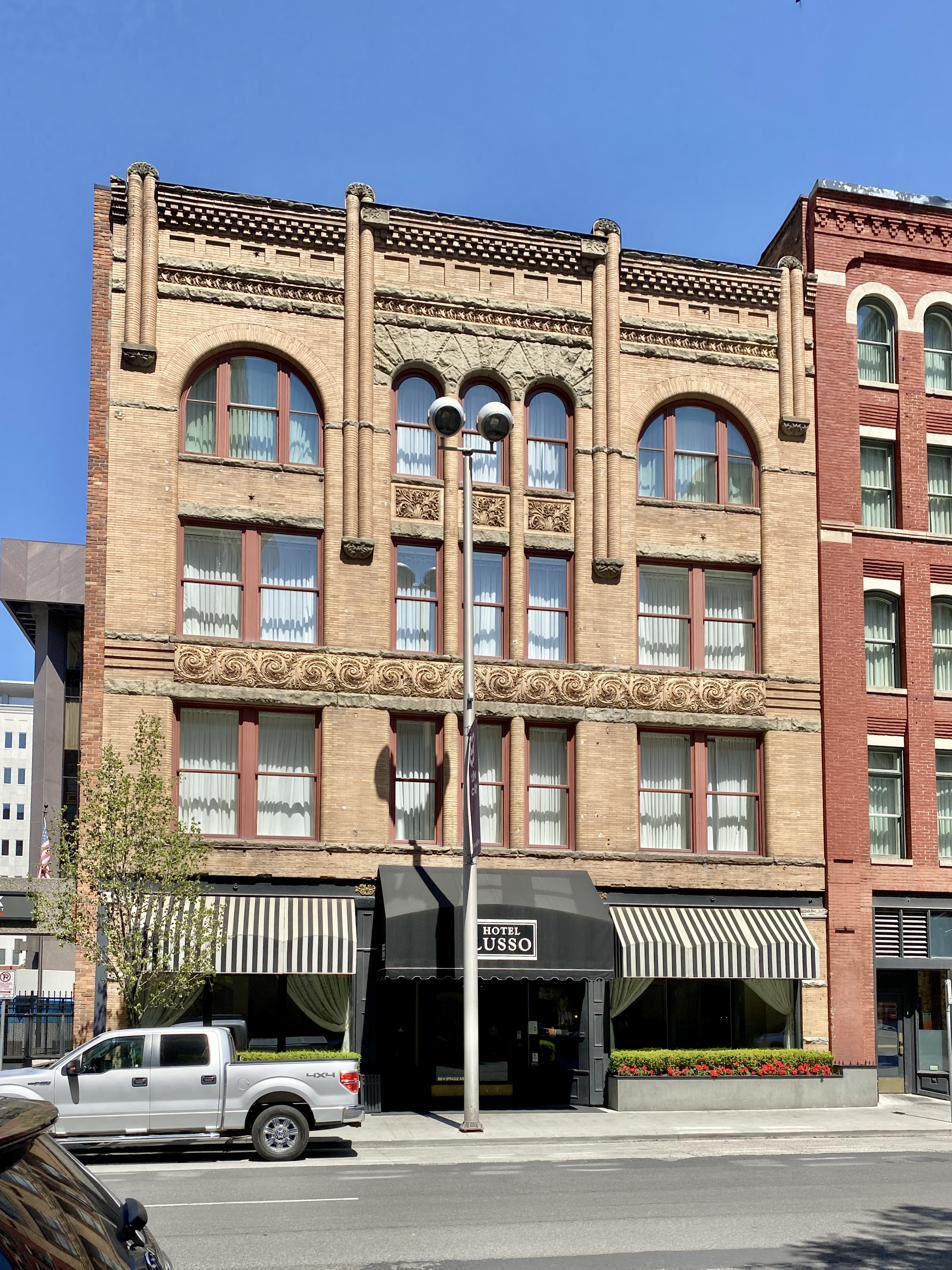
Davenport Lusso

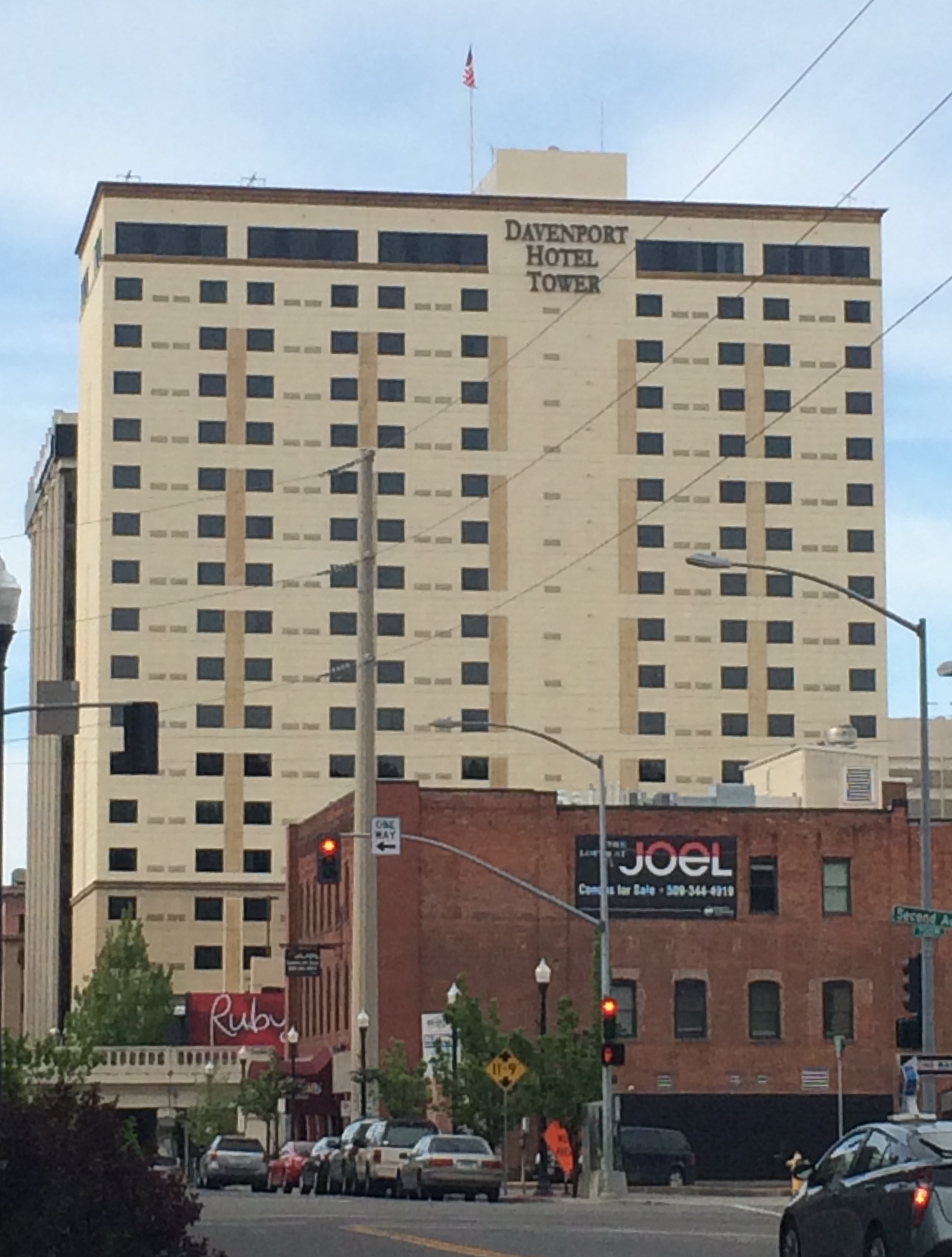
Davenport Hotel Tower

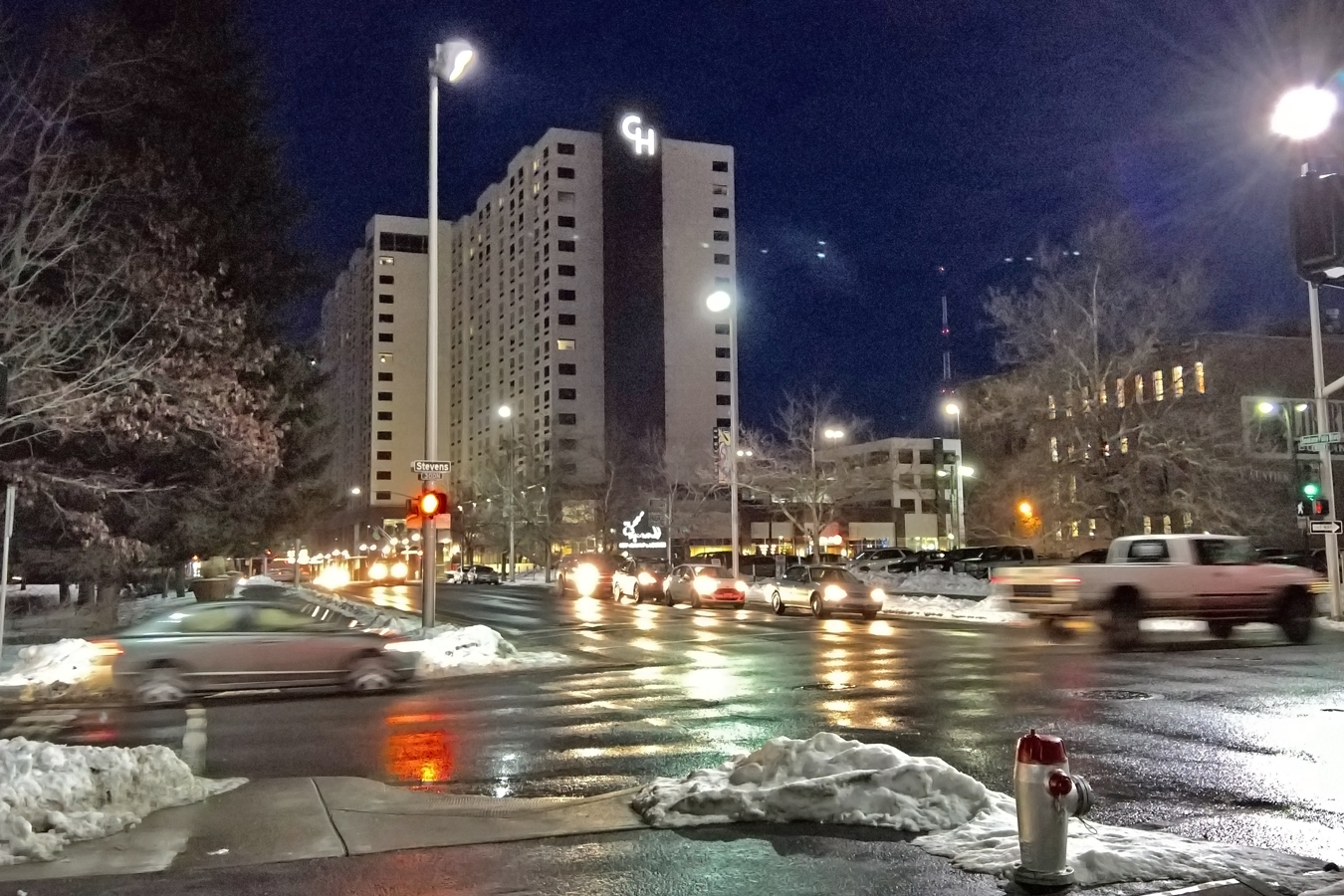
The Davenport Grand

=== The Historic Davenport Hotel ===
The Historic Davenport Hotel was restored and opened in 2002. It features 284 guest rooms and has a spa, a gym and an indoor pool.

=== The Davenport Tower ===
The Davenport Tower opened in 2007 and features a safari theme. It features 328 guest rooms on 21 floors and has an indoor pool, an on-site restaurant, and a cocktail lounge.

=== The Davenport Lusso ===
The Davenport Lusso was acquired and added to the brand collection by Walt Worthy in May 2009. It is a boutique hotel and originally opened in 1998 after two historic buildings were purchased, combined, and renovated. It features 48 guest rooms and a pub.

=== The Davenport Grand ===
The Davenport Grand opened in 2015 and features a contemporary theme. It is the largest hotel in Spokane by number of guest rooms with 716 guest rooms on 17 floors (16 above ground level) and has two restaurants, a gym and a whiskey bar on a terrace overlooking Riverfront Park. It is located directly across from the Spokane Convention Center and is designed to accommodate business and convention travelers.

Construction began in September 2013 on a site originally reserved for convention center expansion. The land was sold to the Worthys for $6.67 million and the hotel was constructed for an estimated $138 million.
