= August Paulsen =

Danish-American businessman

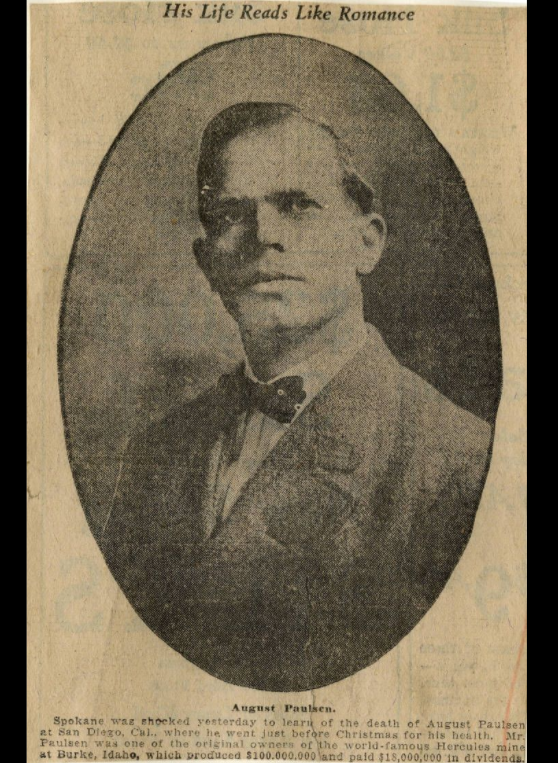
Picture of August Paulsen

August Paulsen (July 29, 1871 – March 11, 1927) was a Danish-American businessman noted for his philanthropy in the states of Washington and Idaho.

== Background ==
August Paulsen was a Danish immigrant, who arrived in America at the age of fourteen. He came to America as a stowaway on a ship. When he first arrived in America he stayed with an uncle. Paulsen arrived in Spokane, Washington in the autumn of 1892, where he would later be regarded as a great asset to the community.

== Career ==
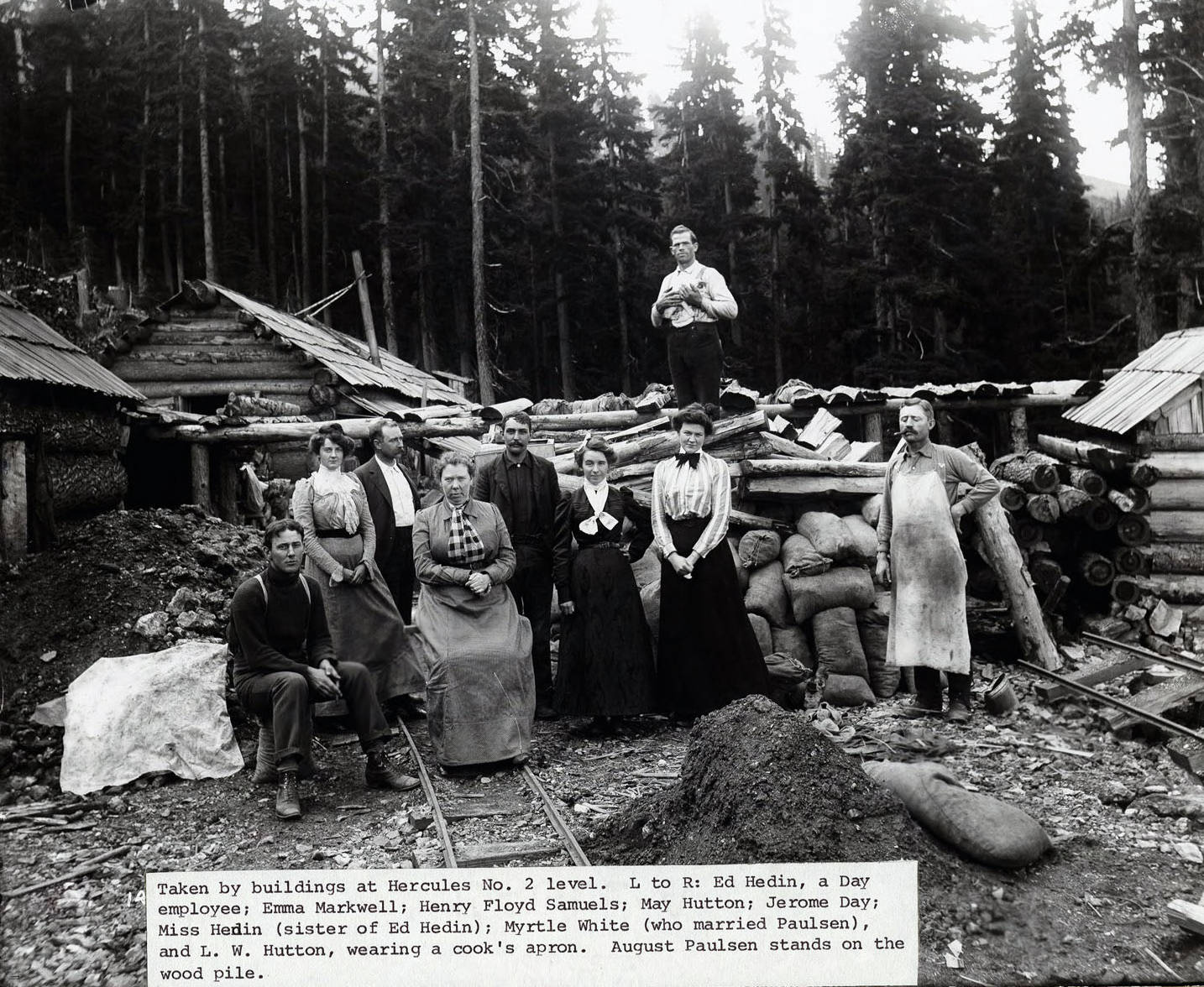
Hercules Mine Owners in 1901. August Paulsen stands on the wood pile.

Paulsen initially worked in the dairy industry in Spokane and Wallace, Idaho. However, his interest lay in the mountains of the Coeur d'Alenes district, where productive mining claims were making hard working miners rich. In 1895, Paulsen managed to save $850 to buy a quarter stake in the Hercules mining claim. Paulsen's partners in the claim included Harry, Eugene, and Jerome Day, three brothers, Charles H. Reeves (Dad Reeves), Levi W. Hutton, Frank Rothrock, Damien Cardoner, and the Markwells. These partners all came from working-class backgrounds like Paulsen, and their mining claim was considered "essentially a poor man's mine" as a 1927 article of the Spokesman-Review notes.

The partners had very little capital with which to work the mine, so much of the digging, drilling, shoring, hauling and other difficult mining work was done by hand. Paulsen is often credited with keeping the partners together, and keeping focus on working and exploring the mine. Upon manually drilling a 1500-foot shaft, the partners finally exposed a high quality ore body in 1901 that proved to be the best in the district. The Hercules mine provided a full six percent of the nation's lead, and also produced good values in silver. The Hercules mine continued production until its closure in 1925.The mine produced 100,000,000 dollars or 3,253,988,235 dollars in today's money.

With Paulsen's resultant wealth, he poured millions of dollars into the Spokane region, which still benefits the region today. Paulsen's interest in philanthropy and the civic needs of Washington and Idaho make him a notable character in the history of the Inland Pacific Northwest. He is perhaps best remembered within Spokane for the two downtown buildings he constructed that bear his name. Paulsen died in 1927 and was buried in the Riverside Memorial Park in Spokane, Washington.

== Paulsen Center ==
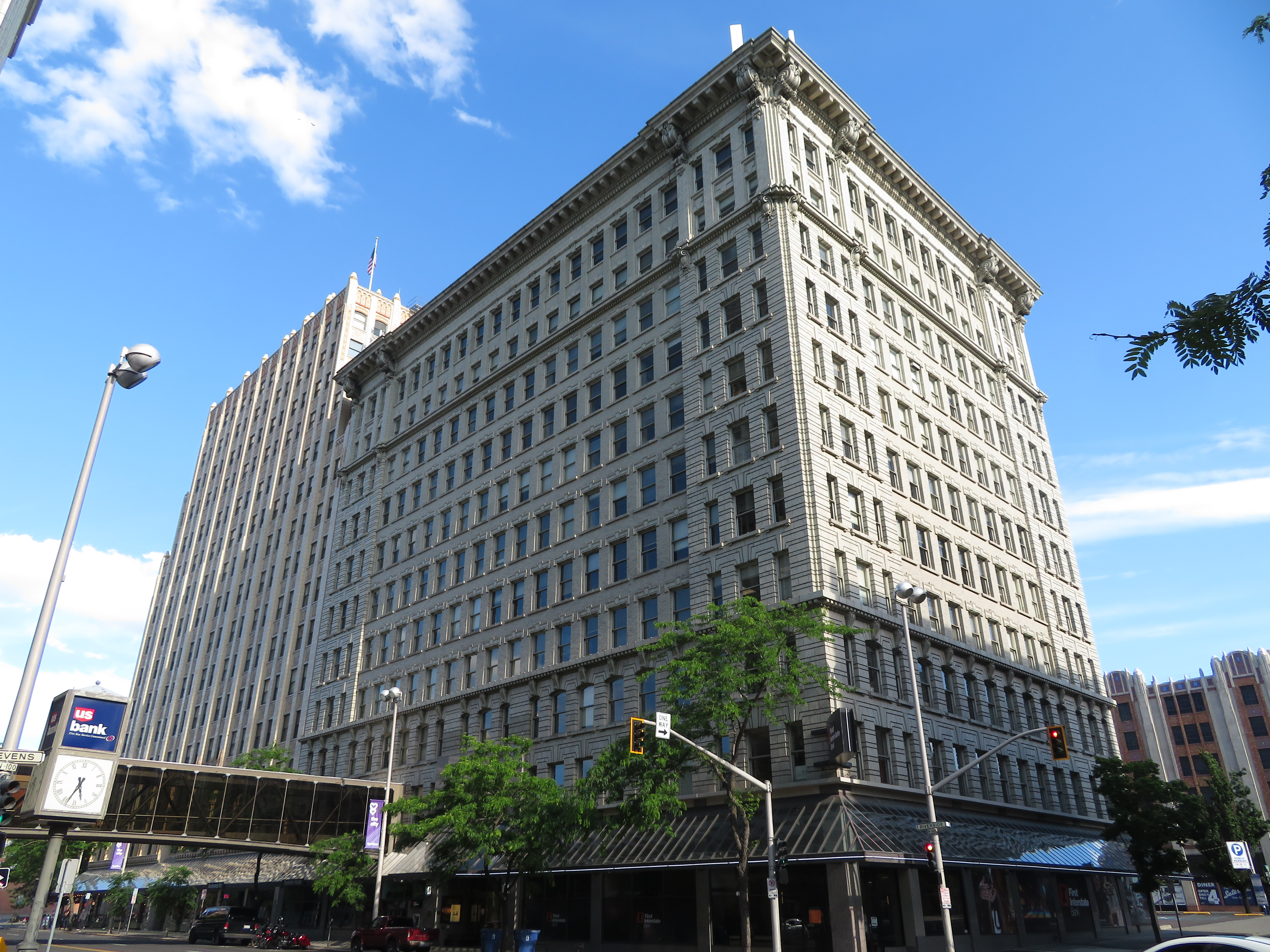
Paulsen Center with August Paulsen Building (right) and Paulsen Medical and Dental Building (left)

=== August Paulsen Building ===
The August Paulsen Building was designed by architects Dow and Hubbell, partners John Kennedy Dow and Clarence Z. Hubbell, and built from 1908 to 1911 by the Fredrick Phair Company. It used the then new form of steel construction which allowed the 11-story building to become the tallest building in Spokane, at the time.

=== Paulsen Medical and Dental Building ===
The Paulsen Medical and Dental Building was designed by Gustav Pehrson and built adjacent to the August Paulsen Building. Built between 1928 and 1929, together they are referred to as the Paulsen Center. The Medical and Dental Building is a 15-story Art Deco style skyscraper, with Spanish Moor styled exterior. This building, not completed until after Paulsen's death, includes distinctive penthouse in which Paulsen family members lived until 2007.

== Other sources ==
- Heritage From Heroes, Spokane's Dreamers & Builders (Chapter 49, "Dairying Dane Makes Mine Miracles" by Dorothy Rochon Powers. Fairmount Memorial Association; 1993)
