= The Davenport Hotel (Spokane, Washington) =

Hotel in Spokane, Washington, United States

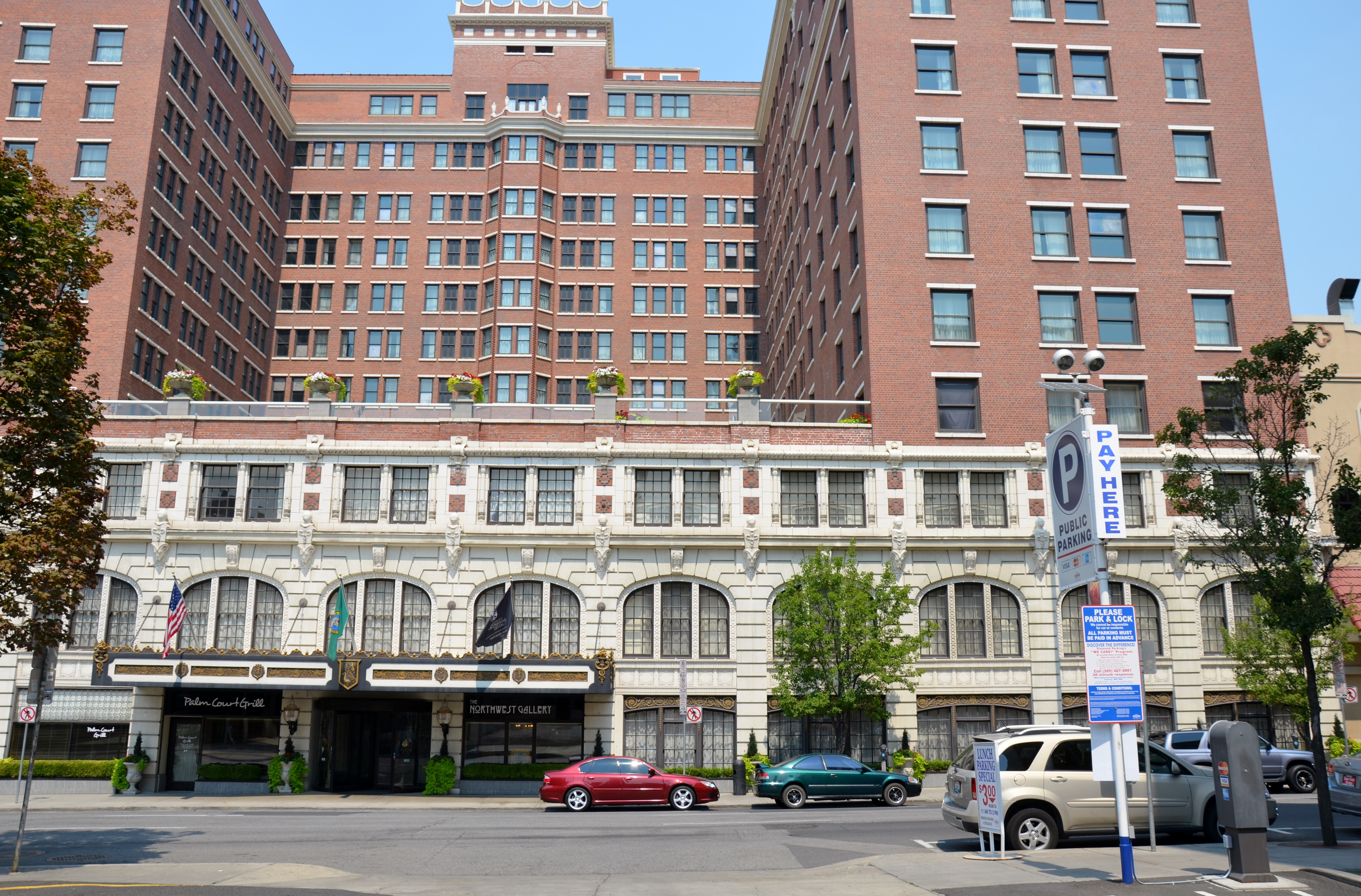
- The Historic Davenport Hotel
- Interactive map of the The Davenport Hotel area
- Hotel chain: Autograph Collection Hotels

General information
- Location: 10 South Post Street; Spokane, Washington, Washington, U.S.
- Coordinates: 47°39′24.5″N 117°25′27.65″W
- Opening: 1914
- Owner: KSL Capital Partners

Height
- Height: 157 feet (48 m)

Technical details
- Floor count: 14

Design and construction
- Architect: Kirtland Kelsey Cutter

Other information
- Number of rooms: 284
- Number of suites: 37
- Number of restaurants: 2

Website
- davenporthotelcollection.com
- The Davenport Hotel
- U.S. National Register of Historic Places
- Built: 1914
- Architectural style: Renaissance Revival/Spanish Revival
- NRHP reference No.: 75001874
- Added to NRHP: September 5, 1975

The Davenport Hotel is a historic hotel located in downtown Spokane, Washington, United States. Originally a successful high-end restaurant, it is one of the possible places where the first Crab Louis (reportedly named after Louis Davenport) was created and served. The hotel was designed by architect Kirtland Cutter, and built in 1914 for $2 million (approximately $200 million in today’s dollars). It was built with an opulent lobby, and new amenities for the time such as air conditioning, a central vacuum system, pipe organ, and dividing doors in the ballrooms. Commissioned by a group of Spokane businessmen to have a place to host and entertain their guests, the hotel is named after Louis Davenport, an influential businessman, the first proprietor and overseer of the project.

The hotel underwent expansions in 1917 and 1929 and in 1925, it became the broadcast studio for the newly relocated KHQ radio station. Davenport bought out all other interests in the hotel and became sole owner of the property in 1928 and owned the hotel until 1945, when he sold the hotel. After changing hands many times, the hotel was remodeled and re-positioned as a motel in the early 1960s. After another change in ownership in 1967 and their subsequent bankruptcy, the hotel was foreclosed on and the property slowly fell into disrepair. After several attempts at renovation by various groups, the property was facing demolition by the mid 1980s. In 2002, the hotel was bought for $6.5 million and completely restored in a $38 million ($68 million in 2025 dollars) renovation by developers Walt and Karen Worthy, reopening on July 15, 2002. The Davenport Hotel has 284 guest rooms and is rated as a Four-Diamond hotel by the American Automobile Association and as a 5-star hotel by the Northstar Travel Group. The hotel was listed on the National Register of Historic Places in 1975, and today it operates under the name The Historic Davenport Hotel within The Davenport Hotel Collection brand along with its three sister hotels and is affiliated with Marriott as part of their Autograph Collection Hotels chain.

== History ==
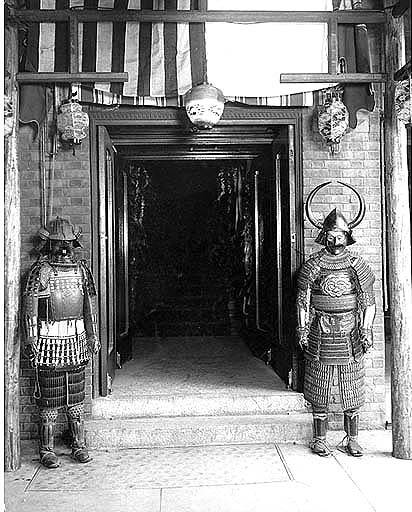
Davenport interior display for the Alaska Yukon Pacific Exposition in 1909

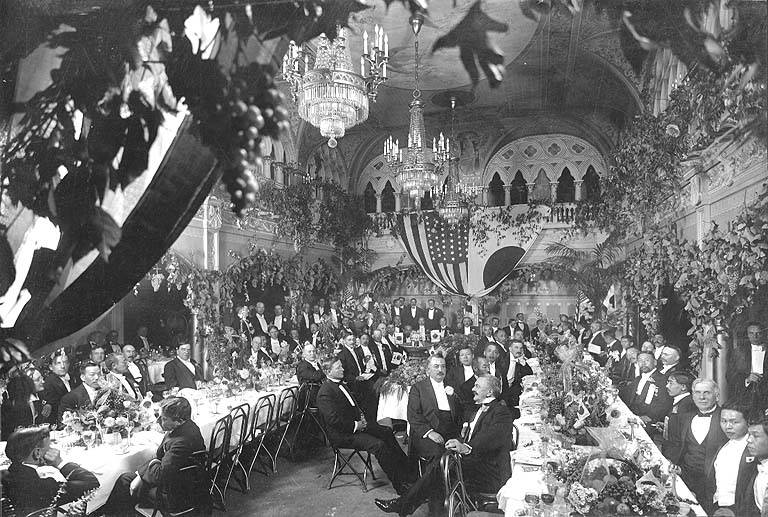
The banquet in honor of the Japanese Commercial Commission by the Spokane Chamber of Commerce in the Hall of Doges, 1909

=== Restaurant years ===
Lewellyn "Louis" Davenport came to Spokane Falls, Washington Territory, in the spring of 1889 at the age of 20. He had been a clerk in San Francisco and came up to Spokane to work the summer in his uncle's "Pride of Spokane Restaurant." The summer of 1889 was fateful for Spokane and for Louis Davenport. In August, a fire tore through the infant metropolis, turning 32 square blocks of civilization to ashes. Young Davenport salvaged what he could from the rubble, bought a tent, and opened "Davenport's Waffle Foundry." Davenport's restaurant is one of the possible places where the first Crab Louis (reportedly named after Louis Davenport) was created and served. Spokane rebuilt quickly after the big fire. Washington became a state that winter and Spokane dropped the Falls from its name. With timber, mining, agriculture and the railroad pouring money and people into the region, the city of Spokane was in the middle of it all and poised to become one of the great cities of the West.

Davenport recognized his opportunity and leased a brick building on the North-east corner of Sprague Avenue and Post Street the next year. He expanded his culinary offerings to nearly 100 items. Within a few years, Davenport's Restaurant was described by a critic as "the finest thing of the kind in the country." Business was so good, Davenport expanded into an adjoining building within a decade. He hired up-and-coming architect, Kirtland Cutter, to make the two buildings appear as one in 1904. Cutter offered a Mission Revival style theme. The white stucco walls and green tile roofs stood in marked contrast to every other building downtown. This remodel added the finest ballroom in the West on the second floor, the Hall of the Doges.

=== Construction of the hotel ===
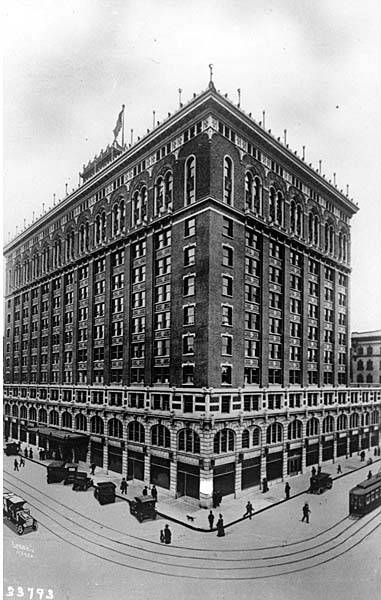
The Davenport, circa 1916

The Davenport Hotel was neither Louis Davenport's idea nor was it built with his money. Instead, Cutter and his firm, Cutter & Malmgren and Davenport were chosen by a group of leading Spokane businessmen, who thought the growing city required a large, grand hotel in which to board and entertain their guests. Leveraging Davenport's already strong reputation, the Davenport Hotel Company was formed in 1912 and preparation of the site began that year. The hotel tower went up in eight months in 1913, using horse carts, steam jacks and hand tools. Not a single worker was seriously injured or killed — a rarity for the time.

In the design, Cutter was instructed to make sure "no more money than necessary was squandered on exterior ornament", which resulted in a building with a relatively simple exterior with strategically placed ornamentation but an extremely extravagant interior. Built lavishly in the Renaissance Revival and Spanish Revival style, the 406-room Davenport Hotel cost two million dollars to complete and included new technologies at the time of its opening in September 1914, such as chilled water, elevators, and air cooling. Cutter and Davenport shopped the world for ideas and furnishings for their new hotel. Cutter, Karl G. Malmgren as well as the firm's superintendent of construction on the project, Gustav Albin Pehrson, designed the space drawing inspiration from the great architects of France, England and Spain and decorated the interior with luxurious appointments with fine art and tables dressed in Irish linens from Liddell and set with 15,000 pieces of silver (said to be the largest private commission for Reed & Barton). The hotel opened for business on September 1, 1914, and held its grand opening celebrations from September 17–19, 1914. Ever since then, the hotel has promoted itself as "one of America's exceptional hotels."

==== Lobby ====
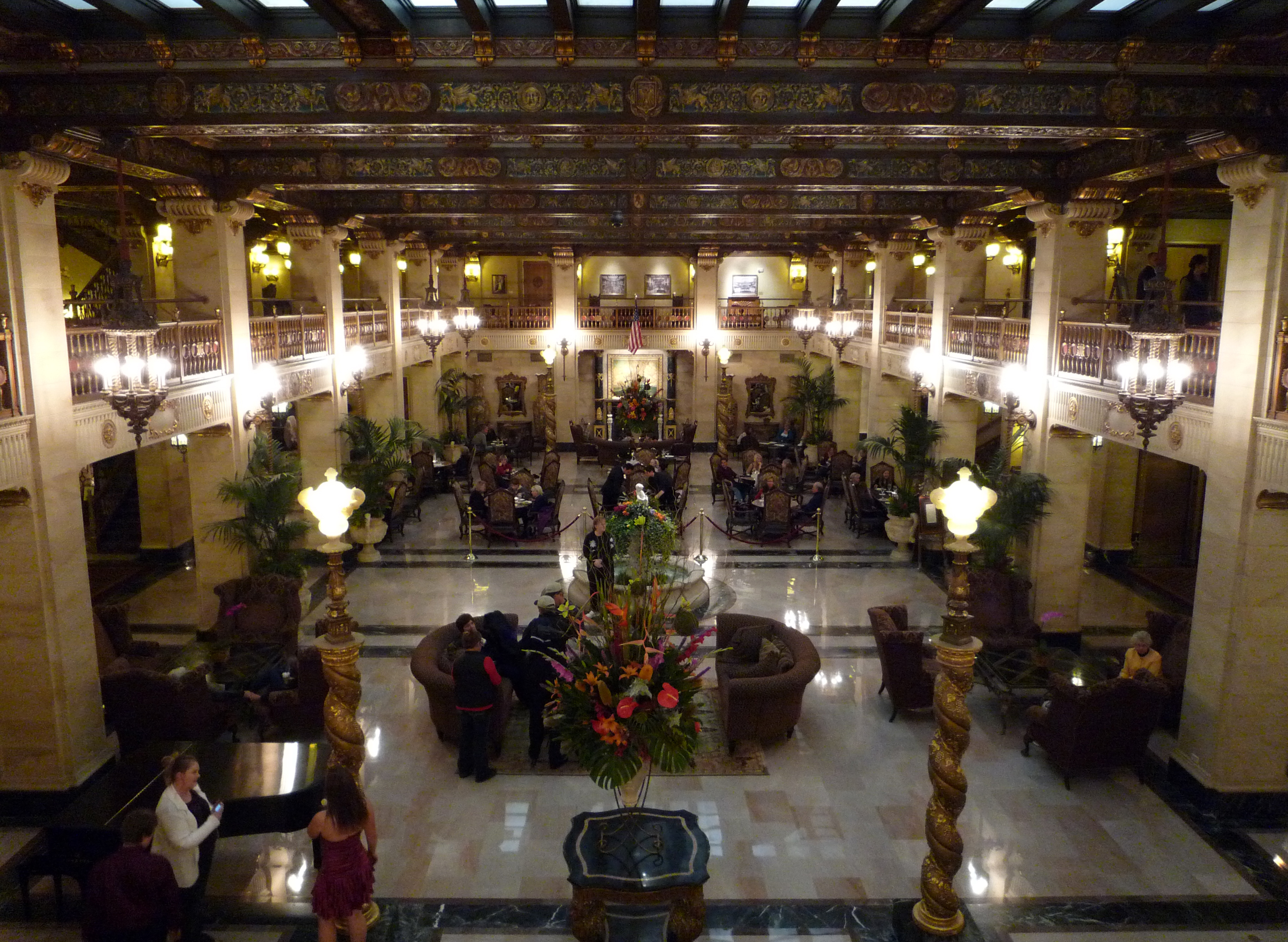
Ornate main lobby

The ornate hotel lobby has been referred to as "Spokane's living room", and in a 1921 edition of The Architect and Engineer the lobby was applauded by the author stating, there are "few if any finer lobbies in America". The first fire in the lobby fireplace was lit in September 1914 by Kirtland Cutter. Hotel proprietor Louis Davenport decreed that as a symbol of hospitality. Originally wood-burning, the fireplace now burns natural gas. The fireplace is kept burning year-round, as a symbol of hospitality and still following Mr. Davenport's request. The painting above the fireplace depicts the Niña, Pinta, and Santa María - the ships Christopher Columbus used to discover the New World in 1492. Architecturally, the hotel has elements of Italy, France, England, Spain, and Imperial Russia.

The lobby is inspired by the Spanish Renaissance style. The art glass panels in the ceiling give the hotel's single largest space an atrium effect. There is a separate glass roof above this one for protection. The ceiling beams are cast plaster with faux wood graining. Over time, much of the detail on these was lost to the eye due to decades of smoke in the lobby - both from the wood-burning fireplace and cigars/cigarettes. When the beams were cleaned in the renovation of 2000 - with spray bottles of Simple Green and toothbrushes - the burgundy, teal, and gold colors appeared as they were when new.

Mr. Davenport explained the hotel's iconography this way in 1915:

In the old Spanish homes it was the custom to display medallions carrying the portraits of honored ancestors and distinguished members of the family. This accounts for their frequent appearance throughout the lobby. Prominent in the ornamentation is the griffin. This, as used here, has the body of a lion, symbolic of strength, and the wings and head of an eagle, emblematic of alertness, swiftness and rapidity of execution. The dolphin, which figures in the ornamentation is always associated with mythology and sociability.

=== Hotel years ===
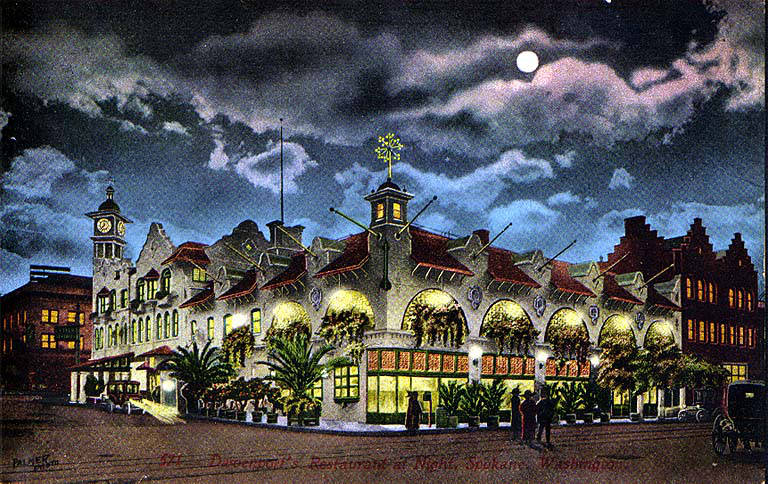
Depiction of Davenport's Restaurant, ca. 1912

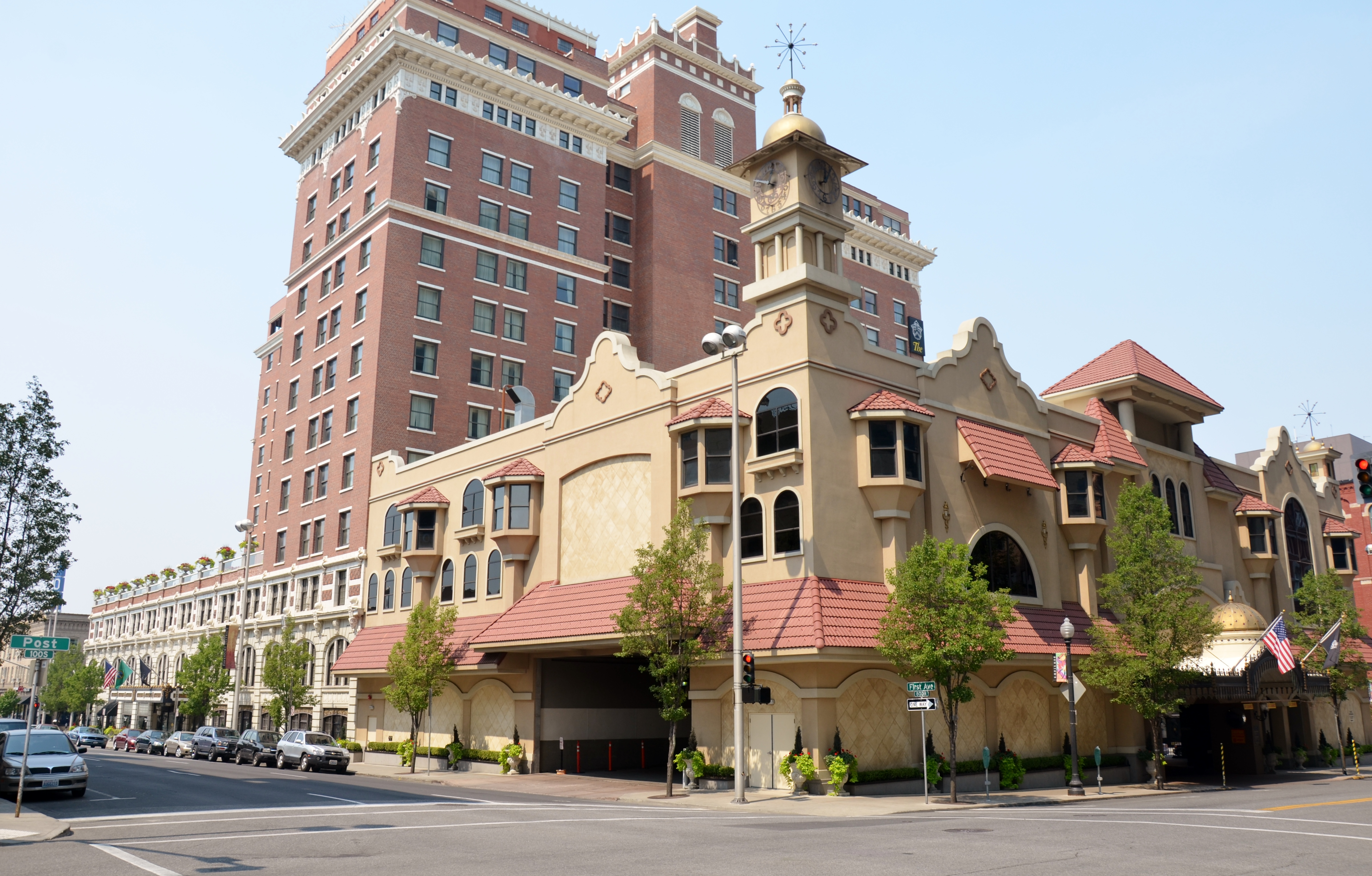
The Davenport Hotel at Post and First, 2015

The hotel was so successful that a 53-room addition was constructed in 1917, followed by an eleven-story addition on the south side in 1929, containing 80 more rooms.

The Davenport Hotel was home to one of the Pacific Northwest's earliest commercial radio stations. KHQ, which signed on the air in Seattle in late February 1922, was relocated to Spokane in September 1925, and went on the air from the Davenport on October 30 of that year. From its tower on the roof of the hotel, KHQ broadcast the first voices many people pulled from the air across the vast expanses of the Inland Northwest. KHQ featured many popular local bands, including Brill's Orchestra, led by cellist Leonardo Brill; his band, which was heard on radio on numerous occasions, performed for KHQ during the station's debut program. Also noteworthy were The Musicaladers, which included a young Harry "Bing" Crosby. KHQ radio remained a strong voice on the air for more than half a century; it was sold off by its original owners in 1985 and is today's KQNT, though later sister television station KHQ-TV remains under the same ownership.

In 1928, Louis Davenport bought out the hotel's other stockholders. On April 26, 1945, Davenport sold the hotel and the restaurant to the William Edris Company of Seattle, for $1.5 million. Edris sold the property two years later, in 1947, to a group of three Spokane investors. The following year, two of them sold their interest to three other investors. Seattle-based Western Hotels bought out three of the investors in 1949, and bought out the fourth investor in 1953. Davenport died in his suite at the hotel in 1951; his wife Verus in 1967.

Western Hotels remodeled the Davenport in the early 1960s and re-positioned it as a motel, with a motor entrance. In 1967, the owners, by that point renamed Western International Hotels, sold the Davenport to San Francisco-based John S. McMillan for $2.6 million. McMillan sold the hotel two years later, in 1969, to Basin Industries, which announced renovation plans, but then went bankrupt in 1972 when one of its owners was convicted of securities fraud. The hotel was foreclosed on by their lenders, Dallas-based Lomas & Nettleton, one of the nation's largest mortgage bankers. In 1979, former Montana governor Tim Babcock bought the hotel for $4.25 million, along with Warren Anderson, a former General Manager of the hotel. Anderson sold his interest to Babcock in 1983. Babcock had to surrender ownership of the financially ailing property back to Lomas & Nettleton in 1985, which closed the hotel immediately. Lomas & Nettleton went bankrupt in 1989.

Demolition of the hotel was considered by the 1980s after it had been shuttered; by the time the Davenports' only son died in 1987, it was generally believed that the Davenport Hotel would be destroyed. A demolition crew determined the entire block could be dropped in 20 seconds. The asbestos abatement industry was still in its early years, though, and it was then considered cost-prohibitive to clear the property of all asbestos, then raze the building without incurring a significant loss on the sale of the real estate after. A citizens' group called Friends of the Davenport was founded in 1986 by City Council member (and future Spokane mayor) Sheri Barnard, with the goal of saving the hotel. They held annual fund raisers in the lobby of the shuttered hotel and sought a buyer to restore it. In 1990, they found a potential savior, in Hong Kong businessman Patrick Wai-Meng Ng. His Sun International Hotels & Properties bought the hotel for $5.25 million. Ng began phased renovations, including the restoration of the lobby's skylight, but was unable to reopen the property.

=== Restoration and reopening ===
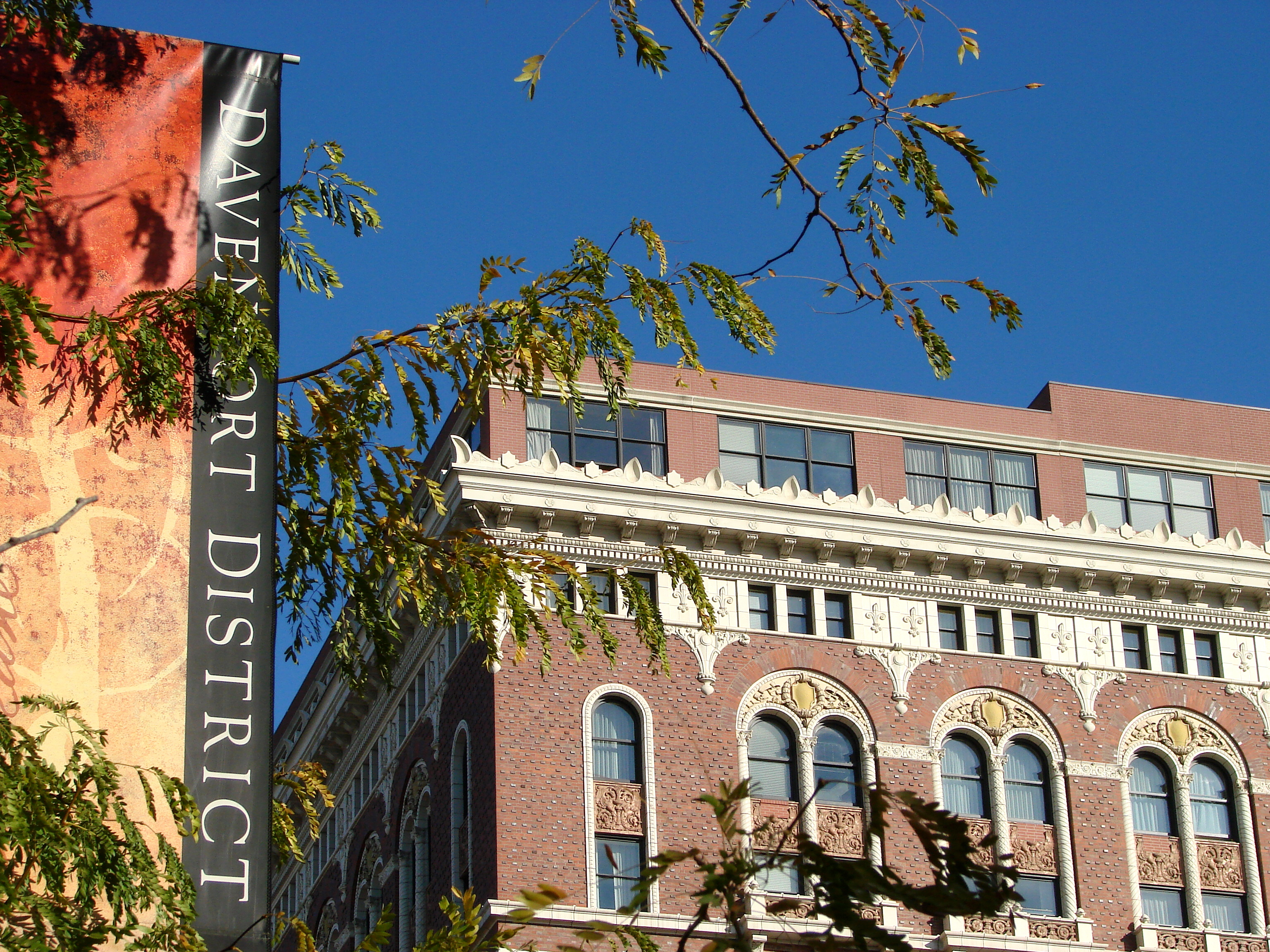
The restored Davenport Hotel is an integral part of the Davenport Arts District in Downtown Spokane

In March 2000, local entrepreneurs Walt & Karen Worthy purchased the entire city block for $6.5 million, then spent two years and $38 million ($68 million in 2025 dollars) of their own money to restore The Davenport. The hotel's public spaces and ballrooms were restored to their original appearance, with real gold leaf around the fireplace. The hotel's guest floors were stripped to bare concrete and rebuilt, with fresh wiring, plumbing, drywall, furniture and fixtures. Salvaging the Hall of Doges from the old structure required the removal of the whole ballroom intact by crane and placing it on the second floor of the hotel's new east addition just outside the Grand Pennington ballroom.

The Davenport Hotel reopened on July 15, 2002, and celebrated its grand reopening from September 13–15, 2002, with the ringing of a ship's bell eight times signaling a change of the watch.

== Facilities ==
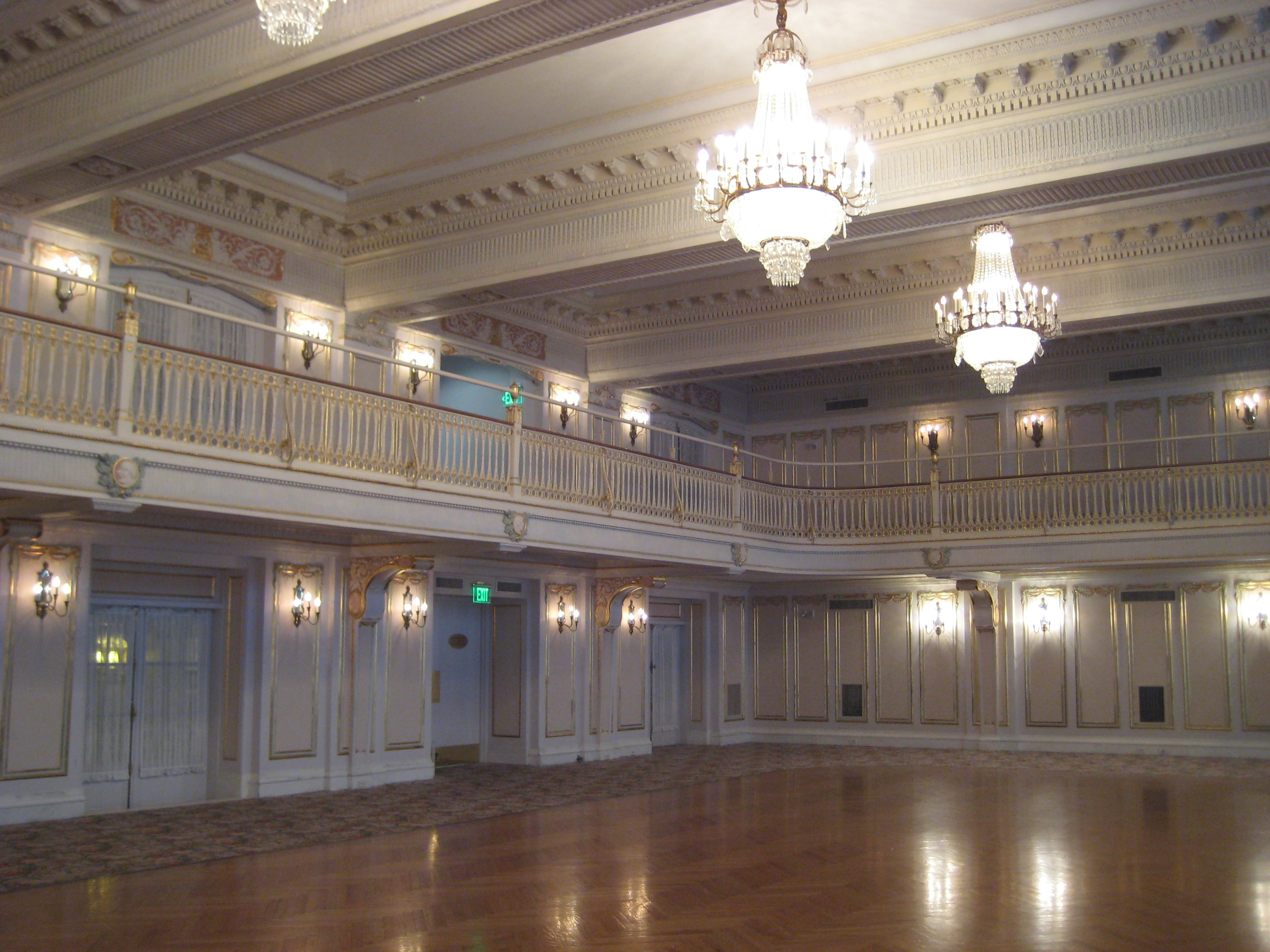
Marie Antoinette Ballroom

The Davenport Hotel has 284 guest rooms including 37 suites and has 8,000-square-foot (740 m^{2}) of exhibit space and is equipped with 22 meeting rooms totaling 36,836-square-foot (3,422.2 m^{2}) of meeting space. The guest rooms range from 300-square-foot (28 m^{2}) for a standard guest room to 2,360-square-foot (219 m^{2}) for the Presidential Suite. and the meeting rooms range in size from the 6,253-square-foot (580.9 m^{2}) Grand Pennington Ballroom to the 2,200-square-foot (200 m^{2}) Elizabethan Room.

The Historic Davenport has two restaurants, the Palm Court Grill and the Peacock Lounge for dining options as well as an espresso bar. For recreation, the hotel has a health club, spa, indoor pool, and whirlpool as well as a small museum that details the history of the Davenport Hotel. The building has an LEED Gold rating and the hotel is rated as a Four-Diamond hotel by the American Automobile Association and as a 5 star hotel by the Northstar Travel Group.

== Notable guests and residents ==
The hotel has had many famous guests since it opened 111 years ago in 1914. The list of distinguished guests that have visited the hotel include many heads and former heads of state, singers and musicians, actors and actresses, artists, and other people that reached a level of fame. The hotel has hosted at least ten presidents (Theodore Roosevelt, William Howard Taft, Woodrow Wilson, Warren G. Harding, Calvin Coolidge, Herbert Hoover, Harry S. Truman, John F. Kennedy, Lyndon B. Johnson, Richard M. Nixon) one emperor, and one queen (Marie of Romania). Of the presidents, Taft, who had visited more than once, was particularly fond of the hotel and once told Louis Davenport, "This is home. This is the best hotel I was ever in."

Famous actors that have stayed at the hotel include Mary Pickford, Clark Gable, Steve McQueen, Rory Calhoun, John Carradine, Vincent Price, Raymond Burr, Bing Crosby, Bob Hope, Betty White, Rock Hudson, Jimmy Durante, Bob Barker, Ellen Drew, John Howard, Kay Francis, Ethel Barrymore, David Warfield, Jack Benny, Glenn Ford, Lynn Fontanne, Jim Nabors, Tom and Dick Smothers, and Cecil B. DeMille. Some of the famous musicians that have visited include John Philip Sousa, Harry Belafonte, Will Rogers, Victor Borge, Harry James, Les Brown, Lawrence Welk, Eddy Arnold, Johnny Cash, Ricky Nelson, Nat King Cole, Liberace, Tennessee Ernie Ford, Harry Lauder, The Lennon Sisters, The Kingston Trio, Peggy Lee, and Woody Guthrie. Guthrie, a folk singer, reportedly said of the hotel, "this is an awful nice hotel...just a little too fascisti to satisfy my higher ideals" before going out and playing his guitar on the streets.

Other notables include Babe Ruth and Charles Lindbergh. Poet Vachel Lindsay lived in room #1129 from 1924 until 1929, and was often seen writing in front of the lobby fireplace. There is even a myth that Mahatma Gandhi stayed at the hotel, though in fact he never visited the US.

=== In literature ===
In literature, the Davenport Hotel is the setting for an interview of a suspect by private investigator, Sam Spade in the 1930 novel, The Maltese Falcon by Dashiell Hammett. Hammett was also a real life visitor of the hotel.

== Gallery ==
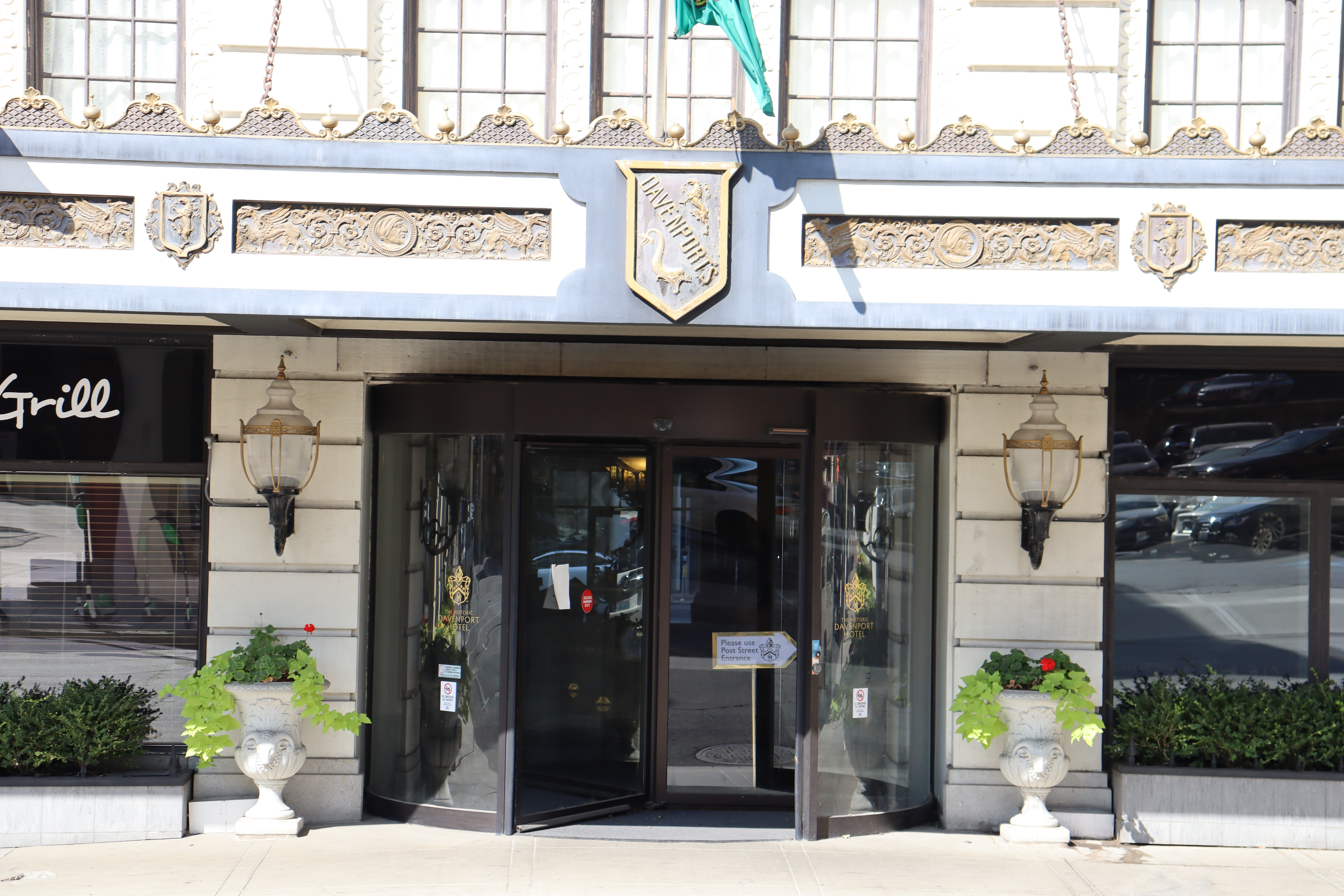
Detail of the entrance façade

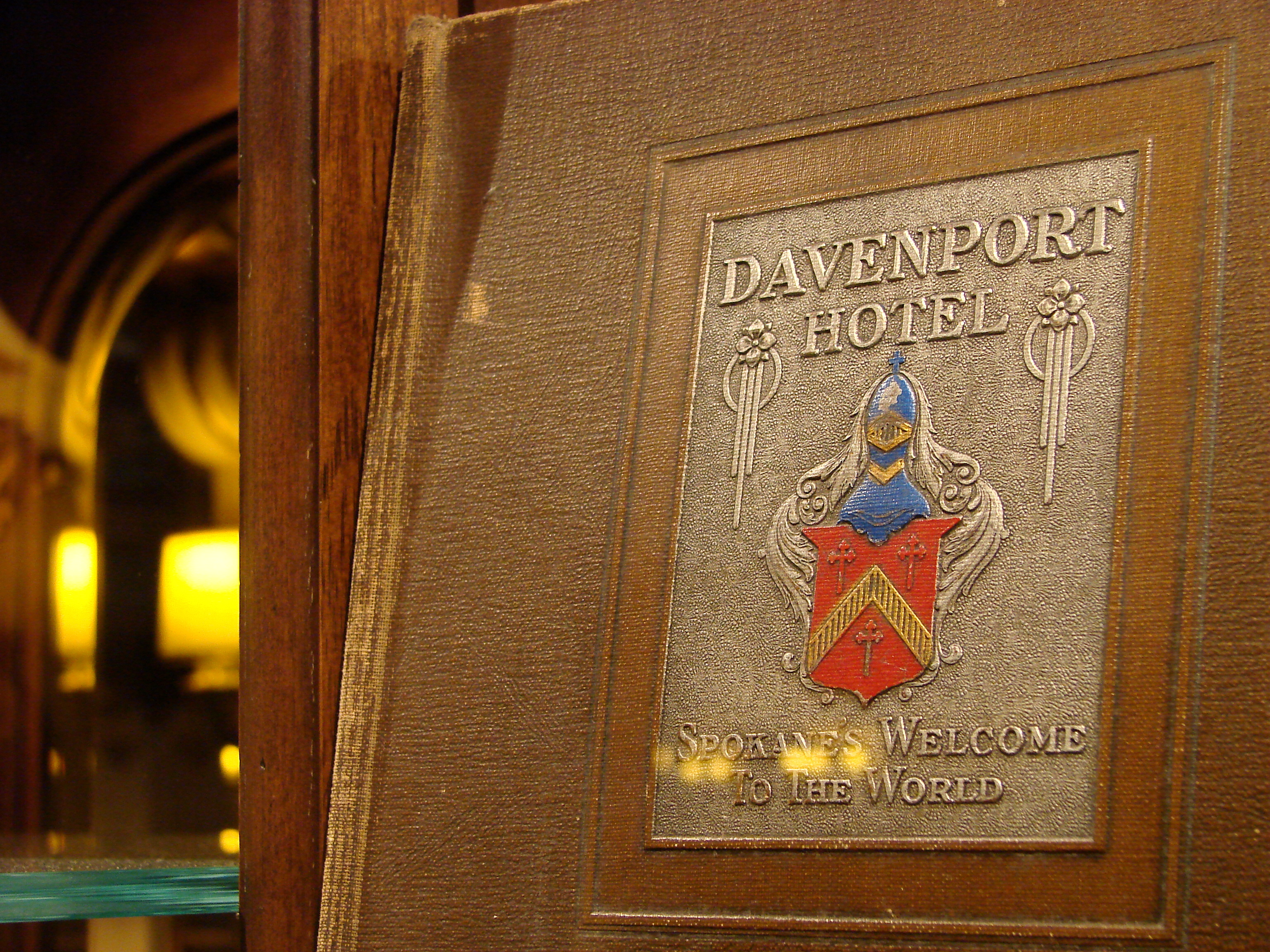
Plaque in the Davenport Hotel

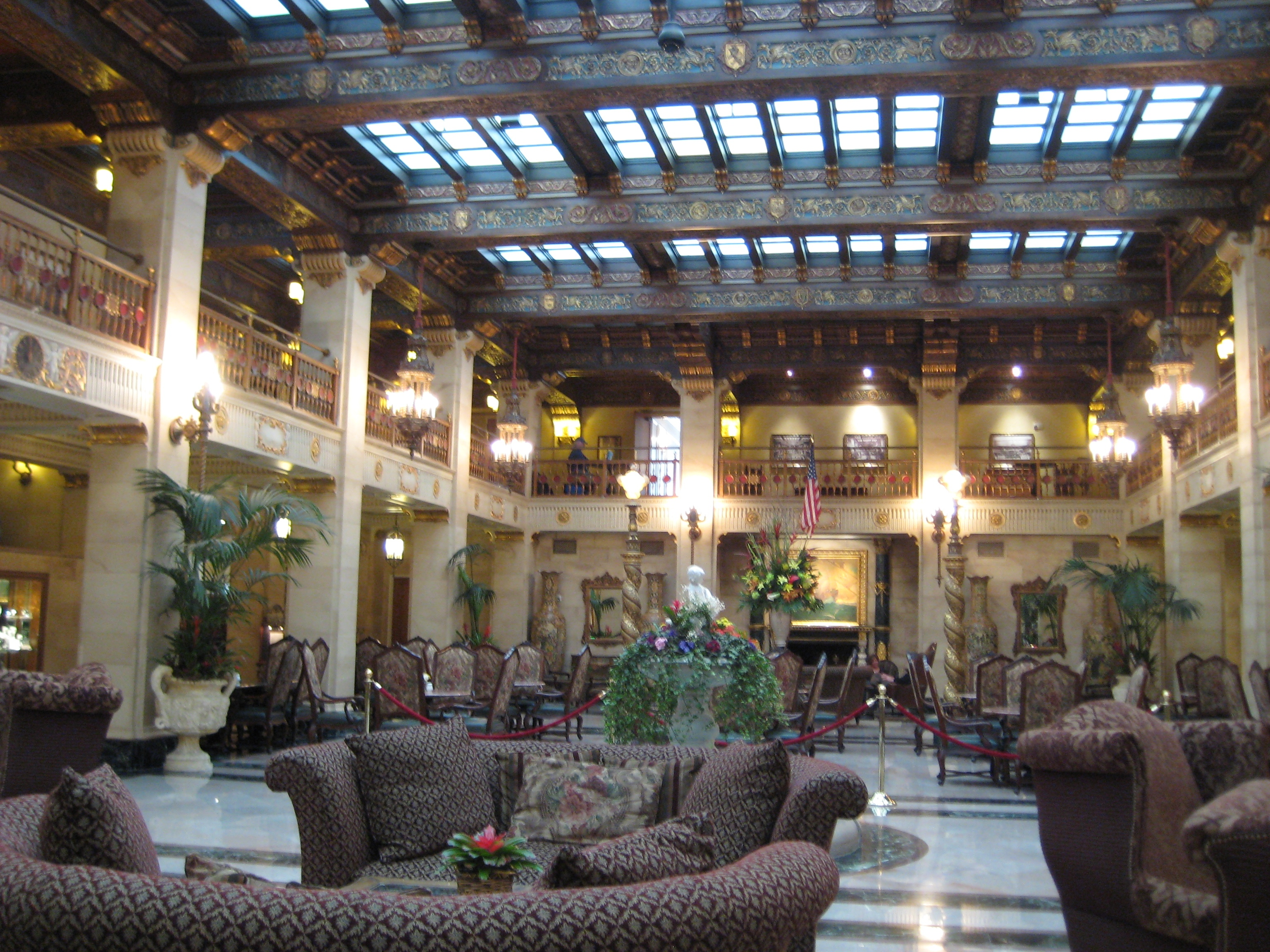
Lobby interior furnishings and decorations

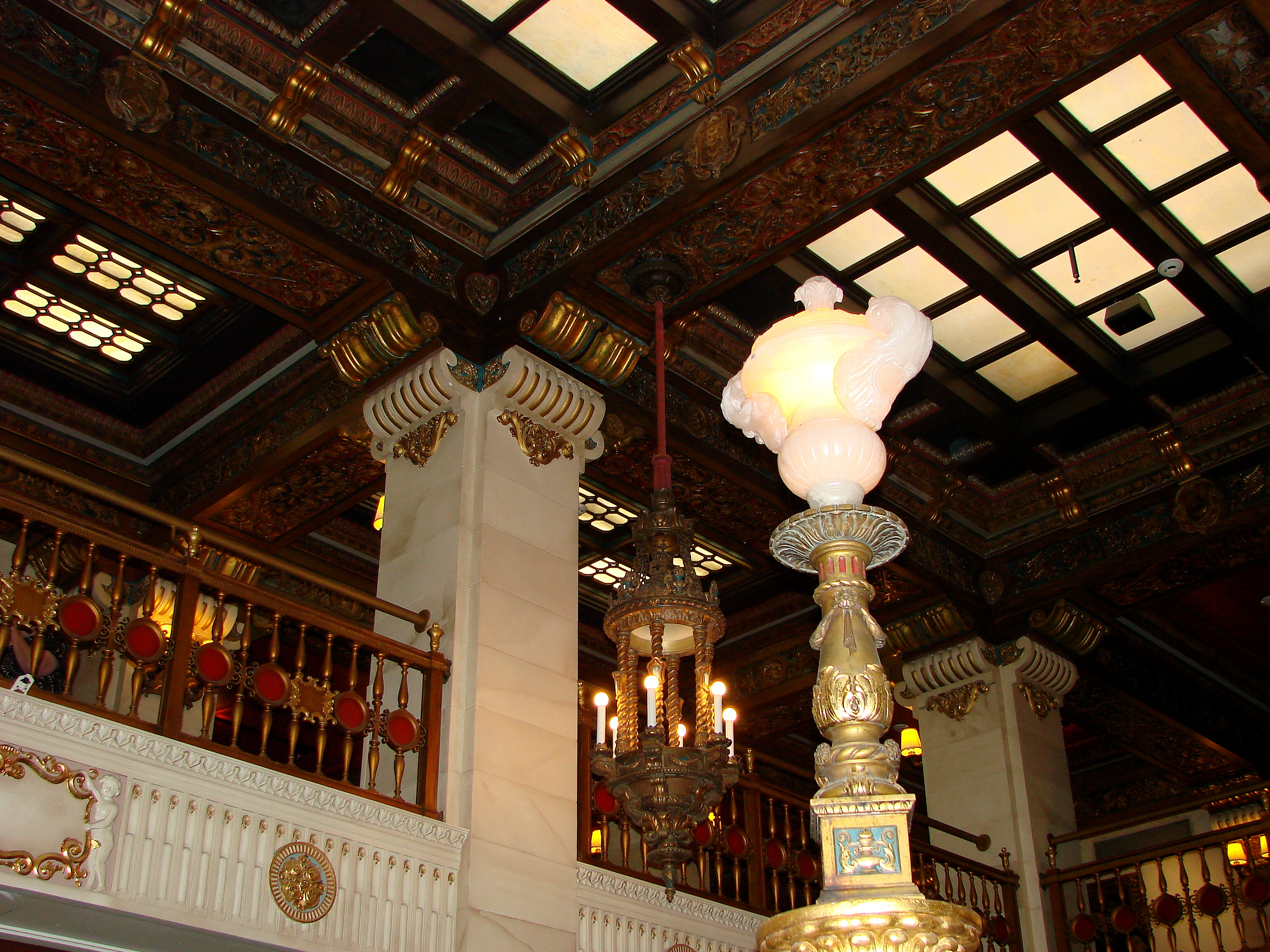
Lobby interior and roof

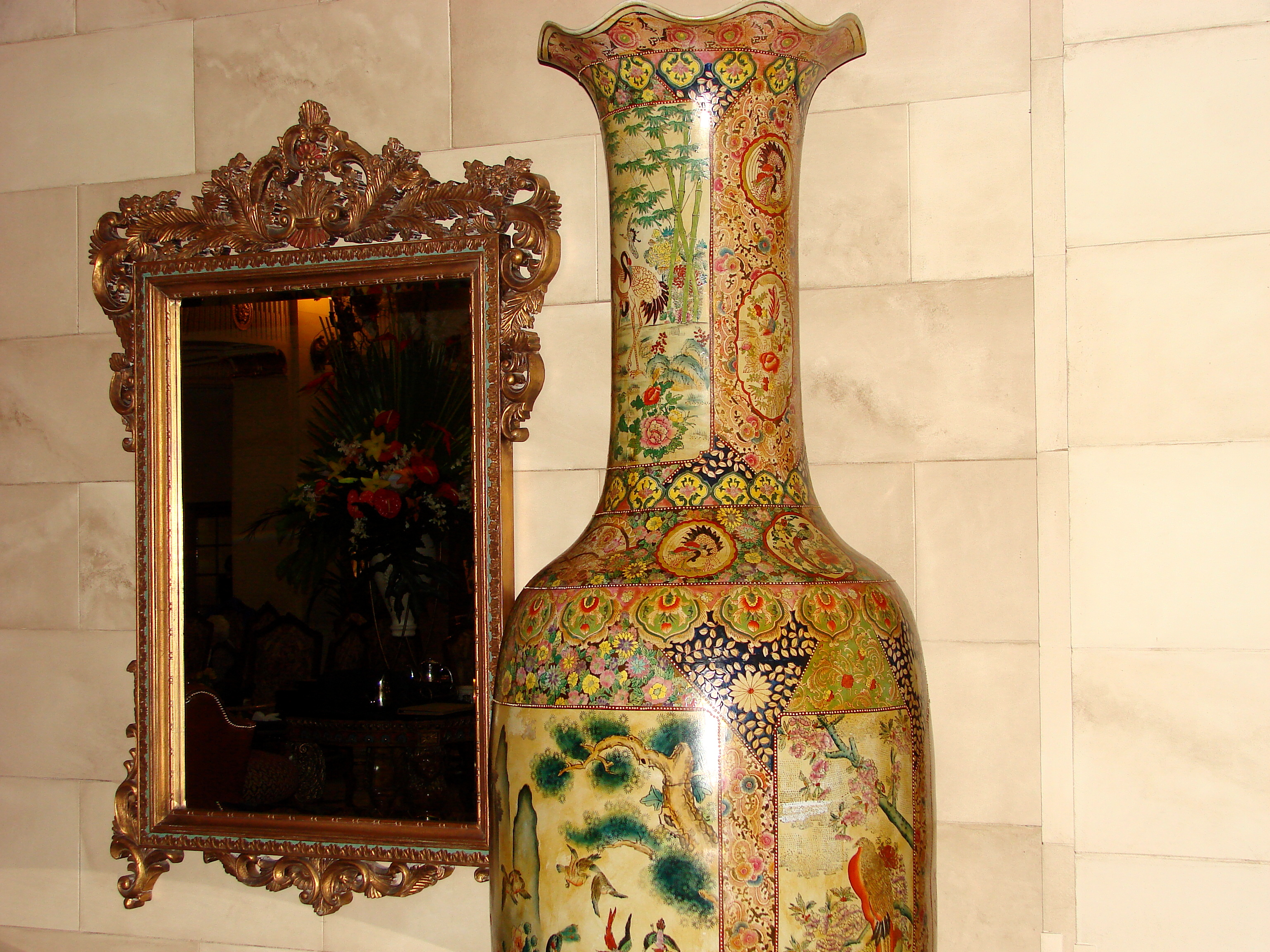
Decorative vase and mirror

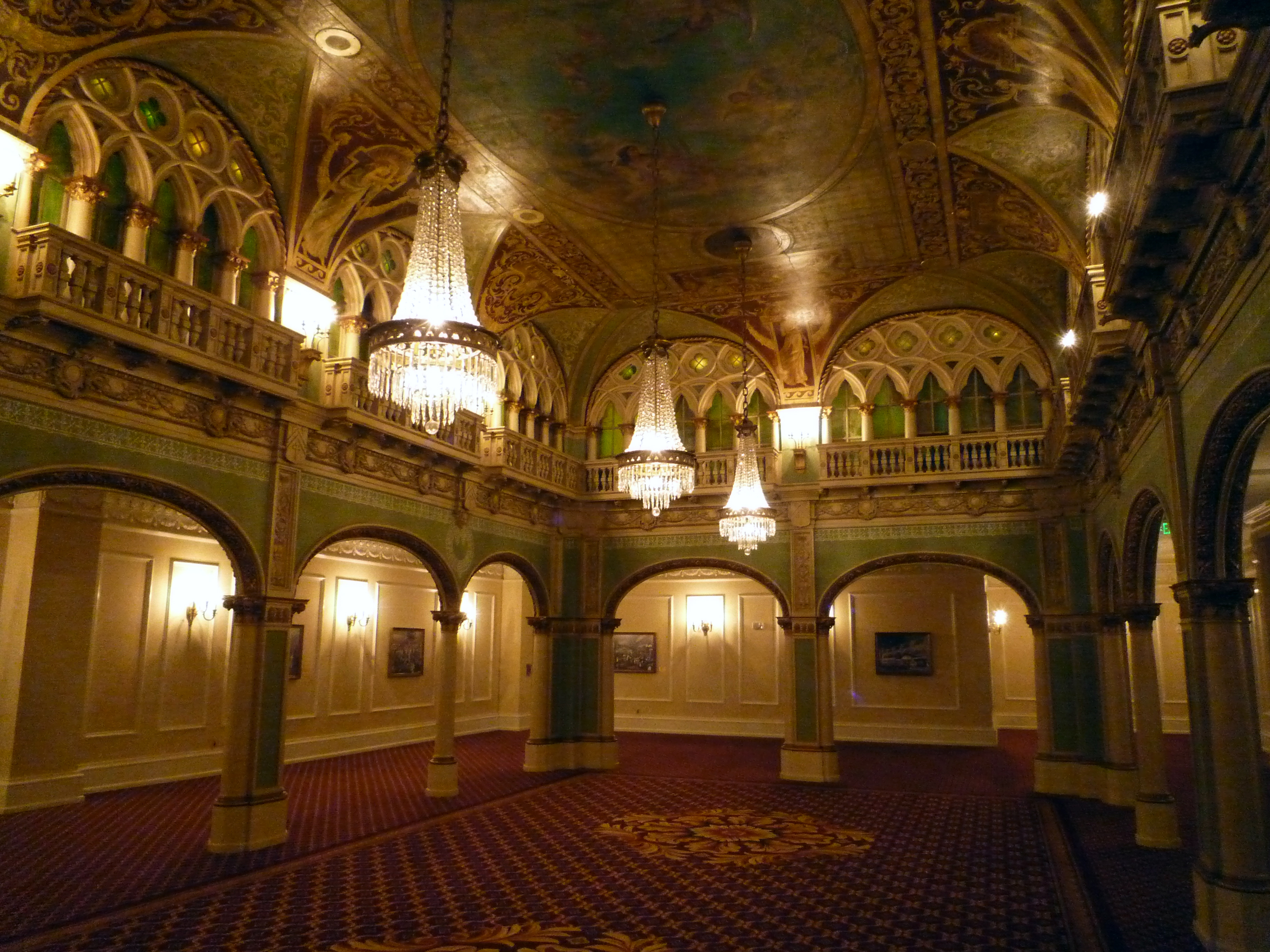
The Hall of Doges Ballroom

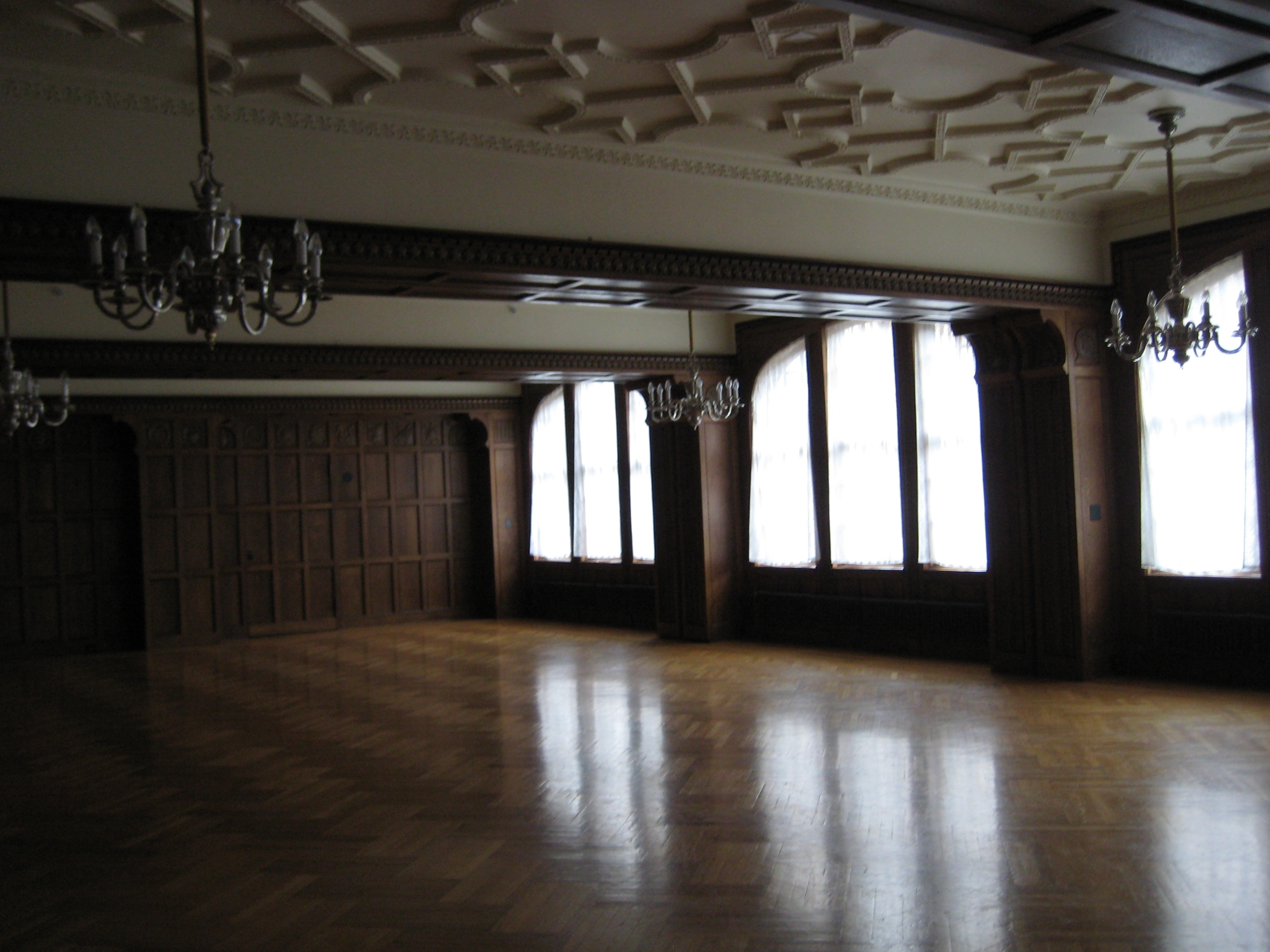
Elizabethan Room

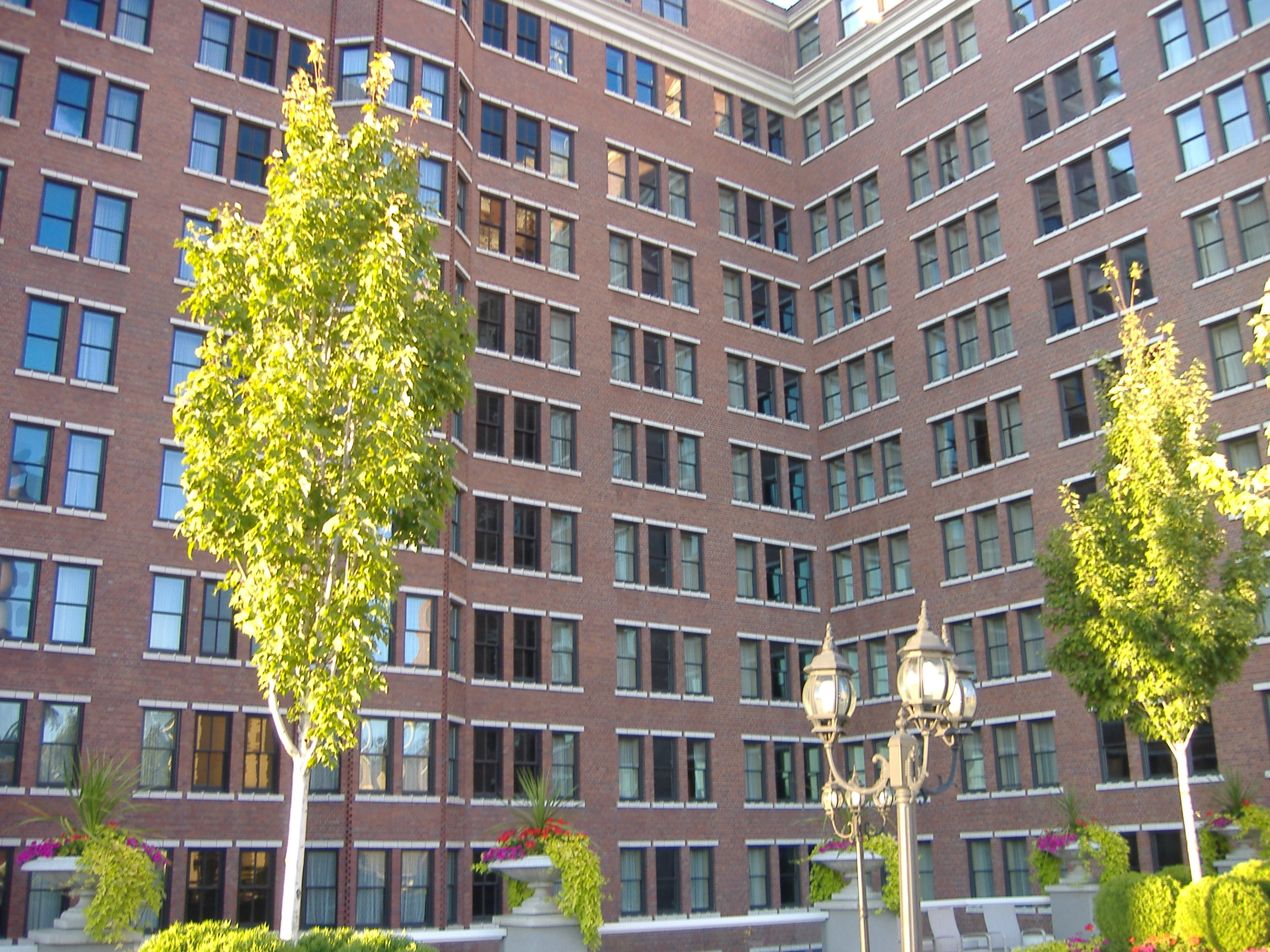
The terrace

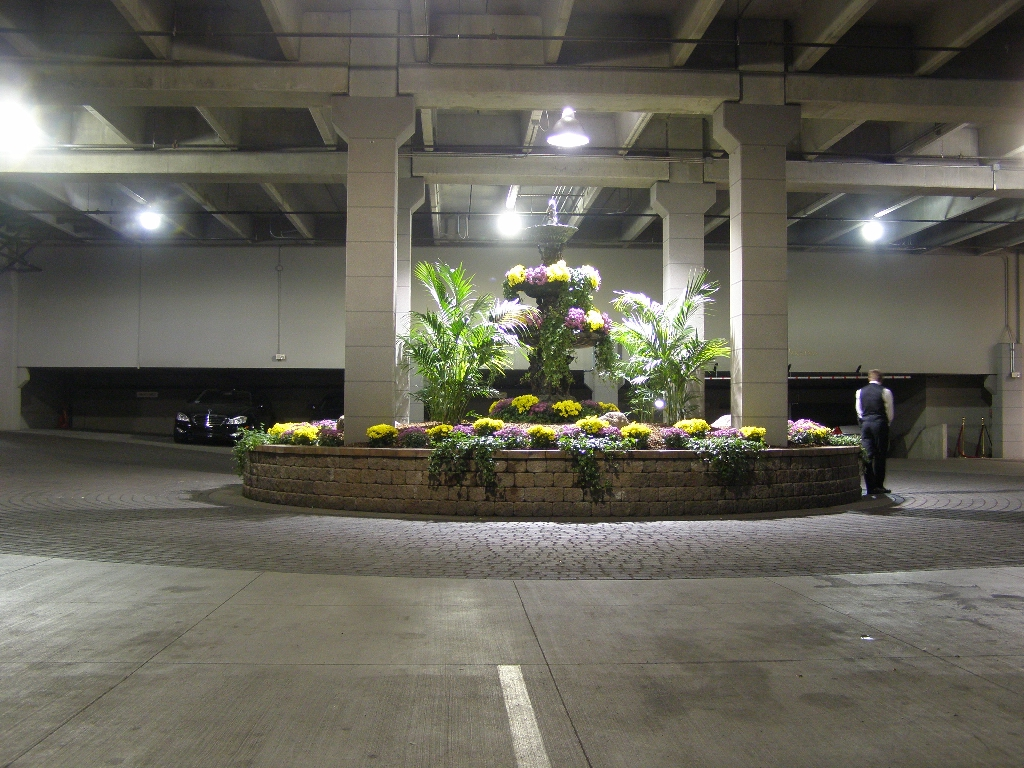
Parking garage
