= Downtown Spokane =

Downtown Spokane Sʎˈetkʷ Riverside
- Central business district of Spokane
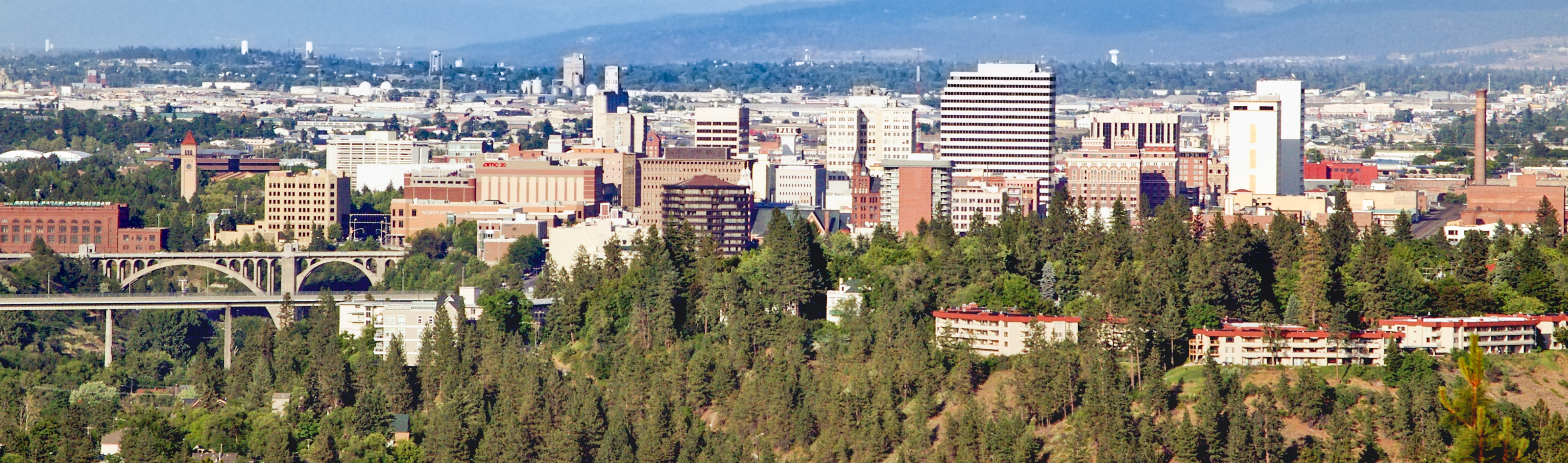
- Downtown skyline from the West in 2007

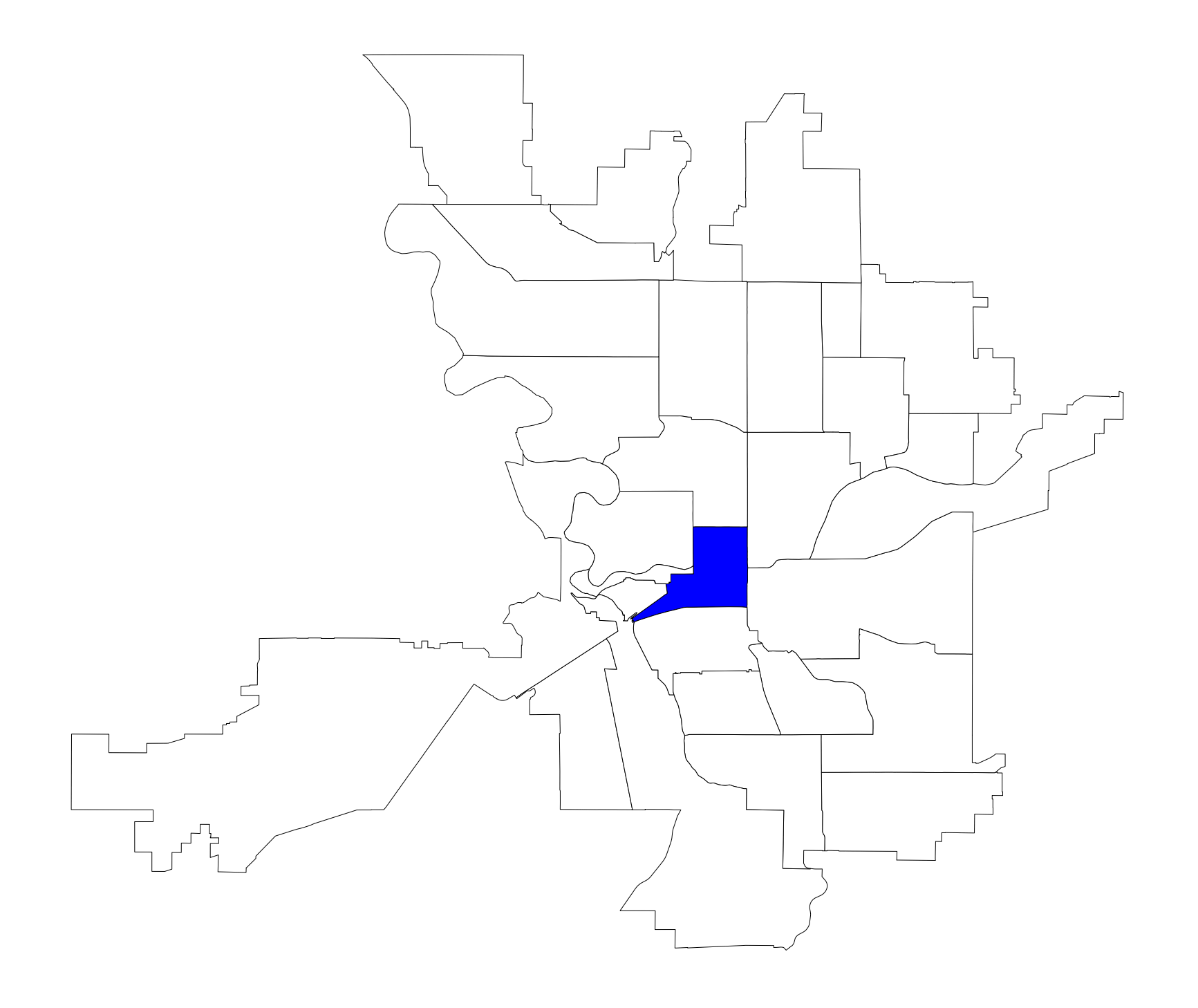
- Coordinates: 47°39′25″N 117°25′12″W
- Country: United States
- State: Washington
- County: Spokane County
- City: Spokane

Area
  - Total: 0.99 sq mi (2.6 km^{2})
- Elevation: 1,890 ft (580 m)

Population (2010)
  - Total: 3,071
  - Density: 3,100/sq mi (1,200/km^{2})
- ZIP Code: 99201, 99202
- Website: downtownspokane.org

Downtown Spokane or Riverside is the central business district of Spokane, Washington. The Riverside neighborhood is roughly bounded by I-90 to the south, Division Street to the east, Monroe Street to the west and Boone Avenue to the north. The topography of Downtown Spokane is mostly flat except for areas downstream of the Spokane Falls which are located in a canyon; the elevation is approximately 1,900 feet (580 m) above sea level.

Located at a traditional Interior Salish gathering place at the Spokane Falls, American settlement was established in 1871. Most of Spokane's notable buildings, historic landmarks, and high rises are in the Riverside neighborhood and the downtown commercial district, where many of the buildings were rebuilt after the Great Fire of 1889 in the Romanesque Revival style by architect Kirtland Kelsey Cutter. After experiencing periods of decline from Post-war suburbanization, the most recent following Expo '74, the neighborhood has become revitalized after the renovation of the River Park Square Mall in 1999, which has become the most prominent shopping center in the city. The chief attraction of downtown Spokane is Riverfront Park, a 100-acre (0.40 km^{2}) park just north Spokane's downtown core, it was created after Expo '74 and occupies the same site. The park hosts some of Spokane's largest events. The neighborhood is also the center of Spokane's governmental, hospitality, convention, and cultural facilities.

The neighborhood has a residential population of 3,071 people. The K-12 public education of the neighborhood is served by Spokane Public Schools and mass transportation throughout downtown and the Spokane area is provided by the Spokane Transit Authority (STA) which has its STA Plaza central hub in the city center and Amtrak's Empire Builder and Greyhound operate out of the Spokane Intermodal Center. Spokane's city streets use a grid plan that is oriented to the four cardinal directions with its origin point on the east end of downtown. Sprague Avenue splits the city into North and South and Division Street divides the city into East and West. Interstate 90 (I-90) runs east–west from Seattle, through downtown Spokane, and eastward through Spokane Valley, Liberty Lake, and onward to Coeur d'Alene and then Missoula.

== Geography ==
Street layout of the city center. The street grid breaks down in the South Hill due to the challenges of the terrain

The Riverside neighborhoods is bounded by I-90 to the south, Division Street to the east, Monroe Street (north of the Spokane River), West Riverside Avenue, and Sunset Boulevard (south of the Spokane River) to the west, and Boone Avenue to the north. Boone Avenue is where most of the city's governmental functions and other public facilities are located. The commercial district or "downtown core" comprises the portion of the Riverside neighborhood south of the Spokane River and east of Monroe Street. The topography of Downtown Spokane is mostly flat except for areas downstream of the Spokane Falls which are located in a canyon; the elevation is approximately 1,900 feet (580 m) above sea level. South of Downtown slopes up to the Lower South Hill, quite steeply in some places such as Pioneer Park, where long cliffs oriented east–west provide great views of Downtown, the North Side and Spokane Valley to the east.

Downtown Spokane straddles Sprague Avenue, which divides the city into North and South and on the eastern end of Downtown, Division Street, which splits the city into East and West. Infrastructure such as the railroad tracks and Interstate 90 cause noticeable obstructions to the continuity of the built environment and neighborhood. The presence of the railroad separates parts of the downtown core and creates a long, straight, and often blighted alleyway called "Railroad Alley" between 1st and 2nd Avenue between Wall Street and Adams Street; since the alleyway is wider than typical, many see potential in the space and the community has discussed it as a possible place for pocket parks or even a pedestrian or alternative transportation retail corridor with murals. Railroad Alley/Avenue was where the Northern Pacific tracks used to be located. Interstate 90 is elevated through almost all of downtown, often with parking lots underneath, but occasional blocks are solid cement, forming a barrier at the southern end of Downtown.

=== Districts and areas ===
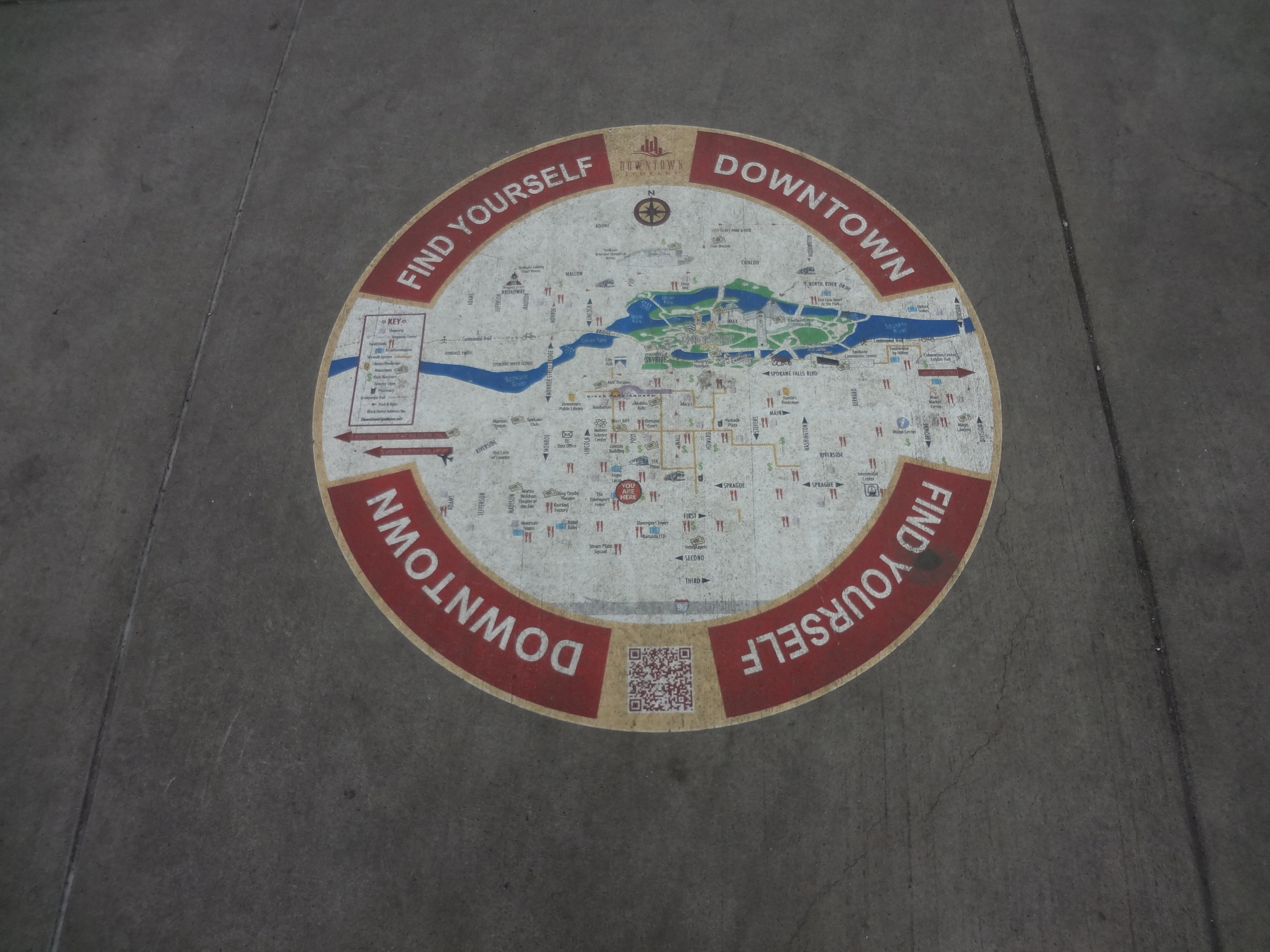
A sidewalk map of points of interest and nearby neighborhoods

Immediately south of the Interstate, the high density area continues into the Lower South Hill and what is known as the Medical District where Spokane's major health-care facilities are located, including Spokane's two largest hospitals, Sacred Heart and Deaconess.

To the west is the National Historic District of Browne's Addition, one of Spokane's oldest neighborhoods as well as the most population dense. Although they have an almost identical number of residents, Browns Addition has more than double the population density of Riverside with more than 8,000 residents per square mile. It is noted for its array of old mansions built by Spokane's early elite in the Queen Anne and early American Craftsman styles.

Across the river from Gonzaga and directly east of downtown is the University District, which has branch campuses of Eastern Washington University and Washington State University. Division Street separates Downtown from the University District. Also included in the University District is the Gonzaga University campus, located on the north bank of the river.

Aside from location, Spokane's city center has many areas that can be distinguished by belonging to one or more districts with a theme, where there is a cluster of similar buildings or businesses, some more defined than others. Examples of these areas and districts include the downtown core, the Davenport District, Riverfront Park, and the "Cork District", and the areas surrounding the Spokane Convention Center and Spokane Arena, which are feature a heavy presence of public venues for convention and sport activities that are maintained by the Spokane Public Facilities District.

==== Riverfront Park ====
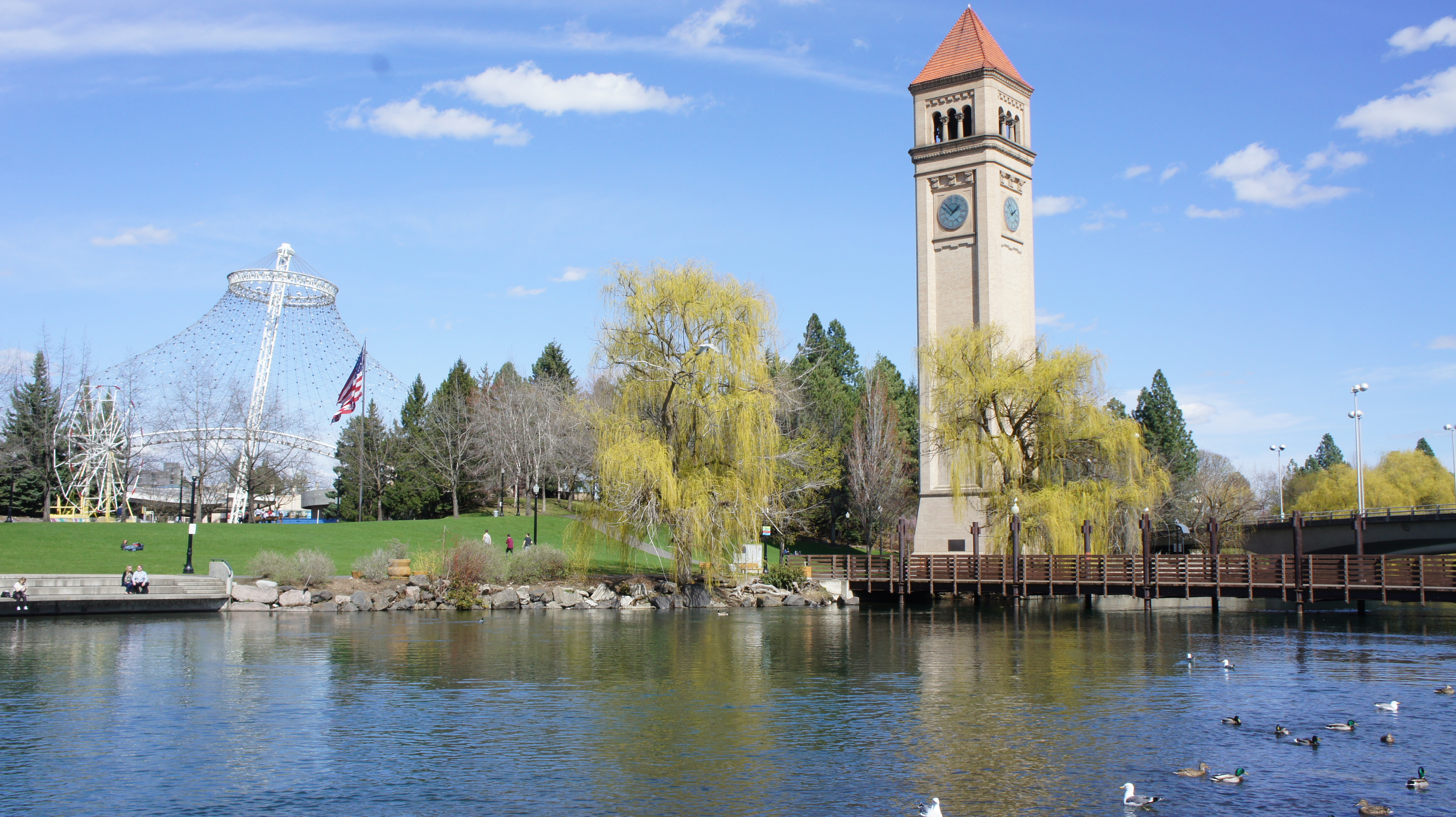
The Great Northern clock tower and U.S. Pavilion in Riverfront Park

Riverfront Park is a 100 acres (0.40 km^{2}) park just north of Downtown Spokane. Also located in Riverside, the park is the site of some of Spokane's largest events. The park has views of the Spokane Falls, and holds a number of civic attractions, including a Skyride that is a rebuilt gondola that carries visitors across the falls from high above the river gorge, a 5-story IMAX theater, and a small amusement park (which is converted into an ice-skating rink during the winter months) with numerous rides and concessions. The park is host to a full schedule of family entertainment and events such as the Bloomsday Post-Race Celebration, Hoopfest, Spokane Music Festival, Pig-Out in the Park, Restaurant Fair, Pow Wow, First Night Spokane, plus many outdoor concerts and other community activities. The Park also includes a hand-carved carousel created in 1909 by Charles I. D. Looff as a wedding present for his daughter. The carousel still operates in Riverfront Park, where riders can participate in an old-time ring toss. The carousel continues to offer a free ride to the rider who grabs the brass ring. Riverfront Park extends to the north bank of the river where the North Bank park features an ice age floods themed playground, Hoopfest basketball courts, the Skate and Wheels Park, and a climbing boulder as well as the Howard Street Promenade which showcases ample views of the Spokane falls and other water features (some man-made) of the Spokane River.

==== Downtown Core ====
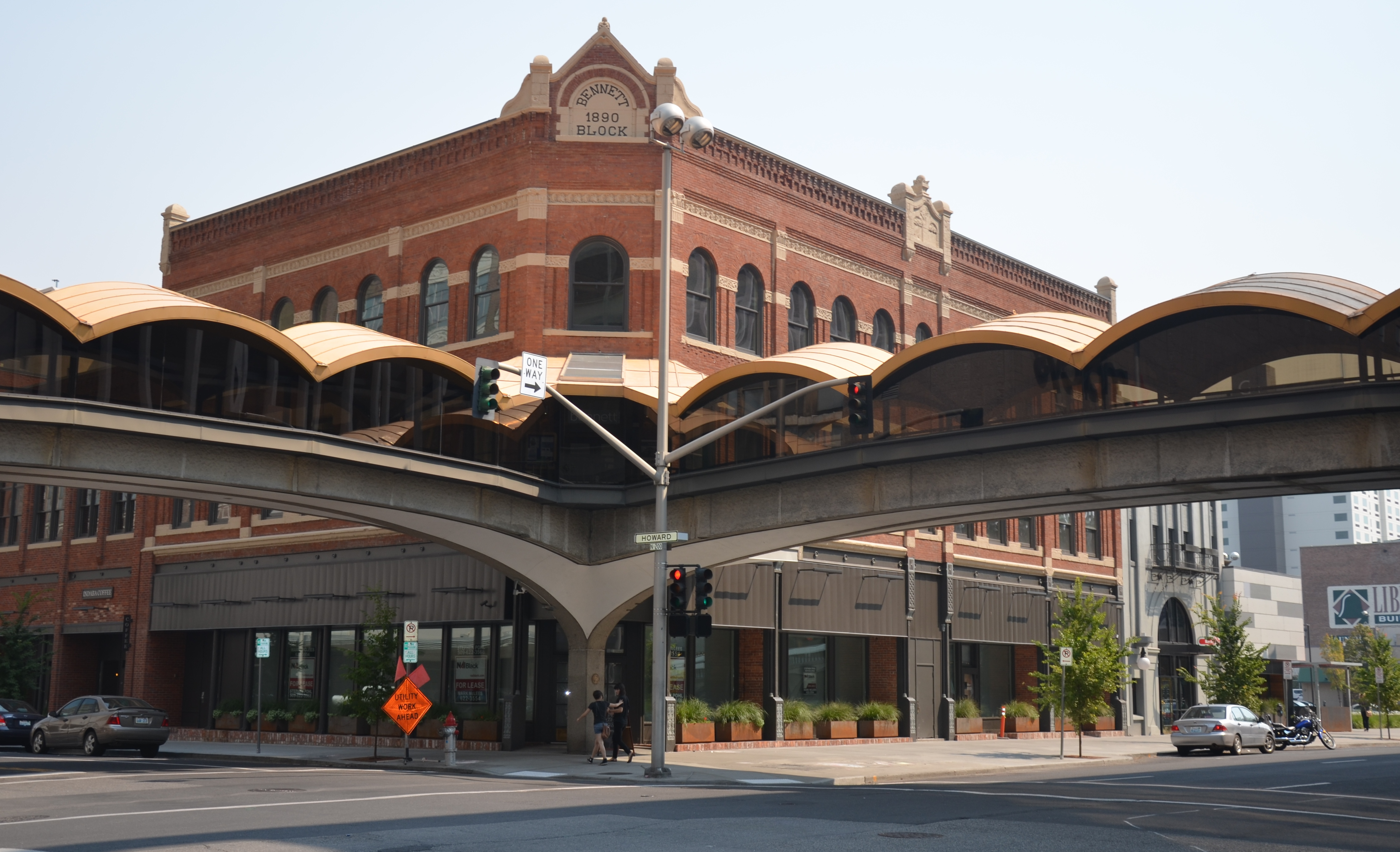
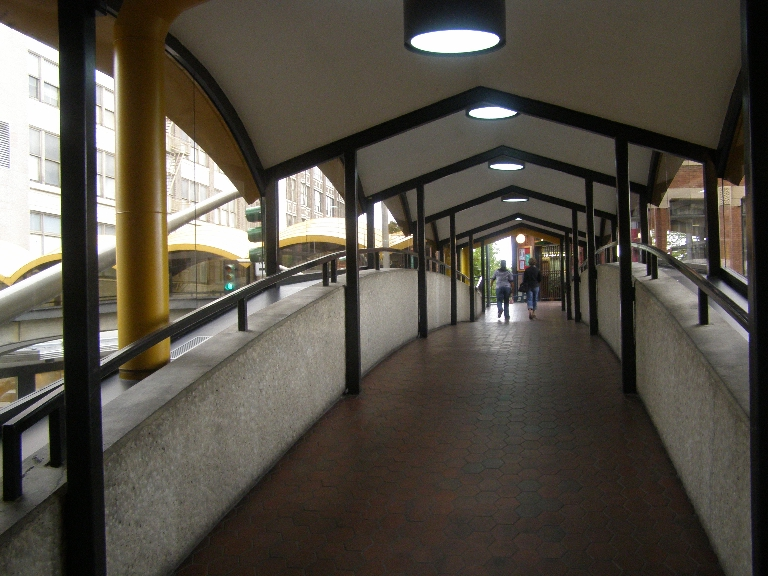
The exterior and interior of the skywalk linking the Parkade Plaza to the Bennett Block

The Downtown Core is the heart of Spokane and is generally considered to be the several block vicinity surrounding Spokane City Hall, River Park Square, the STA Plaza, and the Davenport Hotel. A majority of Spokane's high-rise buildings are located in this core area. Spokane's skywalk system also overlays the street grid and street life within the core, linking 14 blocks together, making it among the largest skywalk systems in the United States. It is used for quick pedestrian travel across streets and traffic in cold and inclement weather and retail space as well. Skywalk connections to parking garages such as The Parkade most notably make parking and traveling to downtown buildings several blocks away faster.

==== Davenport District ====
Located south and west of the Downtown Core, the Davenport District hosts many concerts, plays, galleries, and other shows. This area is home to hotels, live entertainment venues, and art galleries. These events are hosted in a variety of venues including the Fox Theater, The Bing Crosby Theater, and the Knitting Factory.

This arts and entertainment district has a number of large historic buildings. Many of these buildings have been renovated, and capture Spokane's "Age of Elegance" at the turn of the 20th century. More recently, this area has become a hub for breweries. There are multiple tasting rooms between Lincoln and Cedar Street along First and Second Avenue, making it a popular destination for brewery tours.

==== Convention Center District ====
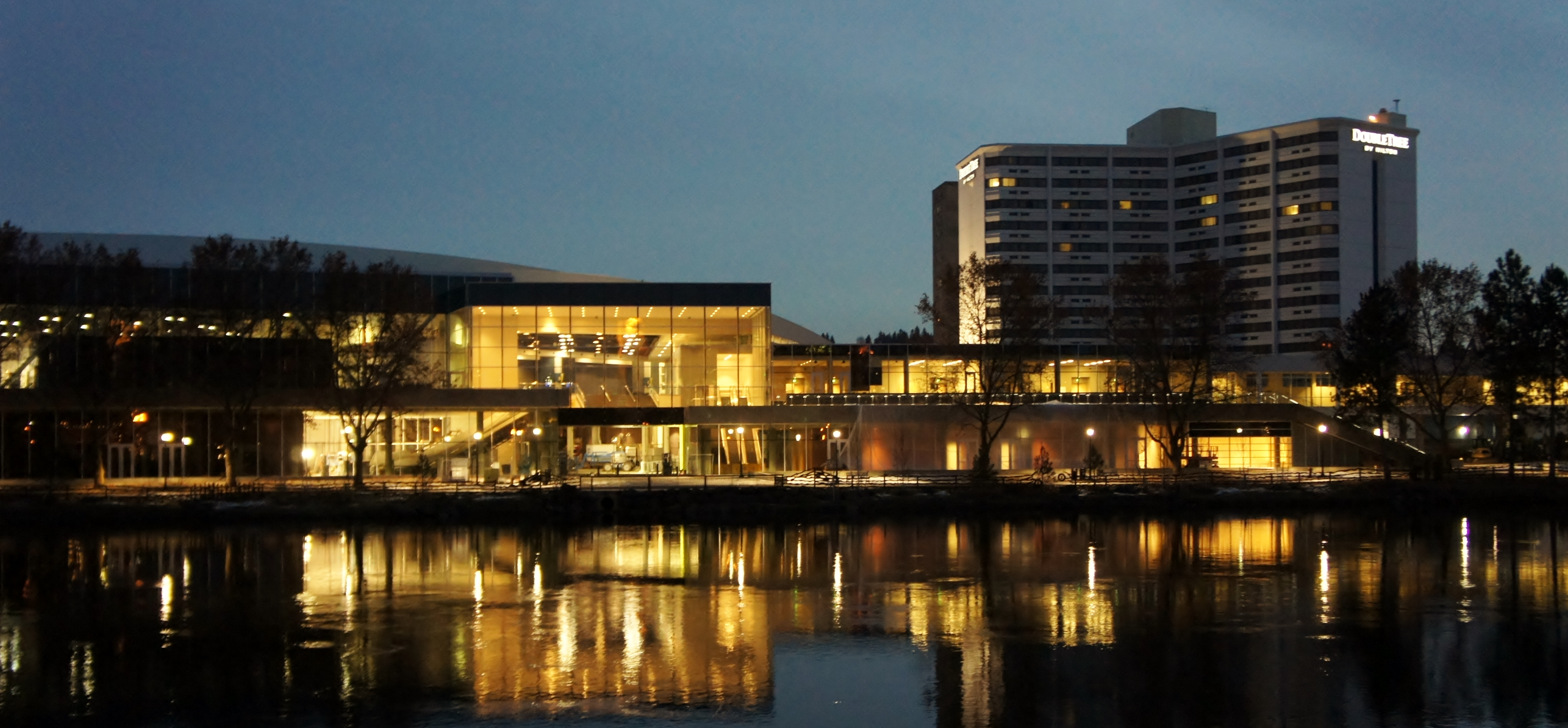
Spokane Convention Center and DoubleTree Hotel

The Convention Center District is situated to the east of the Downtown Core and is anchored by the Spokane Convention Center and First Interstate Center for the Arts. Its location is directly adjacent to Riverfront Park; an advantage that has been embraced through careful planning and architectural design of buildings in the district which allows the buildings to interface with the park, the river, and recreational trails (including the Centennial Trail) that run along it. The district was born out of Expo '74, which developed the original structure that ultimately became the First Interstate Center for the Arts and the Spokane Convention Center. The convention center has been expanded several times since its original construction, stretching the bounds of the district farther east, where it ties into the University District.

Much of the other development around the Convention Center District stems from the Spokane Convention Center and the First Interstate Center for the Arts, including restaurants, retail, and hotels. Spokane's largest and tallest hotels, including the DoubleTree, Davenport Grand, and Red Lion Hotel at the Park are located in or immediately adjacent to the convention center district. The business types located around the Convention Center District provide a common overlap with businesses supporting the adjacent University District as well, helping to alleviate some of the "urban dead zones" that are all too commonly created when the convention centers - particularly large ones in major cities much larger than Spokane - are not in use.

==== North Bank ====
The North Bank area of downtown south of Boone Ave.

The North Bank area is located to the north of the Spokane River and Riverfront Park. It is home to a variety of uses including civic, residential, shopping, dining, and lodging. Destinations include the Spokane Arena, The Podium, ONE Spokane Stadium, Spokane Civic Theatre, and the Flour Mill. A number of businesses based on the North Bank are in the health, banking, hotel, and real estate industries.

=== Historic districts ===
Downtown Spokane is home to three historic districts listed on the National Register of Historic Places.

- East Downtown Historic District
- Riverside Avenue Historic District
- West Downtown Historic Transportation Corridor

=== Kendall Yards ===
Located along the southern edge of the West Central neighborhood just across the Spokane River from Downtown Spokane is Kendall Yards, a new urbanist community. Though not officially within the boundaries of Downtown or Riverside, Kendall Yards plays a vital role in the culture and future of the downtown core by increasing the urban residential population in the immediate vicinity of it.

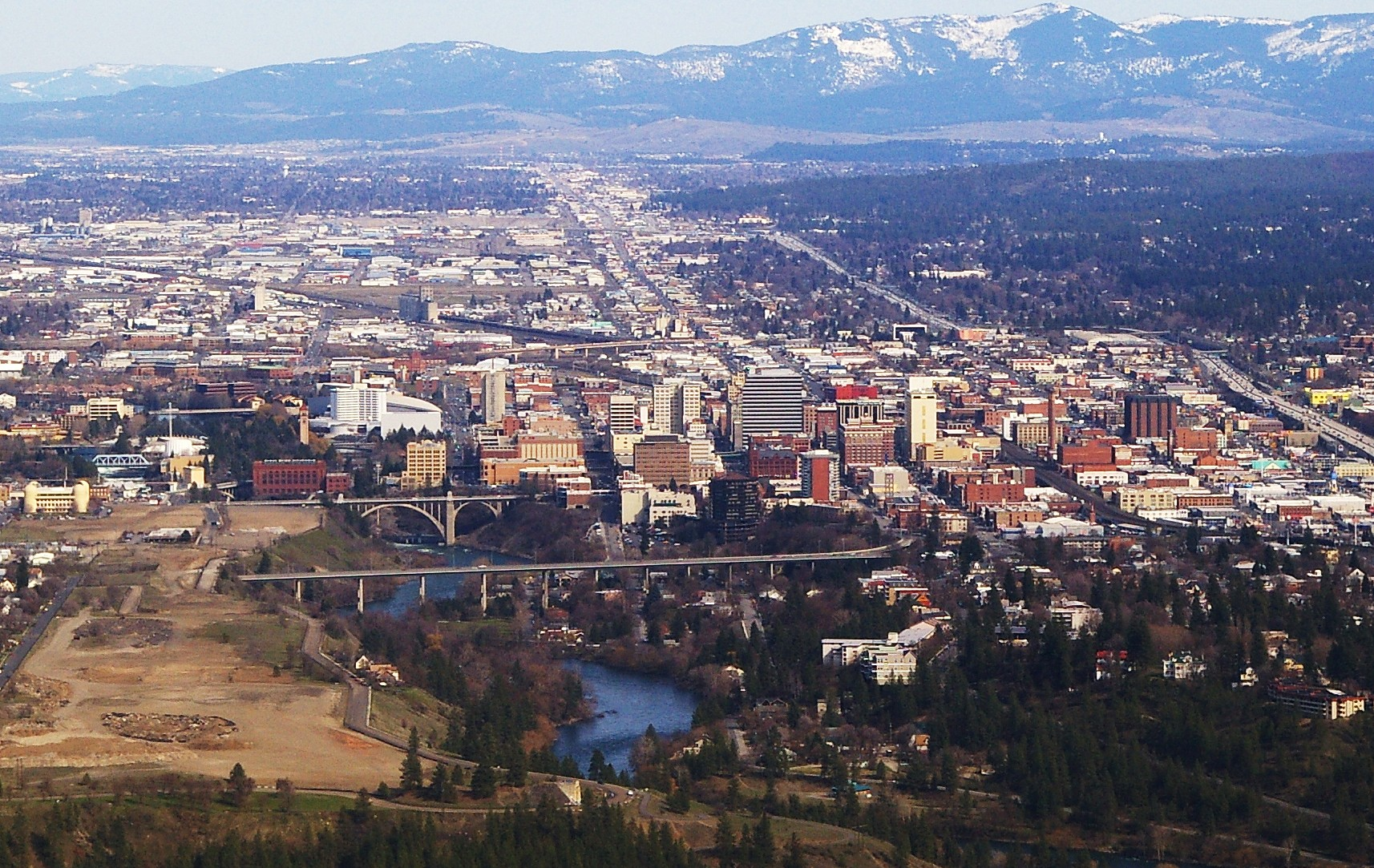
Kendall Yards (lower-left corner) is an infill development on the north bank of the Spokane River

The neighborhood is one of the largest urban infill development projects in the city's history and has reclaimed a brownfield formerly occupied by rail yards. The site of Kendall Yards used to be the main entry point of the railroad into Downtown Spokane before alterations to the downtown area in preparations for Expo '74 relocated the railroads south of the Spokane River. The 78-acre (0.32 km^{2}) site sat vacant from that point on for another three decades until 2005, when a brownfield cleanup took place in preparations for the groundbreaking of the development. The cleanup, which won a US EPA award, took approximately one year and removed over 223,000 tons of contaminated soil from the site.

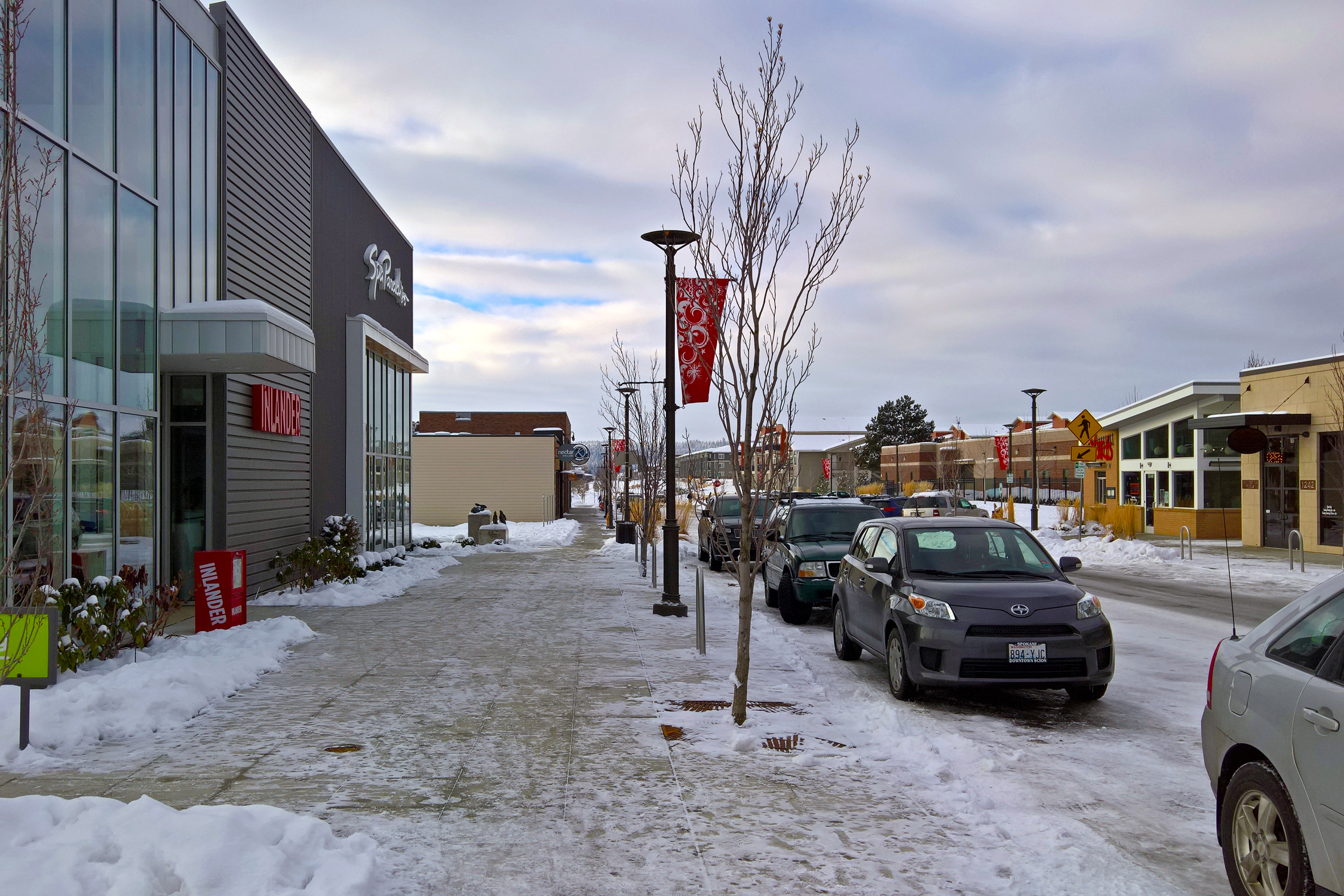
Summit Pkwy in the urban village of Kendall Yards. The wide sidewalks, landscaped streets, and mix of building types, are all consistent with new urbanist principles.

The initial proposal for Kendall Yards called for 2,600 residences and 1 million square feet of commercial space, worth up to $1 billion. The development broke ground in 2007, however, the impending Great Recession bankrupted the project's developer before any buildings were constructed. The now cleaned-up site continued to sit vacant for another few years until a Spokane-based developer, Greenstone Corp., purchased the site in 2009 and began construction in 2010. In response to the economic conditions at the time, the original plans for the development were scaled back; the proposed density, residential unit count, and commercial square footage were all reduced to approximately one-half of the original scope. However, the scaled-back plans did have its advantages; the development was more likely to be successful, the more land would be available for open green space, and the reduced density would be more compatible with the existing fabric of the adjacent West Central neighborhood to the north. Construction of the development is phased and is expected to be ongoing through the mid-2020s.

Designed on new urbanist principles, the plan and makeup of the neighborhood emphasizes mixed-use development, diversity of densities and housing types, open space, and walkability. Much of the neighborhood consists of multi-family structures of townhomes, condominiums, and apartments. There are also single-family detached homes, community gardens, free-standing commercial buildings, and mixed-use buildings (with ground-floor retail and apartment units above). Green and recreational space is also emphasized; the community includes parks, sidewalks, and plazas and also completed a long-awaited infill section of the Centennial Trail, extending it from Downtown through the entire 78-acre (0.32 km^{2}) site along the northern banks of the Spokane River Gorge.

== History ==
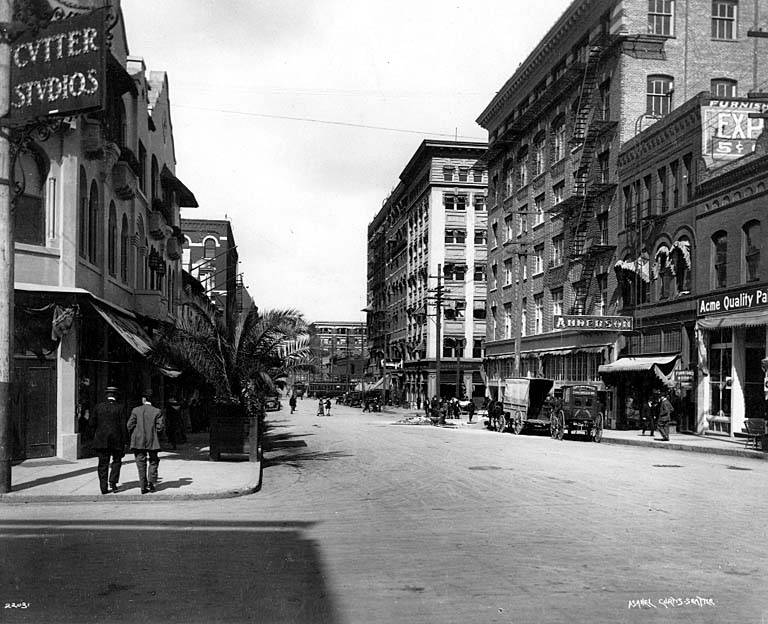
Post St. from 1st Ave. toward Sprague Ave., 1911. The Davenport restaurant is on the left.

The Spokane Falls and its surroundings were a gathering place and focus for settlement for the area's Indigenous people for thousands of years, due to the fertile hunting grounds and abundance of salmon in the Spokane River. The first American settlers in what is now Spokane were J.J. Downing and S.R. Scranton, cattle ranchers who squatted and established a claim at Spokane Falls in 1871. Together they built a small sawmill on a claim near the south bank of the falls. James N. Glover and Jasper Matheney, Oregonians passing through the region in 1873, recognized the value of the Spokane River and its falls for the purpose of water power.

The Payless at Main and Post in 1949

On August 4, 1889, a fire, now known as The Great Fire began just after 6:00 p.m. and destroyed the city's downtown commercial district. Due to technical problems with a pump station, there was no water pressure in the city when the fire started. In a desperate bid to starve the fire, firefighters began razing buildings with dynamite. Eventually the winds and the fire died down; 32 blocks of Spokane's downtown core had been destroyed and one person killed. After the devastation of the fire, Spokane experienced a building boom. The downtown was swiftly rebuilt with local investment from the regions mineral resources using brick, stone masonry, and terra cotta. Within a year, 100 buildings had been built on the blank canvas that is now the downtown core, much of it from esteemed architects such as Herman Preusse, Kirtland Cutter, and John K. Dow, and Spokane was able to host the 1890 Northwest Industrial Exposition. The building of downtown reached its modern boundaries in 1905.

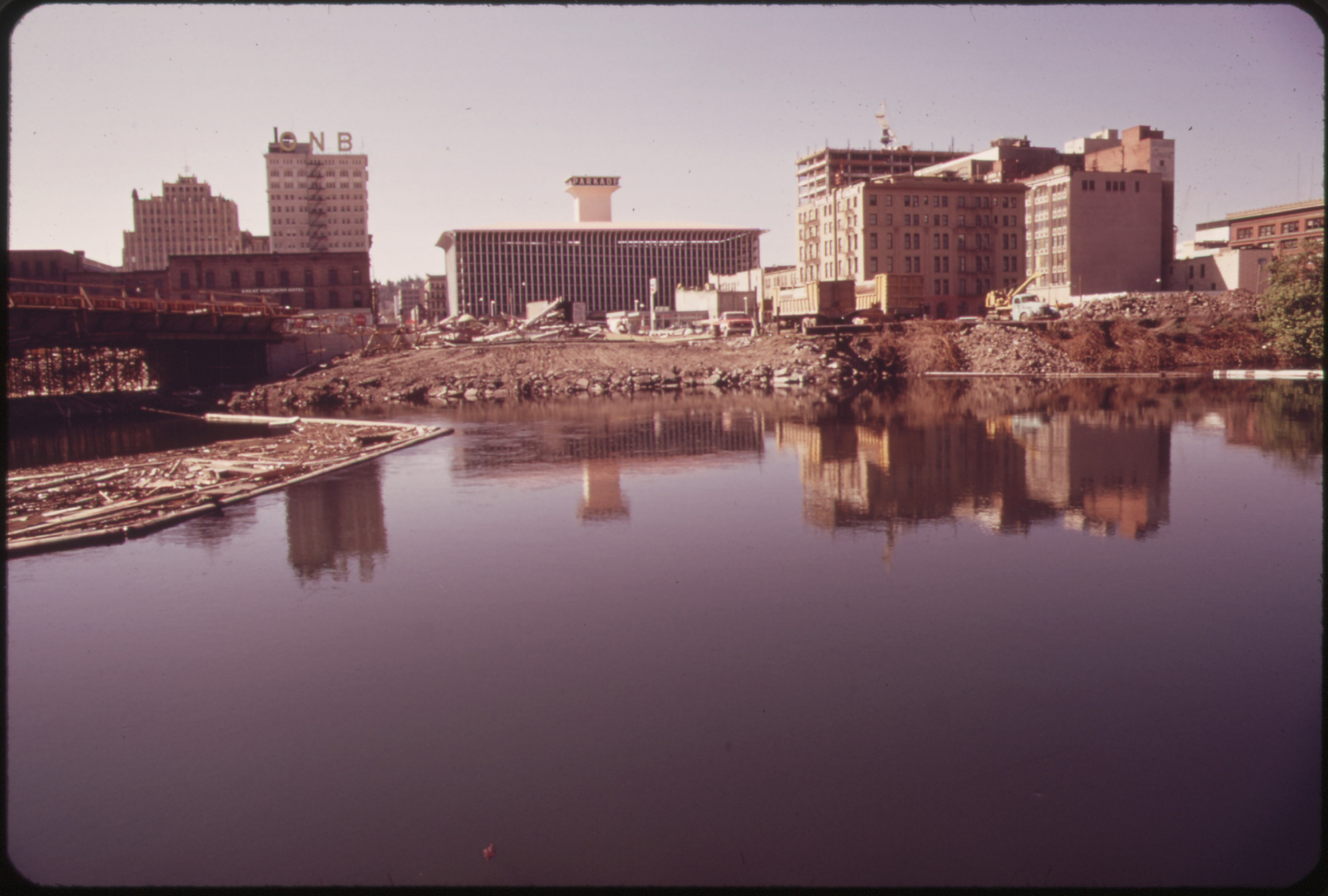
Site preparation for Expo '74, which transformed the neighborhood

The transition from rail travel to the personal automobile was complete in 1936 when Spokane's streetcar service was ended and had a negative impact on the vitality of the downtown core as a destination. The 1950s especially, with the car making travel to and from places more convenient, growth and shopping became decentralized to the outskirts of town, such as NorthTown Mall in 1954, where there was ample parking space, as opposed to downtown where parking was difficult and more scarce even after demolishing buildings to create more space. Following decades of stagnation and slow growth, Spokane businessmen formed Spokane Unlimited in the early 1960s, an organization that sought to revitalize downtown Spokane. Early but modest success came in the form of a new parking garage in 1965, The Parkade. A recreation park showcasing the Spokane Falls was the preferred option, and after successful negotiation to relocate the railroad facilities on Havermale Island, they executed on a proposal to host the first environmentally themed World's Fair in Expo '74 on May 4, becoming the smallest city at the time to host a World's Fair. This event transformed Spokane's downtown, removing a century of railroad infrastructure and re-inventing the urban core. After Expo '74, the fairgrounds became the 100-acre (40 ha) Riverfront Park. The Expo transformed the blighted Chinatown, which was demolished, into a convention center after the fair.

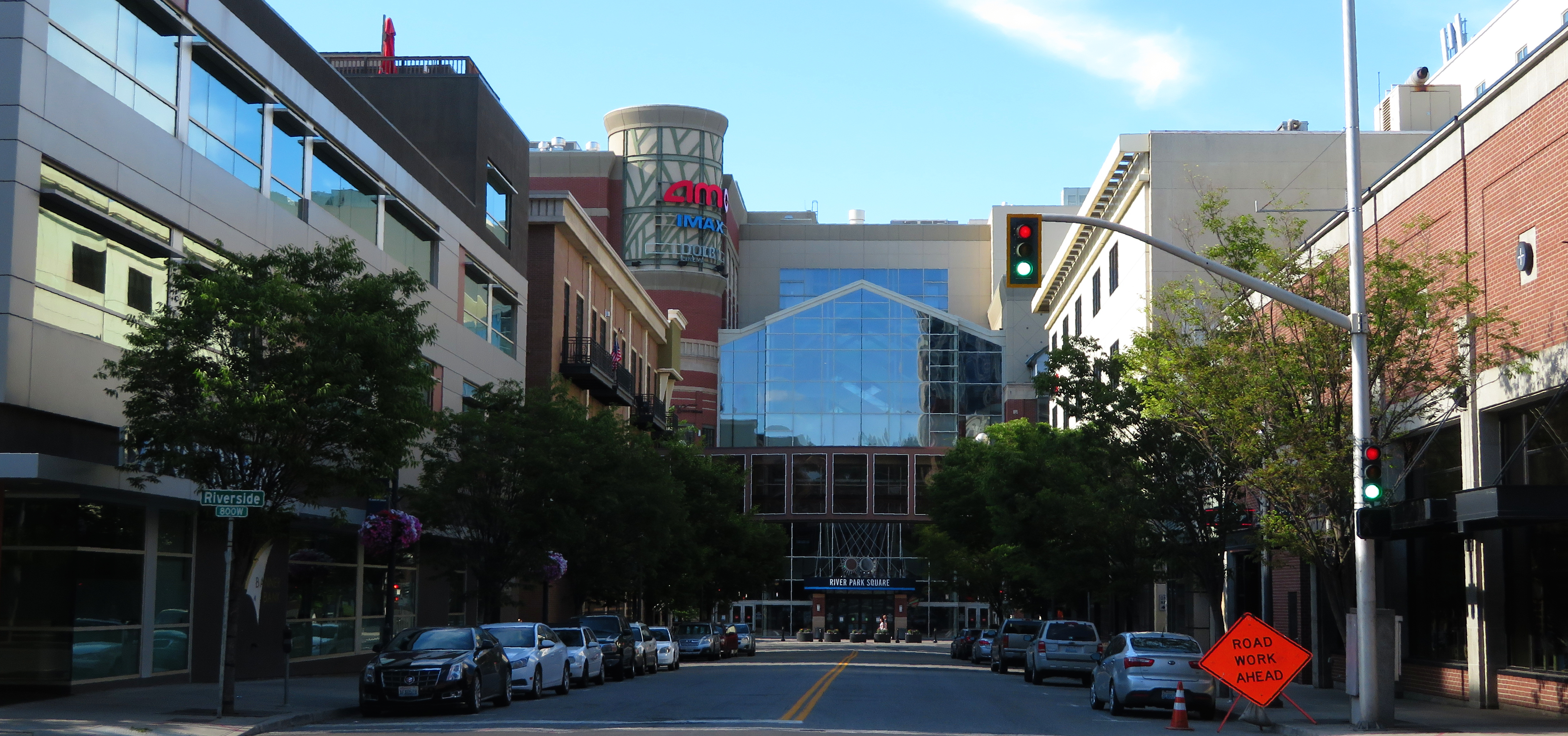
The River Park Square re-development is credited by some with sparking a downtown revitalization

Following more decades of lackluster growth and the continuing effects of post World War II suburbanization, downtown Spokane had undergone another major rebirth in the decade before the Great Recession, after the redevelopment of the River Park Square Mall in 1999. The $110 million dollar investment in the mall and an its controversial attached parking garage created from a public-private partnership aimed to keep its last anchor tenant, Nordstrom, and some credit the project for sparking a flurry of other projects in the mid-2000s. The historic Davenport Hotel underwent a major renovation in 2002 after being vacant for over 20 years. The project was funded by local entrepreneur Walt Worthy, who also added a Safari-themed 20 story tower to the hotel in 2007. Other major projects included the renovation of the Holley-Mason Building, the building of the Big Easy concert house (renamed the Knitting Factory), the remodeling of the historic Montvale Hotel and Fox Theater (now home to the Spokane Symphony) and the expansion of the Spokane Convention Center. The interest and investment in the downtown area has continued into the 2020s and has also spilled over into the downtrodden portion of downtown south of the railroad tracks.

== Demographics ==
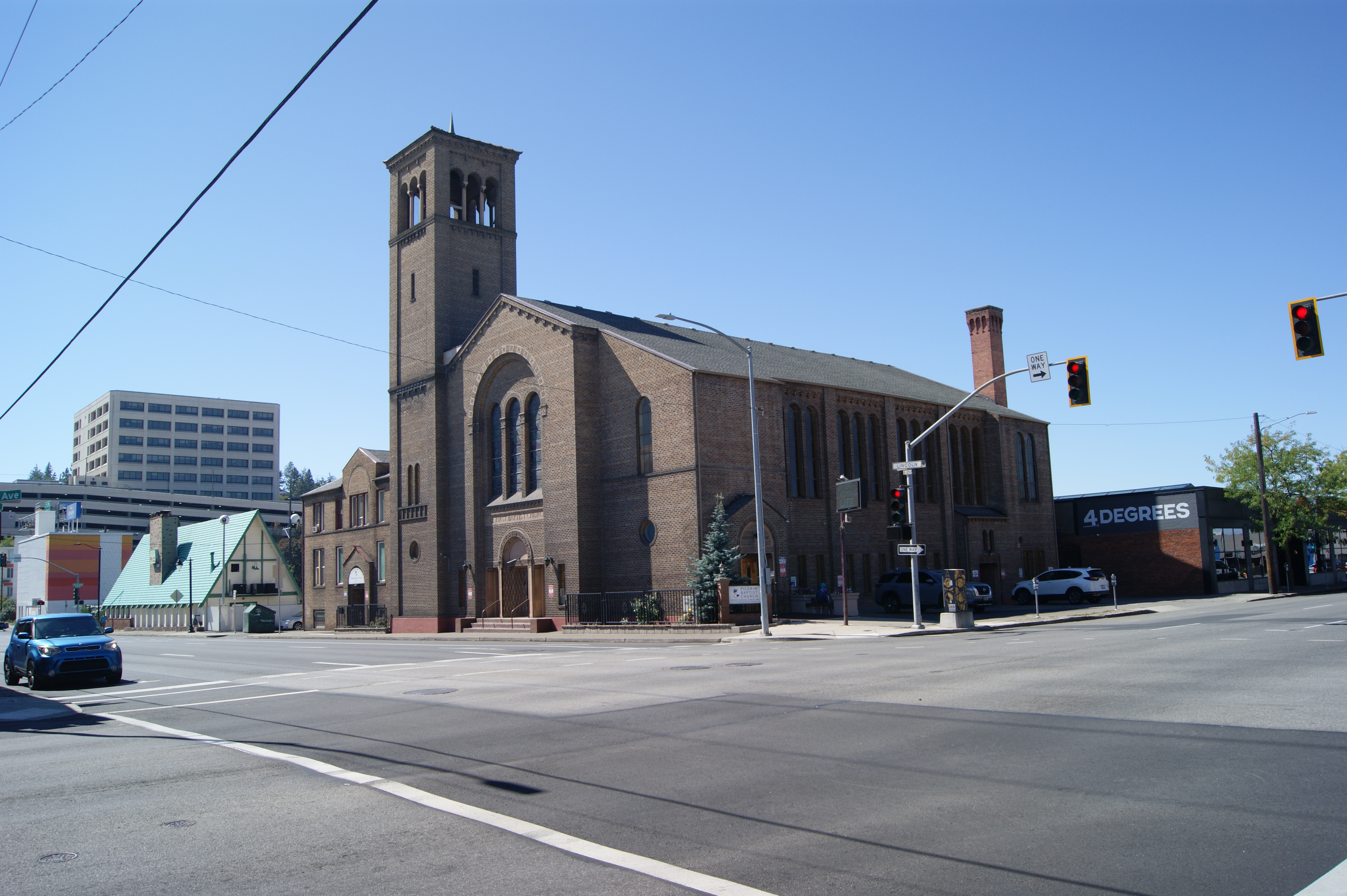
Pilgrim Slavic Baptist Church

As of 2017, the population of Riverside was 3,071 in 1,938 households, 96% of which are rented, compared with 45.3% for the city. 5.7% of Riverside residents are 19 years or under, compared to 21.9% citywide. 19% are age 65 or above, compared to 14.5% citywide. 14.1% of people in Riverside identify as people of color, compared to 15.1% citywide. The median household income in Riverside is $13,433 compared to $44,768 for the whole city.

92.3% of residents were born in the United States. Of foreign born residents, 25.7% came from Mexico, 14.9% from the Philippines, 10.3% from the U.K., and 8.6% from Chile.

== Education ==
Riverside is served by Spokane Public Schools but has no schools physically located within the neighborhood. Roosevelt Elementary in the Cliff/Cannon neighborhood serves the student population south of the Spokane River while Garfield Elementary in Emerson/Garfield serves neighborhood children living north of the river. The middle and high school boundaries are demarcated along the same boundary with children south of the Spokane River and attending Roosevelt Elementary graduating to Sacajawea Middle School in the Comstock neighborhood and then feeding into Lewis and Clark High School, which is located on 4th Avenue, just beyond the neighborhood limits in Cliff/Cannon. The students north of the Spokane River and attending Garfield Elementary go on to attend Yasuhara Middle School located to the northeast in the Logan neighborhood and return to Emerson/Garfield to attend North Central High School.

The main branch of the Spokane Public Library is located adjacent to River Park Square on Spokane Falls Boulevard. Opened in 1994, the library houses the Inland Northwest Special Collections room. In 2022, a $33 million renovation was completed to make it more useful as a creative center as well as an information center.

== Architecture ==
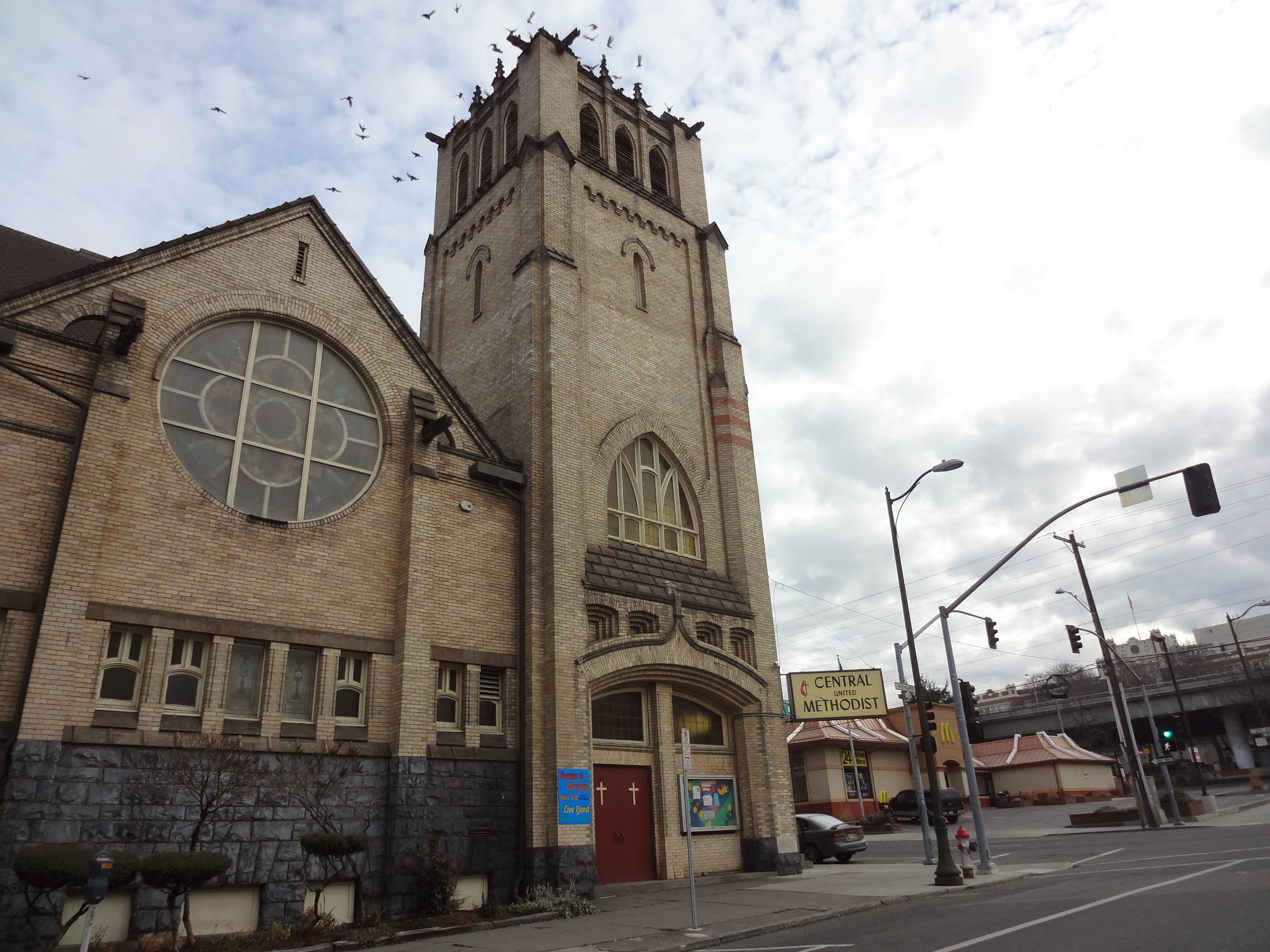
New Community Church

Downtown Spokane contains a wide range of architectural styles that reflects the tastes of the times in the built environment from the 1890s to today. Most of Spokane's notable buildings and landmarks in the Riverside neighborhood and the downtown commercial district were rebuilt after the Great Fire of 1889 in the Romanesque Revival style. Examples include the Great Northern clock tower, Review Building, Cathedral of Our Lady of Lourdes, First Congregational Church, Washington Water Power Post Street substation, Peyton Building, and The Carlyle. The principal architect of many of the most well known downtown buildings was Kirtland Kelsey Cutter. Downtown structures designed by Cutter include the Spokane Club, Washington Water Power Substation, Monroe Street Bridge (featured in the city seal), Central Steam Plant, and the Davenport Hotel.

In contemporary times, one of the city's foremost and influential architects has been Warren C. Heylman, who helped give the city a great breadth of mid-century architecture. In downtown, Heylman designed The Parkade, Spokane Regional Health Building, Riverfalls Tower, Cathedral Plaza, and the Burlington Northern Latah Creek Bridge.

Other well-represented architectural styles downtown include Art Deco (Spokane City Hall, Paulsen Center, Fox Theater, City Ramp Garage), Renaissance Revival (Steam Plant Square, Thomas S. Foley Courthouse, Legion Building, San Marco), Neoclassical (Masonic Center, Hutton Building, Bing Crosby Theater), Chicago School (U.S. Bank Building, Liberty Building, Old City Hall) and Modernist (The Parkade, Ridpath Hotel, Bank of America Financial Center).

=== Buildings ===
Fifty percent of Spokane's downtown is designated as historic and the downtown area contains three National Register Historic Districts. The tallest building in the city is the Bank of America Financial Center at 288 feet (88 m), completed 45 years ago in 1981. The nearby Wells Fargo Center is the second tallest at 243 feet (74 m), and opened a year later. Other significant public facilities in downtown include the Spokane Convention Center, the First Interstate Center for the Arts, and the Spokane Arena.

== Law and government ==
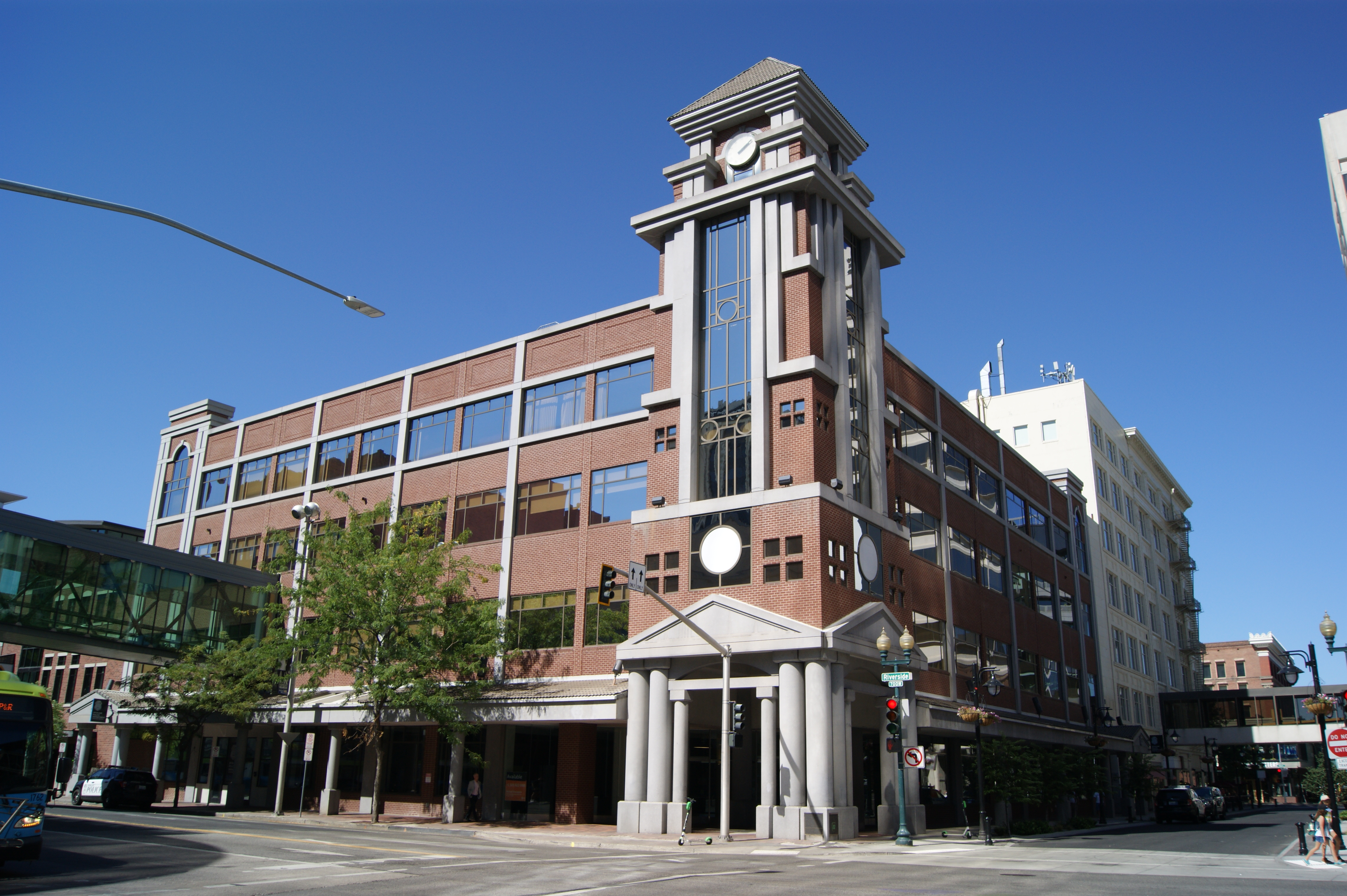
Spokane Police Department's downtown precinct

The city center is the site of several governmental facilities. At the city level, the city government offices, Spokane City Hall, is located just west of Riverfront Park at 808 W. Spokane Falls Blvd. while the Spokane County Courthouse is located north of the Spokane River at 1116 W. Broadway Ave. near other county government offices which are located nearby. The Spokane Regional Health District offices are housed in the architecturally distinctive Spokane Regional Health Building on W. College Ave. In the US federal court system, the Thomas S. Foley U.S. Courthouse of the Eastern District of Washington is located at 920 W. Riverside Ave which next door to the Federal Building.

The Spokane Police Department (SPD) and Spokane County Sheriff's Office (SCSO) headquarters are both located within the Public Safety Building near the Spokane County Courthouse on Mallon Ave. The SPD also has a downtown precinct across the street from the STA Plaza on Riverside Ave.

== Media ==
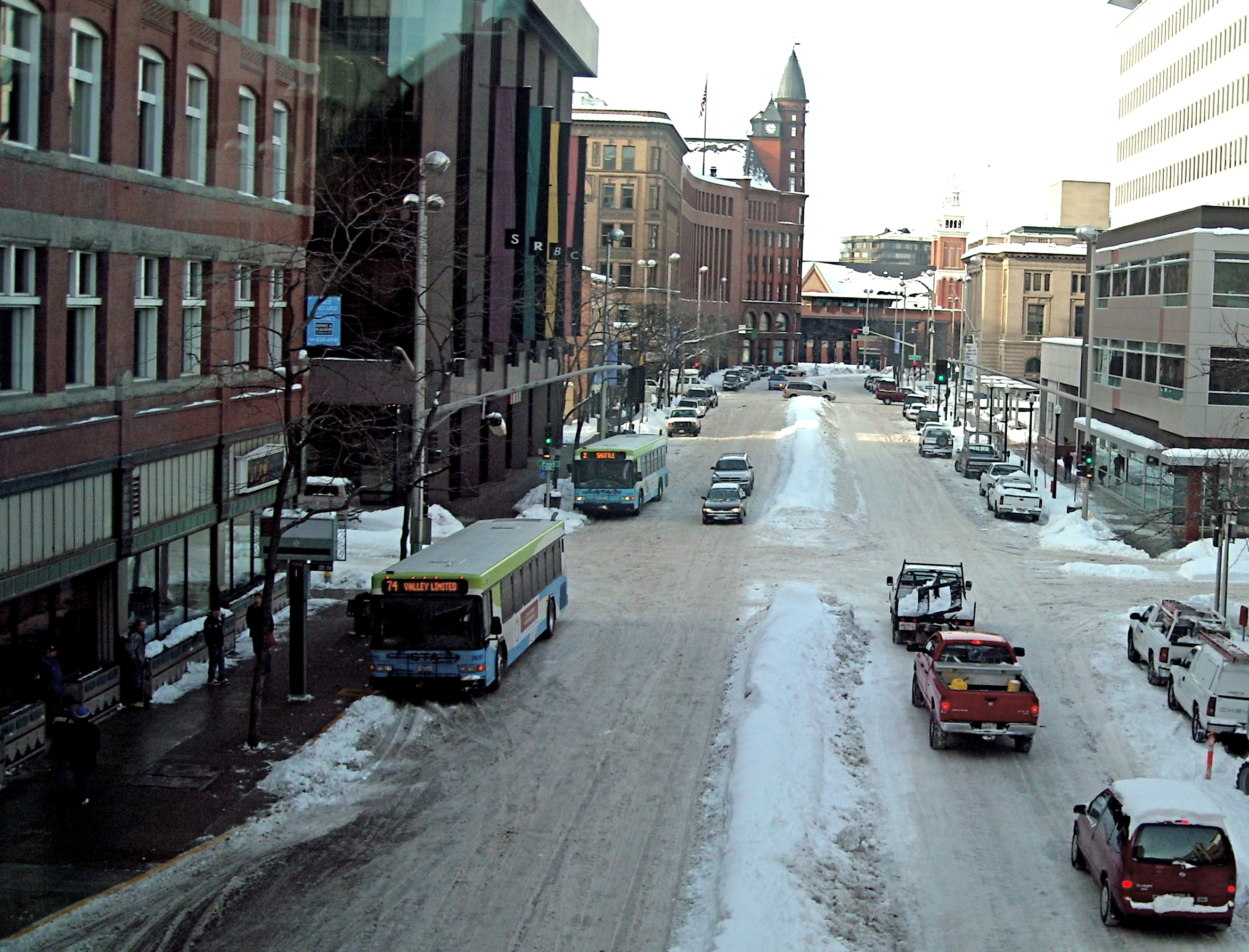
The Review Building, the offices of Spokane's major daily newspaper

The downtown and its periphery is the location for several local media outlets. For print media, Spokane's only major daily, The Spokesman-Review has its offices in the Review Building at 999 W. Riverside Ave. For broadcast media, KHQ-TV, the city NBC-network affiliate station has its studios in the downtown core as well. Both The Spokesman-Review and KHQ are properties of the Cowles Company. Spokane's ABC affiliate, KXLY-TV has its studios north of the Spokane River on Boone Ave.

== Transportation ==
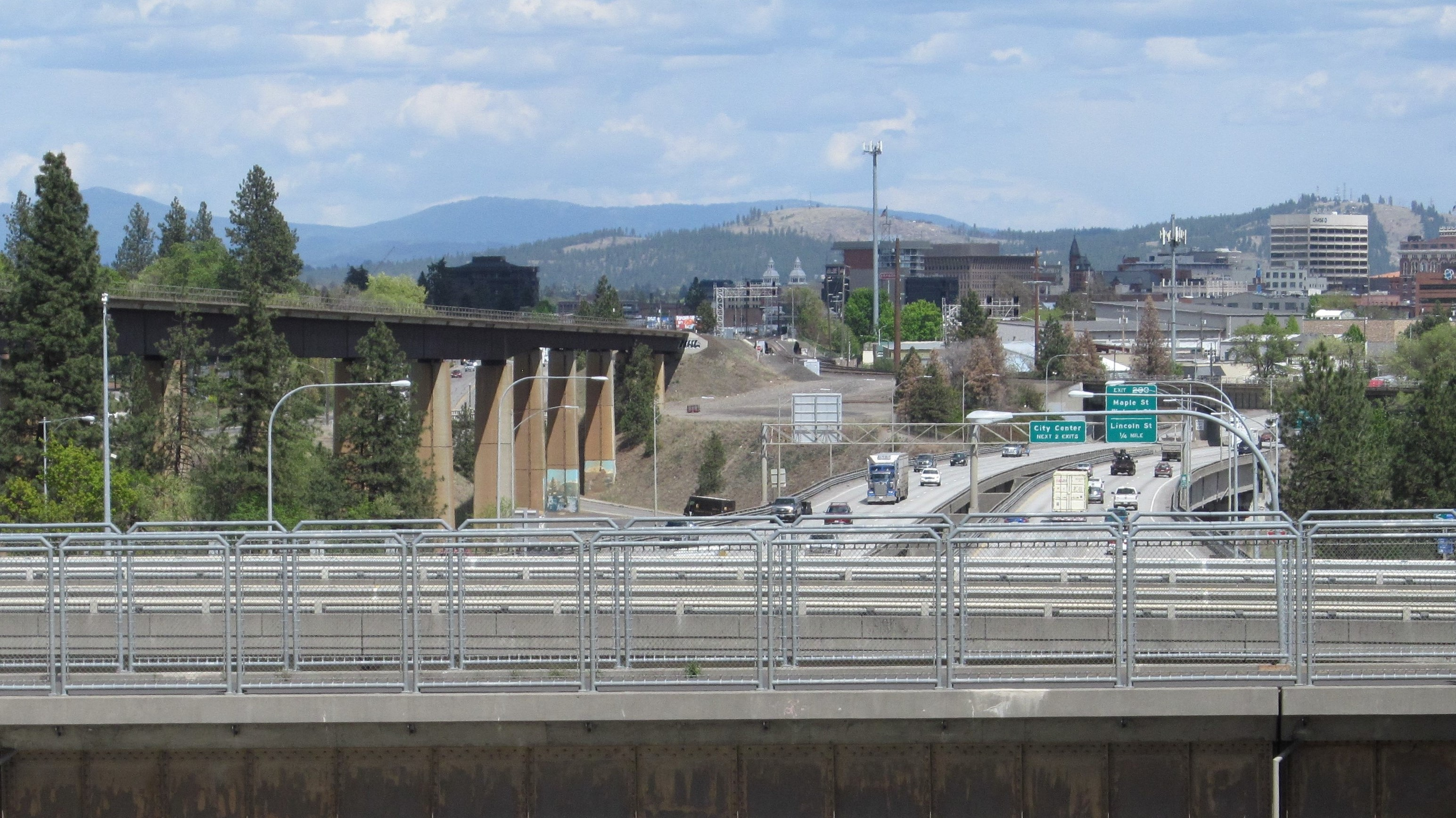
The Burlington Northern Latah Creek Bridge and Interstate 90 running through Spokane city center

Mass transportation throughout the Spokane area is provided by the Spokane Transit Authority (STA), which operates a fleet of 156 buses. Its service area covers roughly 248 square miles (640 km^{2}) and reaches 85 percent of the county's population. A large percentage of STA bus routes originate from the central hub, the STA Plaza in downtown Spokane. The region's first bus rapid transit line, City Line, also runs through downtown. Spokane has rail and bus service provided by Amtrak and Greyhound via the Spokane Intermodal Center. The city is a stop for Amtrak's Empire Builder on its way to and from Chicago's Union Station en route to Seattle and Portland. The Riverside neighborhood of downtown Spokane has a Walk Score of 90 out of 100, rating as a "Walkers Paradise" meaning daily errands do not require a car and a Transit Score of 68 which indicates it also has "Good Transit" where there are many public transportation options.

Downtown Spokane's city streets use a grid plan that is oriented to the four cardinal directions where the east–west roads generally are designated as avenues and the north–south roads are referred to as streets; the roads in downtown were made to be 100 feet (30 m) rather than the 60 feet (18 m) typical in the rest of the Spokane to make it possible for a horse and buggy to turn around in the street. Division Street divides the city into East and West, while Sprague Avenue splits the city into North and South, these two streets intersect in downtown. Interstate 90 (I-90) runs east–west from Seattle, through downtown Spokane, and eastward through Spokane Valley, Liberty Lake, and onward to Coeur d'Alene and then Missoula.

=== Bridges ===
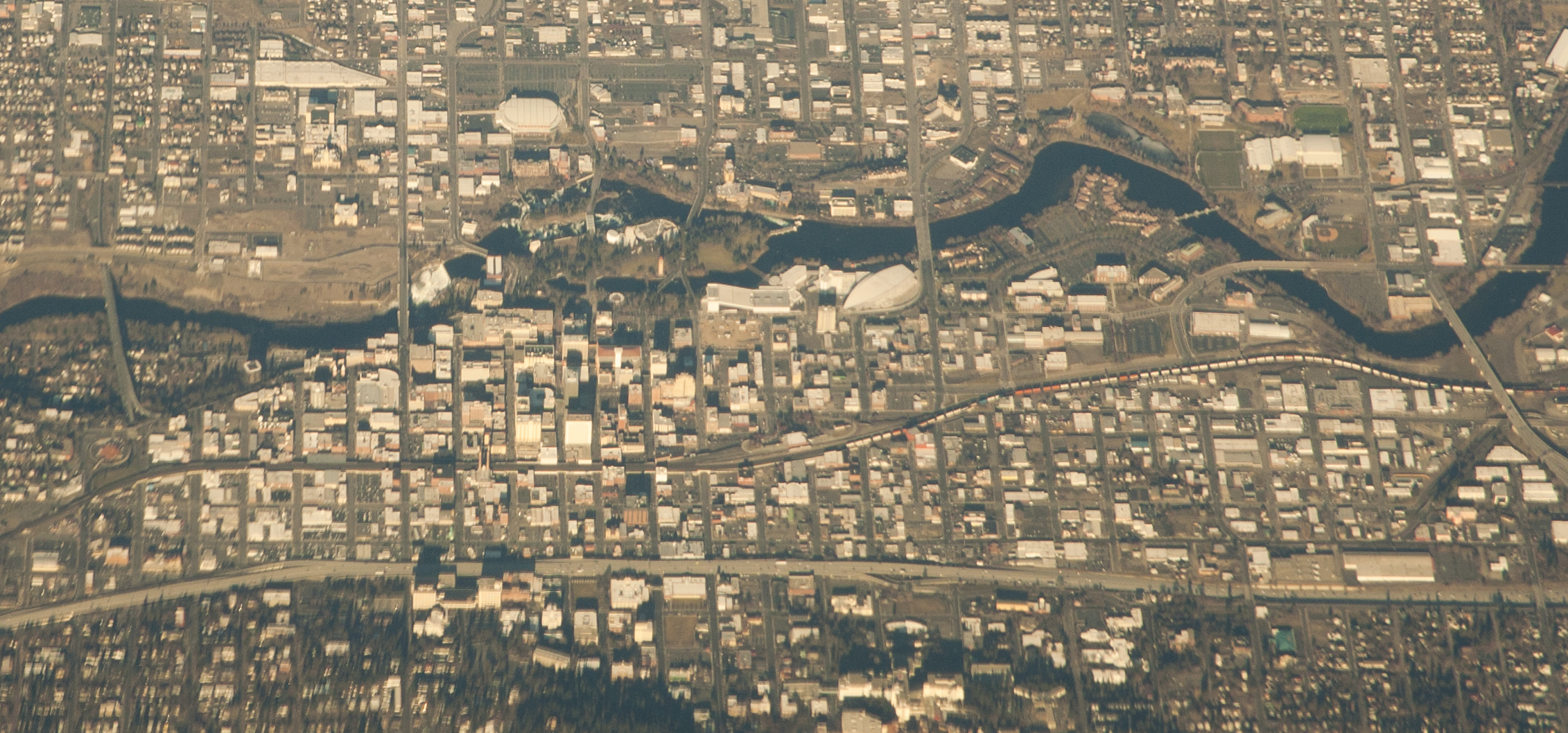
Bridges over the river, 2013

There are five automobile Spokane River crossings and one named pedestrian bridge in the Riverside neighborhood:

- Division Street Bridge
- Washington Street Bridge/Stevens Street Bridge
- Howard Street Middle Channel Bridge (pedestrian bridge)
- Post Street Bridge
- Monroe Street Bridge
- Maple Street Bridge

== Cityscape ==
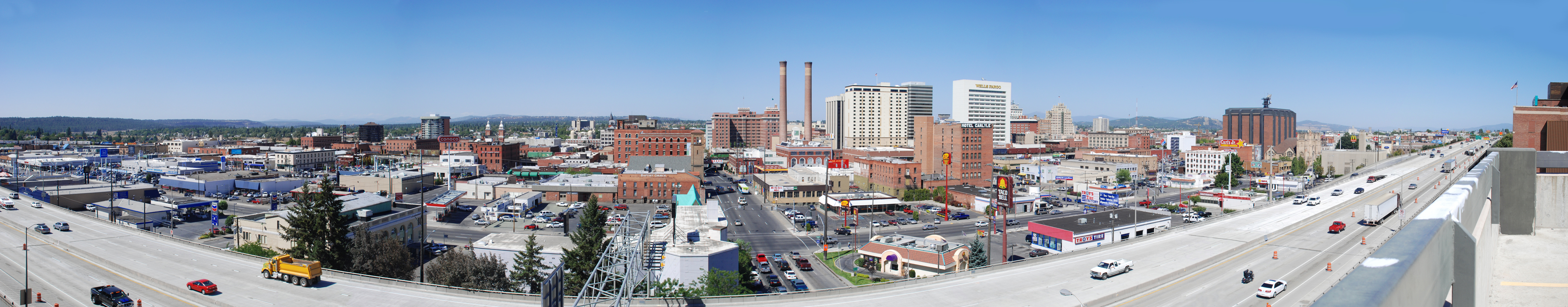
Panorama of Downtown Spokane in 2007, looking north from the Deaconess Medical Center parking garage with elevated Interstate 90 in foreground.
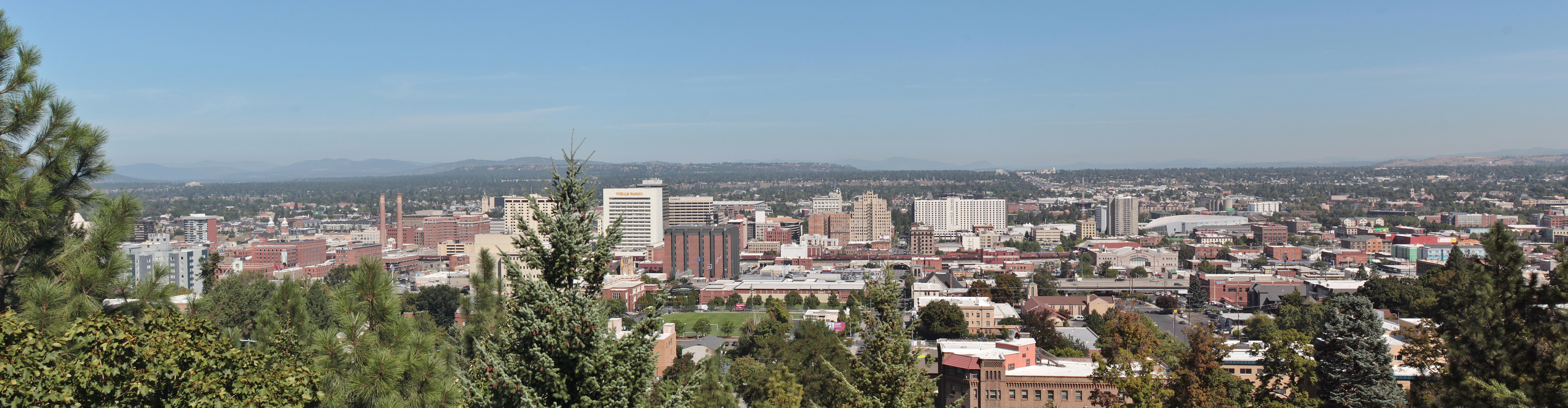
Panorama of Downtown Spokane in 2019 from Edwidge Woldson Park.
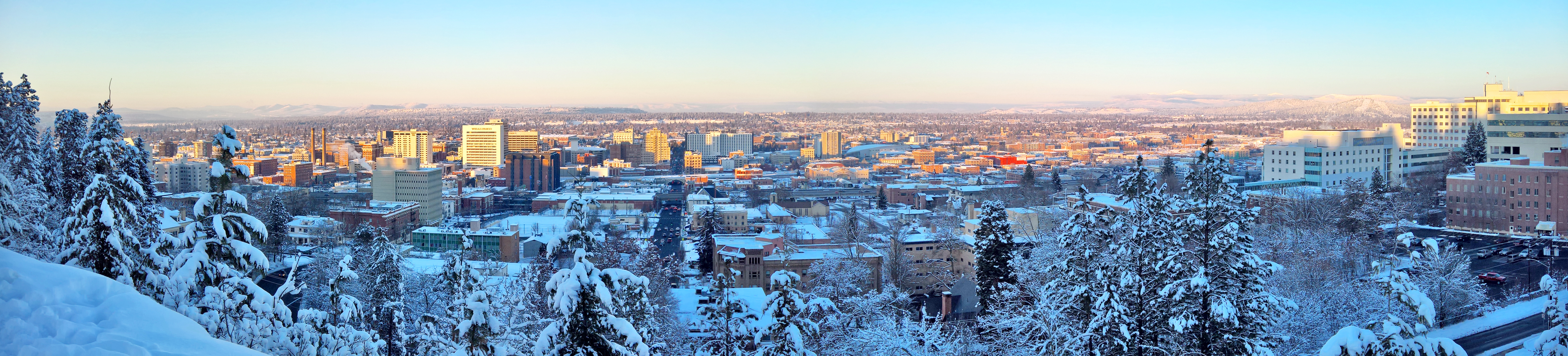
Panorama of Downtown Spokane in 2015 looking north from Cliff Drive.
