= Parkade Plaza =

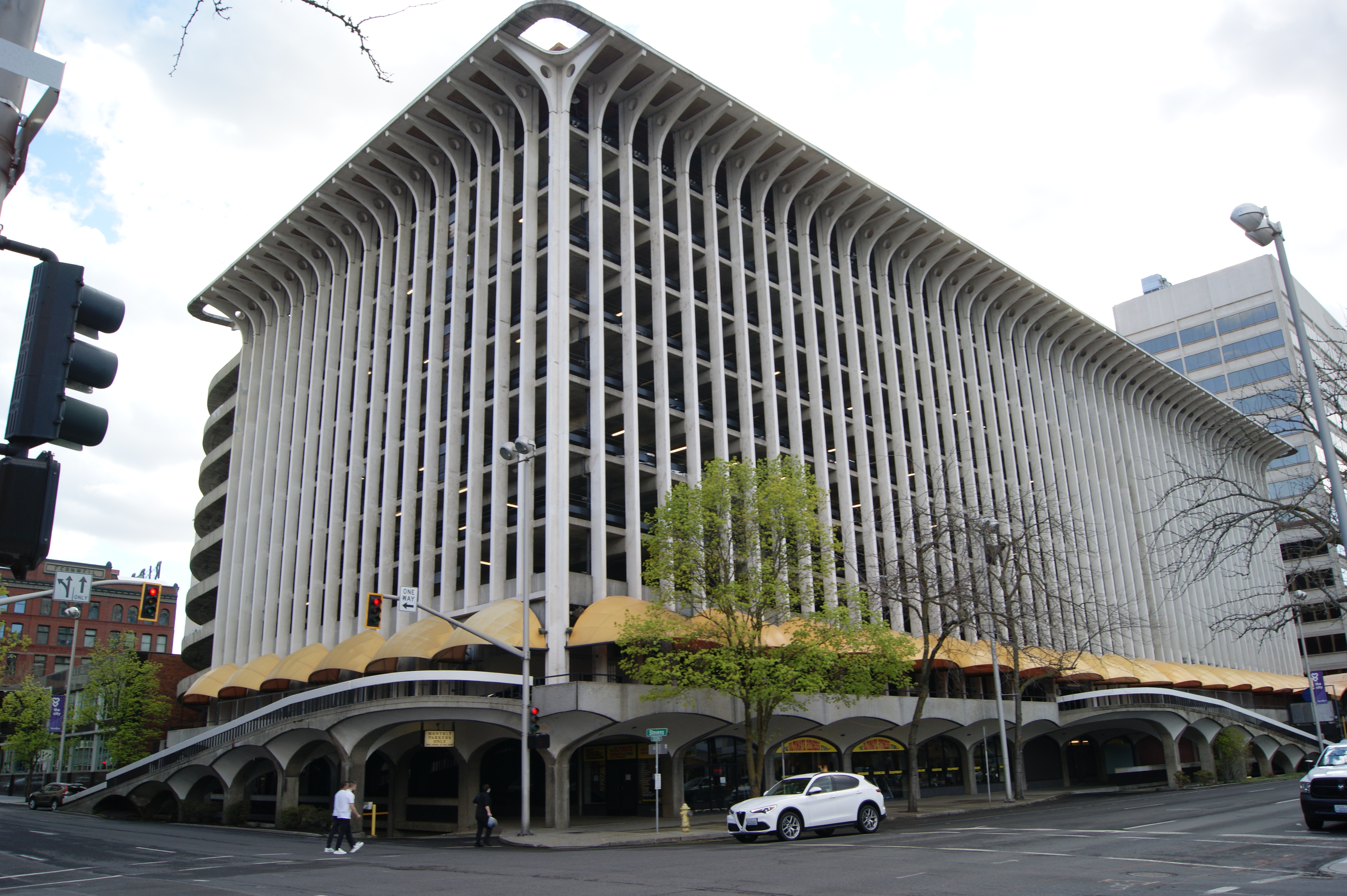
- Interactive map of the Parkade Plaza area

General information
- Status: Completed
- Type: Parking garage
- Location: 511 W. Main Ave., Spokane, United States
- Coordinates: 47°39′32″N 117°25′13″W
- Completed: 1967
- Cost: $3,500,000 (1967)
- Client: City of Spokane

Height
- Height: 188 ft (57 m)

Technical details
- Floor count: 11

Design and construction
- Architect: Warren C. Heylman

The Parkade Plaza, also known locally as The Parkade, is an 11-level public parking garage in Spokane, Washington, United States. It was built for $3.5 million in 1967 by Sceva Construction Company, with concrete furnished by the Acme Concrete Company. The structure was built to accommodate one thousand automobiles and achieved its record capacity on December 22, 1969, with 3878 cars, well beyond the 1967 capacity needs. The architect for the project was Warren C. Heylman, who was also responsible for other notable works in and around Spokane including the Spokane Regional Health Building, the Riverfalls Tower Apartments, the original terminal of the Spokane International Airport, and the public library in Colfax, Washington. The Parkade is notable for its connection to the Spokane skywalks and won an award for 'excellence in use of concrete' in 1968 that was presented directly to Warren C. Heylman. The building was listed on the National Register of Historic Places in 2025.

== History ==
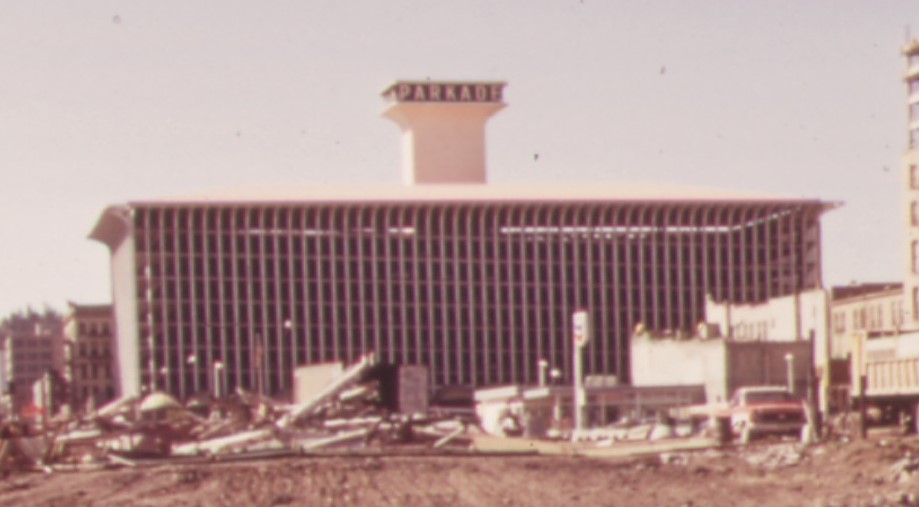
The Parkade Plaza during preparation for the 1974 World's Fair

The site, situated on Main Street, between Howard and Stevens, was originally occupied by six old and deteriorating buildings. The site was once occupied by a theater, first called the Pantages Theater then The Orpheum until 1958, when it was torn down to make way for parking.

The Parkade was built as a private renewal project to promote business in Downtown Spokane. It shifted downtown traffic patterns with the goal of enlarging the tax base of the city core. “A first step for Spokane and other cities in revitalizing their central business district is to provide parking, this center, we feel, goes a long way towards filling that need here”, commented John G. F. Hieber. Spokane Unlimited Inc., a nonprofit organization of the city's business leaders concerned with revitalizing the downtown area, advocated such a parking structure as one of the first major moves in halting congestion resulting from the auto. “Creeping blight has been engulfing many business districts,” said Philip H. Stanton, president of Spokane Unlimited. “This is a way to halt it – make potential income from surrounding properties so high owners can't afford to leave it unimproved at present rental rates.”

The new Parkade project encompassed not only a large parking structure but eight businesses that would occupy the second-level skywalk level, including R. Alan Brown Interior Design Studio, a Hickory Farms retail store, Early Dawn Ice Cream shop, Northwest Radio & TV store, and an art gallery hosted by the R. Alan Interior Design Studio in the rotunda under the helical down ramp of the parking center. The Parkade concept was praised by John G. F. Hieber, Parkade president for “focusing a lot of attention on our city center... It has brought us tenants who until now had been expanding into outlying shopping centers.”

Philip W. Alexander, managing director of the adjacent Bon Marche and vice president of the Parkade claimed that the Parkade isn't just a parking garage but a symbol of new life in the heart of Spokane. “We wanted and got a dramatic structure. It is aesthetic and functional and is already spurring plans for upgrading other properties around it.”

In 2020, an investment firm bought the Parkade Plaza and started renovations that included replacing structural supports, new lighting, repainting the exterior, and modernizing the mechanical equipment in the building with energy efficient units. The garage reopened in October 2023.

== Design ==
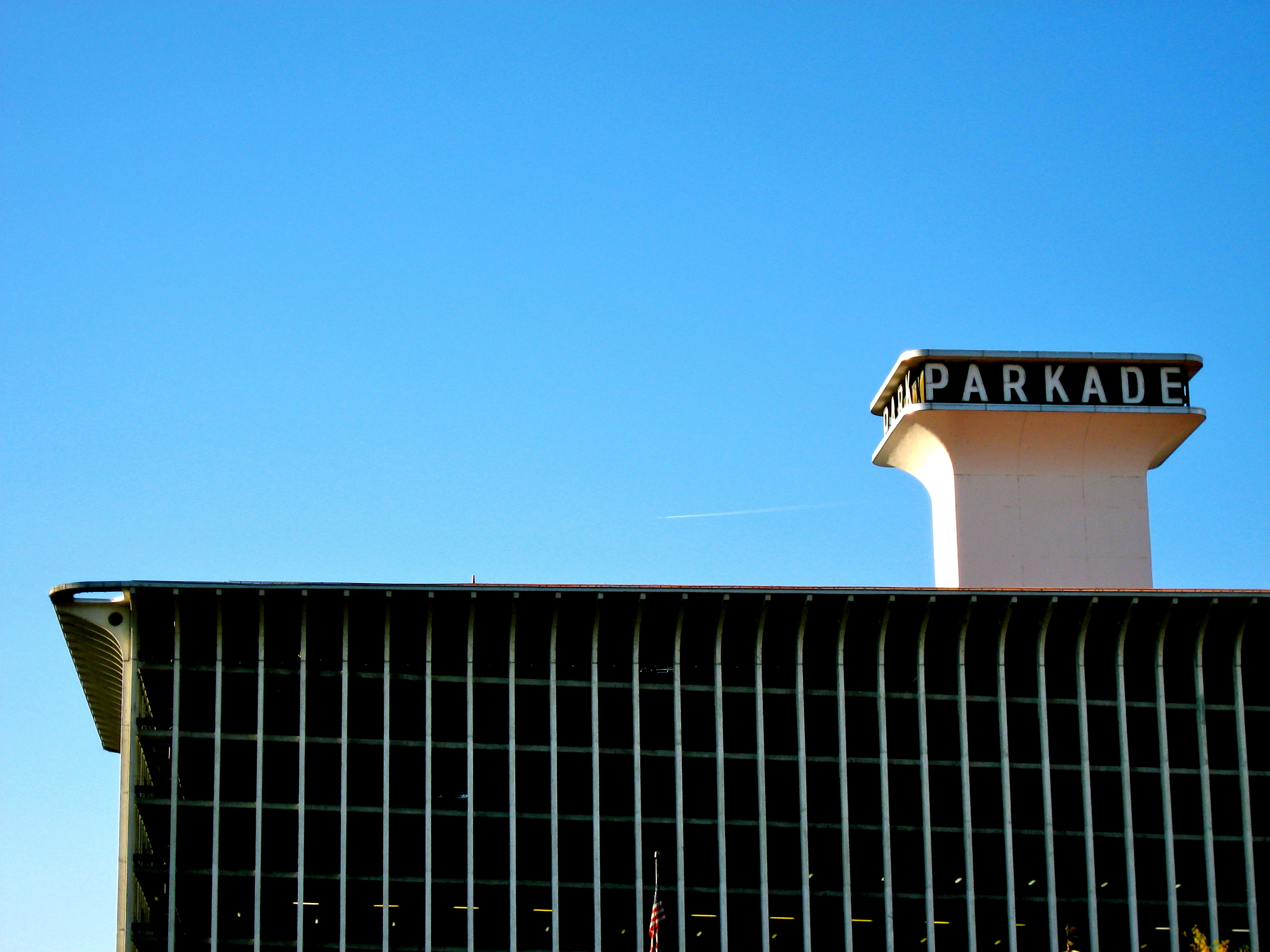
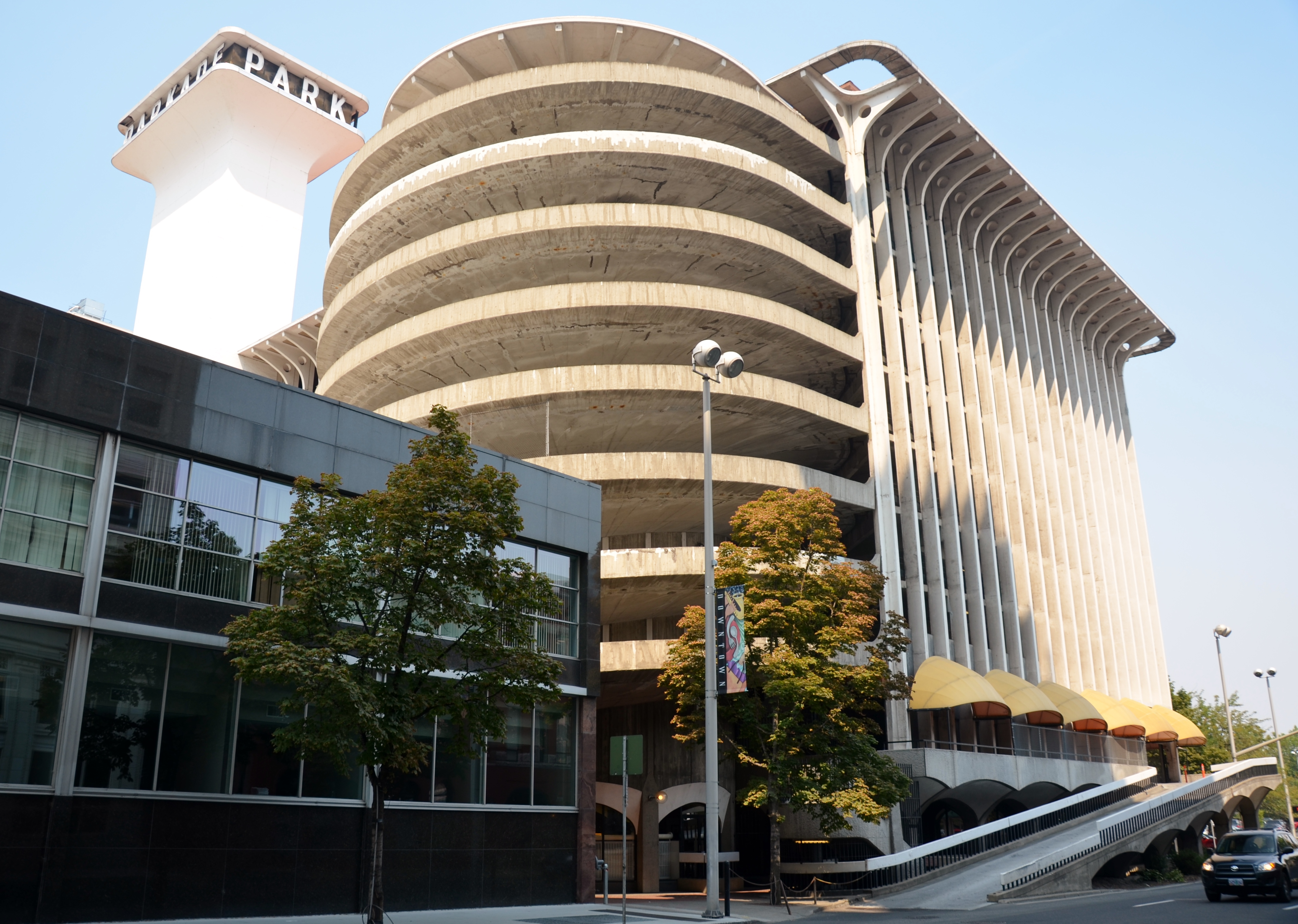
The Parkade Plaza

The Parkade incorporated many new and innovative design features for a parking structure. The skywalks that circle the structure were the first of its kind found on a parking center and was one of the few 'modern' parking facilities with a roof, a realistic and sensible solution given the climate of the region. The design separated pedestrian and automobile entrances and exits, a consideration not found on similar parking garages of the time period. Floors in the garage are sloped to allow for maximum parking spaces, the architect commented, “All the floors are sloping in this thing – parking structures aren't easy to design.” Light, long columns in the exterior design were used to create a vertical effect. Light arches, a 'working arch', creates a wide overhang at the top, protecting the white outer walls and shielding the structure from bad weather. A striking feature of the center is its sculptured tower extending 175 feet above the ground and far above the main structure. Its major function is housing the mechanisms for the passenger elevators as well as serving as a beacon to motorists signaling a safe place to park their vehicles. And people were the center of the design claimed the architect Heylman, “There will be a news stand and outdoor restaurant with brightly colored umbrellas, a city ticket booth, and other pleasant facilities. The environment is designed for people – not things.”
