= Spokane Flour Mill =

- U.S. National Register of Historic Places
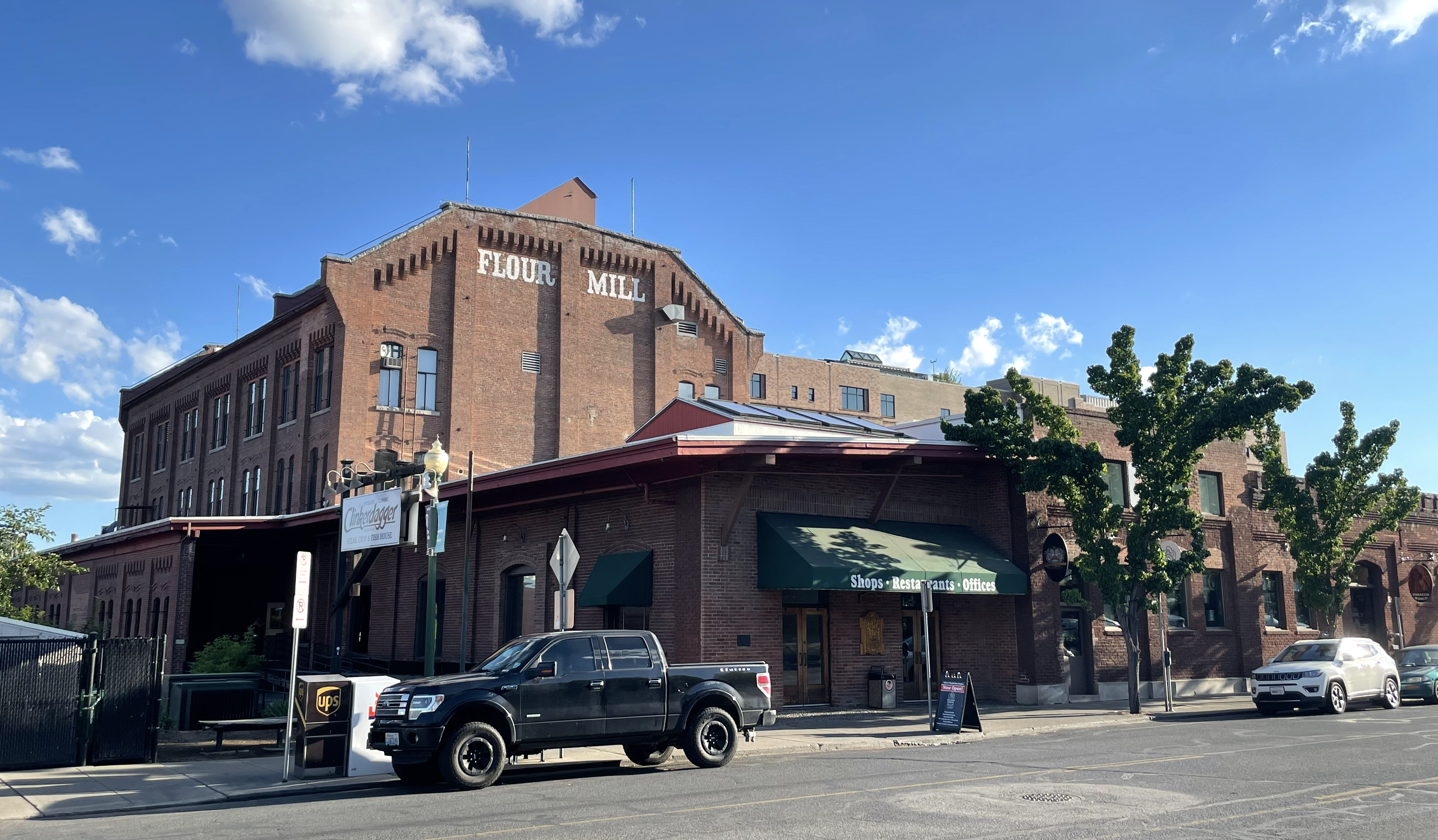
- Flour Mill from Mallon St.

- Location within Spokane riverfront area
- Location: 621 W. Mallon, Spokane, Washington
- Coordinates: 47°39′55″N 117°25′19″W
- Area: less than one acre
- Built: 1895
- Architect: E.P. Allis Co.
- NRHP reference No.: 78002778
- Added to NRHP: February 8, 1978

The Spokane Flour Mill, commonly known as the Flour Mill among locals, is a historic building in Downtown, Spokane, Washington located adjacent to the Spokane Falls on the river's north bank. The building was constructed in 1895 and designed by the Edward P. Allis company. The Flour Mill served as a flour mill from 1900 until 1972; it was converted into offices and a retail mall in advance of Spokane hosting the 1974 World's Fair, and has continued to serve those purposes since. As of 2022, the Flour Mill is home to offices, restaurants and shops.

== History ==
The Spokane Flour Mill was constructed in 1895. The nascent city of Spokane, then known as Spokane Falls, was mostly built on the southern bank of the Spokane River as it cascaded over the Spokane Falls. In 1889 the Great Spokane Fire burned most of what had been built in the new city, most of which was built on the south side of the river. The Spokane Flour Mill was set to be built on the north side, instead. Milling, both timber and grain, was an integral part of the city's early economy, and the Flour Mill was one of numerous mills built in the immediate vicinity of the falls.

After the Panic of 1893 crashed the local economy, the city purchased shares in the Spokane Falls Water Power Company for $27,000. That same year, the company was sold to the Northwestern Milling and Power Company. The second company was then mortgaged to a Dutch firm, Amsterdamsch Trustees Kantoor, for $300,000 in order to build a new grain and sawmill at the falls. The contract for the construction was awarded to Milwaukee's Edward P. Allis and the W. C. Care Milling company. They estimated a cost of $90,000 for construction of the Flour Mill. The foundation for the building was laid in September 1895 and construction was nearly complete by December of that year.

Though the building was complete by the end of 1895, it did not become operational until 1900 due to a series of lawsuits concerning ownership of the mill. The city sued Northwestern Milling, and Amsterdamsch Trustees Kantoor foreclosed on its mortgage. The lawsuits made their way all the way to the Washington Supreme Court. Amsterdamsch Trustees Kantoor ultimately won control of the mill. In July 1900, Amsterdamsch Trustees Kantoor sold the Flour Mill, along with 27 acres of property along the falls, to Washington Water Power. The mill was incorporated in 1901 as Inland Empire Milling, and three years later it was disincorporated and reincorporated as Spokane Flour Mill.

The Flour Mill was operational until 1972, when depreciation combined with increasingly obsolete equipment within the mill ultimately forced its closure. At the time of closure, the Flour Mill was one of just two operational grain mills remaining in the city. In the years leading up to the closure of the Flour Mill, much of the city center was undergoing urban decay. All other mills surrounding the falls were ultimately demolished, but the Flour Mill was spared from abandonment or demolition due to a combination of fortuitous circumstances: its location, and the timing of its closure. Spokane was set to host the 1974 World's Fair just two years after the mill's closure. The setting for the fair would be the islands in the Spokane Falls and the south bank of the river adjacent to the falls. The Flour Mill was located directly to the west of the north entrance to the fair. In 1973 and 1974 the building was renovated and converted into a shopping center. It was one of the first examples of historic preservation and adaptive reuse of a building in Spokane.

On October 4, 1977, the Flour Mill was nominated to the National Register of Historic Places. On February 8 of the following year, the building was entered into the national register. In July 1986, it was named to the local Spokane Register of Historic Places. In entering the property into the local register, the building's owners and the city came to an agreement that gave the local historic preservation commission power to approve or disapprove plans for alterations, additions or demolitions on the property.

During the early 2000s, during an economic downturn, many tenants left the Flour Mill. The buildings owners made upgrades to the interior, elevator, security and landscaping that resulted in the newly-vacant storefronts finding new occupants.

== Description ==
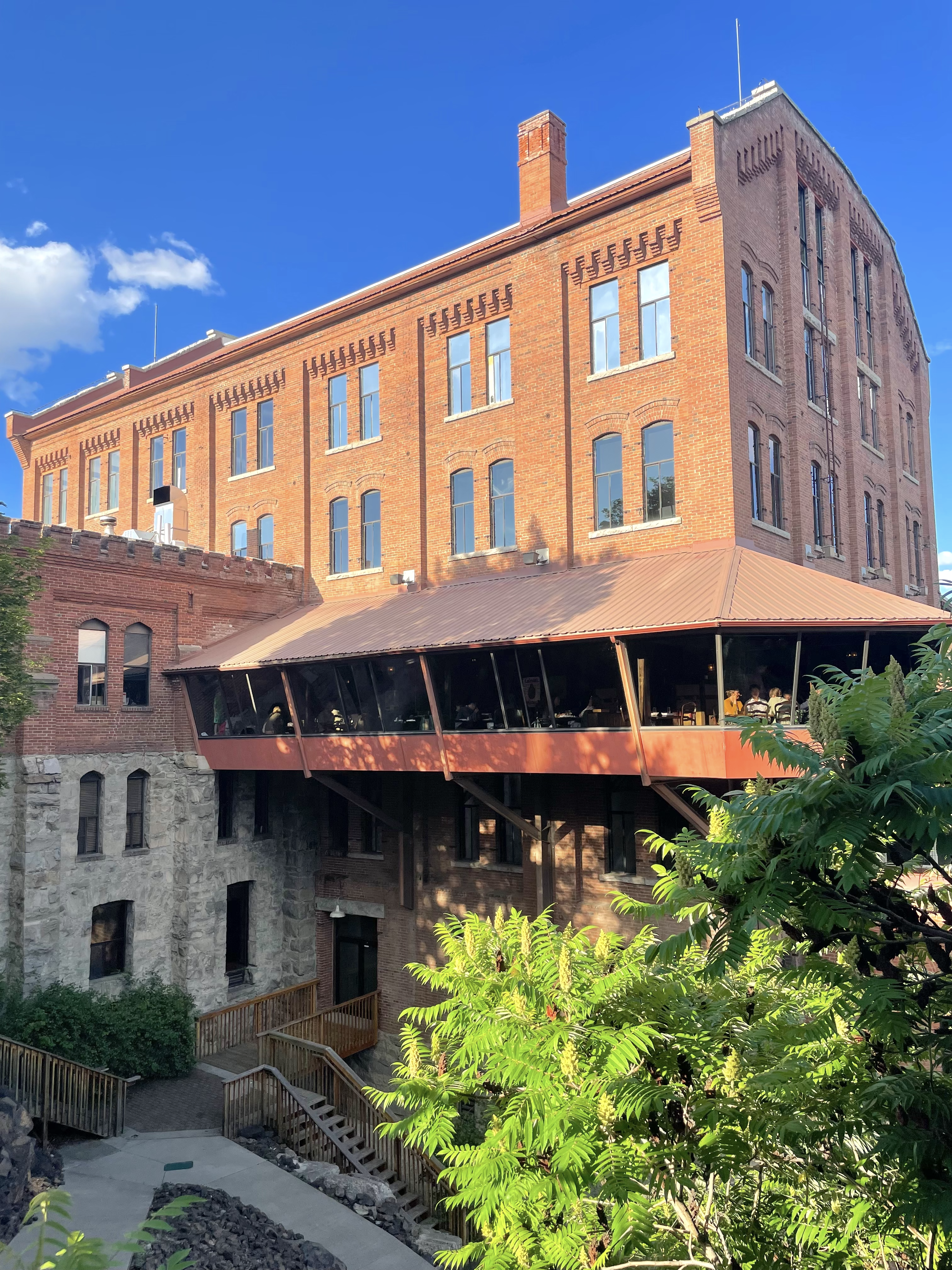
Rear view of the Flour Mill

The Flour Mill is a four-story building from the street front, with a seven-story elevation in the rear that drops down to the level of the river. It is a red brick building built atop a granite foundation with dimensions of 60 by 130 feet. The height of the street-facing portion of the building is 45 feet, though the rear of the building rises to 86 feet. Along the east of the building is a covered bay for rail cars that allowed for loading of grain even in inclement weather. The main structure of the building is covered by a gambrel roof. On the north and west faces of the building is a one-story, L-shaped annex that was added in 1916.

When the Flour Mill was converted for commercial use the interior was partitioned into restaurant, shop and office space. A glass extension was added to the third and forth stories, which extends outward from and overhangs the main structure, to provide restaurant patrons with a view of the falls. Interior stairways provide access to the third and fourth stories, which are home to the shops and restaurants in the building. An elevator provide access to the other floors, which house office space.

As of 2022, the Flour Mill is home to numerous small and local shops and a handful of restaurants. Clinkerdagger, a restaurant known for steaks and seafood, has been located in the Flour Mill for more than 45 years. In 2018, Clinkerdagger was named one of the 100 most scenic restaurants in America by OpenTable. Another longtime tenant is Wonders of the World, a locally owned shop that imports a variety of products from around the world, from jewelry to crystals to home decor, as well as a 50,000-year-old cave bear skeleton. It has been in business at the Flower Mill since 1992. Other longtime tenants include a kitchen supply shop, tobacco shop, and Spokane's first Ethiopian restaurant.

== Gallery ==
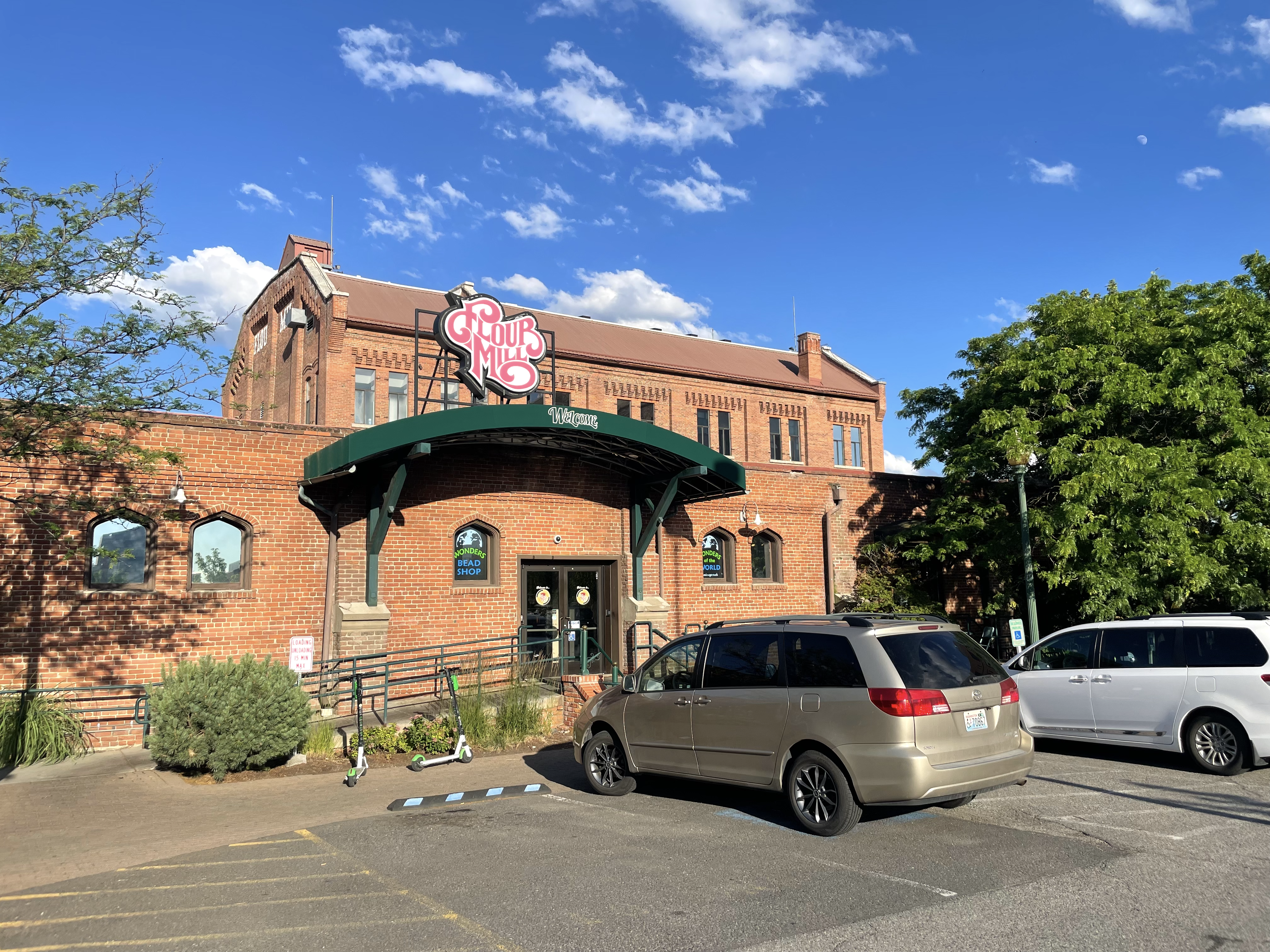
West entrance to the shopping center

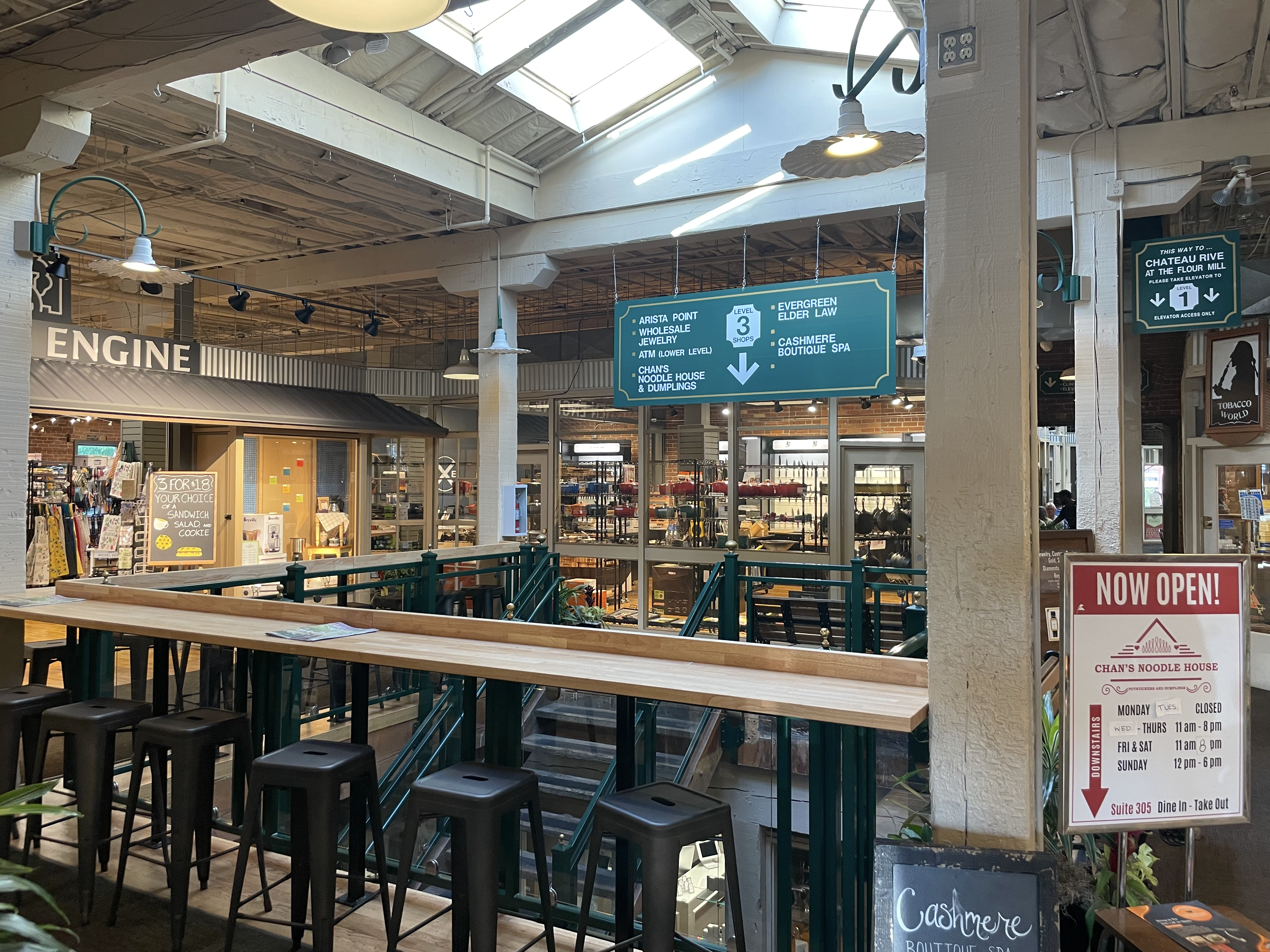
Interior of the shopping center

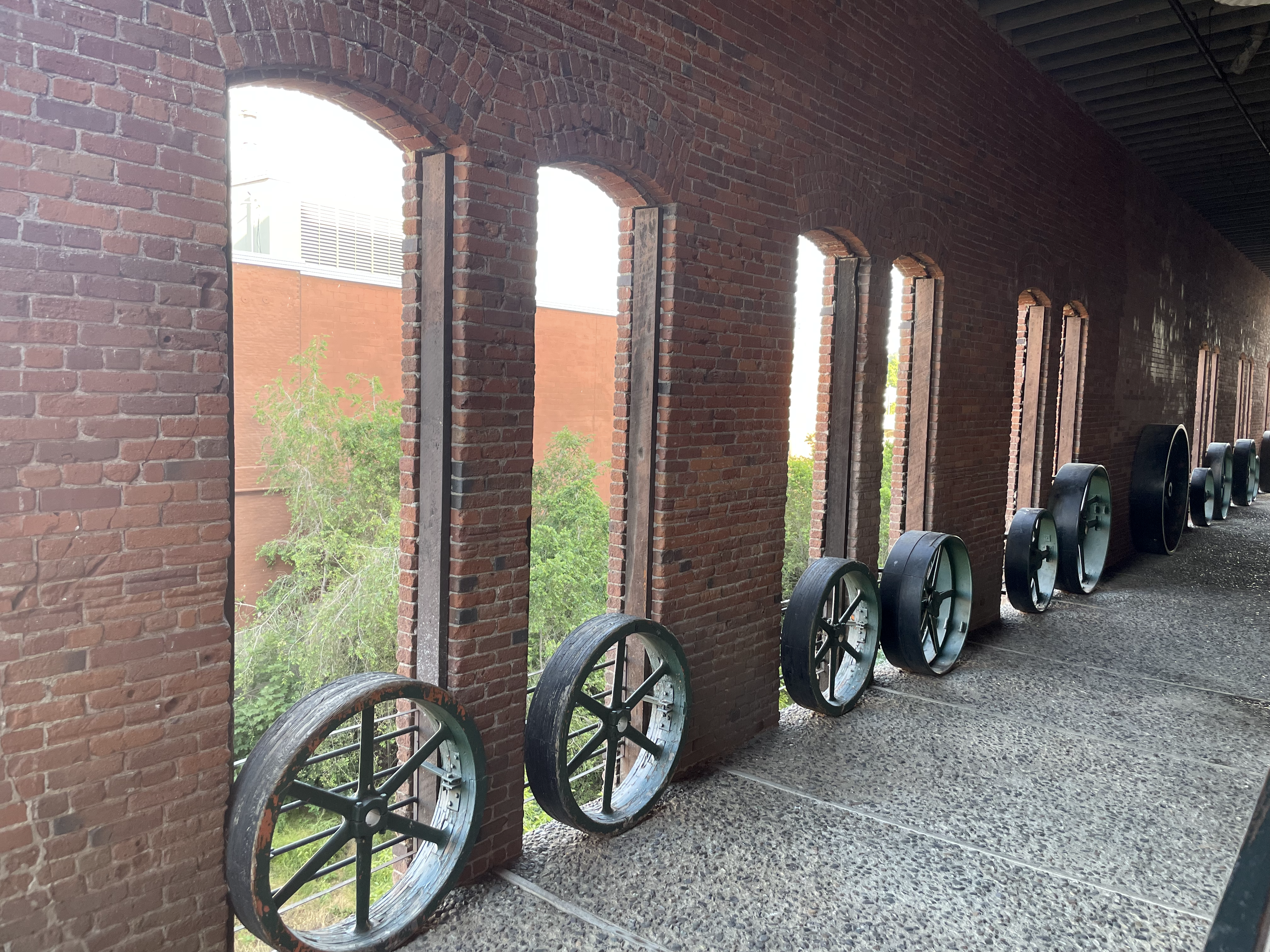
Old rail car loading bay

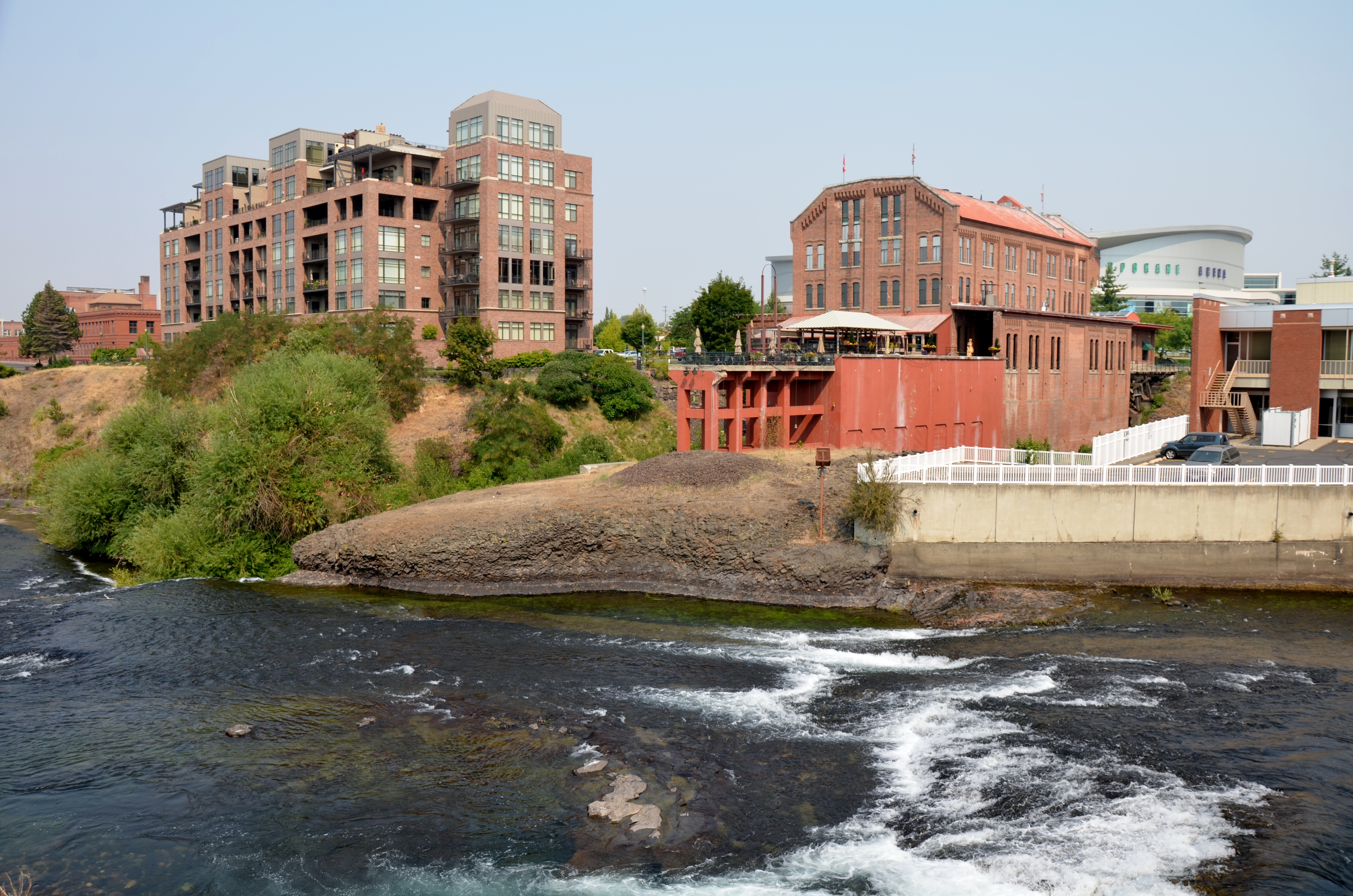
South view showing the patio at Clinkerdagger
