= Bing Crosby Theater =

Performing arts theater in Spokane, Washington

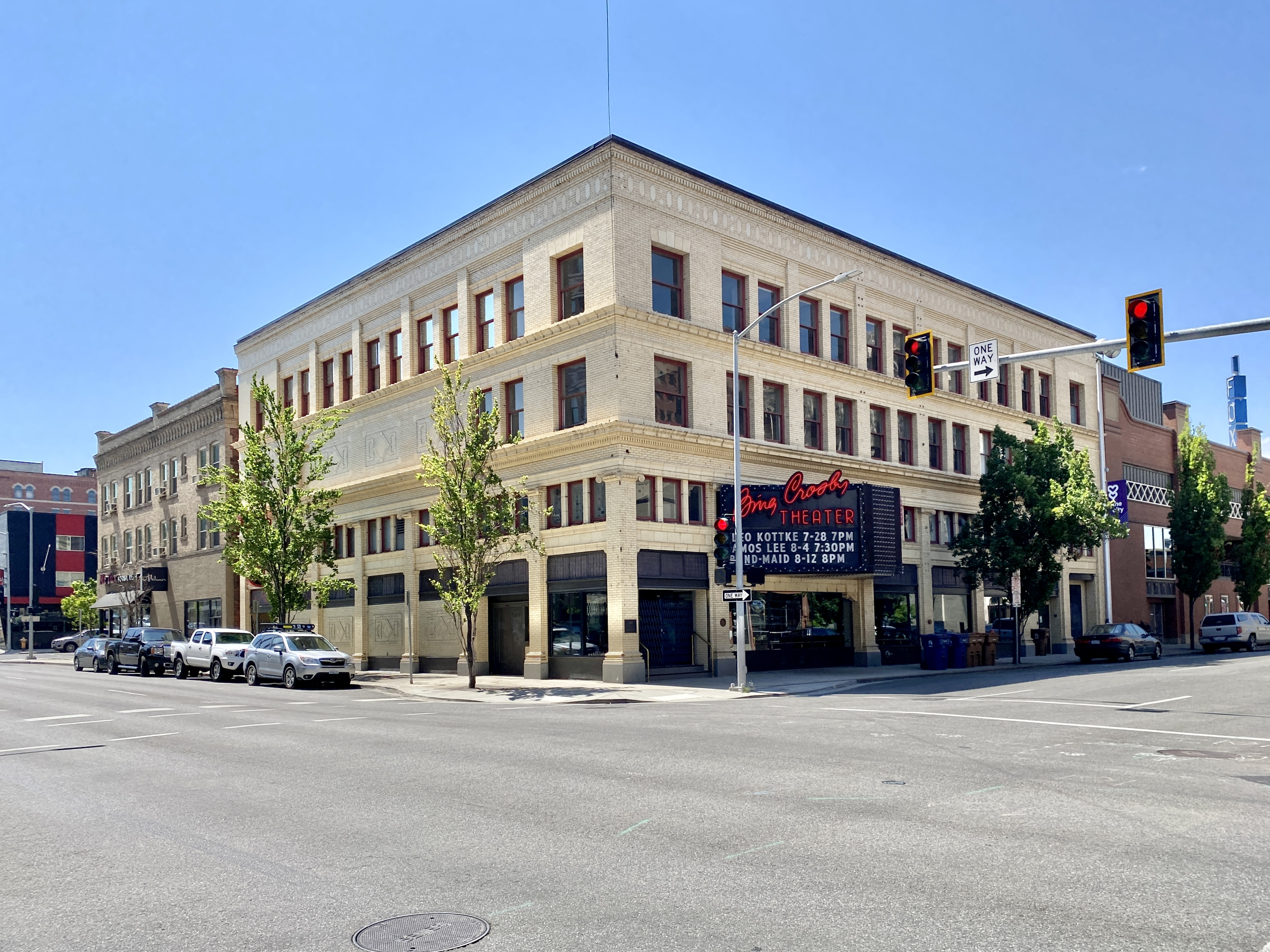
- Interactive map of Bing Crosby Theater
- Former names: Clemmer Theater, State Theater, Metropolitan Performing Arts Center
- Address: 901 West Sprague Avenue
- Location: Spokane, Washington, U.S.
- Coordinates: 47°39′25″N 117°25′31″W
- Owner: Jerry Dicker
- Capacity: 756
- Type: Theatre
- Public transit: Spokane Transit Authority

Construction
- Built: 1914
- Renovated: 1988
- Architect: Edwin W. Houghton

Website
- www.bingcrosbytheater.com
- Clemmer Theater
- U.S. National Register of Historic Places
- Architectural style: Chicago, Classical Revival
- NRHP reference No.: 88002758
- Added to NRHP: December 1, 1988

Bing Crosby Theater is a performing arts theater located in Spokane, Washington which was designed by theater architect Edwin W. Houghton. The theater was originally built in 1914 as an 800-seat movie theater called Clemmer Theater. Between August and October 1925, local singer Bing Crosby was a regular performer at the theater.

Over the years the theater fell into disrepair until it was purchased by a local company in 1988 and refurbished. The theater was placed on the National Register of Historic Places in December 1988. It was re-opened as the Metropolitan Performing Arts Center and was used for concerts, lectures, and movies. The Met was purchased by local businessman Mitch Silver in 2004 and in 2006 renamed after Bing Crosby when a local historian noticed that the city did not have any landmarks named after the multimedia star, who grew up in Spokane.
