= United States Post Office, Courthouse, and Custom House (Spokane, Washington) =

- U.S. Post Office, Courthouse, and Custom House
- U.S. National Register of Historic Places
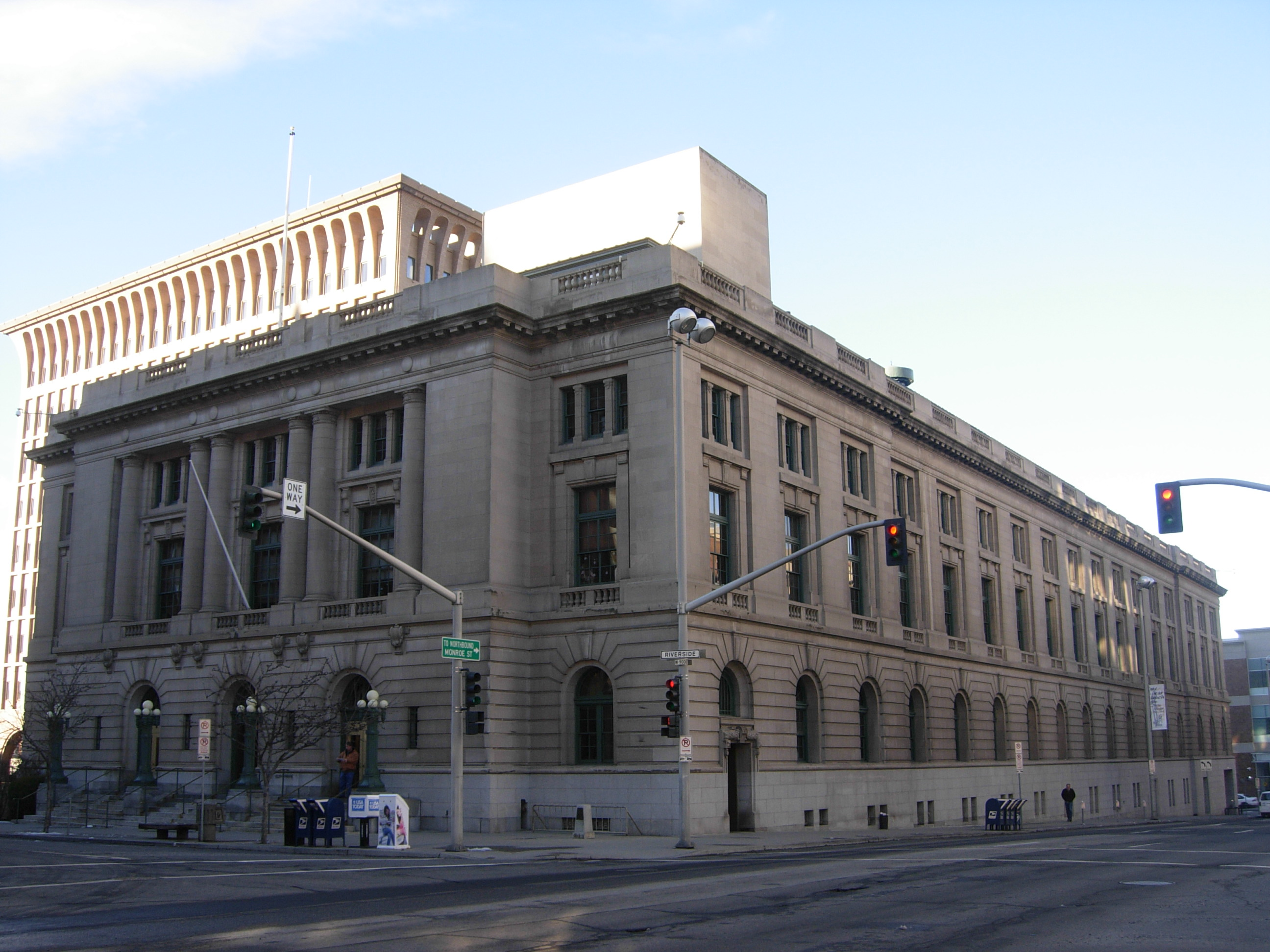
- U.S. Post Office, Courthouse, and Custom House, December 2007

- Location within Spokane riverfront area
- Location: 904 W. Riverside Ave., Spokane, Washington
- Coordinates: 47.6582°N 117.4254°W
- Area: 0.8 acres (0.32 ha)
- Built: 1906
- Architect: James Knox Taylor, Louis A. Simon
- Architectural style: Late 19th And 20th Century Revivals, Beaux Arts, Second Renaissance Revival
- NRHP reference No.: 83004269
- Added to NRHP: December 8, 1983

The Federal Building and U.S. Post Office in Spokane, Washington, is a historic post office, courthouse, and custom house building at Spokane in Spokane County, Washington. It serves as a courthouse for the United States District Court for the Eastern District of Washington.

== Building history ==
The building opened in October 1909 and was the first major federal structure built in the Inland Empire, a region encompassing parts of Washington, Oregon, Idaho, and Montana. As Spokane grew, the city required a larger post office and additional space for federal offices. The federal government acquired the site at West Riverside Avenue and Lincoln Street in 1903 for $100,000. James Knox Taylor, the Supervising Architect of the U.S. Treasury Department, designed the building in 1906 and 1907, with construction beginning in 1908 and completion in 1909.

Shortly before its public opening, President William Howard Taft visited the building, praising its "simplicity, beauty, and solidity." In early October 1909, postal workers relocated records and equipment from the old post office at Post Street and Monroe Avenue to the new building in just two days, with minimal disruption to service.

Only four months after the post office opened, rats were discovered in the basement. To remedy the problem, seven cats were allowed to live in the building, and the postmaster received $18 annually for each cat's care and feeding. The cats lived in the post office for at least one year, although no one is sure when the rat problem was solved.

As Spokane continued to grow, city officials recognized the need to expand the facility. In 1941, an addition was built on the site directly north of the original structure. The expansion was designed by Louis A. Simon, Supervising Architect of the Public Buildings Administration of the Federal Works Administration.

In 1994, a modernization effort was completed. High efficiency lighting, modern elevators, and new HVAC equipment were installed. Important interior public spaces also underwent renovation and restoration.

The Federal Building and U.S. Post Office was listed in the National Register of Historic Places in 1983. In 2004, the building won The Office Building of the Year Award in the historic category from the Building Owners and Managers Association Northwest Region.

== Architecture ==
The Federal Building and U.S. Post Office in Spokane, Washington, skillfully blends elements of two styles of architecture. Beaux Arts Classicism and Second Renaissance Revival were popular styles in the early years of the twentieth century. Both styles were often executed on monumental public buildings and feature rusticated ground floors and balustrades. The building's architect, James Knox Taylor, was a strong proponent of architecture inspired by Classical forms and ornamentation, which he believed appropriately conveyed the dignity of the federal government.

The exterior is finely detailed and proportioned. The symmetrical facade has a granite-faced basement level capped by a granite water table. The first story is clad in rusticated limestone and is dominated by arched openings. Cartouches (scrolled ovals) separate the first and second stories. The second and third stories are covered with smooth limestone and feature prominent Tuscan pilasters (attached columns) between window bays. The facade is topped with an entablature with a smooth frieze and medallions. The cornice contains a dentil course of small squares, a common feature on classical buildings. A parapet wall with a balustrade sits above the entablature.

The addition that was completed in 1941 blends harmoniously with the original 1909 building. Louis A. Simon, who designed the addition, appreciated both Modern and Colonial Revival forms of architecture. However, Simon designed the addition using Beaux Arts Classicism and Second Renaissance Revival styles to complement the existing building. Similar massing, material, and architectural details provide continuity.

The interior contains several ornate spaces. The first floor of the building contains formal public spaces such as the lobby, elevator vestibule, and main staircase. These areas have impressive proportions and finishes. Marble pilasters, floors, and wainscot; decorative plaster wall panels and coffered (recessed) ceilings; and terrazzo flooring are present.

The federal district courtroom and its lobby, which are located on the third floor, underwent renovation and restoration work in 1994. Marble floors and walls are located in the lobby, and the courtroom features rich details such as Ionic pilasters and decorative plasterwork. An oval skylight is set within an oval dome in the courtroom. Original stained oak rails, benches, and desks remain.

Offices are on the second and third floors. Wide corridors with terrazzo floors and marble baseboards separate perimeter offices from interior light courts.

In addition to the ornate spaces, the building contained a common feature in post offices of the era. The "sneak hole" was a specially constructed, enclosed gallery located above the postal workroom that allowed inspectors to secretly observe the actions of employees through strategically placed peep holes. The "sneak hole" is no longer in use today.

== Significant events ==
- 1903: Land at Riverside Avenue and Lincoln Street purchased for new Federal building
- 1909: Building completed and occupied
- 1941: Addition completed
- 1983: Building listed in the National Register of Historic Places
- 1994: Renovation and restoration completed
- 2004: Building receives The Office Building of the Year Award

== Building facts ==
- Location: West 904 Riverside Avenue
- Architects: James Knox Taylor; Louis A. Simon
- Construction Dates: 1909; 1941
- Landmark Status: Listed in the National Register of Historic Places
- Architectural Style: Beaux Arts Classicism and Second Renaissance Revival
- Primary Materials: Limestone; Granite
- Prominent Features: Monumental Facade; Ornate First-Floor Lobby; Third-Floor Courtroom with Skylight
