= Uniontown, Washington =

Uniontown
- Town
- Uniontown, Washington
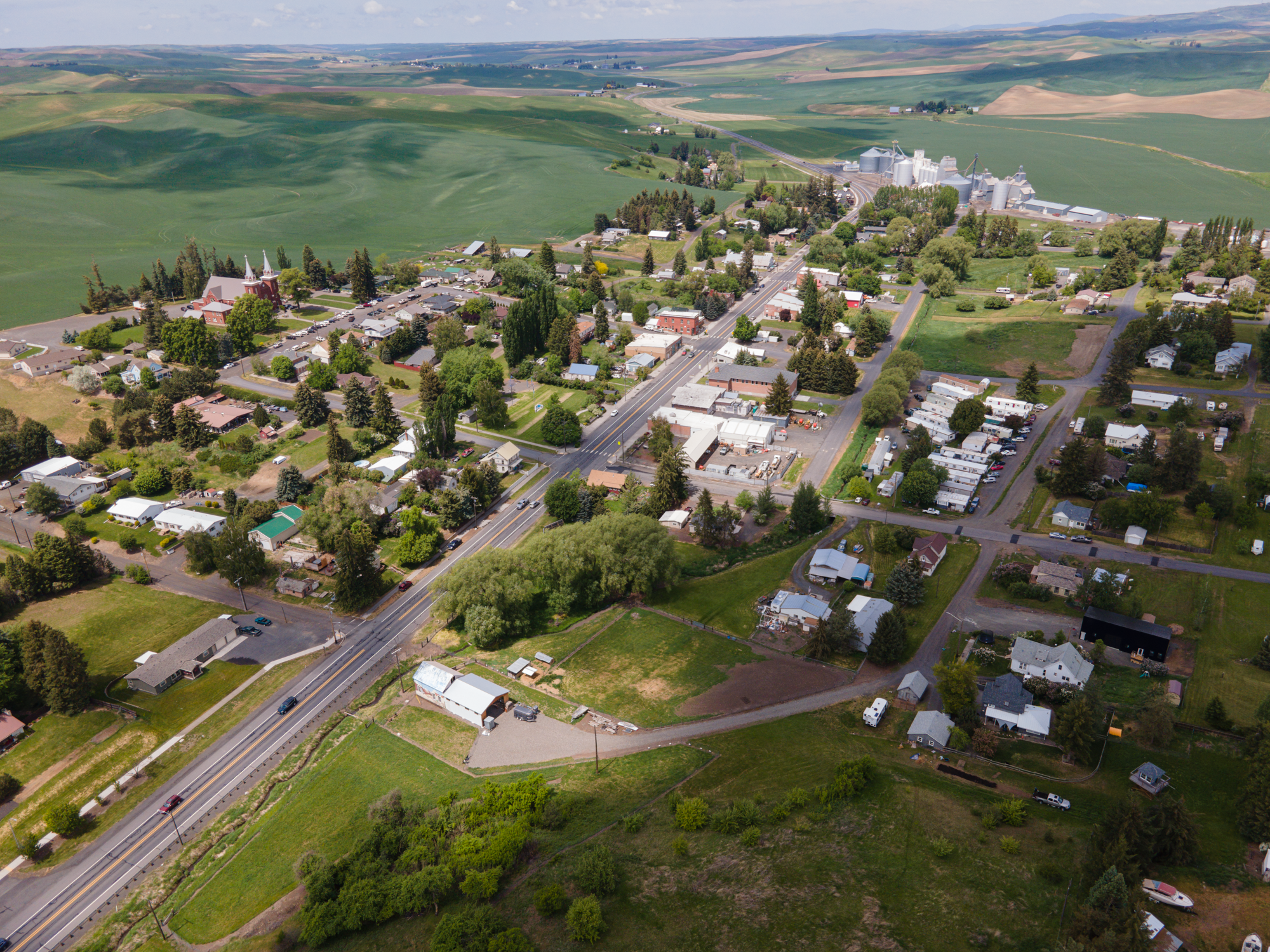
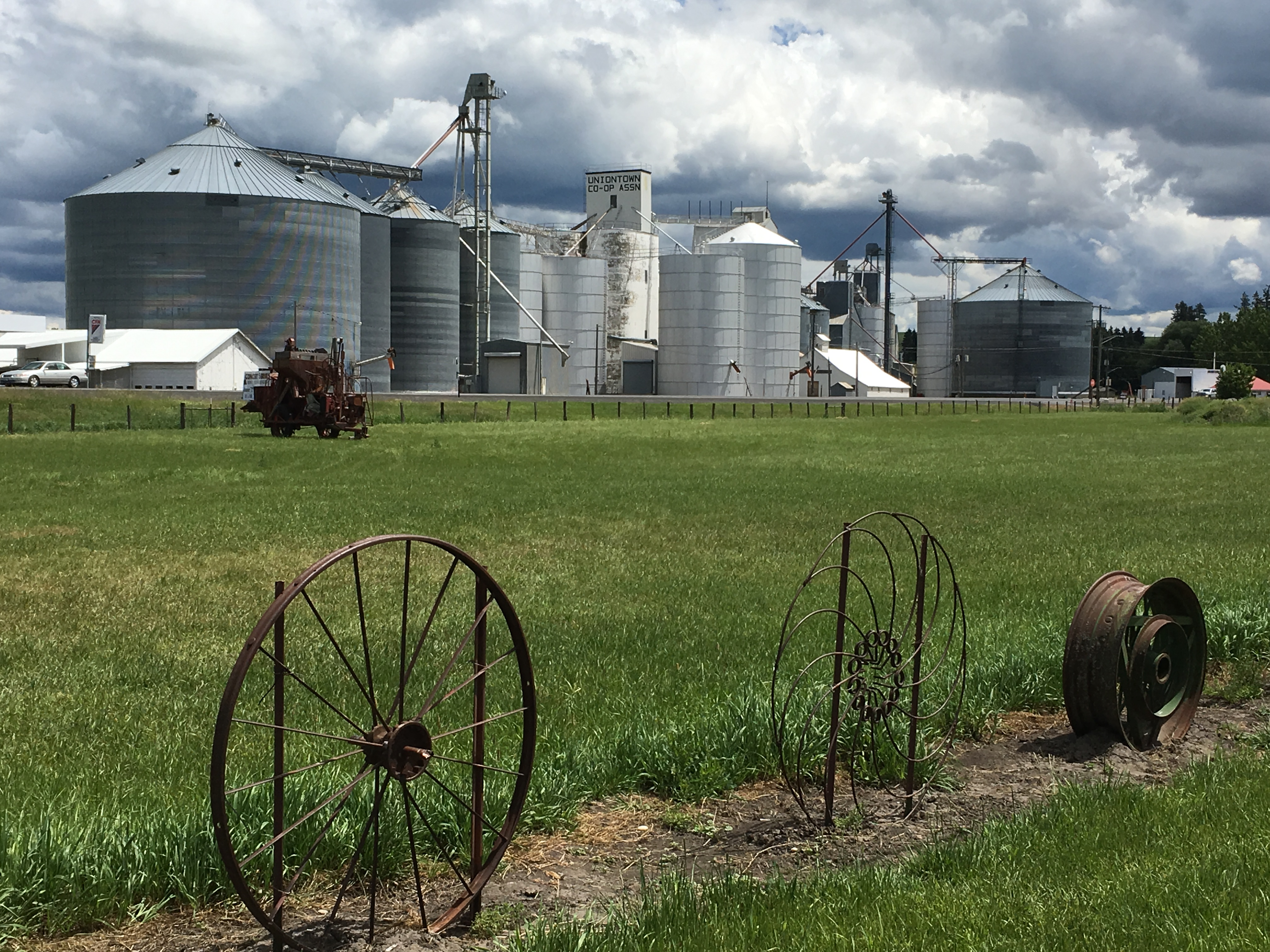
- Top: Aerial view of Uniontown in 2023, Bottom: Uniontown grain elevators alongside the highway

- Location of Uniontown, Washington
- Coordinates: 46°32′21″N 117°05′10″W
- Country: United States
- State: Washington
- County: Whitman
- Settled: 1867
- Founded: 1879
- Incorporated: 1890
- Founder: Thomas Montgomery

Government
  - Type: Mayor–council
  - Mayor: Mike Shore

Area
  - Total: 0.92 sq mi (2.39 km^{2})
  - Land: 0.92 sq mi (2.39 km^{2})
  - Water: 0 sq mi (0.00 km^{2})
- Elevation: 2,566 ft (782 m)

Population (2020)
  - Total: 389
  - Density: 422/sq mi (163/km^{2})
- Time zone: UTC-8 (Pacific (PST))
  - Summer (DST): UTC-7 (PDT)
- ZIP code: 99179
- Area code: 509
- FIPS code: 53-73360
- GNIS feature ID: 2413413
- Website: uniontownwa.org

Uniontown is a town in Whitman County, Washington, United States. The population was 389 at the 2020 census.

== History ==
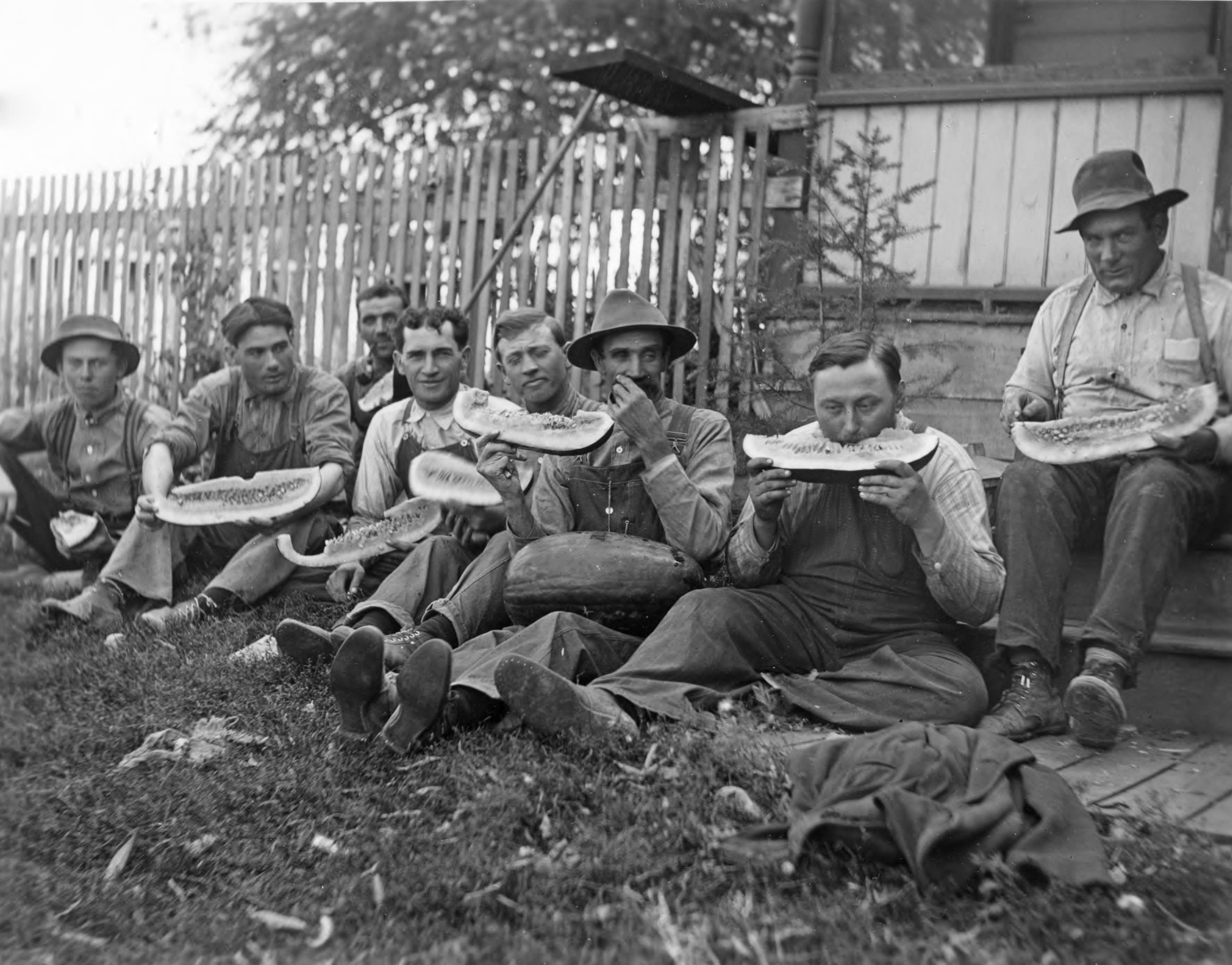
Men enjoying watermelon in Uniontown, circa 1910

Uniontown was first settled in 1867 by Thomas Freeborn Montgomery, who had travelled west in order to escape the violence of the American Civil War in 1863. Montgomery filed for a homestead claim in 1874, and obtained a post office for Uniontown in 1878. Agreement could not be reached on a town name until the following year, when Joseph Cataldo, a Jesuit priest and missionary, suggested the name "Uniontown" after the similarly-named creek and flat nearby. Montgomery had a difficult personality, which led to numerous conflicts with Uniontown businessmen. As a result, several of these businesses relocated three miles north to the neighboring rival town of Colton. Despite this, Montgomery remained active in the real estate industry in Uniontown until his passing in 1883, which was allegedly the result of a dispute that turned deadly on December 8 of that year. Uniontown was incorporated in 1890.

== Geography ==
According to the United States Census Bureau, the town has a total area of 0.93 square miles (2.41 km^{2}), all of it land.

=== Climate ===
This region experiences warm (but not hot) and dry summers, with no average monthly temperatures above 71.6 °F. According to the Köppen climate classification system, Uniontown has a warm-summer Mediterranean climate, abbreviated "Csb" on climate maps.

== Demographics ==
Historical population
Census	Pop.	Note	%±
1890	279		—
1900	404		44.8%
1910	426		5.4%
1920	404		−5.2%
1930	360		−10.9%
1940	332		−7.8%
1950	254		−23.5%
1960	242		−4.7%
1970	310		28.1%
1980	286		−7.7%
1990	277		−3.1%
2000	345		24.5%
2010	294		−14.8%
2020	389		32.3%
Source: U.S. Decennial Census

=== 2010 census ===
As of the 2010 census, there were 294 people, 130 households, and 85 families living in the town. The population density was 316.1 inhabitants per square mile (122.0/km^{2}). There were 149 housing units at an average density of 160.2 per square mile (61.9/km^{2}). The racial makeup of the town was 95.6% White, 0.3% Native American, 1.0% Asian, 0.3% from other races, and 2.7% from two or more races. Hispanic or Latino of any race were 1.4% of the population.

There were 130 households, of which 21.5% had children under the age of 18 living with them, 58.5% were married couples living together, 4.6% had a female householder with no husband present, 2.3% had a male householder with no wife present, and 34.6% were non-families. 30.0% of all households were made up of individuals, and 8.4% had someone living alone who was 65 years of age or older. The average household size was 2.26 and the average family size was 2.84.

The median age in the town was 44.6 years. 18.7% of residents were under the age of 18; 9.5% were between the ages of 18 and 24; 22.5% were from 25 to 44; 32.3% were from 45 to 64; and 17% were 65 years of age or older. The gender makeup of the town was 51.4% male and 48.6% female.

=== 2000 census ===
As of the 2000 census, there were 345 people, 133 households, and 96 families living in the town. The population density was 380.1 people per square mile (146.4/km^{2}). There were 160 housing units at an average density of 176.3 per square mile (67.9/km^{2}). The racial makeup of the town was 97.10% White, 0.58% Asian, 2.32% from other races. Hispanic or Latino of any race were 4.64% of the population.

There were 133 households, out of which 33.1% had children under the age of 18 living with them, 60.2% were married couples living together, 9.8% had a female householder with no husband present, and 27.1% were non-families. 22.6% of all households were made up of individuals, and 6.8% had someone living alone who was 65 years of age or older. The average household size was 2.59 and the average family size was 3.06.

In the town, the age distribution of the population shows 29.6% under the age of 18, 6.7% from 18 to 24, 26.7% from 25 to 44, 24.3% from 45 to 64, and 12.8% who were 65 years of age or older. The median age was 37 years. For every 100 females, there were 97.1 males. For every 100 females age 18 and over, there were 99.2 males.

The median income for a household in the town was $36,042, and the median income for a family was $46,250. Males had a median income of $31,607 versus $21,250 for females. The per capita income for the town was $16,390. About 2.1% of families and 2.3% of the population were below the poverty line, including 1.8% of those under age 18 and 4.2% of those age 65 or over.

== Churches ==
=== Saint Boniface Catholic Church ===
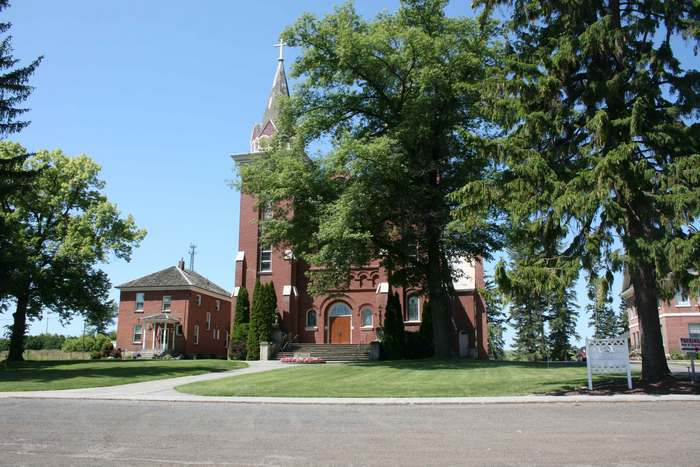
Saint Boniface Church, Convent & Rectory

The vast majority of the early settlers of Uniontown were primarily Swiss and German immigrants who practiced Roman Catholicism. The first Catholic Church in Uniontown was built out of wood in 1879, the same year that Uniontown was officially founded. Father Anton Joehren, the local Catholic priest, played a constructive role in the early history of Uniontown, although like founder Thomas Montgomery, Joehren’s difficult nature often led to disputes. In 1888, he began plans to construct a grand brick and stone church, but construction ceased in 1893 when a dispute arose between the priest and some parishioners, resulting in only a foundation being laid. Friction with Fr. Joehren also led to the Benedictine Sisters relocating from Uniontown to Colton in 1894 and ultimately establishing the St. Gertrude Monastery in Cottonwood, Idaho in 1906. Following Fr. Joehren's removal, a new priest oversaw the congregation's construction of the current church, St. Boniface Church, which was completed in the spring of 1905, and consecrated in 1910, making it the first to be consecrated in the state of Washington. The church was designed by Herman Preusse and Julius Zittel and is built out of bricks in the Romanesque style, with two towers flanking the façade, and a front gable topped by a seven-foot statue of the Blessed Mother. The church retains much of its original pre-Vatican II appearance, including original stained-glass windows, altar rails, numerous statues, five altars, and numerous frescos. The church has resisted all attempts and proposals to modernize the interior and has insisted on keeping it as is, the only allowed noticeable change being the installment of an altar to celebrate the Novus Ordo facing the people.

=== Uniontown Community Church ===
There is also a small, non-denominational Christian, protestant church that is maintained by its congregants.
