= Loren L. Rand =

American architect (1851–1935)

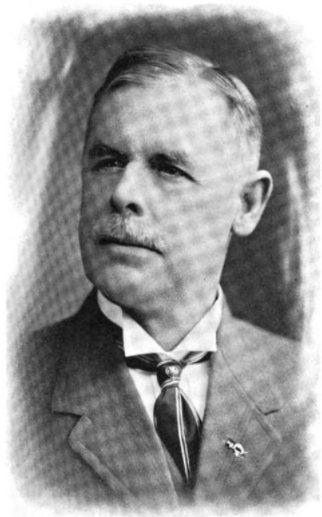
- Born: December 23, 1851; Amesbury, Massachusetts, U.S.
- Died: October 6, 1935 (aged 83); Spokane, Washington, U.S.
- Education: Massachusetts Institute of Technology
- Occupation: Architect
- Spouse: Luanna O. Rice (m. 1876)
- Children: 3

Loren Leighton Rand (December 23, 1851 - October 6, 1935) was an American architect.

== Biography ==
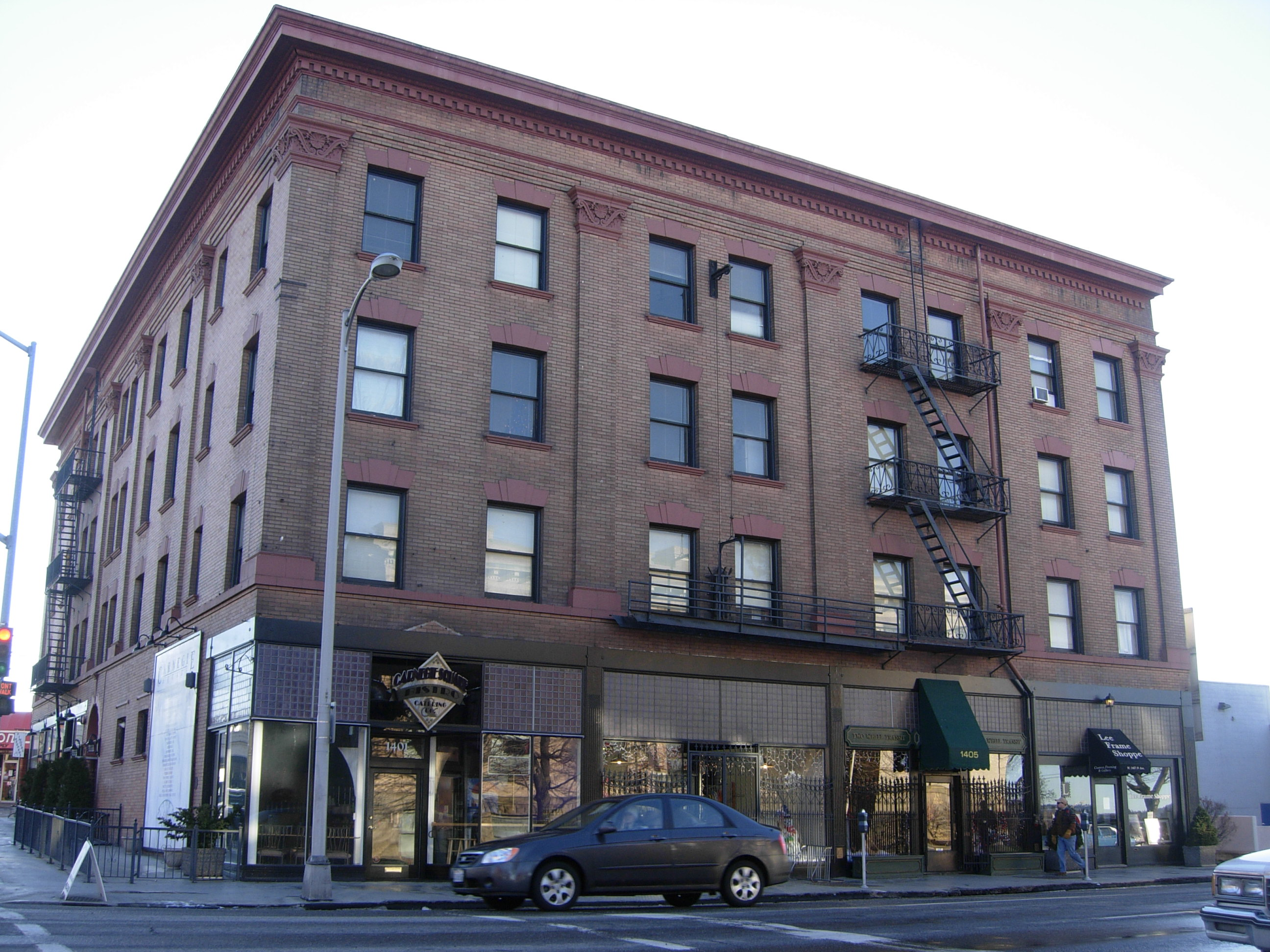
Hotel Upton, designed by Rand

Loren L. Rand was born in Amesbury, Massachusetts on December 23, 1851. He married Luanna O. Rice on September 25, 1876, and they had three children.

He graduated from MIT and became an architect in Grand Rapids, Michigan and Minneapolis, Minnesota before settling in Spokane, Washington in 1888. He designed the NRHP-listed Hotel Upton in Spokane. With John K. Dow, he designed the NRHP-listed Bump Block-Bellevue House-Hawthorne Hotel.

He died at his home in Spokane on October 6, 1935.
