= Benewah County Courthouse =

- U.S. National Register of Historic Places
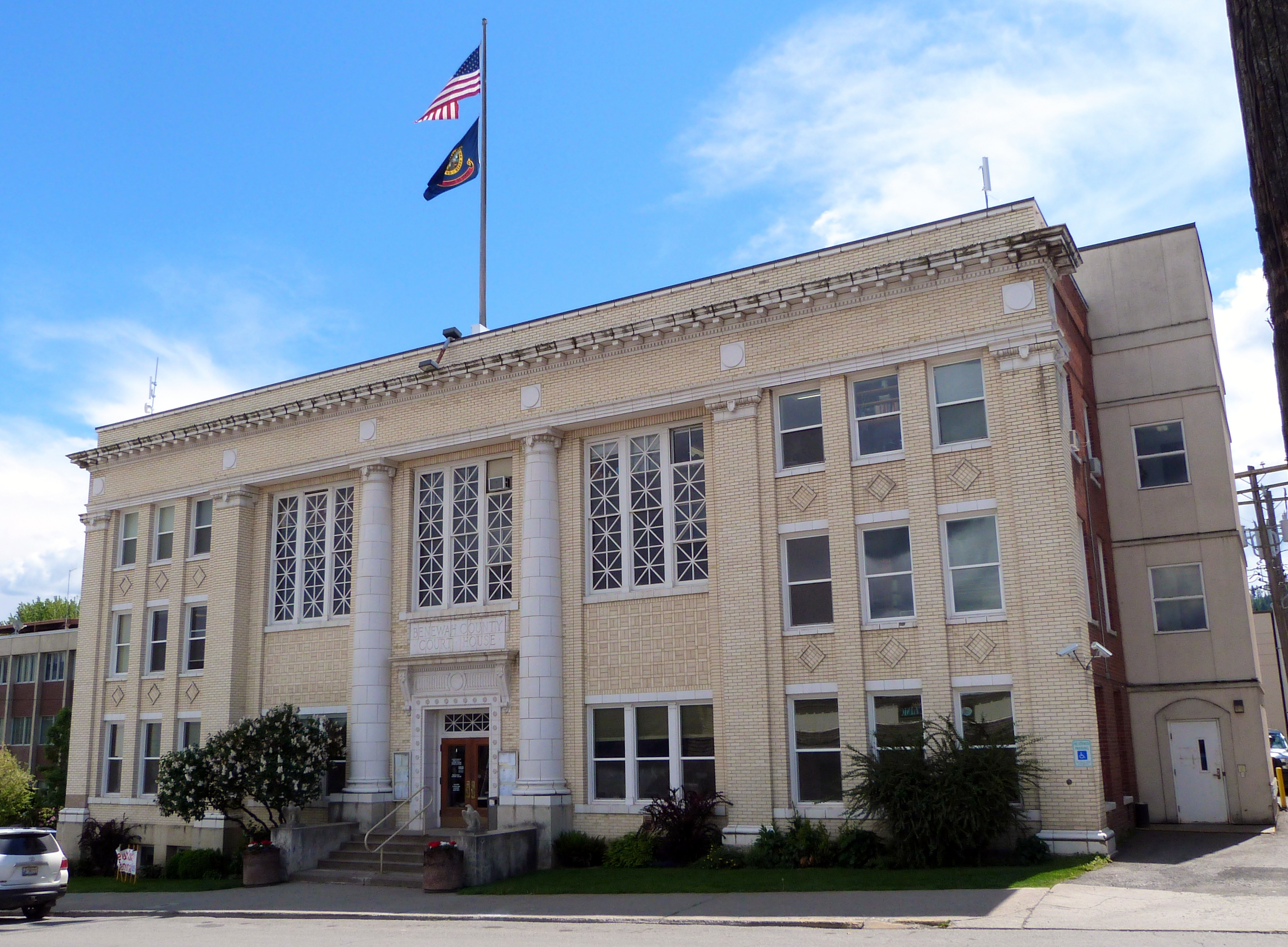
- The Benewah County Courthouse in 2015

- Location within Idaho Location within the United States
- Location: College Ave. and Seventh St., St. Maries, Idaho
- Coordinates: 47°18′54″N 116°34′01″W
- Area: less than one acre
- Built: 1924
- Built by: Meyers & Telender
- Architect: Julius Zittel
- Architectural style: Classical Revival
- MPS: County Courthouses in Idaho MPS
- NRHP reference No.: 87001580
- Added to NRHP: September 22, 1987

The Benewah County Courthouse is a building located in St. Maries, Idaho listed on the National Register of Historic Places.

It is a three-story building which is brick on two sides and brick veneer on two others. It has a terra cotta entry surround including a bas relief rosette design. The building has a denticulated terra cotta cornice.

It was designed by Spokane architect Julius Zittel and built by Spokane contractors Meyers and Telender.

== See also ==
- List of National Historic Landmarks in Idaho
- National Register of Historic Places listings in Benewah County, Idaho
