= Bump Block-Bellevue House-Hawthorne Hotel =

- Bump Block--Bellevue House--Hawthorne Hotel
- U.S. National Register of Historic Places
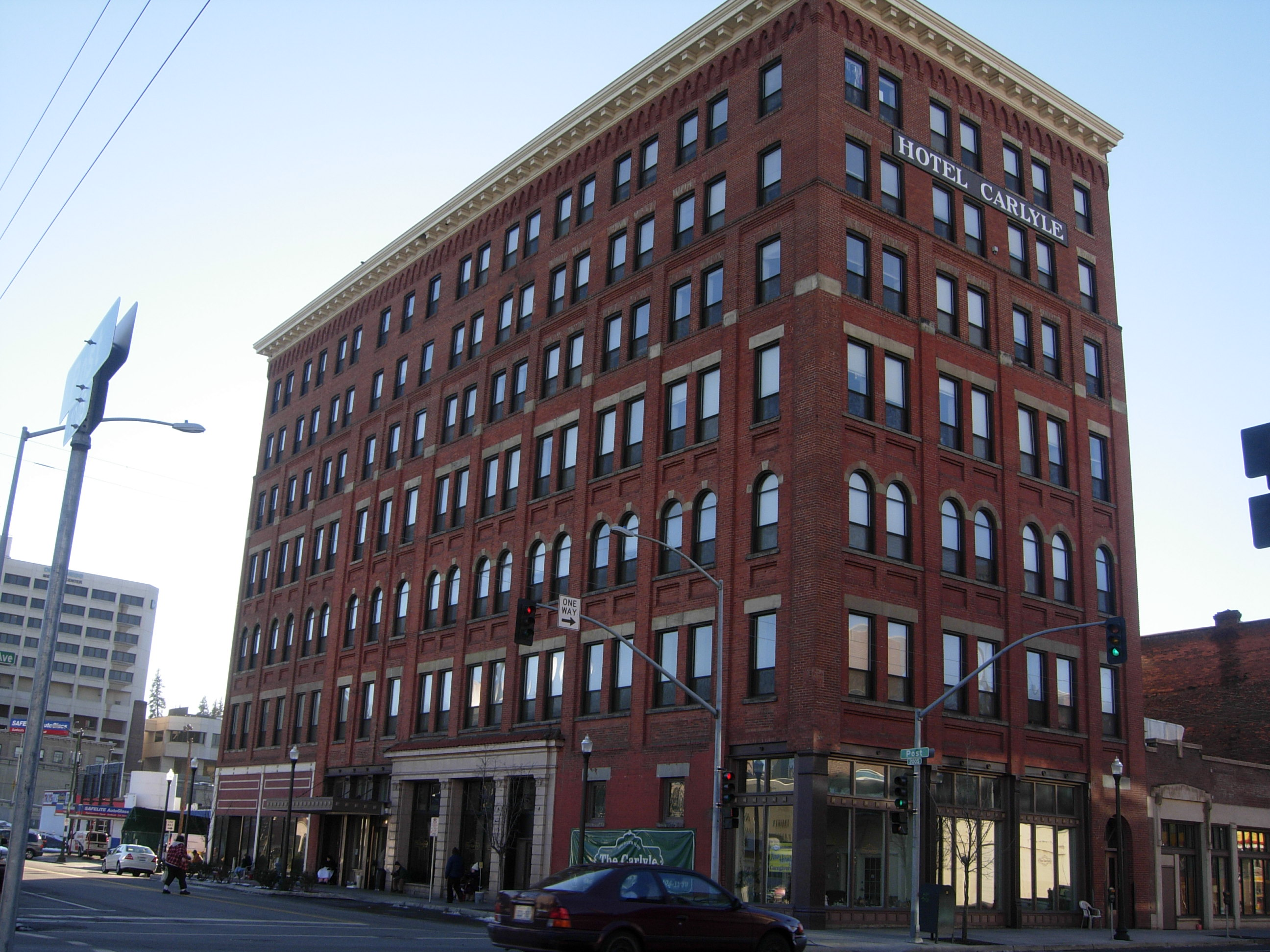
- The building in 2007

- Location within Spokane riverfront area
- Location: South 206 Post Street, Spokane, Washington
- Coordinates: 47°39′16″N 117°25′22″W
- Area: less than one acre
- Built: 1890
- Architect: Loren L. Rand & John K. Dow; Herman Preusse & Julius Zittel
- Architectural style: Early Commercial
- MPS: Single Room Occupancy Hotels in Central Business District of Spokane MPS
- NRHP reference No.: 00000977
- Added to NRHP: August 10, 2000

The Bump Block-Bellevue House-Hawthorne Hotel is a historic seven-story building in Downtown Spokane, Washington. It was first built in 1890, and designed by architects Loren L. Rand and John K. Dow. It was expanded in 1909, and redesigned by architects Herman Preusse and Julius Zittel. It has been listed on the National Register of Historic Places since August 10, 2000.
