= Peyton Building and Peyton Annex =

United States historic place in Spokane, Washington

- U.S. National Register of Historic Places
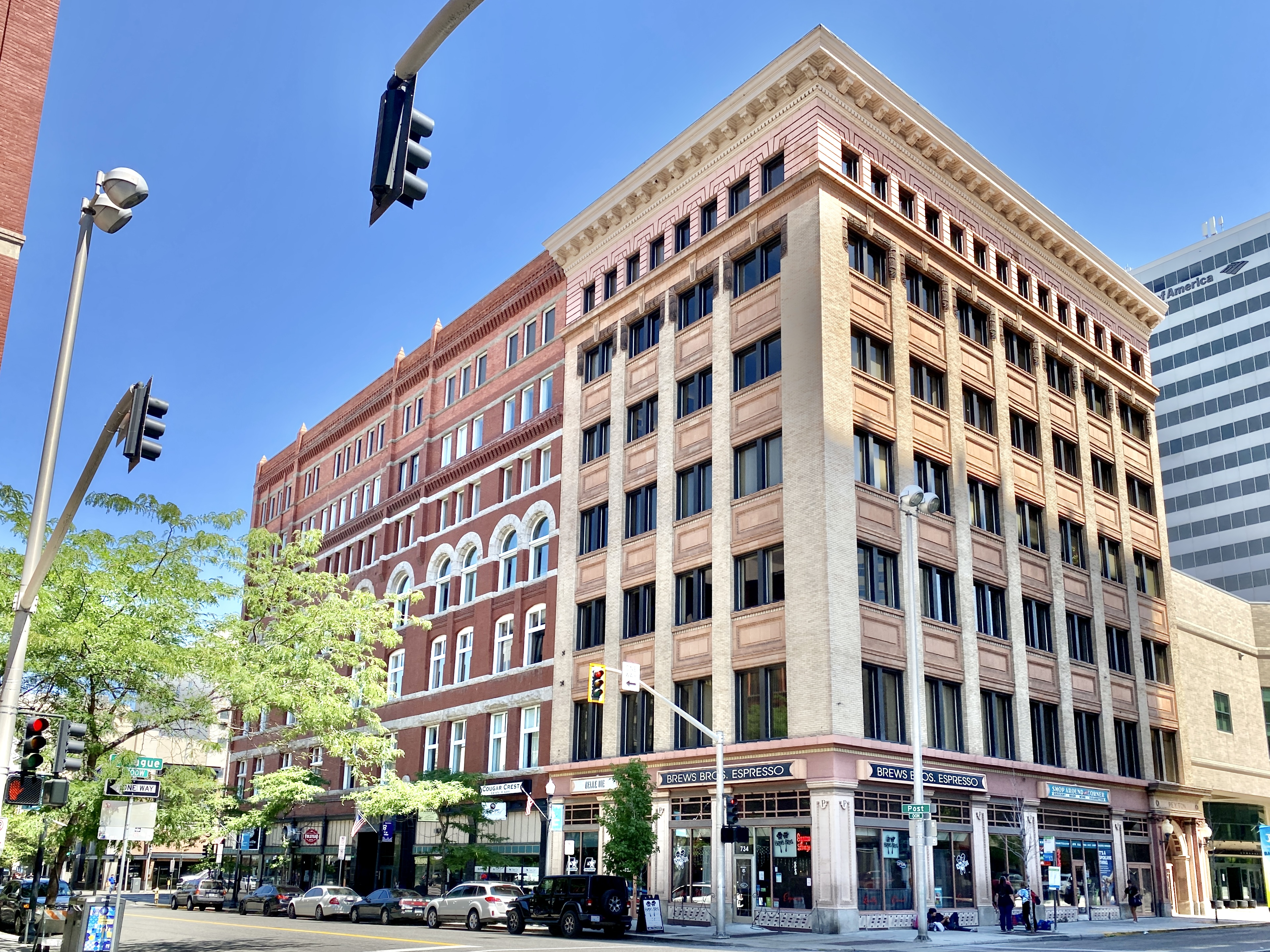
- The building in 2023

- Location within Spokane riverfront area
- Location: 722 West Sprague Ave./10 North Post Street, Spokane, Washington
- Coordinates: 47°39′27″N 117°25′24″W
- Area: less than one acre
- Built: 1898
- Architect: Cutter & Malmgren; Robert Sweatt
- Architectural style: Romanesque, Early Commercial
- NRHP reference No.: 05000191
- Added to NRHP: March 15, 2005

The Peyton Building and Peyton Annex is a historic seven-story building and annex in Spokane, Washington. The building was designed by Cutter & Malmgren, and built in 1898. It was built on the site of a former building known as the Great Eastern Building, designed by Herman Preusse and completed in 1890. The annex was designed by Robert Sweatt, and built in 1908. It has been listed on the National Register of Historic Places since March 15, 2005.
