= Spokane Public Library - Main =

- Spokane Public Library
- U.S. National Register of Historic Places
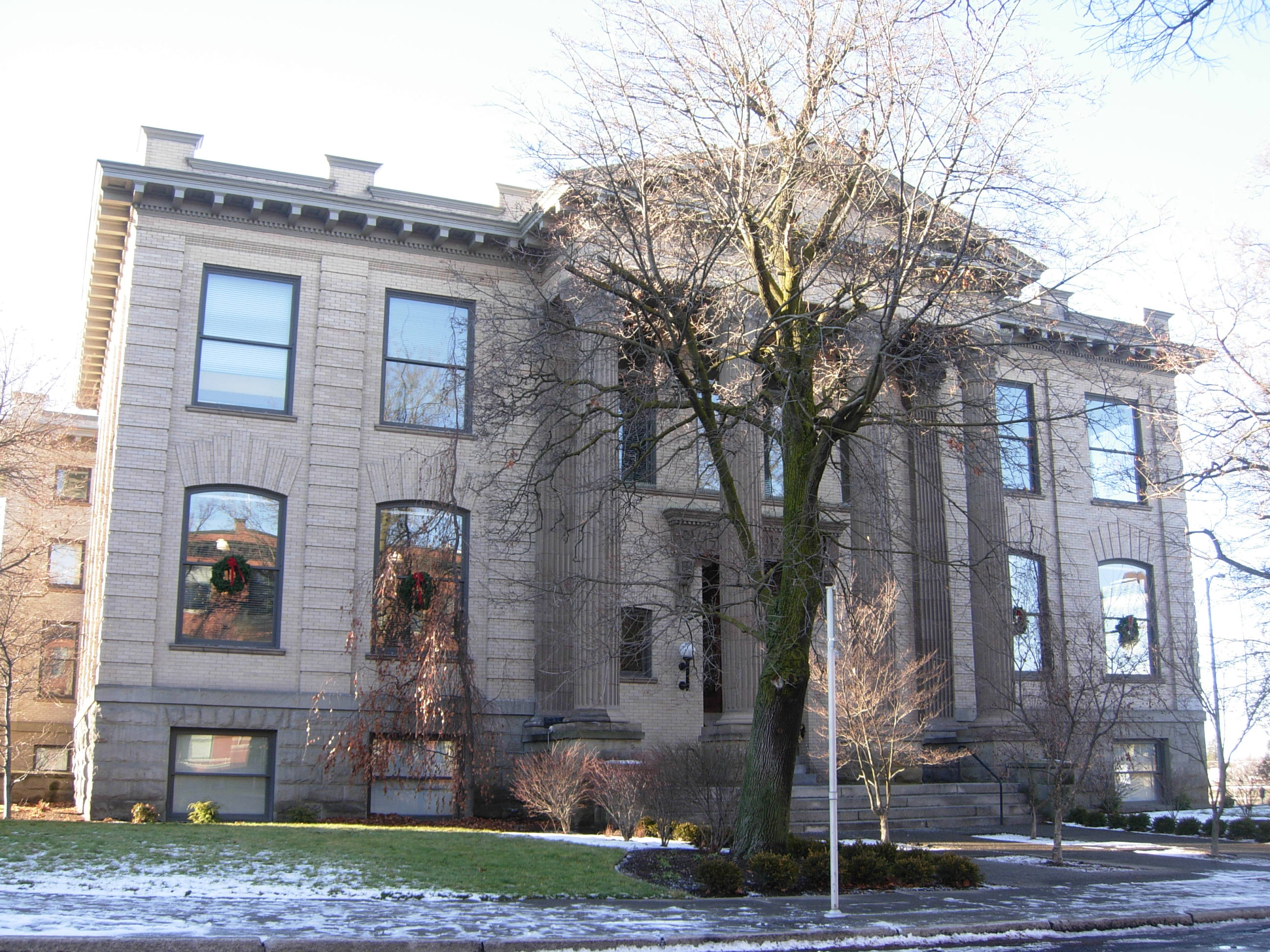
- The building in 2007

- Location within Spokane riverfront area
- Location: 10 South Cedar, Spokane, Washington
- Coordinates: 47°39′24.3″N 117°25′59″W
- Area: less than one acre
- Built: 1905
- Architect: Herman Preusse & Julius Zittel
- MPS: Carnegie Libraries of Washington TR
- NRHP reference No.: 82004910
- Added to NRHP: August 3, 1982

The Spokane Public Library is a historic building in Spokane, Washington. It was designed by architects Herman Preusse and Julius Zittel, and built in 1905. Its construction cost $100,000, with $85,000 coming from Andrew Carnegie. It has been listed on the National Register of Historic Places (NRHP) since August 3, 1982. The library is one of four historic structures at the intersection of First and Cedar. To the south across First is the Grand Coulee building. To the southeast across Cedar and First is the Eldridge Building. All three are listed on the NRHP. Additionally, the Buena Vista Apartments across Cedar are listed as a secondary contributing property to the Riverside Avenue Historic District, to which the Carnegie Library building is listed as a primary contributing property.
