= St. Boniface Church, Convent and Rectory =

Historic church in Washington, United States

St. Boniface Church
- St. Boniface Catholic Church, Convent and Rectory
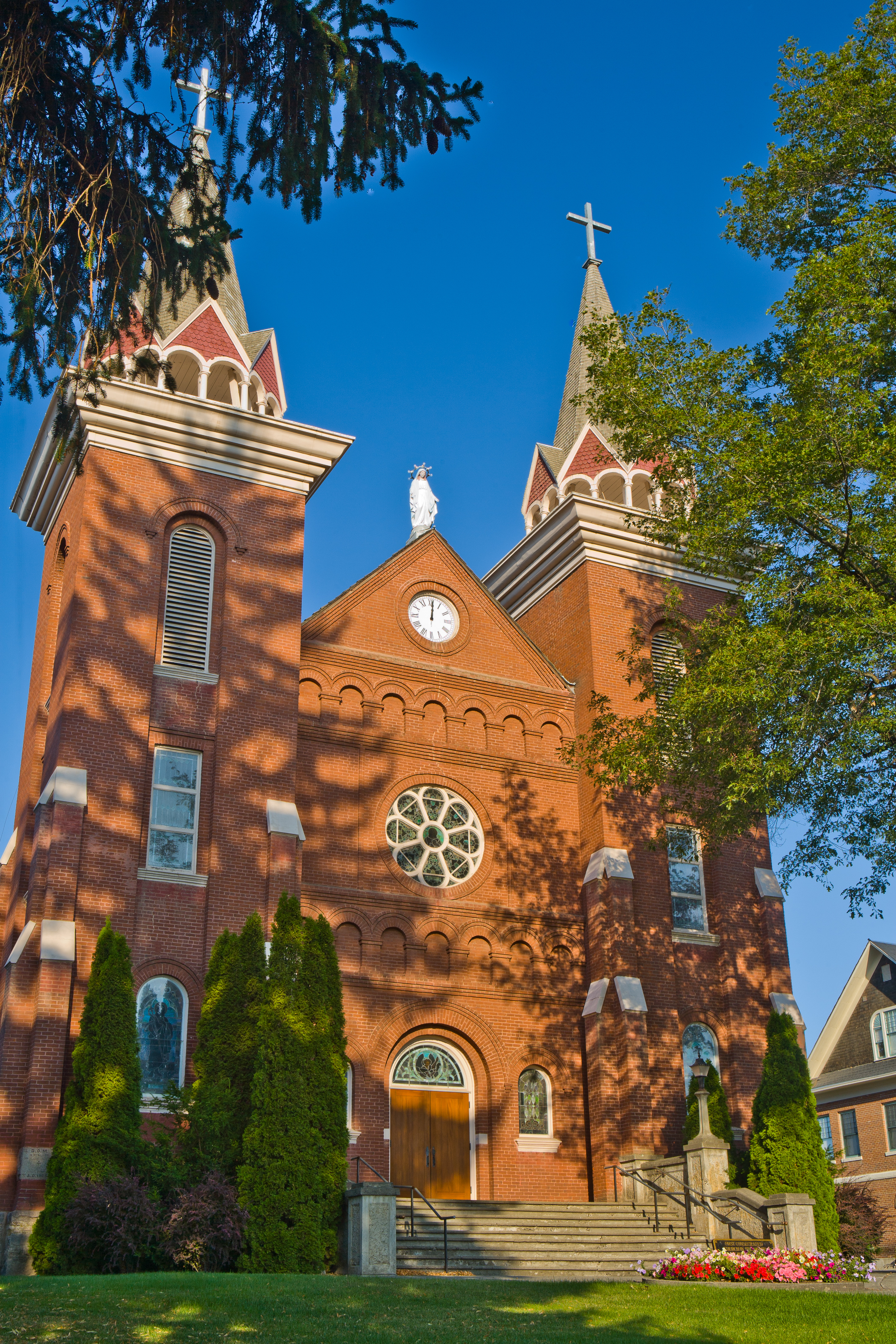
- St. Boniface in 2008
- St. Boniface Church
- 46°32′25″N 117°5′27″W
- Location: 212 S St Boniface St, Uniontown, Washington
- Country: United States
- Denomination: Roman Catholic
- Website: stgbcc.org

History
- Dedicated: November 21, 1905
- Consecrated: 1910

Architecture
- Architect(s): Herman Preusse; Julius Zittel
- Architectural type: Neo-Romanesque
- Years built: 1888-1905

Administration
- Archdiocese: Archdiocese of Seattle
- Diocese: Diocese of Spokane
- St. Boniface Church, Convent and Rectory
- U.S. National Register of Historic Places
- Nearest city: Uniontown, Washington
- Coordinates: 46°32′25″N 117°5′27″W
- Area: 3 acres (1.2 ha)
- Built: 1905
- NRHP reference No.: 94001433
- Added to NRHP: December 9, 1994

St. Boniface Church, Convent and Rectory is a historic site in Uniontown, Washington, United States. It was built in 1905, consecrated in 1910, making it the first to be consecrated in the state of Washington, and added to the National Register of Historic Places in 1994.

== History ==
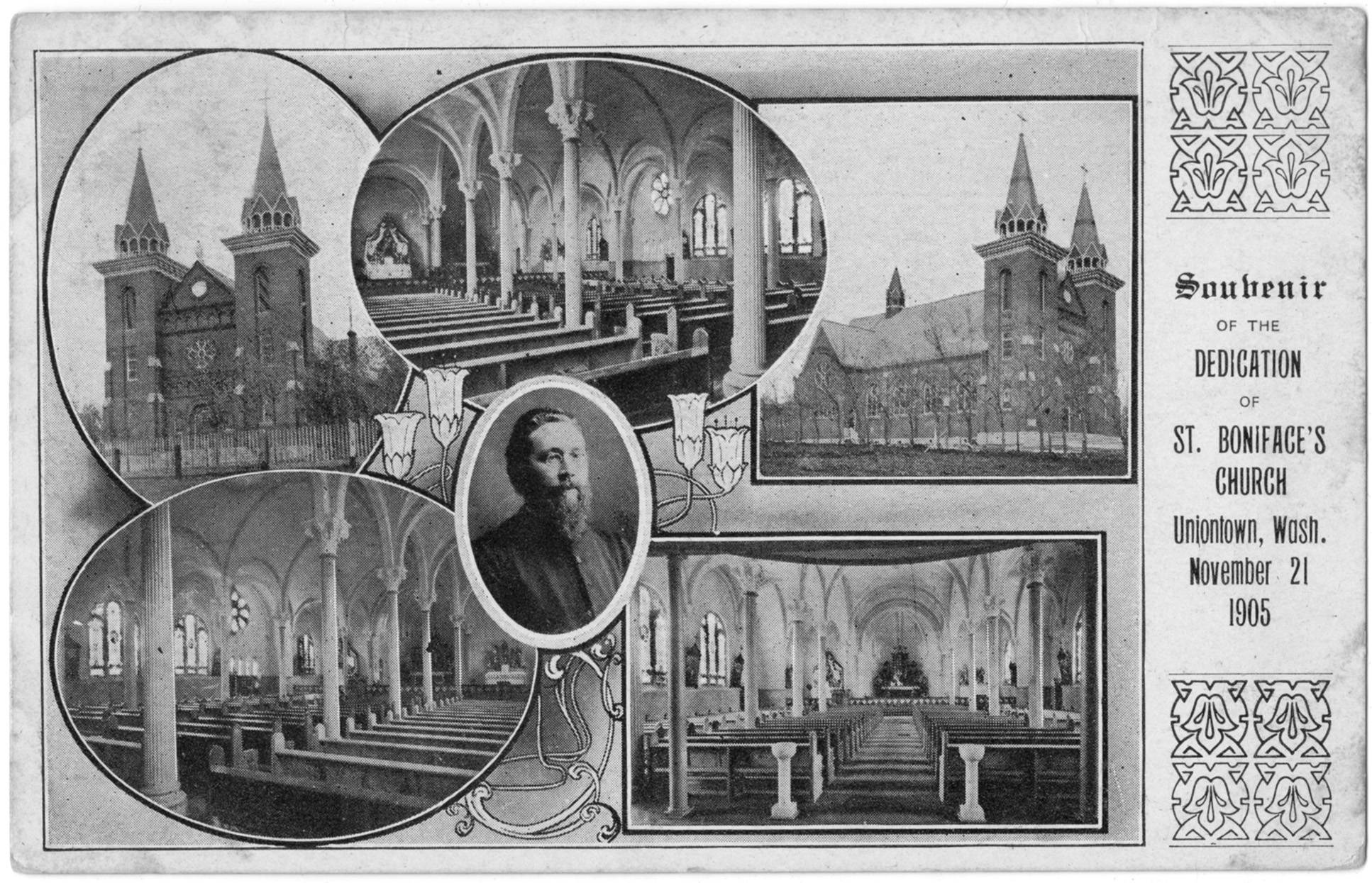
Souvenir of the dedication of St. Boniface Church in 1905

The early settlers of Uniontown were Catholics and the Catholic Church was involved with the development of Uniontown from the very start, the first Catholic Church in Uniontown was built in 1879, which was the same year that Uniontown was officially founded. By the 1880s, the local church had become too small so in 1888 Fr. Anton Joehren began drafting plans to construct a grand brick and stone church. The building foundation was laid in 1893 by German Catholic immigrants. However, construction was postponed due to economic downturn and disagreements between Fr. Joehren and several parishioners and as a result the construction was postponed for 11 years until they were able to begin building again. The parish of Saint Boniface was established in 1903 and the church was completed in the spring of 1905 and dedicated in November of that year, and consecrated in 1910, making it the first to be consecrated in the state of Washington.

== The Church ==
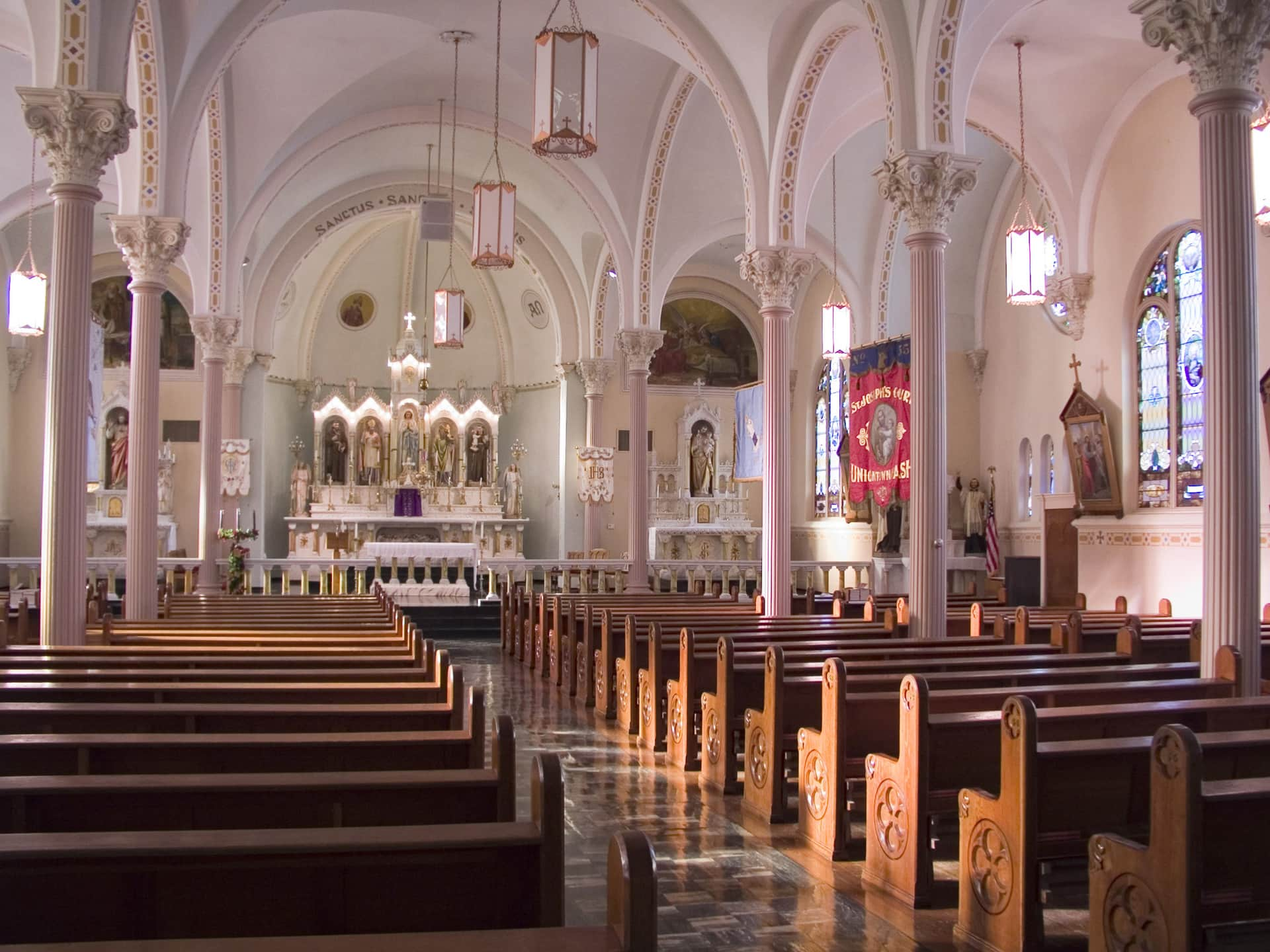
The Interior of St. Boniface

Given that Uniontown was settled by ethnic Germans the name of the church reflects its German heritage, being dedicated to Saint Boniface, the German apostle. The church was designed by Herman Preusse and Julius Zittel and is built out of bricks in the Romanesque style, complete with two towers flanking the façade, and a front gable topped by a seven-foot statue of the Blessed Mother. In addition, the church has retained much of its original pre-Vatican II appearance, including the original stained-glass windows, altar rails, several statues, five altars, and numerous frescos. The church has resisted all attempts and proposals to modernize the interior and have insisted on keeping it as is in order to preserve its history, the only allowed noticeable change has been the installment of an altar to celebrate the Novus Ordo facing the people.

=== St. Boniface and St. Gall parishes ===
St. Boniface is served by the same priest that serves in Colton at the Church of St. Gall, the two churches are separate parishes but they both work together, share a website, and share a pastor which effectively makes them one parish. Guardian Angel - St. Boniface School is a parochial school that started out teaching first grade through twelfth, but in later years only had grades first through eighth. The school was eventually torn down and relocated in Colton. The school is run by both parishes in cooperation with one-another.
