= Hotel Upton =

- U.S. National Register of Historic Places
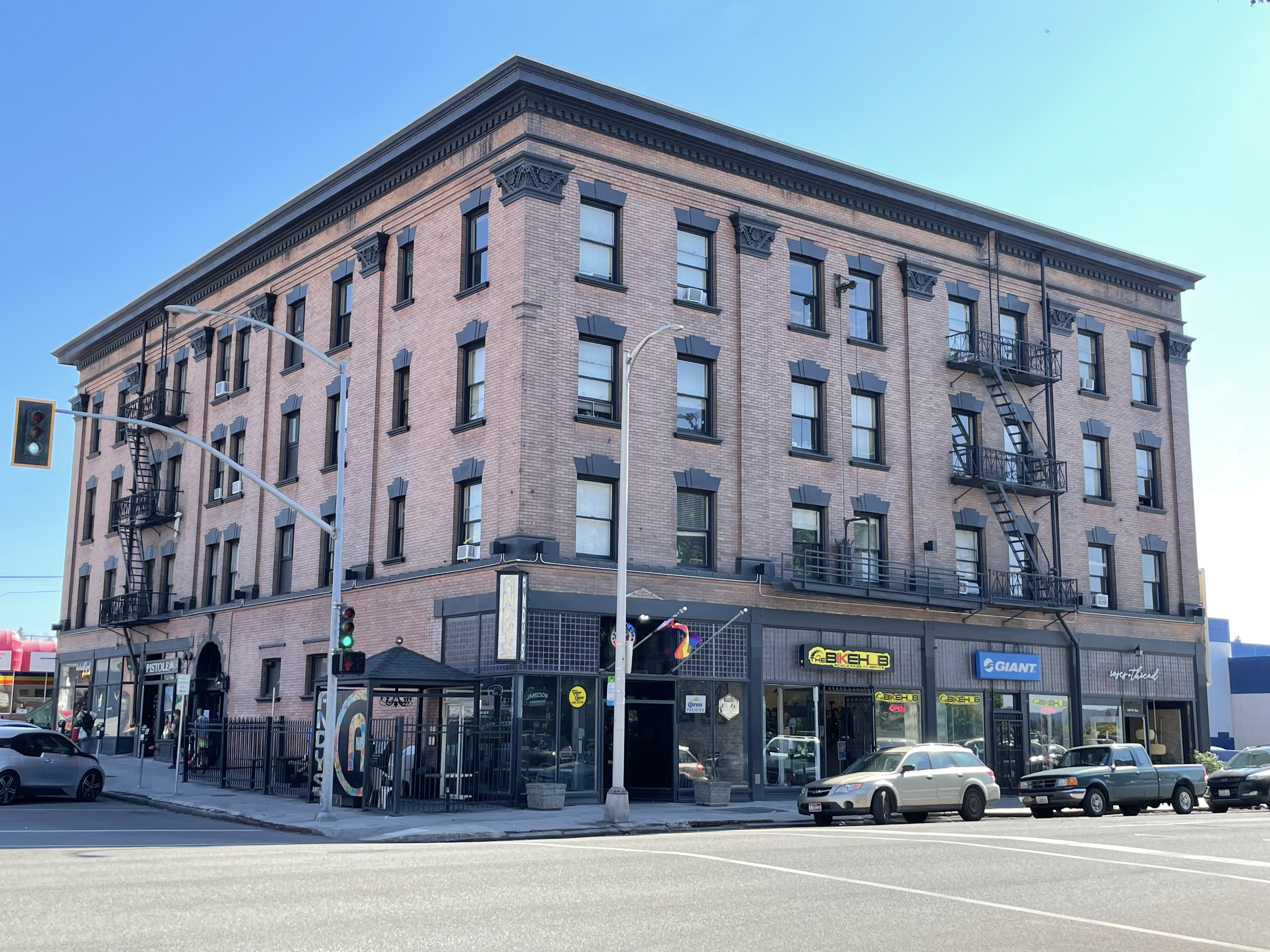
- The building in 2022

- Location within Spokane riverfront area
- Location: South 106 Cedar Street, Spokane, Washington
- Coordinates: 47°39′23″N 117°25′57″W
- Area: less than one acre
- Architect: Loren L. Rand
- Architectural style: Late 19th And Early 20th Century American Movements
- MPS: Single Room Occupancy Hotels in Central Business District of Spokane MPS
- NRHP reference No.: 94000798
- Added to NRHP: July 29, 1994

Hotel Upton, also known as Grand Coulee Hotel and Grand Coulee Apartments, is a historic four-story building in Spokane, Washington. It was designed by Loren L. Rand, and built as a 102-room hotel in 1910. It was renamed the Grand Coulee Hotel in 1933. It has been listed on the National Register of Historic Places since July 29, 1994. It is one of three historic buildings at the intersection of First Avenue and Cedar Street listed on the NRHP. To the east across Cedar is the Eldridge Building and to the north across First is the former Carnegie Library.

The building is a contributing property to the West Downtown Historic Transportation Corridor.
