= St. Gertrude's Convent and Chapel =

American Benedictine monastery of nuns and national historic site

- Monastery of St. Gertrude
- U.S. National Register of Historic Places
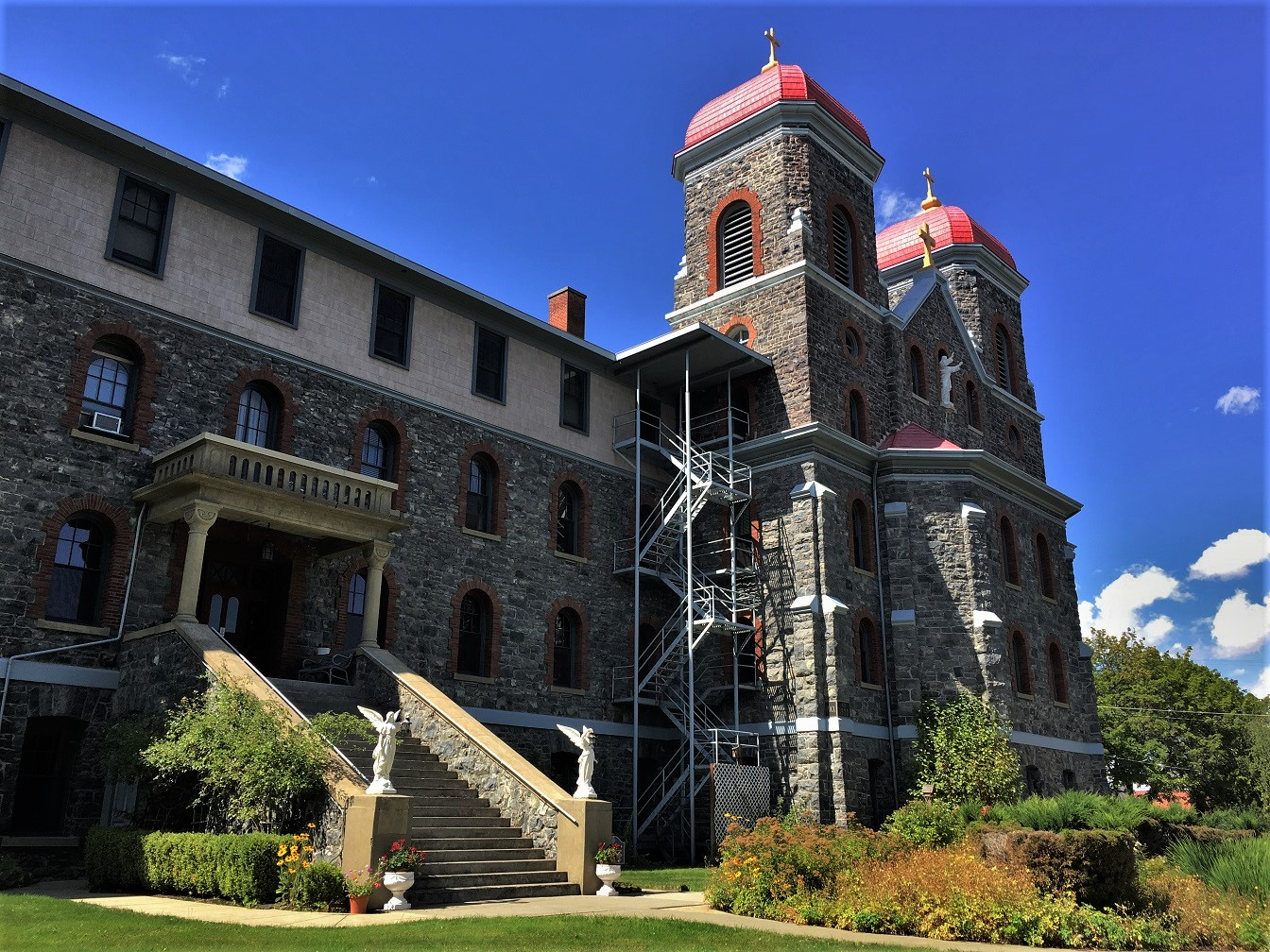

- Location within Idaho Location within the United States
- Location: West of Cottonwood, Idaho
- Coordinates: 46°2′1″N 116°23′25″W
- Area: less than one acre
- Built: 1919
- Architect: Englebert Gier
- Architectural style: Romanesque
- NRHP reference No.: 79000790
- Added to NRHP: June 18, 1979

The Monastery of Saint Gertrude is an American monastery of Benedictine nuns near Cottonwood, Idaho. Founded by three nuns from St. Andrew's Abbey, Sarnen, Switzerland, who immigrated to the United States in 1882, it was designated the motherhouse for the community in 1909. Its main building and chapel were listed on the National Register of Historic Places as St. Gertrude's Convent and Chapel in 1979.

== History ==
The community traces its history to Mother Johanna Zumstein and Sisters Magdalene Suter and Rosalia Ruebli, who left Sarnen on September 26, 1882, eventually reaching Gervais, Oregon. They established convents and schools in Uniontown and Colton, Washington, and staffed schools in Cottonwood and Genesee, Idaho, as well as conducting other missions in eastern Washington state and northern Idaho. In 1909, John Uhlenkott, whose two daughters, Sisters Augustine and Scholastica, had both joined the convent, invited the sisters to relocate to Cottonwood and start a school, donating 100 acres for the purpose on a promontory overlooking the town.

Jakob Engelbert Gier of Mt. Angel, Oregon was commissioned to design the chapel and convent building. A German immigrant, Gier had designed St. Mary's Church in Mount Angel, and may have become known to the nuns during their time in Oregon. Construction began in 1919 and was completed in 1924. Given the labor shortage in the area following World War I, some of the resident nuns helped quarry and transport the stone to the building site.

The community continued to operate schools throughout Idaho over the next half-century, including St. Gertrude's Academy in Cottonwood, which closed in 1970. The former campus is now home to Prairie Junior/Senior High School. The community celebrated its centennial in 2009.

== Architecture ==
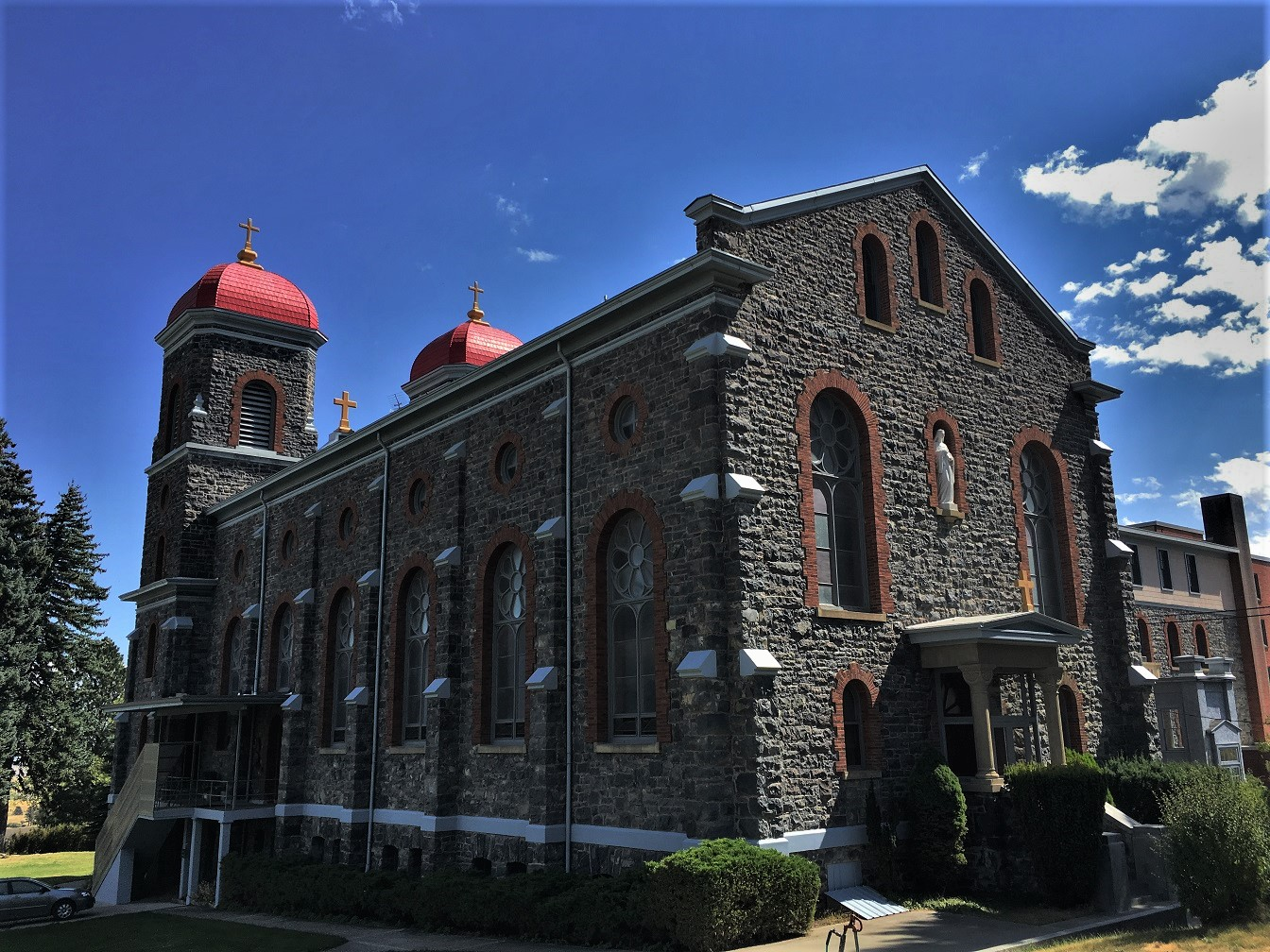
Chapel exterior

The historic structure consists of a 50 by 127 feet (15 m × 39 m) basilican chapel plus a 127 by 164 feet (39 m × 50 m) convent wing. The chapel has two 97 feet (30 m) high corner towers capped by basilica roofs of red shingle tile and gold crosses. The towers house bells honoring the Sacred Heart and saints Joseph, Michael (archangel), and Gabriel. The statue in the niche between the towers depicts the Sacred Heart of Jesus.

The two-foot-thick walls of local blue porphyry are characteristic of the Romanesque Revival style. The structure rests on a three-quarter-story stone foundation, with a grand stairway leading to the balustraded front entry porch, presenting an imposing view. The chapel is divided along its length into seven bays supported by abbreviated buttresses, with a two-story arched window and oval window above in each bay, with surrounds of locally made brick. The statue in the niche above the chapel's rear entry is of Saint Gertrude of Helfta, to whom the nunnery is dedicated.

The chapel's interior is richly decorated with hand-carved pieces. The high altar, a gift from a brother of one of the founding sisters, was built in 1928 in Sigmaringen, Germany, "by a company whose master recently had been awarded the insignia "Pro Papa Et Ecclesta" (for the Pope and Church) for outstanding service to the cause of religious art. This distinction is rarely conferred and this man was, as far as is known, the only one so honored in Germany up to that time." The side shrines were preserved from the original wooden building, purchased from the Philips Company of Dubuque, Iowa, in 1909. The emblems of the Apostles' Creed and other paintings on the chapel's ceilings and walls were painted by Alex Linenberger and Associates of Hays, Kansas, in 1947.
