= Julius Zittel =

German-born American architect (1869–1939)

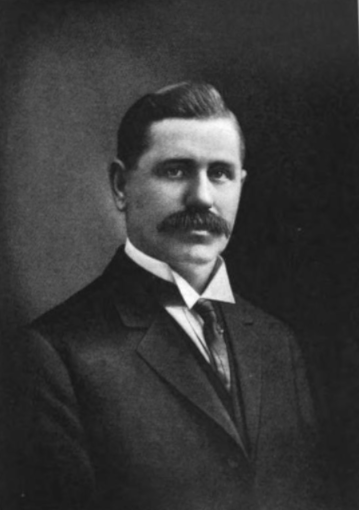
- Zittel in 1912
- Born: Julius Albert Johann Zittel; October 2, 1869; Karlsruhe, Germany
- Died: May 7, 1939 (aged 69); Spokane, Washington, US
- Resting place: Fairmount Memorial Park
- Occupations: Architect, hotelier
- Children: 1

Julius Albert Johann Zittel (October 2, 1869 – May 7, 1939) was a German-born American architect and hotelier known for his work in the state of Washington. He had a long and successful business partnership with fellow German architect Herman Preusse. Zittel designed several buildings listed on the National Register of Historic Places

== Early life ==
Zittel was born on October 2, 1869 in Karlsruhe, Germany, the son of Albert Ernst Zittel and Ida (née Wietinger) Zittel. He immigrated to the United States in either 1882 or 1885, first living in Chicago, Illinois, then moving to Spokane, Washington in 1887, upon turning eighteen.

== Career ==
Zittel worked as a drafter and designer at Herman Preusse's architecture firm from 1887 to 1893. In 1893, they formed the partnership Preuss & Zittel, where Zittel remained until 1910. He subsequently partnered with Archibald G. Rigg from 1912 to c. 1914, then worked solo from 1915 onward. For a time, he was the state architect of Washington. He was also President of Hotel Spokane Ltd. and Spokane's Citizens Savings and Loan Society.

In 1889, Zittel married Alice Shanks (1870–1930). They had one daughter, Eunice I.M. Zittel, born in 1893. He lived in Spokane, dying there on May 7, 1939, aged 69. He was buried at Fairmount Memorial Park.

== List of works ==
Zittel's works include (in Spokane, WA unless otherwise noted):

=== National Reigster of Historic Places ===
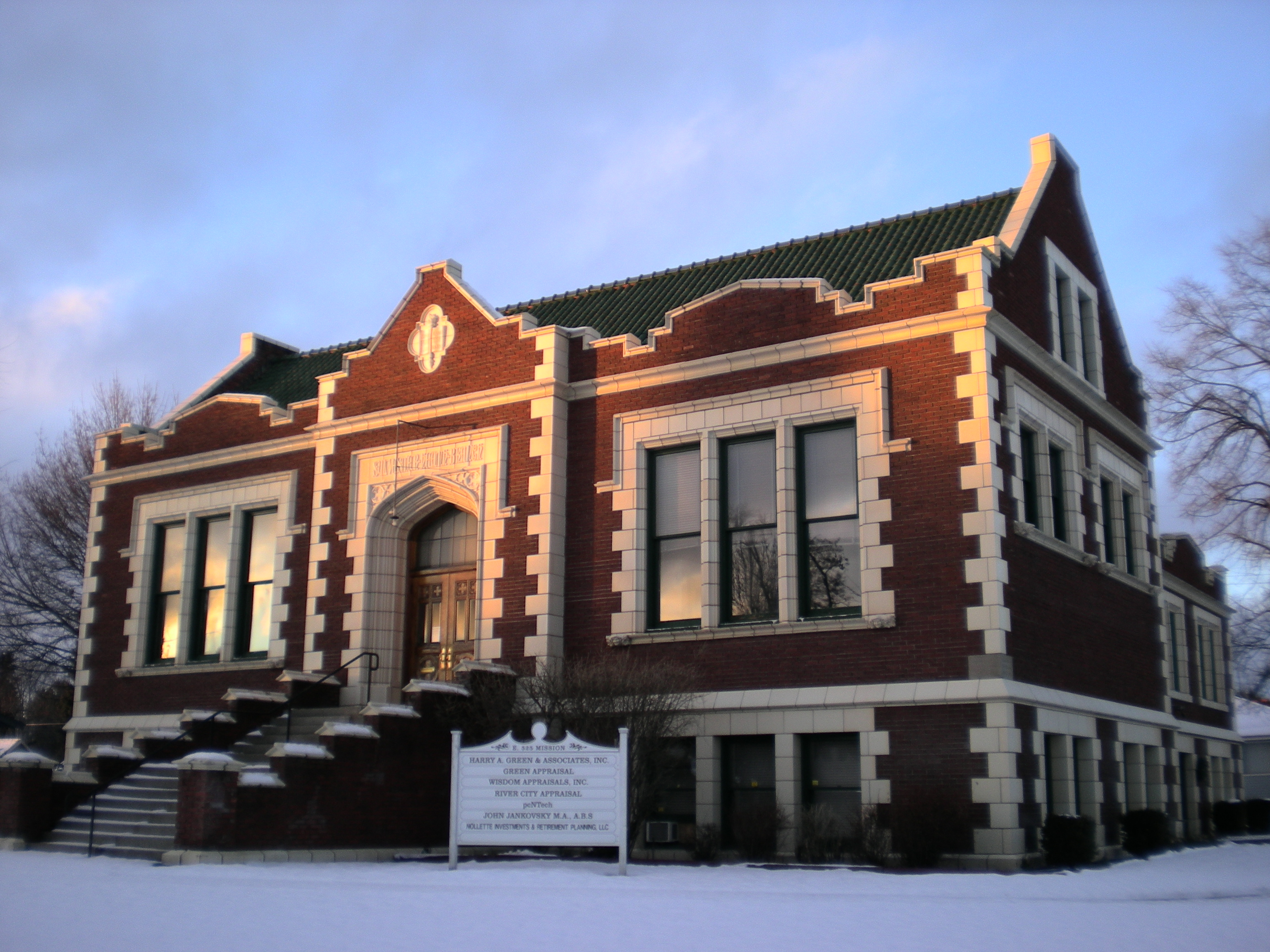
Spokane Public Library - Heath Branch

- Washington School for the Blind (1911), Vancouver, WA
- Spokane City Hall Building (1912)
- Spokane Public Library - Heath Branch (1914)
- Washington State Normal School at Cheney administration building (1915), Cheney, WA
- Mount Saint Michael (1917)
- Benewah County Courthouse (1924), St. Maries, ID

==== Preusse & Zittel ====
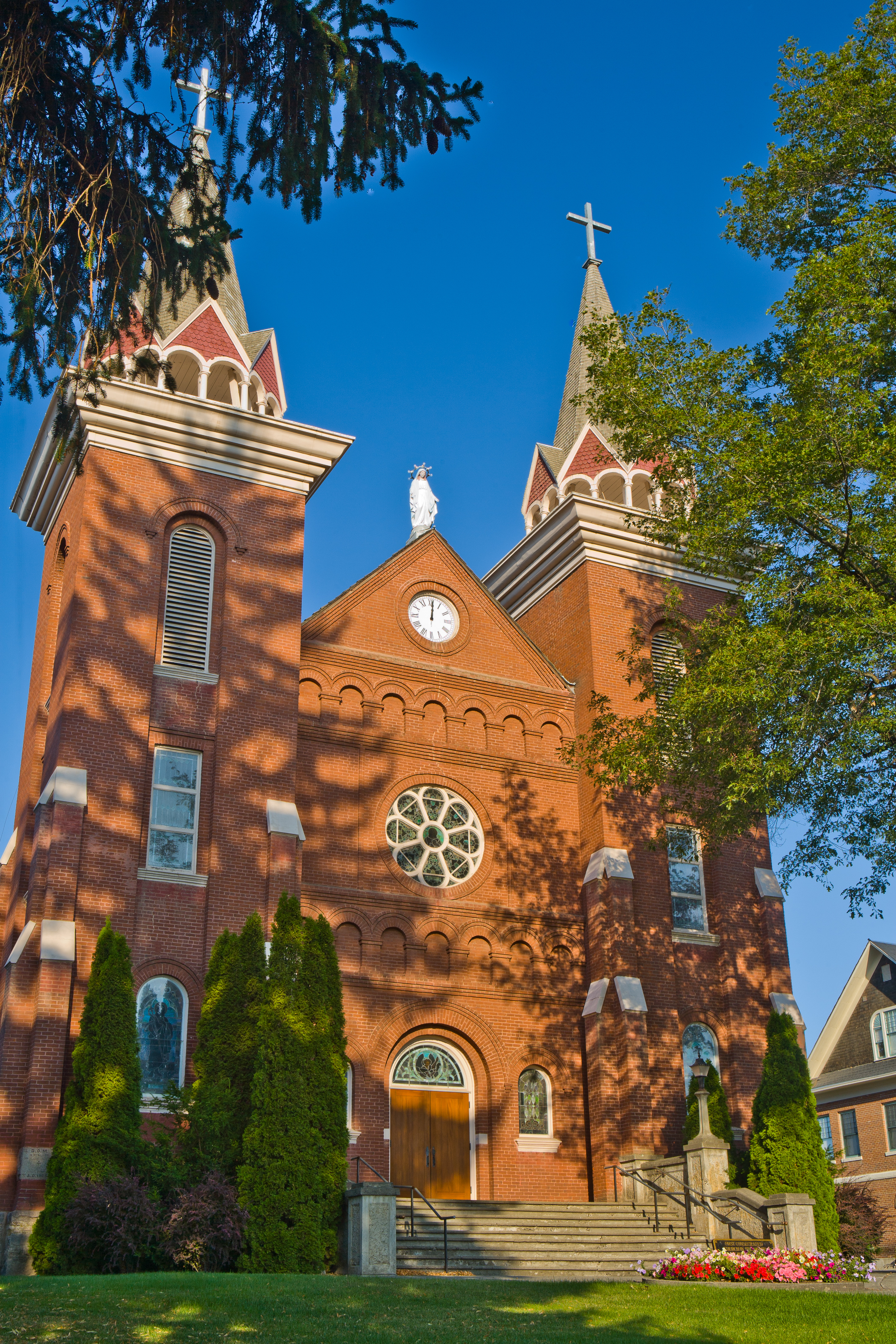
St. Boniface Church, Convent and Rectory

- Edwin H. Hanford House (1892), Oakesdale, WA
- Cathedral of our Lady of Lourdes concept work (1902)
- Spokane Public Library - Main (1905)
- St. Boniface Church, Convent and Rectory (1905), Uniontown, WA
- Ritzville Carnegie Library (1907), Ritzville, WA
- Holy Names Academy Building (1908)
- Bump Block-Bellevue House-Hawthorne Hotel (1909 expansion)

=== Other ===
- Former Spokane Public Library - Main (1905), Preusse & Zittel, part of the Riverside Avenue Historic District and part of a National Register listing of Carnegie libraries in Washington
- early buildings at Gonzaga University including St. Aloysius Church (1909), Preusse & Zittel
- Finch School (1923, 1926, 1930)
- State College of Washington - Troy Hall (1926), Pullman, WA
- Western Washington Hospital for the Insane additional wing (1927), Lakewood, WA
