= Mary Queen of Heaven Roman Catholic Church =

Historic church in Washington, United States

- U.S. National Register of Historic Places
- The church in 2026

- Location within Washington (state)
- Location: N. First and B St., Sprague, Washington
- Coordinates: 47°18′9″N 117°58′30″W
- Area: less than one acre
- Architect: Herman Preusse; Peterson, P.L.
- Architectural style: Gothic Revival
- NRHP reference No.: 90000675
- Added to NRHP: April 26, 1990

Mary Queen of Heaven Roman Catholic Church in Sprague, Washington, is a historic church recognized for its architectural style and its longstanding presence in the community

== Historical significance ==
Mary Queen of Heaven Roman Catholic Church was built in 1902 and is noted for its Gothic Revival architectural style, which was designed by Spokane master architect Herman Preusse.

The church was erected in 1902 and blessed by the Bishop of Nesqually, Edward John O'Dea. Before this current structure, a church was established on the site in 1883 as Mary Queen of Heaven Parish, and a church was erected at that time. The church was added to the National Register of Historic Places on April 26, 1990.

== Architectural Style ==
The Gothic Revival style of architecture is a distinguishing feature of the Mary Queen of Heaven Roman Catholic Church. This style was quite prominent for small-town parishes around the turn of the century.

This church, with its historic and architectural significance, stands as a notable landmark in Sprague, Washington, showcasing a slice of the area's heritage and religious tradition.
