= St. Aloysius Church (Spokane, Washington) =

Catholic Church in Spokane, Washington

Coordinates: 47°40′5.26″N 117°24′18.28″W

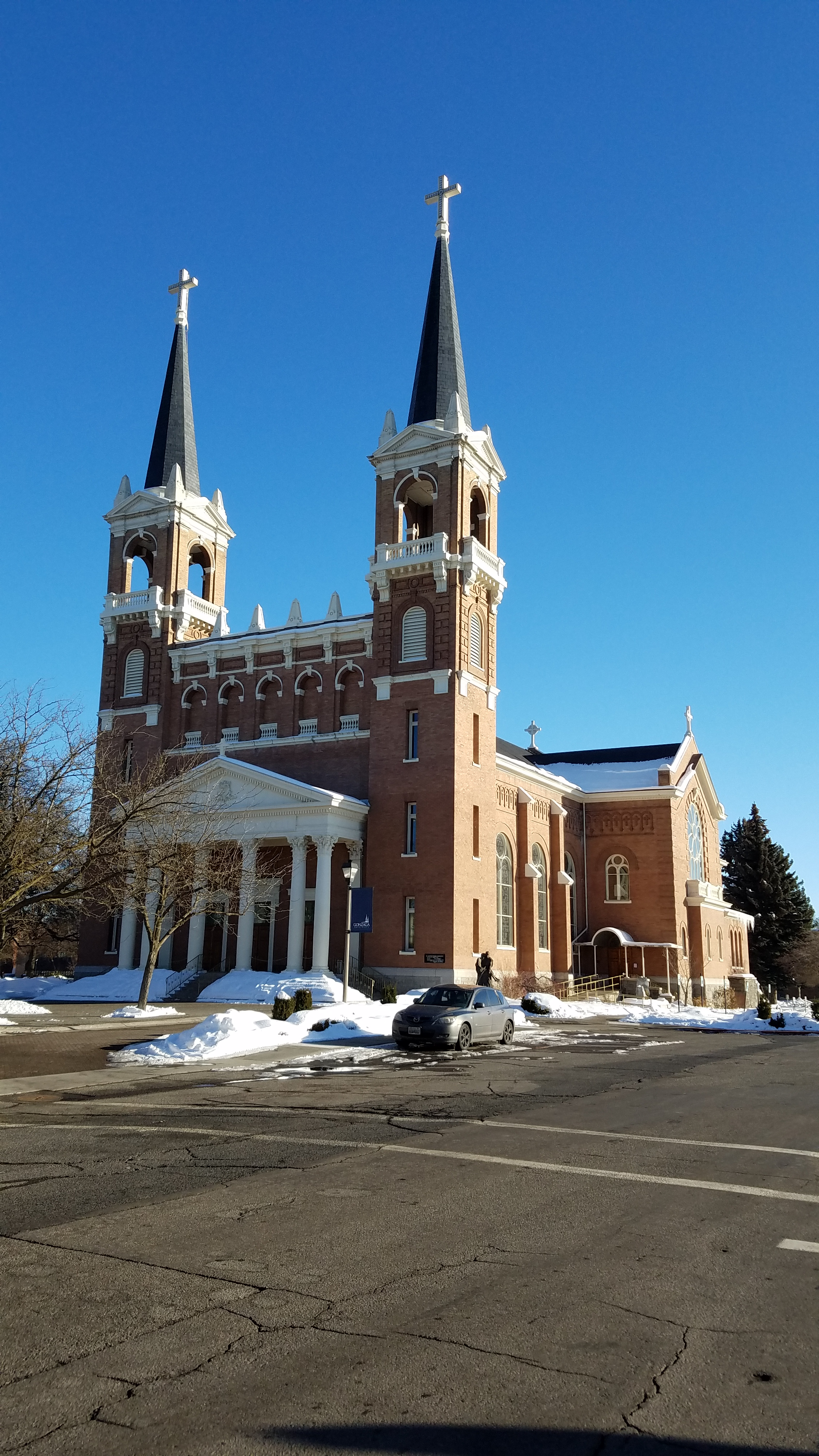
St Aloysius Church, Spokane WA

The St Aloysius Church is a Catholic parish church in Spokane, Washington, United States of America, located on the grounds of Gonzaga University.

== History ==
From 1842 until 1866, Jesuit missionaries came to the Pacific Northwest. They included Father Joseph Cataldo, S.J., who later established Gonzaga University in 1887. The Jesuits' first church was St. Joseph church, a crude wooden building. A plan to build a new church for the institution was put forth in 1904 under the guidance of Father Mackin. The project was put off because of disagreement and rumors that the church would be built without the help of local worshipers. The project was resumed in 1909 under Father Goller's supervision. The St. Joseph church was relocated, and the new church could now be built in its place. The building's estimated cost was $100,000, of which $30,000 had already been raised and half of which had been pledged by contributors.The first published sketch of the building appeared in the Spokesman-Review on October 10, 1909. Gonzaga University and St. Aloysius Church both bear the name of the "Patron of Youth," Saint Aloysius Gonzaga. On October 24, the foundation stone was set. Accompanied by a ceremony attended by a large number of people, an inscription was laid inside the stone that read:

"The First Cornerstone of this Holy Temple, Dedicated to St. Aloysius Gonzaga, was laid and blessed, in the presence of a great concourse of clergy and people, and with due solemnity, by the Rt. Rev. Edward John O'Dea, Bishop of the Diocese of Seattle. To the Greater Glory of God."

The final mass at St. Joseph's was held on October 11, 1911. St. Aloysius was opened on October 12, almost two years after the construction began. Only 200 of the thousands who attended the opening mass at St. Aloysius were allowed entry. All present enjoyed the celebration and a sizable meal as well as speeches from other powerful religious figures of the day.

The parish was formed in 1890. Singer Bing Crosby, who grew up in the neighborhood, was an altar boy at St. Aloysius, and sang in the choir. In October 2013, a memorial service for Gonzaga graduate and House Speaker Tom Foley was held at St. Aloysius.

In August 2021, Father Tom Lamanna of St. Aloysius and Father JK Adams of Gonzaga Prep appeared in the PSA, which was done in partnership with the Washington Department of Health in support of the safety and efficacy of COVID-19 vaccines. In many cases people were claiming religious exemptions. The priests encouraged the public to “take seriously all the data and all of the science” in regards to vaccinations, noting that it was inaccurate to think of science and religion in opposition to each other.

== Architecture ==
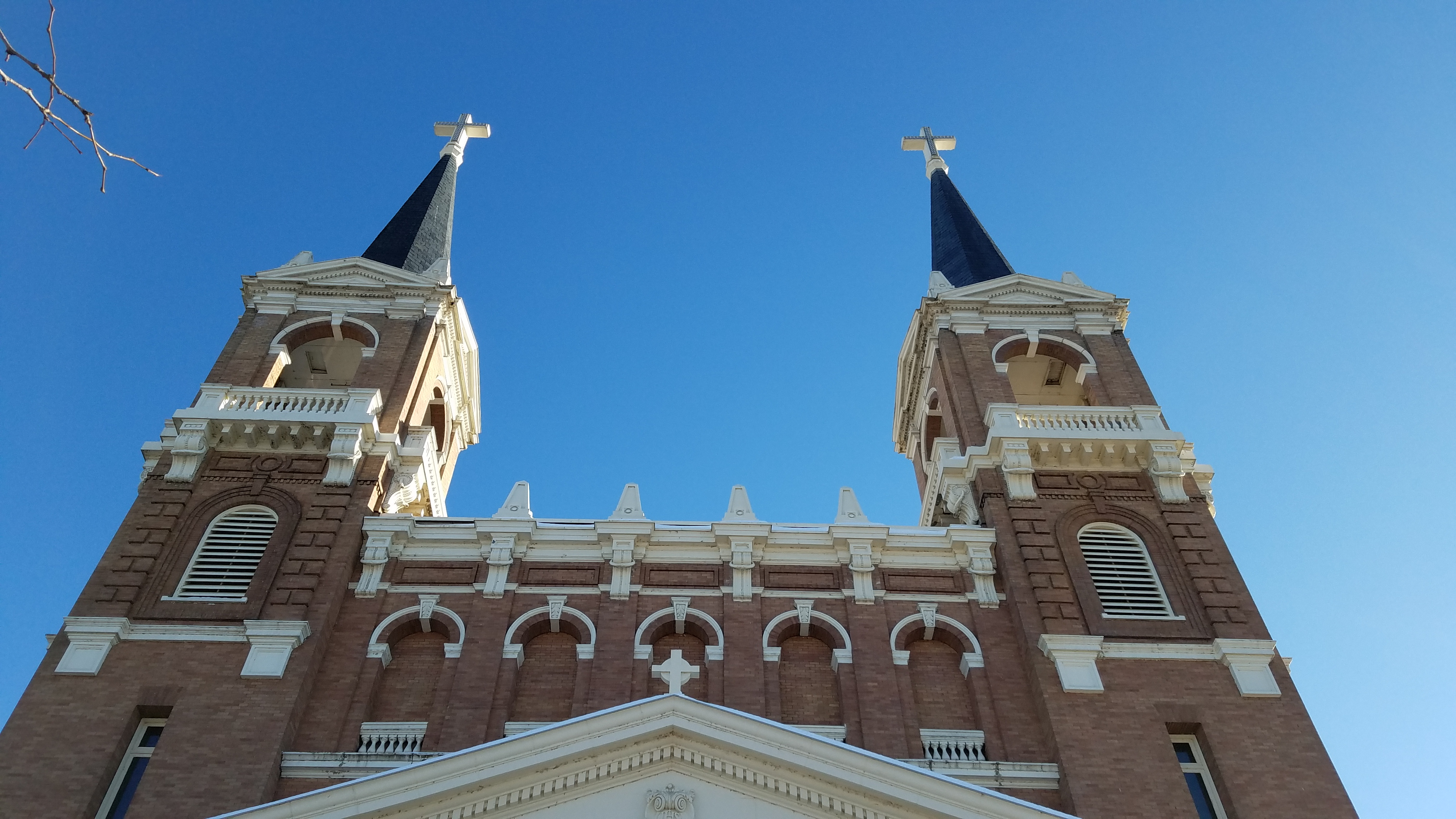
The twin-cross steeples at the entrance of St. Aloysius Church

St. Aloysius Church was designed in Romanesque style by the Spokane firm of Preusse & Zittel with rounded arches. The church seems as if it has vast amounts of space and lets in natural light to illuminate the space.

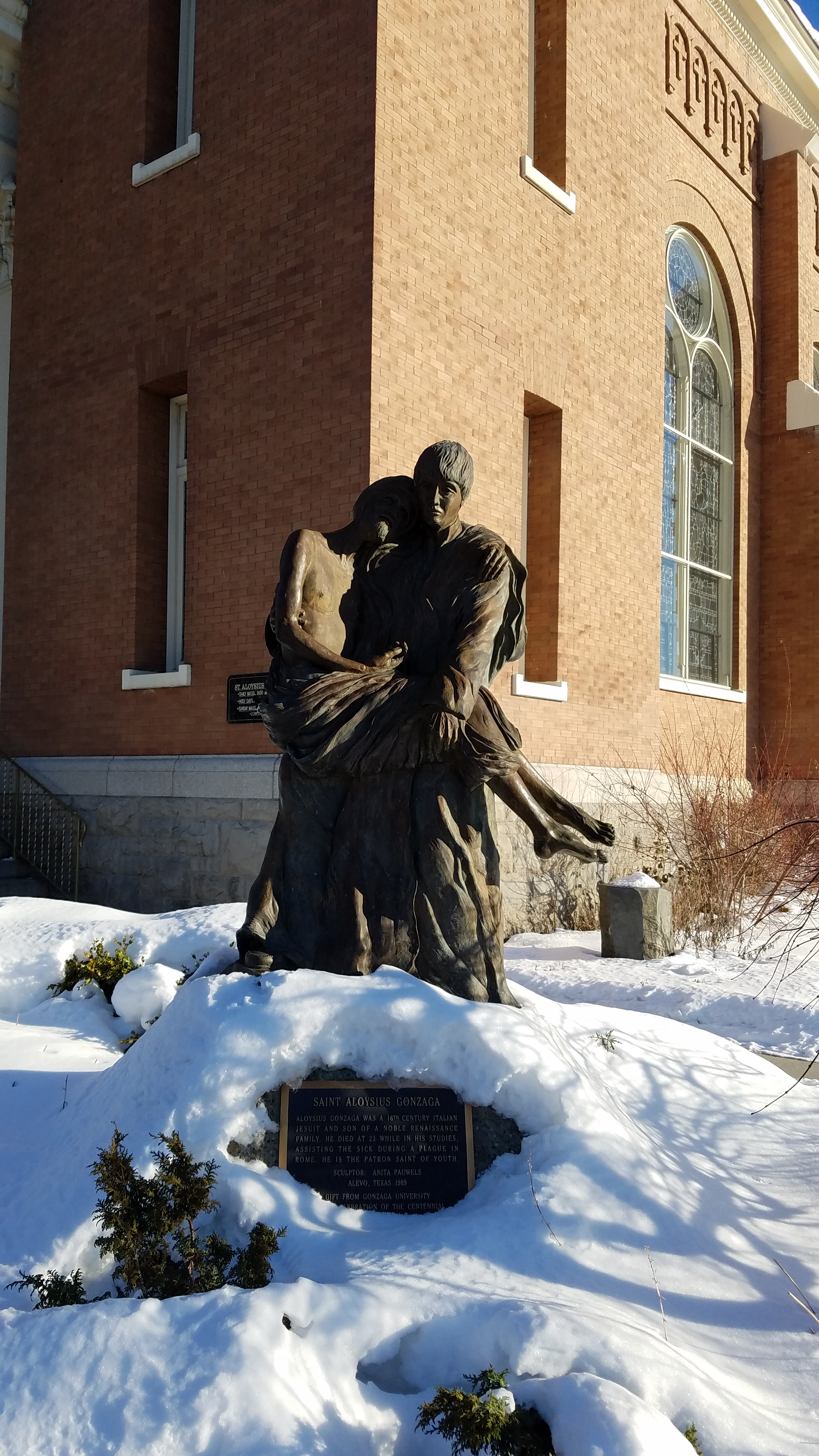
A statue dedicated to St. Aloysius outside the church entrance.

St. Aloysius Church is famous for its twin steeples that can be seen from many locations across the Gonzaga University campus and Spokane. Illuminated by 40 lights, the crosses atop the steeples are meant to be seen at every hour. It has the largest seating capacity among Catholic churches in Spokane. The great bell Catherina is housed in one of them.

Inside, the church features oak woodwork, altars and ambo of matching Italian marble, and a 1928 pipe organ by George Kilgen and Son in a side gallery of the sanctuary. Franz Mayer of Munich was the company in charge of creating the church's Stations of the Cross. The stained-glass windows encircling the church, which feature images of Jesuit saints and St. Aloysius himself, were also designed by Mayers. Four additional windows have been built in recent years.

A ramp makes the basement accessible for a senior lunch on Thursdays.

A bronze statue of St. Aloysius outside the church, created by Anita Pauwels, depicts him carrying a victim of the plague.

== Present day ==
St. Aloysius Parish is part of the Roman Catholic Diocese of Spokane. The parish is staffed by Jesuit priests of the USA West Province of the Society of Jesus. Although they are separate entities, parish and university communities interact. Many of the Jesuits who teach at Gonzaga assist at the parish.

The parish serves a diverse community consisting of university faculty, staff, and students, as well as residents in the surrounding neighborhood. To accommodate students, a Sunday evening liturgy is provided for their convenience. Approximately fifty-five funerals take place each year. Among the three available wedding venues at Gonzaga, namely the University Chapel, St. Michael's Chapel, and St. Aloysius, the latter is the preferred choice for students and alumni.

An annual novena is held each March in honor of St. Francis Xavier. Parishioners, Gonzaga Prep students, and members of the community volunteer to help feed about 500 people at the free St. Al's Thanksgiving Dinner. The church is also the site of symphony and choral concerts, such as Gonzaga University Chorale’s annual Christmas Candlelight Concert.

The parish is a supporter of the "Family Promise" program of Spokane, which assists the homeless, and participates in the Eastern Washington Legislative Conference, an annual interfaith Legislative Conference that focuses on environmental matters. The parish has a sister parish in El Salvador.

St. Aloysius parish consists of an elementary school and a preschool, catering to approximately 500 children.

== Namesake ==
Both Gonzaga University and St. Aloysius Church are namesakes of Saint Aloysius Gonzaga, the “Patron of Youth”. Saint Aloysius Gonzaga lived a rather brief but impactful life, one admired by followers of Catholicism to this day. Aloysius, known at the time as Luigi de Gonzaga, was born on March 9, 1568, to a family of Italian aristocracy. Numerous experiences during his upbringing contributed to his growing aversion towards the extravagant lifestyle that his family embraced. After stumbling upon a book detailing the endeavors of Jesuits, dedicated scholars and ambassadors of the Roman Catholic faith serving in India, he found himself deeply inspired to become a part of their esteemed order as a member of the Society of Jesus. Despite facing persistent opposition from his family, who attempted to dissuade him from his chosen path, he persevered through years of struggle. Ultimately, he made the courageous decision to renounce his inheritance rights, relinquishing material wealth in order to fully dedicate himself to a life of religious commitment.

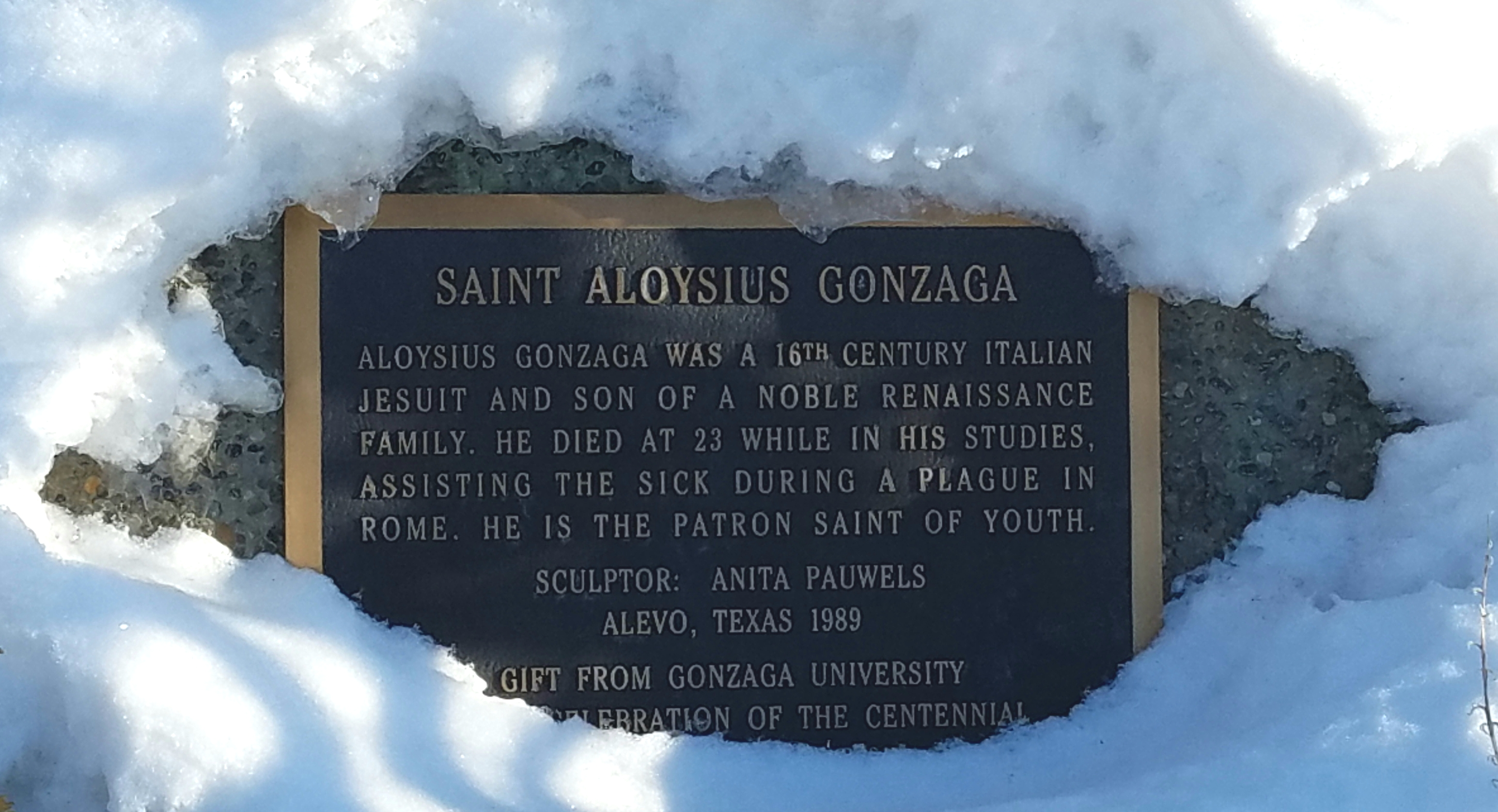
A plaque detailing the life of St. Aloysius is at the foot of his memorial near the church.

Aloysius Gonzaga, the Latin form of St. Aloysius’s Italian birthname, renowned for leading an incredibly pious life. His dedication led him to Rome, where he committed his time to caring for those afflicted by the plague of 1591. Despite the objections of his superiors, he persistently cared for the sick, and as a result, he contracted the plague, ultimately succumbing to the disease at the young age of 23 on June 21, 1591.
