= Herman Preusse =

American architect (1847–1926)

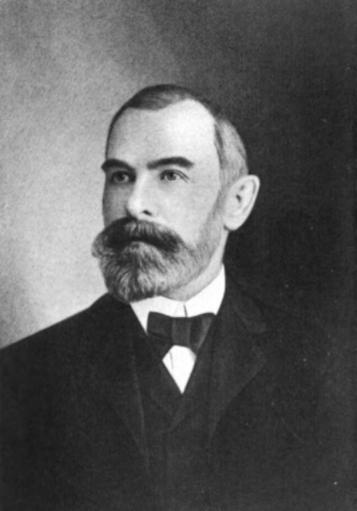
- Preusse in 1912
- Born: 1847; Hannover, Germany
- Died: December 10, 1926 (aged 78–79); Spokane, Washington, US
- Resting place: Fairmount Memorial Park
- Education: College of Applied Science and Art
- Occupation: Architect
- Spouse(s): Rosa Cole (first), Emma Keller Wilke (second)
- Children: 5
- Parent(s): Carl Victor Preusse and Victoria Eckstinoff

Herman Preusse (1847 – December 10, 1926) was a German-born America architect active in Spokane, Washington. He designed several buildings in the National Register of Historic Places and also maintained a long and successful business partnership with fellow German architect Julius Zittel.

== Biography ==
Preusse was born to Carl Victor Preusse and Victoria Eckstinoff in Hannover, Germany in 1847. Preusse's father died when he was three, after which is mother remarried Prussian architect Wilhelm Mehl. Influenced by his step-father, Preusse studied architecture c. 1864 at the College of Applied Science and Art in Holzminden, Lower Saxony.

Preusse came to the United States in 1870, first to Chicago, then to San Bernardino, San Francisco, Sterling, and Kansas City. He was naturalized in 1880 and in 1882, he settled in Spokane Falls.

In 1883, the Northern Pacific Railroad reached Spokane Falls, after which the city hired Preusse as their official architect, where he was tasked with guiding new developments in order to showcase the city as prospering and progressive. Preusse designed numerous buildings while in this position, his clients including Edward Herbert Jamieson, Herman A. Van Valkenburg, and Samuel J. Holland. Many of these buildings were destroyed in 1889 during the Great Spokane Fire, the most notable being Auditorium Theatre, which prior to its destruction contained the largest stage in the United States.

Preusse married Rosa Cole during or before 1885; their wedding was in Kansas City. They had five children together. By 1894, Preusse owned 400 acres of land and four additional 160-acre farms.

Fellow German architect Julius Zittel started as a draughtsman for Preusse in 1887 before becoming partner in 1893. Their partnership lasted until 1910. The two designed several buildings that would later be included in the National Register of Historic Places, most notably the Spokane and Ritzville Carnegie libraries. Preusse also designed Temple Emmanuel, the state of Washington's first synagogue, during this time; it opened in 1892, four days before another synagogue opened in Seattle.

Preusse married his second wife, Emma Keller Wilke, by 1912 and he retired by 1920. He died on December 10, 1926, aged 78 or 79, and was buried in Spokane at Fairmount Memorial Park.

== Selected works ==
Notable Preusse works include (in Spokane, WA unless otherwise noted):

=== National Register of Historic Places ===
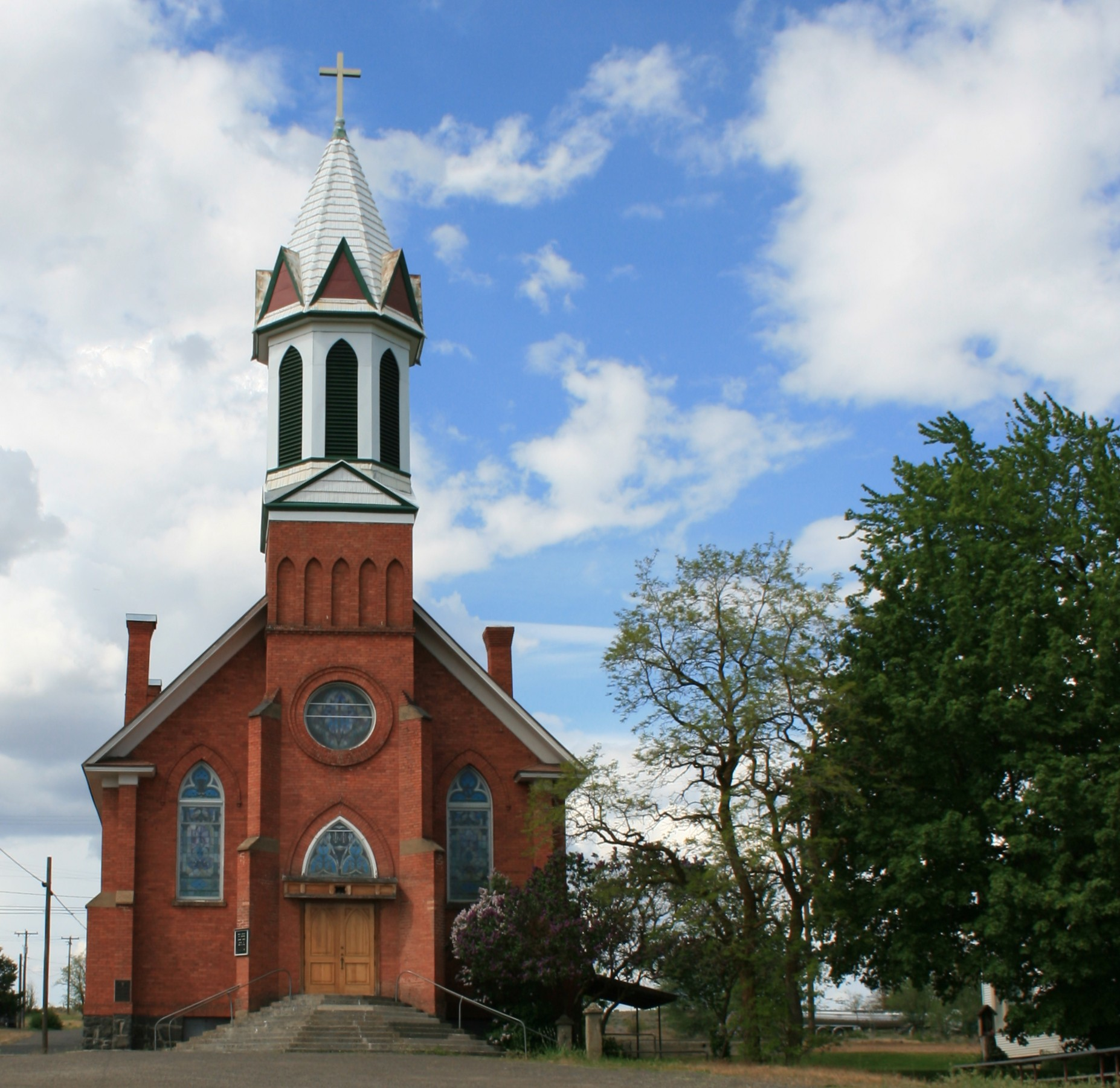
Mary Queen of Heaven Roman Catholic Church

- Peyton Building (1898)
- Mary Queen of Heaven Roman Catholic Church (1902), Sprague, WA

==== Preusse & Zittel ====
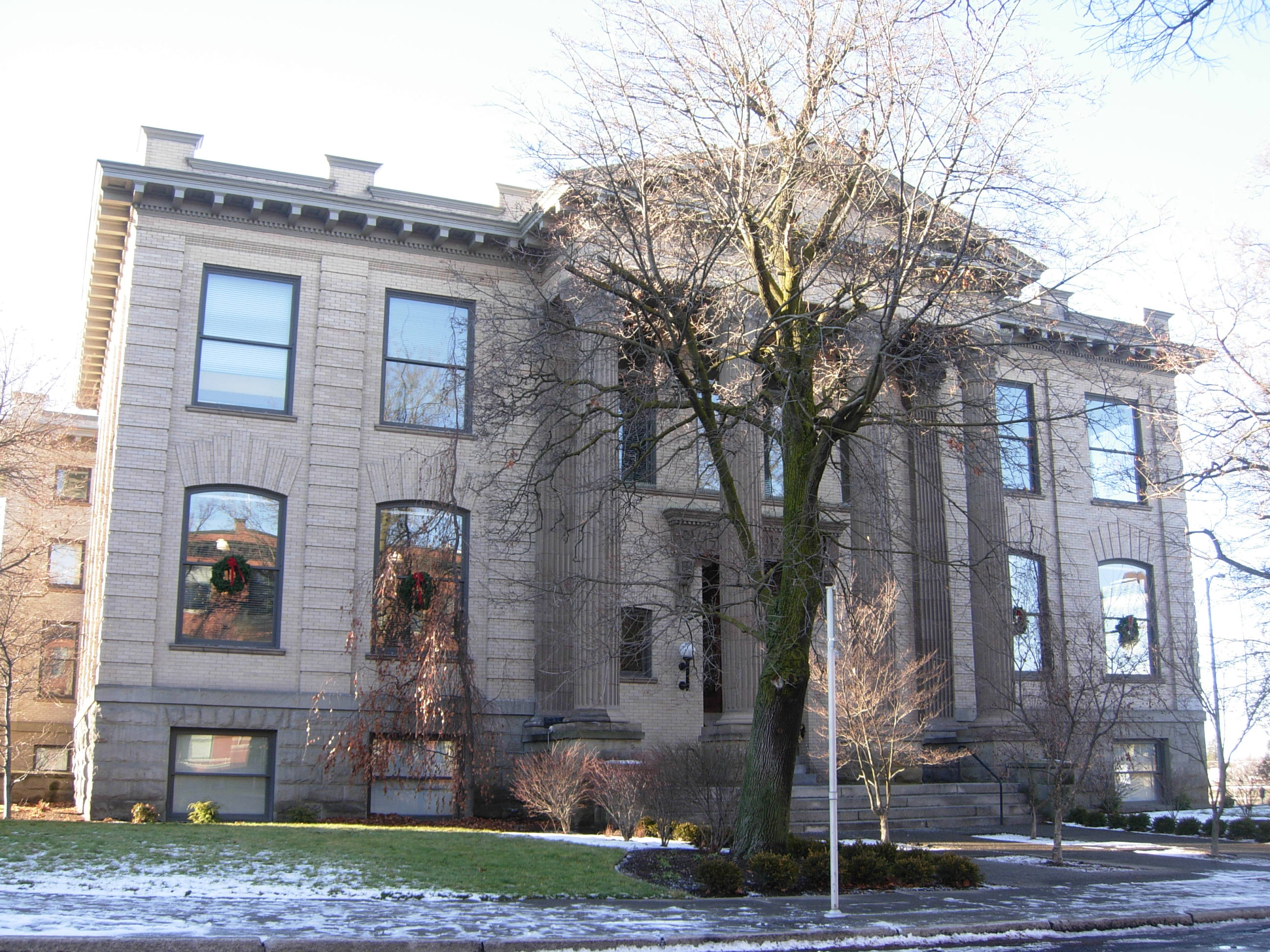
Spokane Public Library - Main

- Edwin H. Hanford House (1892), Oakesdale, WA
- Cathedral of our Lady of Lourdes concept work (1902)
- Holy Names Academy Building (1903 additions)
- Spokane Public Library - Main (1905)
- St. Boniface Church, Convent and Rectory (1905), Uniontown, WA
- Ritzville Carnegie Library (1907), Ritzville, WA
- Bump Block-Bellevue House-Hawthorne Hotel (1909 expansion)

=== Destroyed in the Great Spokane Fire ===
- Frankfurt, Boston, Post Office, and Granite blocks (1880s)
- Blalock building (1880s)
- Ziegler building (1880s)
- Victoria Hotel (1880s)
- Auditorium Theatre (1880s)

=== Other ===
- First Bank of Spokane (1883)
- Bennett Building (1890), with John K. Dow
- Chamber of Commerce/Fernwell Building (1890)
- Edward H. Jamieson Building #2 (1890, demolished 1980)
- Merton Building (1890, demolished 2004)
- Washington State University School of Science buildings (1890-1892), Pullman, WA
- Temple Emmanuel (1892, demolished 1934)
- early buildings at Gonzaga University including St. Aloysius Church (1909) and the main administration building, Preusse & Zittel
- Spokane Public Library - Riverside (1904), Preusse & Zittel
- YMCA Building (1907, demolished 1964)
- the state armory (1908)
