= Grandview/Thorpe, Spokane =

Grandview/Thorpe
- Spokane Neighborhood
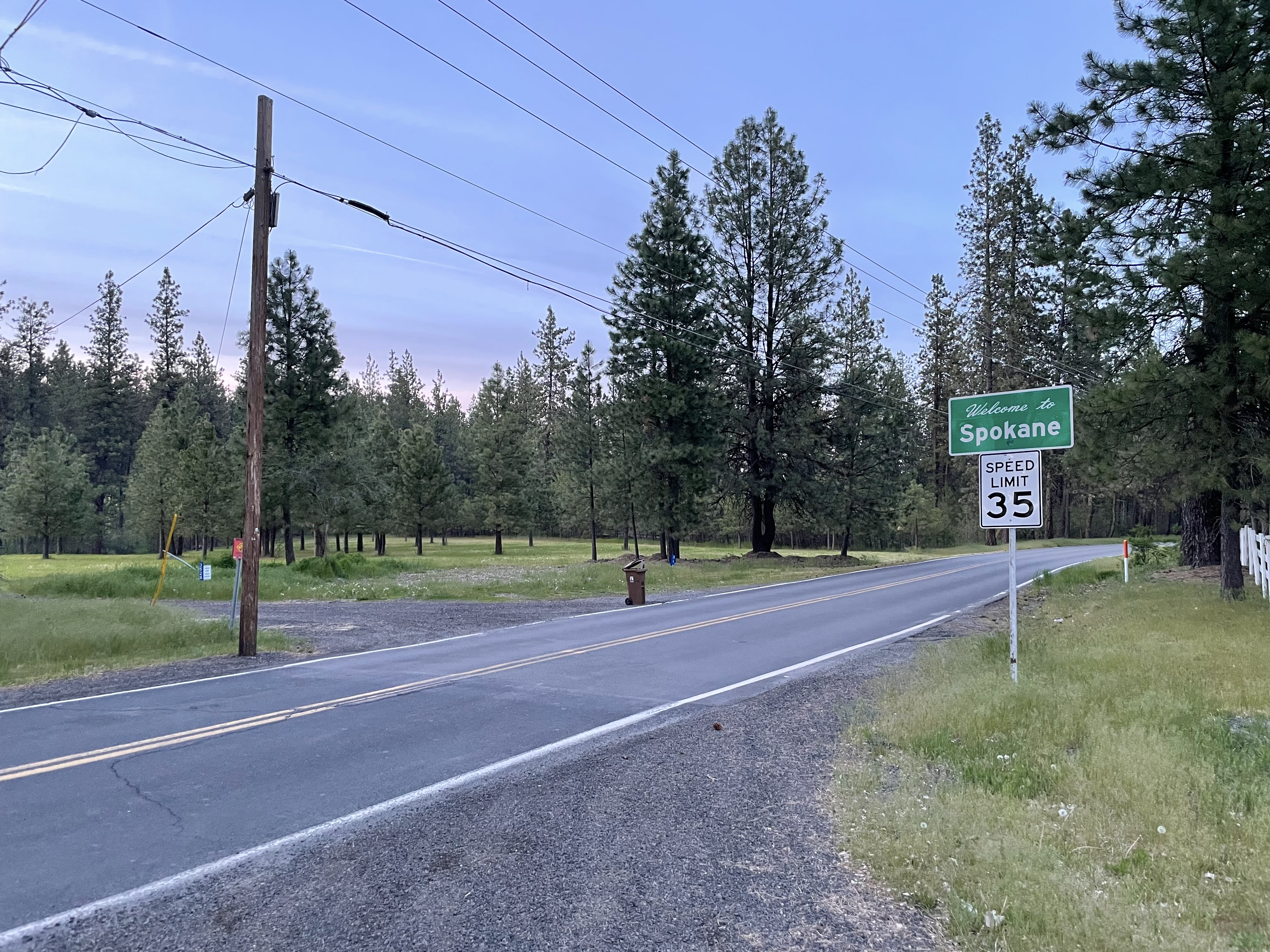
- Welcome to Spokane sign on Thrope Road

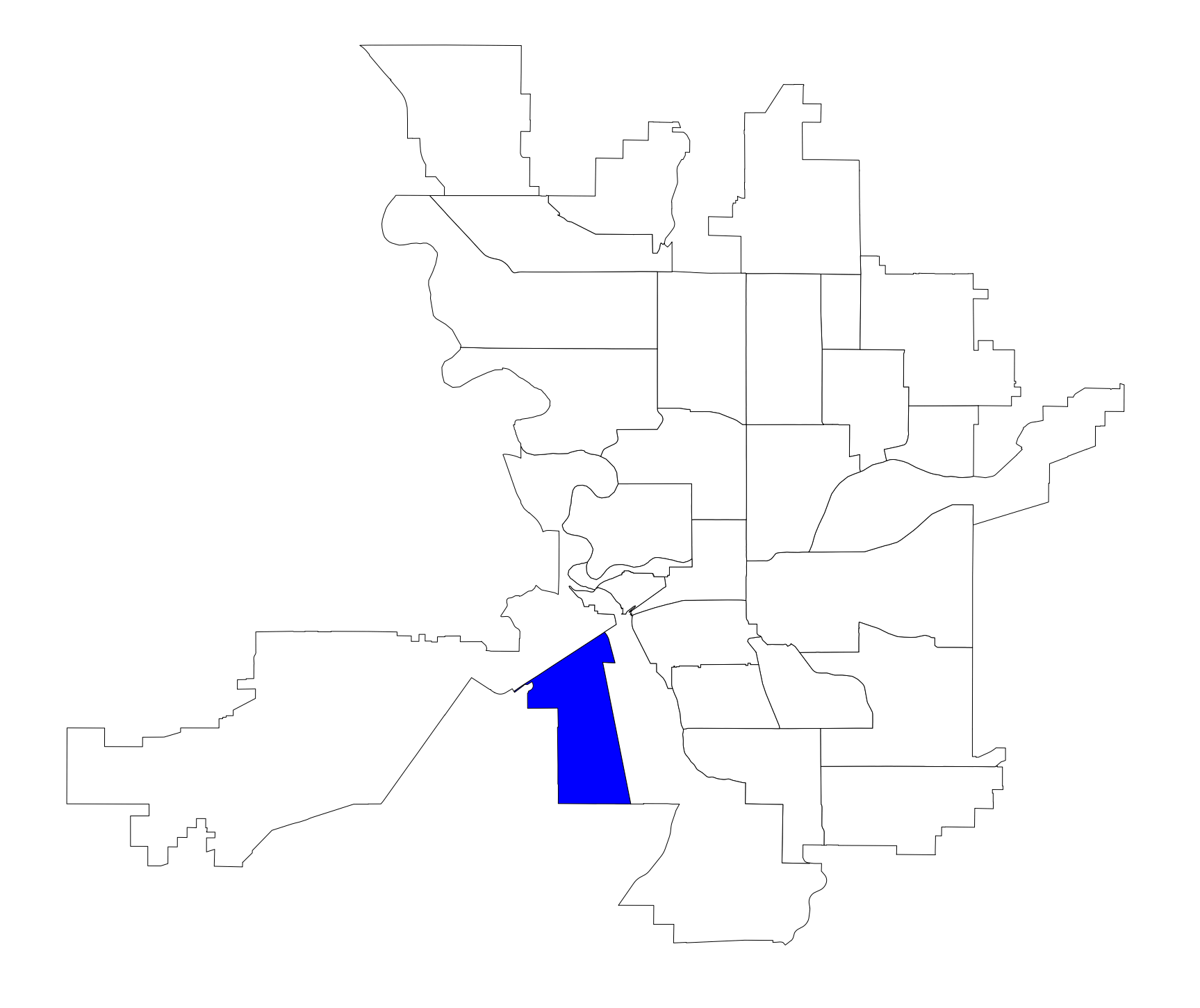
- Location within the city of Spokane
- Coordinates: 47°38′20.1″N 117°27′35.9″W
- Country: United States
- State: Washington
- County: Spokane
- City: Spokane

Population (2017)
  - Total: 1,448

Demographics 2017
  - White: 90.2%
  - Latinx: 4.2%
  - Asian/Native Hawaiian/Pacific Islander: 3%
  - Black: 1.3%
  - American Indian/Alaska Native: 0.8%
- Time zone: UTC-8 (PST)
  - Summer (DST): UTC-7 (PDT)
- ZIP Codes: 99224
- Area code: 509

Grandview/Thorpe is a neighborhood in Spokane, Washington. Located in southwestern Spokane, the neighborhood takes its name from two roads that pass through. Grandview Boulevard, so named because of its location at the top of a ridge from which large swaths of Spokane, the Spokane Valley and surrounding mountains to the north and east such as Mount Spokane, can be seen, is located in the northern part of the neighborhood. Thorpe Road traverses a gully in the central and southern portion of the neighborhood.

The neighborhood's topography is a defining feature, as evidenced by the name Grandview. Interstate 90 descends into the Spokane Valley through the Garden Springs Creek drainage in the north, and Highway 195 travels into the city through the deep valley of Latah Creek to the east. These hills, and the limited access roadways that bound the neighborhood to the north and east, isolate Grandview/Thorpe from the rest of the city. Though the bulk of the neighborhood was annexed into the city by 1907, development was slow and much of Grandview/Thorpe, especially in the south, remains undeveloped. The areas that have been developed are entirely residential, and almost entirely single-family residential.

== Geography ==
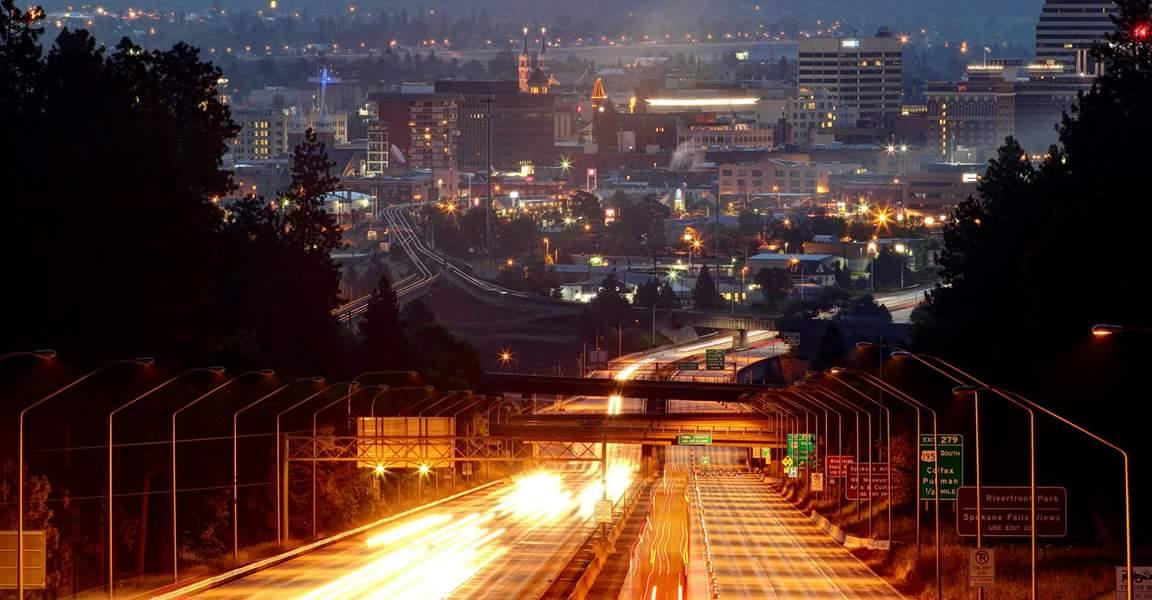
I-90 descending Sunset Hill, with Grandview/Thorpe to the right

Grandview/Thorpe is located in the southwest corner of the city, with the city limits defining the neighborhood's western and southern bounds. Interstate 90 is the border to the north, across which lies the West Hills neighborhood. Interstate 90 descends from the elevation of the relatively flat Columbia Plateau on the west into the lower Spokane Valley below along what is locally known as Sunset Hill. Highway 195 and the BNSF Railway's Northern Transcon tracks define the border on the east, separating Grandview/Thorpe from the Latah/Hangman neighborhood. The interchange where I-90 and Highway 195 meet marks the northeastern corner of the neighborhood. There, the elevation is 1900 feet above sea level. Steep hillsides rise to 2200 feet, with Grandview Boulevard running along their crest. Most of the developed area of Grandview/Thorpe is located in the Grandview area atop the hill. There are smaller residential areas on the relatively flat but small areas at the base of the hill.

Garden Springs Creek briefly passes through the northern corner of the neighborhood, passing under I-90 at Rosamond Avenue. It then passes under Highway 195 near Lindeke Street, shortly before it empties into Latah Creek to the east.

The area south of what would be roughly 25th Avenue, all the way to what would be 44th Avenue and the city limits, is far less developed than the northern Grandview section. There are some farms here, and homes are located on large lots with many tall ponderosa pines.

Grandview/Thorpe straddles the boundary between two ecoregions as defined by the World Wildlife Fund. The lower and easternmost portions of the neighborhood, like almost all of the rest of the city, lie within the Okanagan dry forests ecoregion, which stretches from just south of Spokane northwest through the Okanagan and into the Thompson Plateau of British Columbia. Tall ponderosa pine trees are a remnant of the pre-development nature of the ecoregion. As one heads west from the crest of the hill the Okanagan dry forests transition into the Palouse grasslands.

== History ==
The Spokane people inhabited the area that is now Grandview/Thorpe for centuries before European settlers arrived.

Almost all of the neighborhood was incorporated into the city in two separate annexations. In 1891 the northern half was annexed into the city, and in 1907 the southern half was annexed. By 1900, several residential areas had been laid out, though they remained largely undeveloped and lightly populated. Streetcar and trolley lines connected the neighborhood with the rest of the city in 1904, and served the neighborhood until 1922. What little real estate development occurred in Grandview/Thorpe during those early decades of the 20th century took place along the streetcar lines.

A development around 14th Avenue and D Street was used to house noncommissioned officers of the U.S. Army during World War II, though much of the area was later demolished as Interstate 90 was built through the neighborhood.

In 1963 Grandview and 17th Avenues were paved, and by the 1970s the Grandview area had been connected to the city's sewer system. This helped spur development of the area. Many of the neighborhood's homes are characteristic of the 1970s and built as split-levels. Growth has continued slowly but steadily since the arrival of paved roads and sewers. Grandview Park was developed in the 1990s at 17th Avenue and D Street.

As of the 2020s, continued growth in Grandview/Thorpe is point of contention. Some residents oppose new development on the grounds that it will alter the bucolic nature of the neighborhood, disrupting the area's connection with the natural environment and wildlife. There are also concerns about increased traffic, which are shared not just by residents but the Washington State Department of Transportation as well. In February 2020, the state sent a letter to the city asking for a moratorium on new development citing issues with increased traffic and the neighborhood's lack of roads leading in and out.

== Transportation ==
=== Interstate ===
- - Interstate 90 - to Spokane (east) and Seattle (west)

Interstate 90 connects to Grandview/Thorpe via U.S. 195 in the northeastern corner of the neighborhood, and via the Garden Springs Exit on the western edge of the neighborhood.

=== Highway ===
- - U.S. 195 - to Spokane (north) and Pullman (south)

Highway 195 connects to Grandview/Thorpe via exits at Thorpe Road and 16th Avenue.

=== Surface streets ===
Thorpe Road is the only arterial in the neighborhood, officially designated as a minor arterial by the city. Grandview Avenue is designated as a major collector, which is between an arterial and a local-access street, as is the 16th Avenue/Milton Street/14th Avenue/Lindeke Street which connects to Grandview on the east, and the Garden Springs Road/Rustle Road corridor which connects to Grandview on the west. Those are the only two surface street connections between the Grandview area and the rest of the city of Spokane. All other roads in the neighborhood either do not connect with the city, or connect to it via Highway 195.

There are no dedicated bike lanes in the neighborhood, but Grandview and 16th Avenues are designated as shared roadway bike routes.

From west to east, Rustle Road, Rosamond Avenue and Lindeke Street cross over Interstate 90 into the West Hills neighborhood.

== Education ==
There are no schools in Grandview/Thorpe, nor are there any in the adjacent West Hills or Latah/Hangman neighborhoods. North of Thorpe Road, the neighborhood is part of the Hutton Elementary School district. Hutton is located in the Rockwood neighborhood, and its district immediately surrounding the school is not contiguous with Grandview/Thorpe. South of Thorpe the neighborhood lies in the Wilson Elementary School district. While Wilson is located in the Manito/Cannon Hill neighborhood, which is not contiguous with Grandview/Thorpe, the Wilson district is contiguous with the neighborhood south of Thorpe.

As of 2022, both the Hutton and Wilson districts in Grandview/Thorpe feed into Sacajawea Middle School in the Comstock neighborhood. Starting in 2024, once construction is complete, both districts in Grandview/Thorpe will feed into the new Carla Peperzak Middle School south of the Southgate neighborhood. Though the areas of those districts outside of the neighborhood will continue to feed into Sacajawea.

Grandview/Thorpe is part of the Lewis and Clark High School district.

== Demographics ==
As of 2017 the population of Grandview/Thorpe was 1,448 residents in 653 households. 46.5% of households were rented, compared to 45.3% citywide, and 28.2% of households had children. The median household income was $55,491, compared to $44,768 citywide. 41% of residents had a bachelor's degree or above while 21.3% had only a high school diploma. People aged 19 and under made up 20.5% of the population, compared to 21.9% citywide. Persons aged 65 and above made up 14.3% of the population, compared to 14.5% citywide. Persons of color made up 20.9% of the population, above the 15.1% mark citywide. 92.4% of residents were born in the United States or its territories. Of those not born in the U.S., 20.7% are from Ukraine, 19.5% from India, 12.2% from Canada and 5.2% from Russia.
