= KSKN =

Television station in Spokane, Washington

- Spokane, Washington; Coeur d'Alene, Idaho; United States
- City: Spokane, Washington
- Channels: Digital: 36 (UHF); Virtual: 22
- Branding: KSKN 22 CW

Programming
- Affiliations: 22.1: The CW; for others, see § Subchannels

Ownership
- Owner: Tegna Inc., a subsidiary of Nexstar Media Group; (KSKN Television, Inc.)
- Sister stations: KREM

History
- First air date: December 18, 1983 (Note: The station broadcast a special program on September 30 but did not start full-time programming until December 18.)
- Former channel numbers: Analog: 22 (UHF, 1983–2009)
- Former affiliations: Independent (1983–1987); Dark (1987–1994); HSN (1994–1997); UPN (1997–2002); The WB (secondary 1999–2002, primary 2002–2006)
- Call sign meaning: Spokane

Technical information
- Licensing authority: FCC
- Facility ID: 35606
- ERP: 1,000 kW
- HAAT: 622 m (2,041 ft)
- Transmitter coordinates: 47°35′41″N 117°17′57″W

Links
- Public license information: Public file; LMS

KSKN (channel 22) is a television station in Spokane, Washington, United States, serving as the market's local outlet for The CW. It is owned by the Tegna subsidiary of Nexstar Media Group alongside CBS affiliate KREM (channel 2). The two stations share studios on South Regal Street in the Southgate neighborhood of Spokane; KSKN's transmitter is on Krell Hill to the southeast.

KSKN began broadcasting full programming in December 1983 as an independent station and remained on the air for less than four years, during which two successive owners filed for bankruptcy. It did not return to the air until 1994, airing home shopping programs until KREM took control of its operations in 1997. The station then affiliated with UPN and later The WB before becoming Spokane's CW affiliate in 2006. KSKN airs local morning and 10 p.m. newscasts from the KREM newsroom.

== History ==
=== Early years ===
In 1982, Broadcast Vision Television, a company owned by Lee Schulman, obtained the construction permit for KSKN and began construction on what would be the city's second UHF outlet after KAYU-TV (channel 28). Schulman planned for a news department, even including space for news in the station's offices at E4022 Broadway.

KSKN signed on the air for a preview on September 30, 1983, airing a performance of the play Gypsy from the Spokane Civic Theatre. However, the station did not begin full-time broadcasting as a general-entertainment independent station until December 18. Broadcast Vision Television filed for bankruptcy in April 1985. Judgments from this first bankruptcy case continued to be awarded in federal court to creditors as late as 1988.

I went up to Spokane and did a show, and I asked the two mayoral candidates what the biggest problem was in the town. They said it was the 10 percent unemployment. I knew then it was a big mistake.

— Ellen Adelstein

In September 1985, KSKN was sold to Sun Continental Group over the objection of one of Broadcast Vision Television's creditors. The new owners, former owners of independent station KZAZ in Tucson, Arizona, made improvements to the station schedule and added some paid religious programs. Tragedy struck on March 1, 1986, when Gene Adelstein died at the age of 55 while playing tennis in West Palm Beach, Florida. Ellen, Gene's widow, headed up the operation of the station. However, she had doubted the idea of buying into Spokane from the start. The station's finances began to deteriorate not long after. In February 1987, the station trimmed two and a half hours out of its broadcast day; in March, the station filed for bankruptcy again, and in May, it began airing home shopping programs 10 hours a day. On June 27, 1987, the ailing station went off the air.

The station was sold with the approval of an Arizona bankruptcy court to a group led by Steve Whitehead, the former manager of channel 22 when it operated. Whitehead intended similar programming for KSKN when it returned to the air. Much of KSKN's equipment inventory, repossessed by RCA, was sold to be used by the start-up WWRS-TV in Mayville, Wisconsin. Whitehead announced in 1990 that the station would return as an affiliate of the Star Television Network,

=== Return to air ===
In October 1990, Whitehead filed to sell 80 percent of KSKN to Mel Querio. It returned to the air in late 1994 with primarily Home Shopping Network programming. Mel Querio was the primary owner of the station; he died in 1996 and was succeeded by his wife Judy.

In July 1996, KSKN entered into a local marketing agreement with KREM, which was owned by The Providence Journal Company at the time. The next year, the station joined UPN and began airing a 10 p.m. newscast produced by KREM; at the time, KAYU was not airing a newscast. By 1999, the station was a secondary affiliate of The WB, airing its programming first overnight and then in more viewer-friendly off-pattern hours. The Providence Journal Company was bought by the Belo Corporation in 1997, and after the 1999 legalization of duopolies, Belo purchased KSKN for $5 million in 2001.

The next year, KSKN became an exclusive affiliate of The WB and began airing its shows in pattern, having previously displaced them to other timeslots to air UPN prime time shows; UPN migrated to a new station, KQUP (channel 24). KSKN then affiliated with The CW in September 2006 when The WB and UPN merged, by which time KQUP had dropped UPN programming. (UPN was seen for the remainder of its existence in overnight time periods on KXLY-TV.)

In 2013, Belo was acquired by the Gannett Company, which split into print (Gannett) and broadcasting (Tegna) divisions in 2015.

== Newscasts ==
KSKN airs a two-hour morning newscast from 7 to 9 a.m. on weekdays and a half-hour 10 p.m. newscast seven nights a week for a total of 13 1/2 hours of dedicated newscasts. In addition, it simulcasts KREM's 5–7 a.m., noon, and 4 and 5 p.m. newscasts during the week, a total of 20 hours.

== Technical information ==
=== Subchannels ===
The station's signal is multiplexed:

Subchannels of KSKN
Subchannel	Res.	Short name	Programming
22.1	1080i	KSKN-HD	The CW
22.2	480i	QUEST	Quest
22.3	480i	LAFF	Laff
22.4	480i	365	365BLK
22.5	480i	OPEN	[Blank]
22.6	480i	OPEN	[Blank]
22.7	480i	DEFY	Defy

=== Analog-to-digital conversion ===
KSKN ended regular programming on its analog signal, over UHF channel 22, on June 12, 2009, the official digital television transition date; it was one of three Spokane stations not to switch in February. The station's digital signal remained on its pre-transition UHF channel 36, using virtual channel 22.

=== Translator ===
- Bonners Ferry, ID: K25MP-D
