= Krell =

Krell may refer to:

- Krell (surname)
- Krell Industries, manufacturer of audio systems
- Krell Institute, a corporation located in Ames, Iowa, United States
- Krell Hill, a peak in Washington State, United States
- An extinct extraterrestrial race in the 1956 science fiction film Forbidden Planet
