= Comstock, Spokane =

Neighborhood in Washington, United States

Comstock
- Spokane Neighborhood
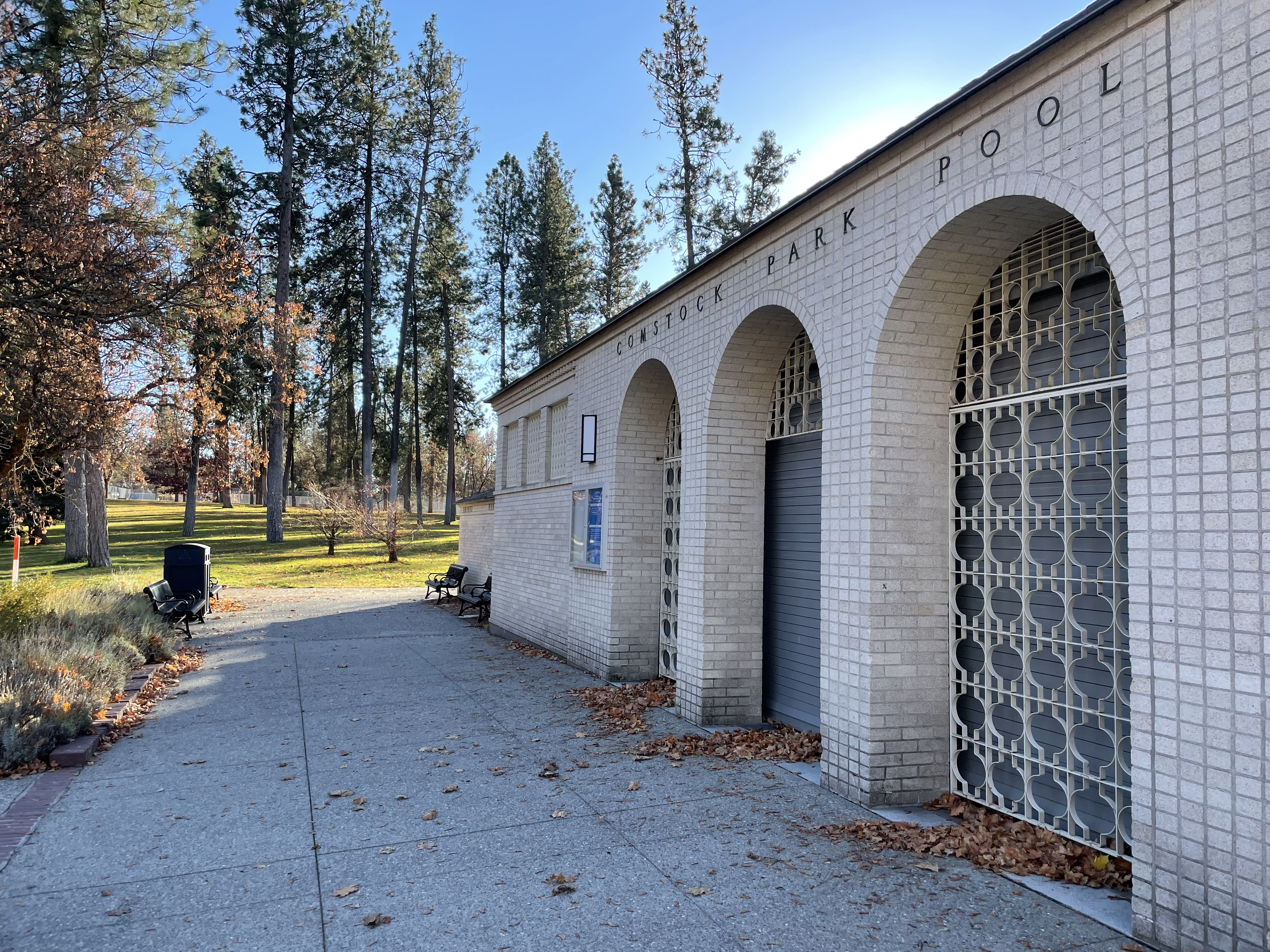
- Comstock Park Pool

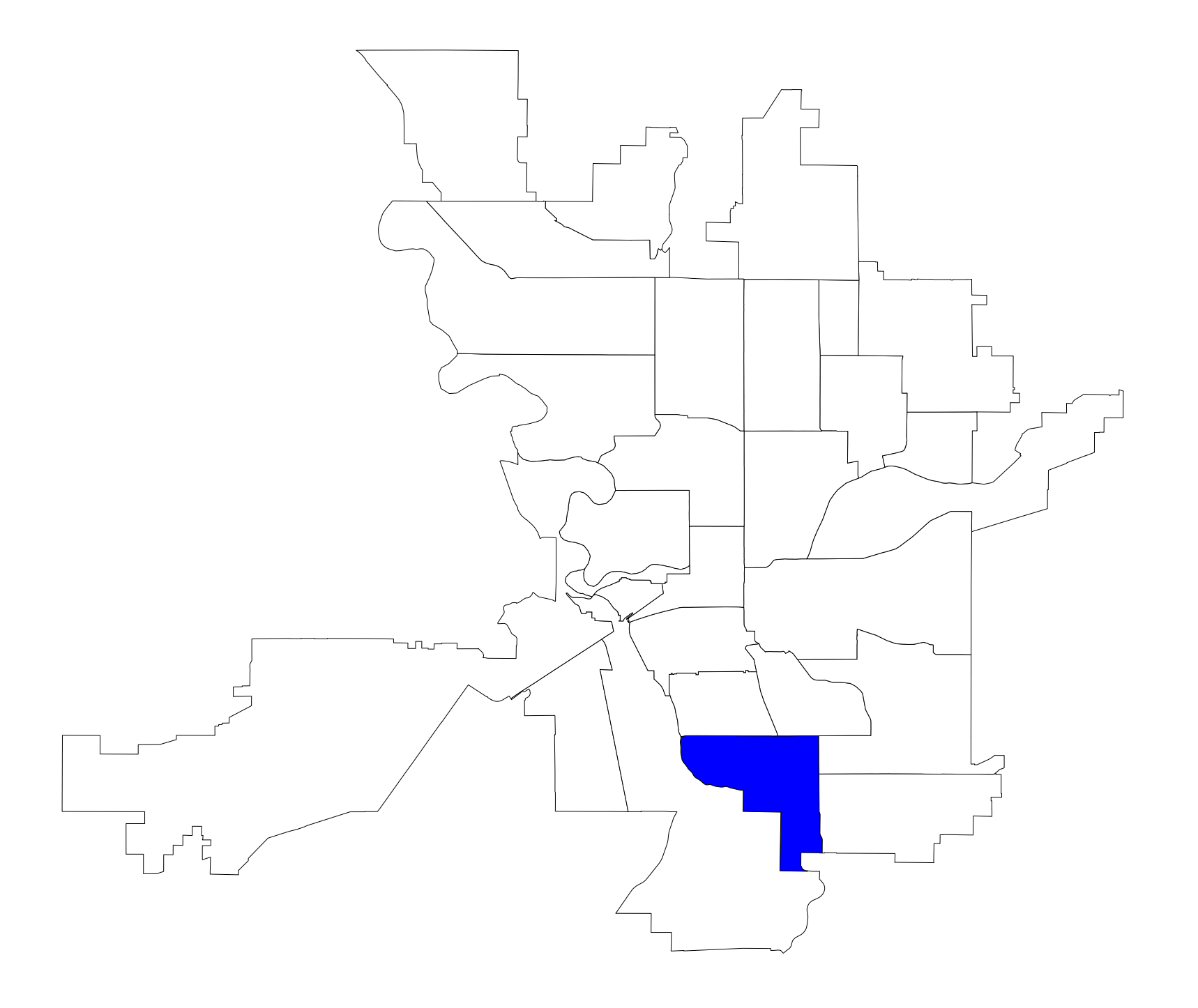
- Location within the city of Spokane
- Coordinates: 47°37′23.4″N 117°24′40.7″W
- Country: United States
- State: Washington
- County: Spokane
- City: Spokane

Population (2017)
  - Total: 6,615
- Time zone: UTC-8 (PST)
  - Summer (DST): UTC-7 (PDT)
- ZIP Codes: 99203, 99223
- Area code: 509

Comstock is a neighborhood in Spokane, Washington. It is located on the south side of the city in a broader area commonly known as the South Hill. The neighborhood is primarily single-family residential, and a mix of homes built during the streetcar era and then built during the post-World War II housing boom. The neighborhood is also home to a few commercial districts, including the regionally important Manito Shopping Center, two schools, the eponymous Comstock Park, sports fields and a golf course.

== History ==
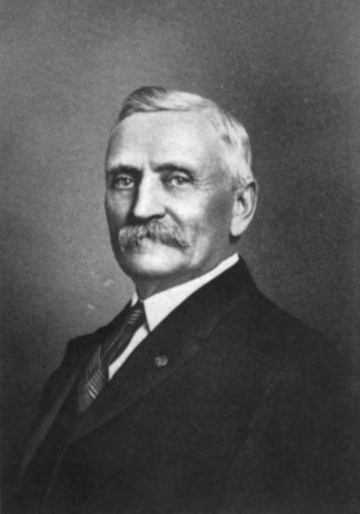
James M. Comstock

The Spokane people inhabited what is now Comstock for centuries prior to the arrival of European settlers in the second half of the 19th century.

In 1888, the Cook's Line of the Montrose Electric Company streetcar system reached to 37th Avenue and Grand Boulevard. Another line traveled along Division Street a few blocks west of Grand and ended at 33rd Avenue. With the streetcar came early settlers into Comstock. Land was platted and homes were built in the areas closest to the streetcar lines, with areas beyond remaining largely undeveloped into the middle of the 20th century. Manito Boulevard was constructed in 1907 as a tree-lined parkway from Manito Park in the north to 35th Avenue in the south, with the hopes of bringing development further into the Comstock neighborhood.

In 1913, as part of the Olmsted Brothers' plan for the city, it was decided to extend Manito Boulevard south to the bluff on the edge of the neighborhood. There, Manito Boulevard would connect with a new parkway, High Drive, which would run west and north along the edge of the bluff through Comstock and beyond. Though the plan did not come to fruition until 1947. It was at that time, during the post-war housing boom, that the southern areas of Comstock, beyond the reach of the now-defunct streetcar lines, began to see full development.

Between the initial arrival of streetcars in the late 19th century and the development of the southern portion of the neighborhood in the mid-20th century, much of the undeveloped land in the southern half of Comstock was developed into parkland. A golf course was built at the original southern terminus of Manito Boulevard in 1907 as part of a plan to lure home builders to the area. By 1922, however, the golf course had moved, though only about a mile to the south where it exists to this day as Manito Golf and Country Club, on the far southern tip of Comstock. The original land used by the golf course was acquired in 1925 by Principal Hart of Lewis and Clark High School, which was located downtown but served the neighborhood. Lewis and Clark's location in the dense city center did not allow it to have sports fields on campus, so the former golf course was converted into Hart Field and to this day is the site of the school's playfields. In 1960, the southern part of Hart Field was developed into Sacajawea Middle School. Comstock Park, with a then state-of-the-art pool, was established in 1938.

Comstock Park was named for James M. Comstock, an early pioneer and businessman who founded The Crescent department store downtown, and later served a term as mayor of Spokane. The land for the park was purchased by Comstock's daughter, Josie Shadle, and donated to the city in 1936. The neighborhood surrounding the park subsequently took Comstock's name as well.

After World War II, the vacant areas on the edges of the neighborhood began to fill in. The land to the west of Comstock Park had been developed by 1958, and the curving streets to the south of the park were filled in in the final decades of the 20th century.

In the late 1950s, the Walther Family, who had owned and operated Manito Grocers out of a two story building at 30th and Grand since 1911, together with developers drafted plans for an expanded shopping center surrounding the busy intersection of 29th and Grand. However, the neighborhood came together to fight the development proposal and it would spend much of the next decade going through court proceedings. Ultimately, the Walthers and their developers won out and the Manito Shopping Center was built in 1969. Construction of the Manito Shopping Center meant the destruction of the former Spokane College building located on the site. Built in 1906, the building housed a college until 1942, and after World War II used as apartment housing.

The neighborhood had been essentially completely filled in by the start of the 20th century Changes have come to the neighborhood in the most recent decades, however. Jefferson Elementary, which had been located at 37th and Grand since the 1908s was moved half a mile west, to 37th and Manito Boulevard on the other side of Hart Field, in 2013. At the same time, Hart Field as a whole underwent renovations. As of 2022, the old Jefferson Elementary on Grand is still standing. While schools around the South Hill have undergone renovations, the old Jefferson building has served as the temporary for those students.

== Geography ==
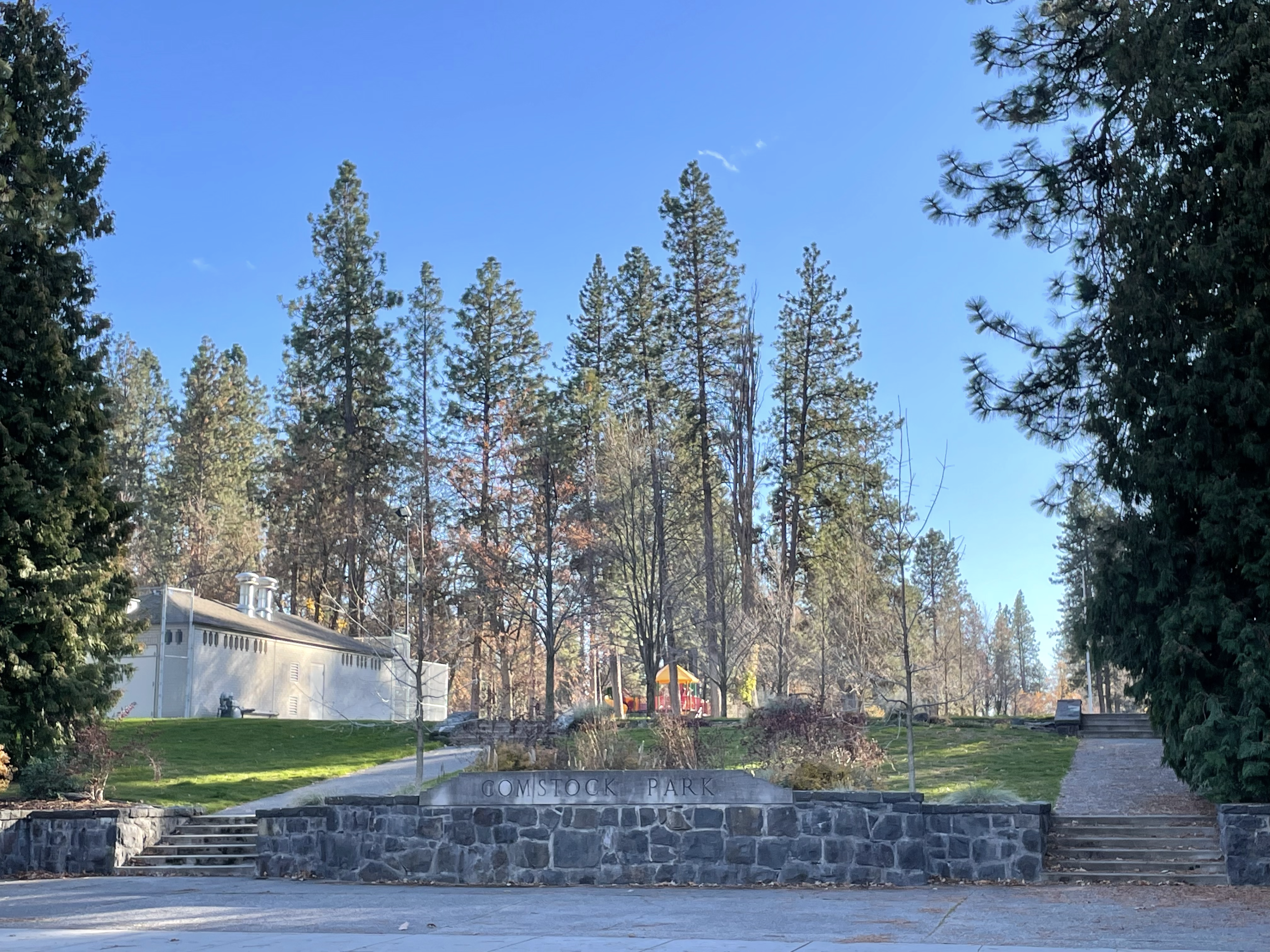
North entrance to Comstock Park

Comstock is located in the South Hill area of Spokane, in the southwestern quadrant of the city. 29th Avenue is the neighborhood's entire northern border, from High Drive in the west to Perry Street in the east across which lies the Southgate neighborhood. High Drive, and the adjoining bluff that rises above Latah Creek separate Comstock from the Latah/Hangman neighborhood below, on the west and southwest. The border diverges from the ridge at High Drive and Manito Boulevard, where it cuts north at a nearly 90 degree angle and then zig-zags to the southeast until it reaches 57th Avenue at Hatch Road. It then drops north to 54th Avenue where it goes over to Perry Street. The eastern border follows Perry from here to 29th Avenue in the north.

The Bluff passes Comstock along High Drive, then past the golf course by Hatch. The Bluff rises over 500 feet (150 m) from its floor at Latah Creek and contains within it High Drive Bluff Park, which features 22 miles (35 km) of scenic trails that are popular for dog walking, hiking, running, and biking.

Though it is located on what is known as the South Hill, and located atop a steep bluff, Comstock itself is mostly flat. The slopes of the South Hill become more noticeable to the north of Comstock, as they descend towards the Spokane Valley. Comstock, however, is at roughly the same elevation as the surrounding Columbia Plateau.

Due in part to the flat terrain, the majority of Comstock conforms to the city's street grid, especially east of Bernard Street. The newer developments between Comstock Park and the curve of the Bluff are a notable exception, taking on a more suburban style with winding roads and cul-de-sacs The grid is broken in a few places, such as by the Hart Field/Sacajawea Middle/Jefferson Elementary complex and the private Manito Golf Club in the far south.

There are numerous publicly-accessible open areas in Comstock. Comstock Park is located in the northwestern corner of the neighborhood, between 29th and 33rd Avenues and Lincoln Drive and Howard Street. Amenities at Comstock Park include an aquatics center, playground, picnic areas, tennis courts, softball diamond and basketball court. Hart Field is the site of Lewis and Clark High School's sports fields, between 33rd and 37th Avenues. Manito Boulevard features a tree-lined parkway that runs from the southern bluff at High Drive south into the Manito/Cannon Hill neighborhood to the north. High Drive also features a parkway that runs along the southern and western bluff.

== Demographics ==
As of 2017, 6,615 people lived in Comstock across 2,890 households. Of those households, 24.6% were rented, compared to 45.3% citywide. The median household income was $68,084, above the citywide median of $44,768. 33.4% of students qualified for free or reduced lunch compared to 54.5% citywide. 21.2% of households had children, and 23.6% of residents were aged 19 or younger. 19.1% were aged 65 or above. Persons of color made up 8.6% of residents, compared to 15.1% citywide. 55.1% of residents had a bachelor's degree or higher while 12.7% had nothing beyond a high school diploma.

94.6% of residents were born in the United States or its territories. Of those born outside of the United States, 17.3% came from Canada, 16.2 from South Korea, 12% from China and 8% from Colombia.

== Education ==
Comstock is served by Spokane Public Schools, and is home to one public elementary and one public middle school, along with the private Southside Christian School. Jefferson Elementary, located in Comstock, serves most of the neighborhood. Wilson Elementary, located in the adjacent Manito/Cannon Hill neighborhood, serves the northwestern corner of the neighborhood west of Comstock Park. The gated communities in the south, west of the Manito Country Club, are served by Mullan Road Elementary on 63rd Avenue outside of the city limits. Both Jefferson and Wilson feed into Sacajawea Middle School, which is located in Comstock. Mullan Road has fed into Sacajawea as well, but starting in 2023 it will begin to feed into the new Peperzak Middle School being constructed, as of 2022, adjacent to Mullan Road. All three public elementary schools serving Comstock feed into Lewis and Clark High School.

== Transportation ==
=== Surface Streets ===
Two streets in Comstock are classified as principal arterials by the city: 29th Avenue and Grand Boulevard. Which makes their intersection in the north-central part of the neighborhood, at Manito Shopping Center, an important intersection for the neighborhood and broader south side of the city. High Drive north of 29th Avenue is also considered a principal arterial, but once it crosses into Comstock it is considered a minor arterial. Other minor arterials include Bernard Street, Hatch Road and 37th Avenue.

Most of the neighborhood follows the street grid, with the exception of the area west of Bernard Street that features winding roads. The street grid east of there is a mix of single and double-length blocks. High Drive is a windy road that runs the length of the neighborhood's western edge and overlooks the Latah Creek valley; there are pull outs for drivers, and park benches for viewing the scenery.

29th Avenue west of Grand Boulevard, High Drive east of Bernard and Hatch south of High Drive have dedicated bike lanes and High Drive west of Bernard has a shared use path for pedestrians and non-motorized vehicles. Arthur Street is a shared roadway bicycle route.

=== Public Transit ===
Comstock is served by the region's public transit provider, the Spokane Transit Authority, with three fixed-route bus lines.

Route	Termini			Service operation and notes	Streets traveled
4; Moran Prairie	Downtown Spokane; STA Plaza	↔	Glenrose; Moran Station Park & Ride	High-frequency route	29th
34; Lincoln/37th Ave	Downtown Spokane; STA Plaza	↔	Lincoln Heights; South Hill Park & Ride	Basic-frequency route	29th, Bernard, 37th
144; South Express	Downtown Spokane; STA Plaza	↔	Glenrose; Moran Station Park & Ride	Express route during peak weekday hours	29th/Division, 31st/Grand, 38th/Grand
