= Kreul =

Kreul is a German surname. Notable people with the surname include:

- Claus Kreul (1944–2024), German football player and manager
- Richard Kreul (1924–2011), American politician

== See also ==
- József Kreul Bugner
- Greul (disambiguation)
- Kreil
- Krell (surname)
