= Gruelle =

Gruelle may refer to:

- Johnny Gruelle (1880–1938), American artist, writer and cartoonist
- Justin Carlyle Gruelle, American painter, illustrator and muralist
- Richard Gruelle (1851–1914), American Impressionist painter, illustrator and author

== See also ==
- Greul (disambiguation)
- Greuel (disambiguation)
- Gruel (disambiguation)
- Carl Maximilian Grüel (1807–1874), German jurist and politician
- Grüll (disambiguation)
- Erin Gruwell (born 1969), American teacher
- Kreul (disambiguation)
- Bernd Kruel (born 1976), German former basketball player
- Krüll (disambiguation)
