= Gruel (disambiguation) =

Gruel is a food consisting of some type of cereal.

Gruel may also refer to:

== People ==
- Andrew Gruel (born 1980), American chef, television personality and politician
- Brigitte Gruel, French actress
- Christoph Gruel or Christoff Gruel (died c. 1596), German lawyer and university professor
- Georg Gruel, Gregorius Gruel or Gregor Gruel (died after 1564), German politician and university professor
- Guillaume Gruel, French squire and writer
- Hela Gruel (1902–1991), German actress and voice actress
- Henri Gruel (1923–2007), French film director
- Léon Gruel (1841–1923), French bookbinder
- Peter Gruel or Petrus Gruwel (fl. 1505–1559), German politician and university professor, relative of Georg Gruel
- Pierre-Paul Gruel (1800–1846), French bookbinder, father of Léon Gruel
- Thibaud Gruel (born 2004), French cyclist

== See also ==
- Gruel (computer worm), 2003
- Greul (disambiguation)
- Greuel (disambiguation)
- Carl Maximilian Grüel (1807–1874), German jurist and politician
- Gruelle (disambiguation)
- Grüll (disambiguation)
- Erin Gruwell (born 1969), American teacher
- Kreul (disambiguation)
- Bernd Kruel (born 1976), German former basketball player
- Krüll (disambiguation)
