= Manito/Cannon Hill, Spokane =

Manito/Cannon Hill
- Neighborhood
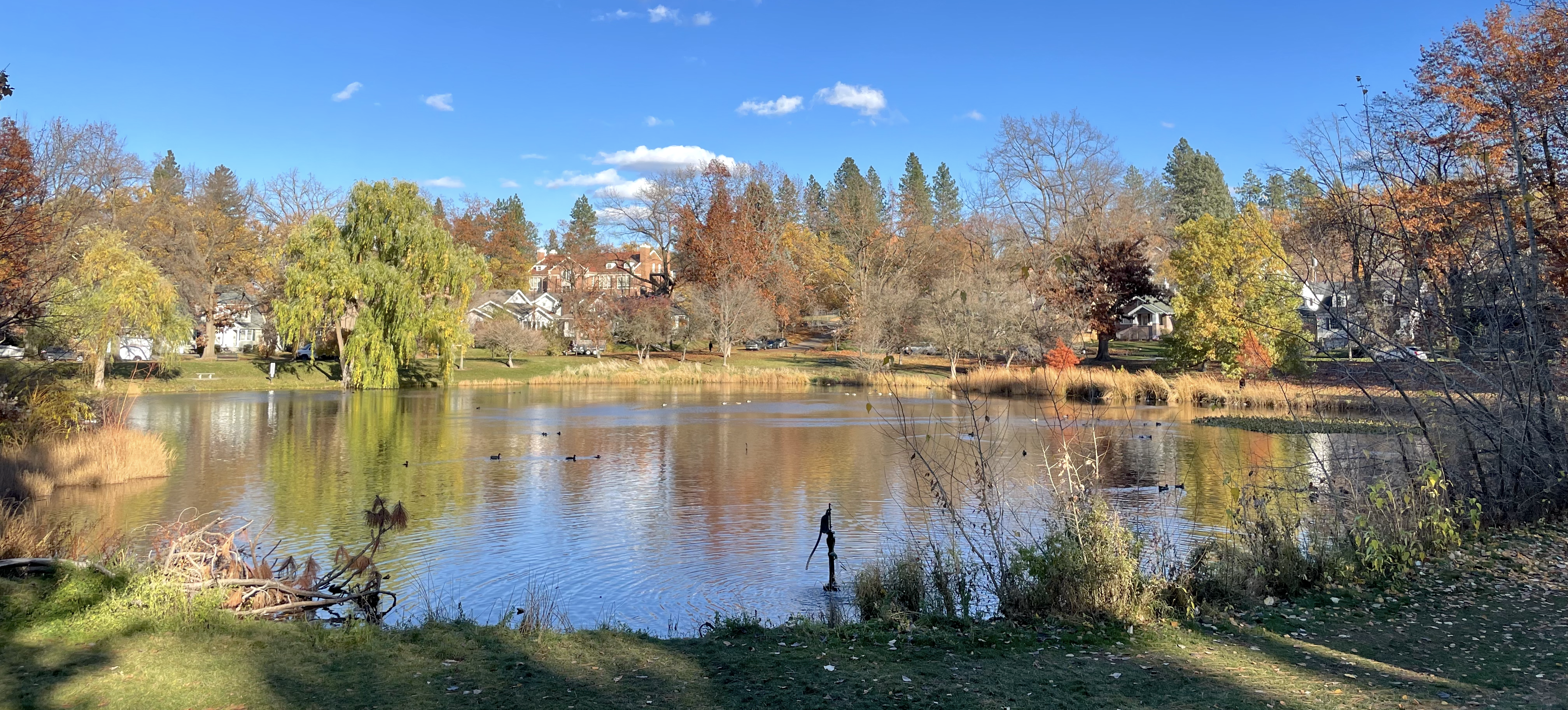
- Pond at Cannon Hill Park

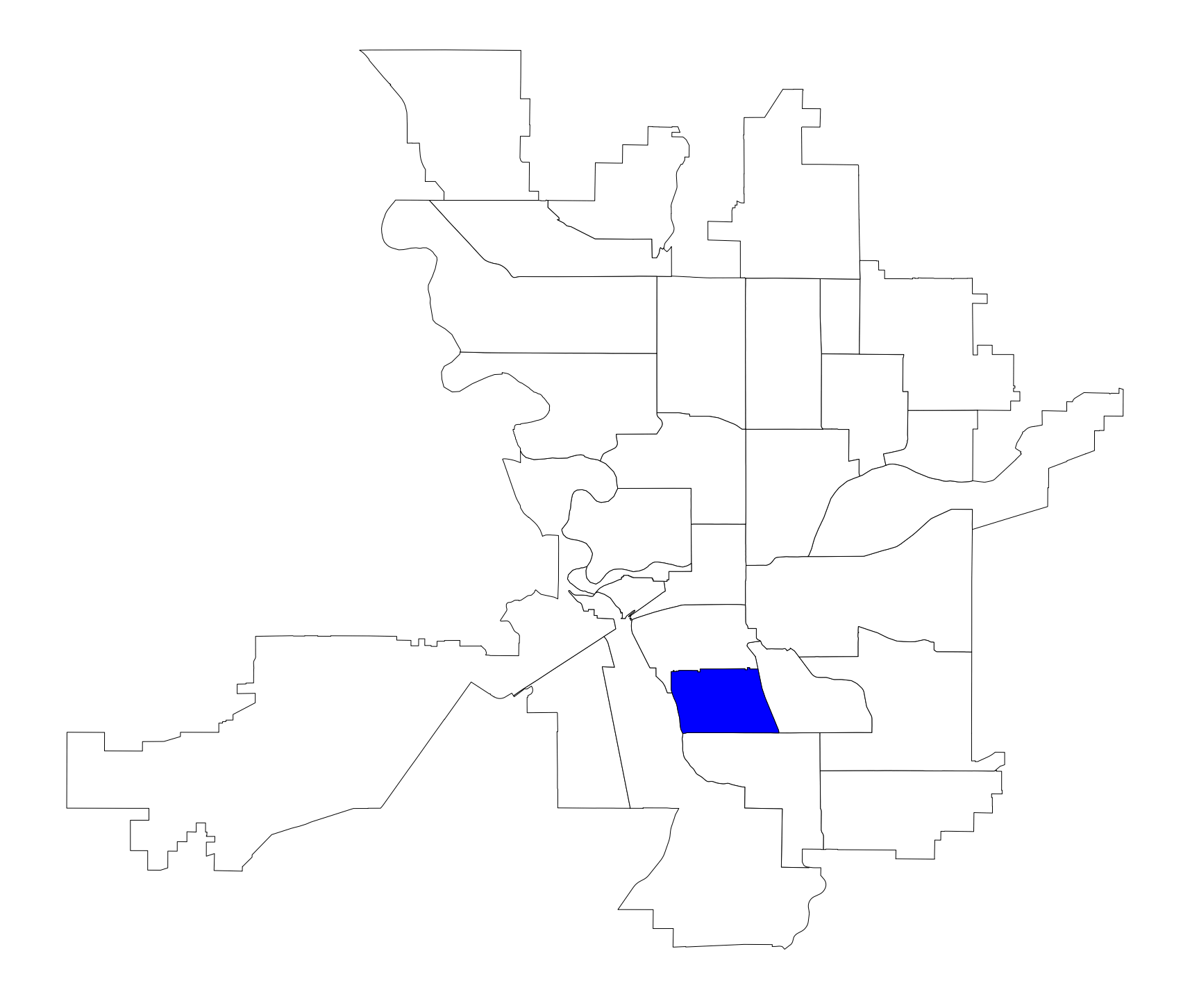
- Location within the city of Spokane
- Coordinates: 47°38′9.61″N 117°24′38.75″W
- Country: United States
- State: Washington
- County: Spokane
- City: Spokane

Population (2017)
  - Total: 4,867

Demographics 2017
  - White: 93.7%
  - Black: 1.0%
  - Hispanic: 3.5%
  - Asian/Native Hawaiian/Pacific Islander: 1.1%
  - Native American: 0.4%
- Time zone: UTC-8 (PST)
  - Summer (DST): UTC-7 (PDT)
- Zip codes: 99203
- Area code: 509

Manito/Cannon Hill is a neighborhood on the South Hill of Spokane, Washington. It is named after the two public parks that dominate its setting: Manito Park and Cannon Hill Park. Manito/Cannon Hill is a predominantly residential neighborhood made up mostly by single-family homes and city park land.

== Geography ==
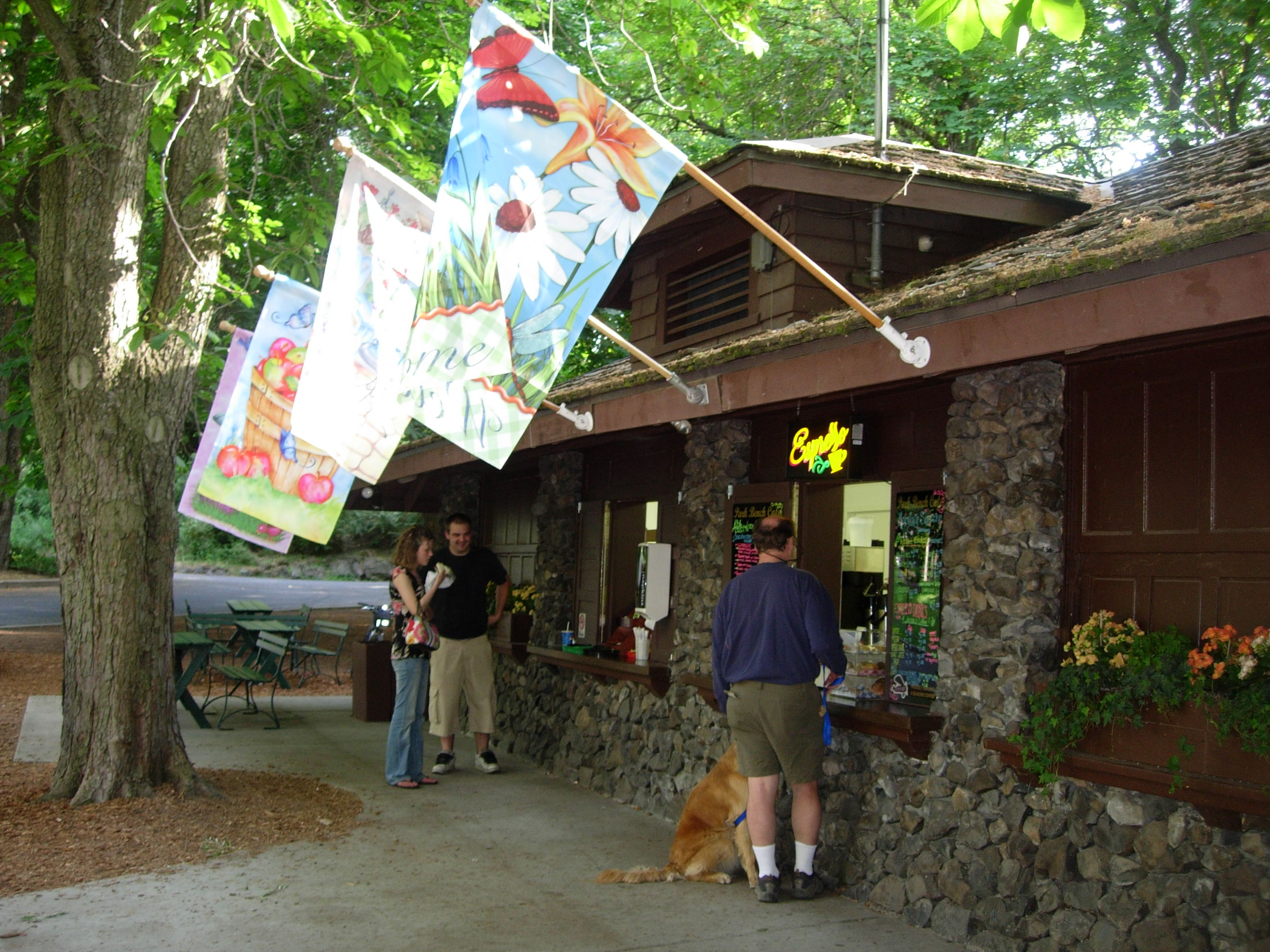
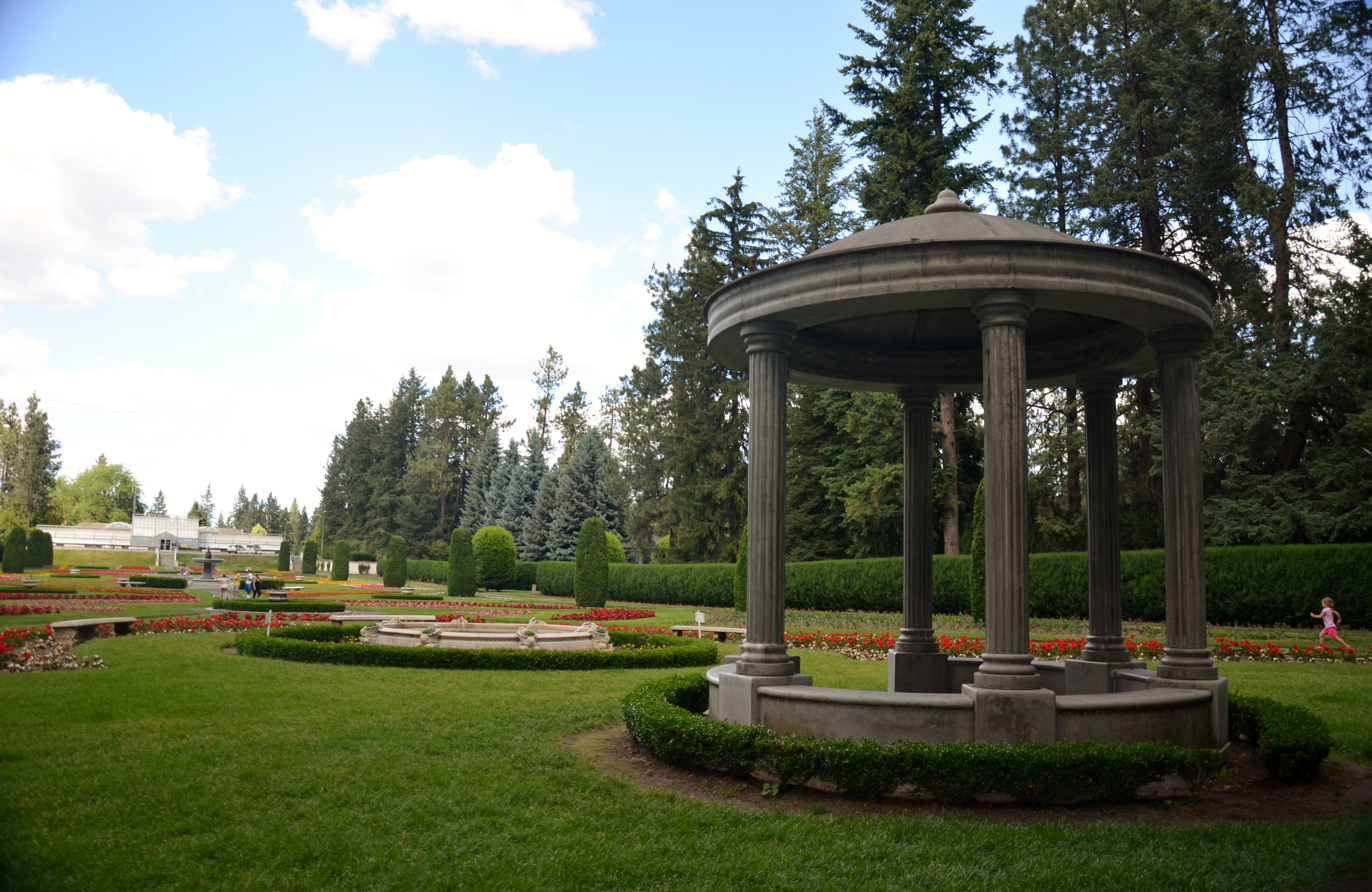
The Manito Park Bench Cafe and Duncan Gardens in Manito Park

Manito/Cannon Hill is located on the South Hill of Spokane, Washington. The neighborhood is bounded on the east by Grand Boulevard from 17th to 29th Avenues, on the south by 29th Avenue from Grand Boulevard to High Drive, on the west along High Drive and Cedar Street from 29th Avenue to 17th, then along 17th Avenue from Cedar Street to Grand Boulevard.

The neighborhood is named after two parks which lie within its bounds: Manito Park and Cannon Hill Park. Manito is one of the flagship parks of the City of Spokane while Cannon Hill is a neighborhood park.

Downtown Spokane is located just over one mile from the northern edge of the neighborhood, down a steep hill into the Valley of the Spokane River, with the hillside neighborhood of Cliff/Cannon between Manito/Cannon Hill and the CBD. Manito Park, and its parkways, dominate the eastern half of the neighborhood. The western half, west of Bernard Street, is mostly residential though Cannon Hill Park and the 21st Avenue Parkway break up the housing on the northern edge of the neighborhood. The High Drive Parkway descends dramatically to Latah Creek on the neighborhood's western edge.

Most of the neighborhood is laid out along the plan of the city's street grid system, though there are exceptions. Like other neighborhoods on the South Hill, local topography interrupts the grid in places. The grid is also interrupted by the neighborhood's parks. Additionally, the eastern and western boundaries of the neighborhood are defined by streets that do not follow the grid system. High Drive follows a ridge rather than the grid and Grand Boulevard is at a slight angle. There are also three parkway boulevards that run through the neighborhood. One starts at Manito Park and follows Manito Boulevard to the south. Another starts at Manito Park on Bernard and runs along 21st Avenue to the High Drive, where it meets the High Drive parkway which follows that road to the south.

== Community ==
The Manito/Cannon Hill neighborhood is served by three public elementary schools: Hutton, Roosevelt and Wilson. Though Wilson is the only school located within the neighborhood. The three schools feed into Sacajawea Middle School, which is located three blocks south of the neighborhood's southern boundary. They then feed into Lewis and Clark High School.

Single family zoned residential areas dominate the neighborhood, though there are a few areas that act as community centers. The 29th and Grand commercial district spills into the neighborhood at the southeast. There is a small commercial area across the street from Wilson Elementary at 25th and Monroe. Another area that diverges from the single-family zoning is located around 18th and Bernard where a church, fire station and Cataldo Catholic School are located.

During the holiday season, the Gaiser Conservatory and gardens at Manito Park put on a light show that draws crowds from around the region.

As is the case in other, neighboring areas of Spokane that have well-developed urban forest settings, wild turkeys live in Manito/Cannon Hill. The turkeys are not native to the region, having been introduced in the early 1900s, and their presence in the neighborhood is a point of contention between those who enjoy the turkeys and those who find them to be a nuisance.

== Demographics ==
As of 2017, the population of Manito/Cannon Hill was 4,867, across 2,008 households. 16.3% of those households were rented. 31.8% of households had children and 24.4% of residents were age 19 or below. Persons of color made up 5.1% compared to 15.1% for the city. Eight percent of the population had only a high school diploma while 66.2% had a bachelor's degree or beyond. The neighborhood is relatively affluent compared to the rest of the city, with a median household income of $79,875, compared to $44,768 for the city. The unemployment rate of 4.2% is below the citywide rate of 6.5%. 16.4% of students qualify for free or reduced lunch, compared to 54.5% in the city as a whole. Rentals account for 16.3% of households, compared to 43.5% citywide.

94% of the residents were born in the United States or its territories. Of residents born outside of the U.S. or its territories, Canadians make up 29.4%, people from the United Kingdom make up 14.6%, people from Poland account for 11.5% and people from Romania account 11.5% as well.

== History ==
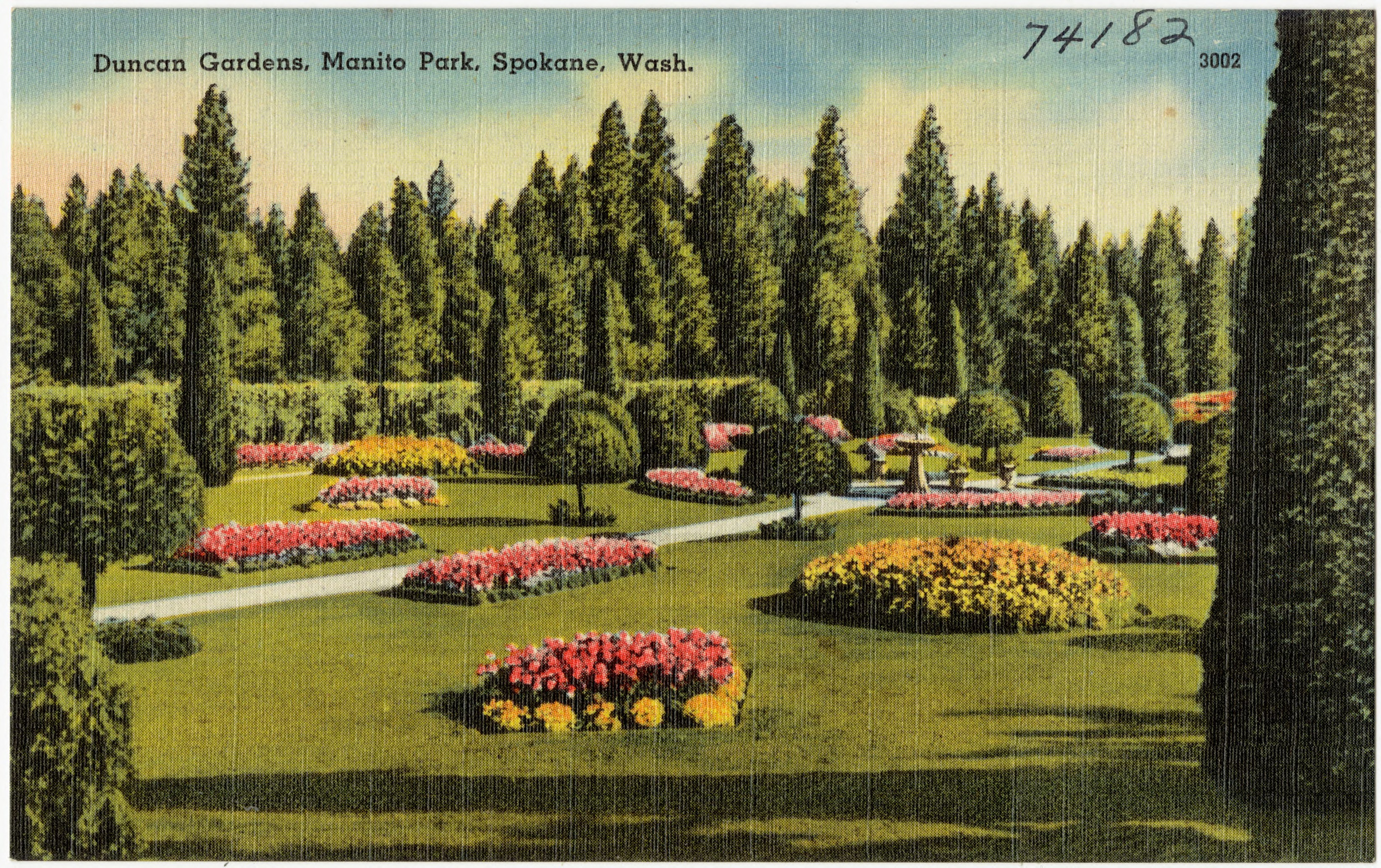
Duncan Gardens postcard from between 1930 and 1945

The area that is now Manito/Cannon Hill was first developed by European settlers in the 1880s surrounding a clay deposit in what is today known as Cannon Hill Park. The clay was used to make sandmold bricks. The small brickyard was founded in 1879 by a bricklayer and the clay from the site was used to build several buildings in Spokane, of which only the Fernwell Block remains today; the company ceased operations in 1910, after which, the land was gifted to the city. In 1888, Francis Cook built a streetcar through the neighborhood to facilitate growth on land that he owned in the area. Cook's streetcar ran up Grand Boulevard to 37th Avenue, about a mile beyond the neighborhood's southern limit. A handful of other streetcar lines drew tracks through the neighborhood, encouraging its development.

Manito Park was dedicated in 1904, though it had been used as a park since 1886. The area was known as "Montrose Park" until 1903, when the "Manito" name was adopted. Cannon Hill was initially known as Adams Park, as the land was owned by John Quincy Adams’ grandson. It was renamed for A. M. Cannon, a local banker and developer.

The Cannon Hill Park area of Manito/Cannon Hill was laid out by the Olmsted Brothers in 1907. They designed Cannon Hill Park, replacing the brick making area with a wading pond that remains there to this day. The brothers also designed the parkway system that runs through the neighborhood for the purpose of "pleasure driving and walking."

Wilson Elementary was opened in 1927 and helped spur development in the neighborhood. The Spokesman Review reported that 12 homes were built directly as a result of the construction of the school.

=== Historic places ===
Manito/Cannon Hill is home to 7 places listed on the National Register of Historic Places.

	Name on the Register	Image	Date listed	Location	Description
1	Harvey and Mary Bauer House	Harvey and Mary Bauer House	December 31, 2013 (#13001031)	420 W. 22nd St. 47°38′05″N 117°25′03″W	
2	Kiesow-Gentsch House	Kiesow-Gentsch House	January 7, 2015 (#14001144)	618 W. 23rd Ave. 47°38′02″N 117°25′17″W	
3	Manito Park and Boulevard	Manito Park and Boulevard	December 15, 2015 (#15000909)	1702 S. Grand Blvd. 47°38′07″N 117°24′30″W	
4	William O. and Stella M. Seligman House	William O. and Stella M. Seligman House	December 16, 2014 (#14001054)	2203 S. Manito Blvd. 47°38′03″N 117°24′27″W	
5	Frank and Maude Tuell House	Frank and Maude Tuell House	August 9, 2006 (#06000702)	416 W. 22nd Ave. 47°38′12″N 117°25′03″W	
6	William and Ella Warner House	William and Ella Warner House	December 23, 2019 (#100004788)	2627 South Manito Blvd. 47°37′48″N 117°24′26″W	
7	James and Corinne Williams House	James and Corinne Williams House	December 23, 2003 (#03001344)	1225 W. 19th Ave. 47°38′16″N 117°25′44″W	Built in 1911.

== Education ==
Manito/Cannon Hill is served by Spokane Public Schools. Wilson Elementary is located within the neighborhood and serves the southwestern portion of the neighborhood. Roosevelt Elementary, located two blocks north of Manito/Cannon Hill in the adjacent Cliff/Cannon neighborhood, serves the central and northern areas of Manito/Cannon Hill. Hutton Elementary, located in the adjacent Rockwood neighborhood, serves the southeastern section of Manito/Cannon Hill. All three feed into Sacajawea Middle School in the adjacent Comstock neighborhood, before feeding into Lewis and Clark High School in Cliff/Cannon.

== Transportation ==
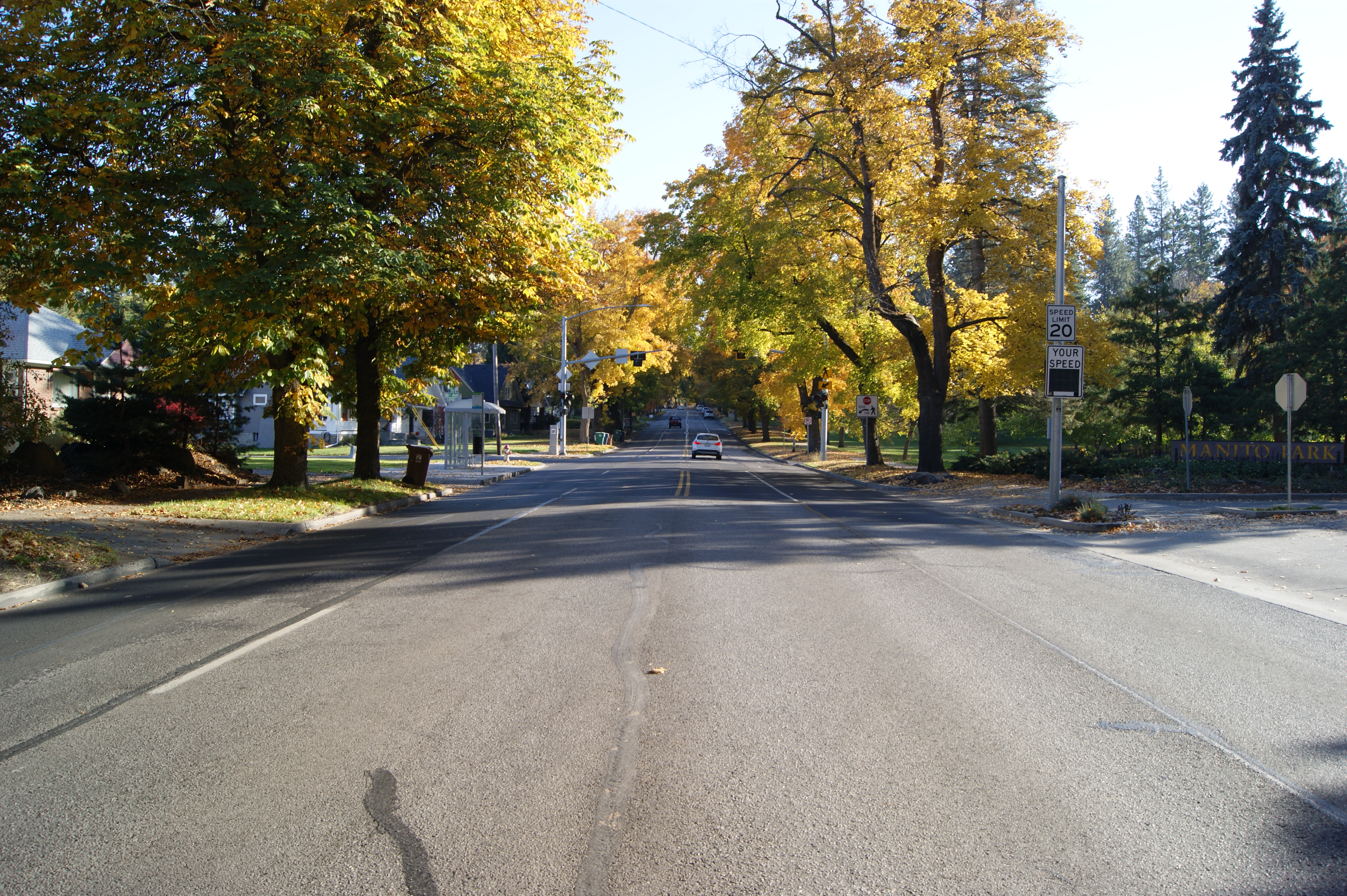
Grand Boulevard at Manito Park, looking south

The neighborhood is well integrated into the city's transportation system. It is bounded on three sides by roads classified as urban principle arterials. In addition, Lincoln and Bernard Streets are classified as urban minor arterials. The neighborhood and its arterials have increased significance during the winter months when there is snowy or inclement weather because Bernard Street and Grand Boulevard within the centrally located neighborhood is one of the north/south "snow corridors" in the city Snow Corridor Plan that leads to downtown and Division Street on the notoriously narrow and hilly streets of the South Hill; this means those roads are prioritized for plowing when the city snowplows are unable to effectively keep all the arterials passable.

Public transit provided by Spokane Transit Authority also serves the neighborhood. Route 4, a frequent main line that traverses the city from north to south, runs along Grand Boulevard. Route 144, a frequent express line that connects the south side of the city with downtown, runs along 29th Avenue and cuts through the middle of the neighborhood on Bernard Street. Route 43, a basic main line, runs along 29th from Bernard to Lincoln then runs down Lincoln through the neighborhood.

Dedicated bicycle lanes run along 29th Avenue, Bernard Street, High Drive and Cedar Street. Listed bicycle routes that do not have dedicated lanes run along 25th Avenue and 17th Avenue.

=== Public Transit ===
The Spokane Transit Authority, the region's public transportation provider, serves Manito/Cannon Hill with seven fixed schedule bus lines.

Route	Termini			Service operation and notes	Streets traveled
4; Moran Prairie	Downtown Spokane; STA Plaza	↔	Glenrose; Moran Station Park & Ride	High-frequency route	Grand Boulevard
43; Lincoln/37th Avenue	Downtown Spokane; STA Plaza	↔	Lincoln Heights; South Hill Park & Ride	Basic-frequency route	Lincoln Street, 29th Avenue
144; South Express	Downtown Spokane; STA Plaza	↔	Glenrose; Moran Station Park & Ride	Express route at peak hours	Lincoln Street, 29th Avenue
