= Gruel (computer worm) =

2003 computer worm

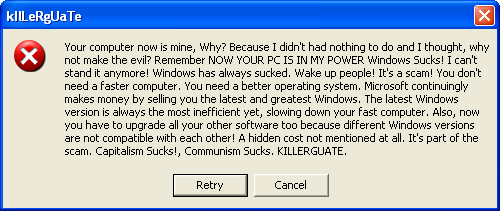
- Dialogue box displayed by the worm

Malware details
- Alias: Fakerr
- Type: Computer worm

Technical details
- Platforms: Windows 9x, Windows ME, Windows 2000 and Windows XP
- Size: 102,400 bytes

Gruel was a worm that first surfaced in 2003, targeting Microsoft Windows platforms such as Windows 9x, Windows ME, Windows 2000 and Windows XP. The worm is also known as Fakerr, a name used by F-Secure. It spread via email and file sharing networks.

== Symptoms ==
=== Arrival and initial launch ===
The worm arrived as an attachment with various names in emails claiming to be a security update from either Microsoft or Symantec, depending on the variant. When run, the worm installs itself to the system and displays a fake Windows Error Reporting dialog box, which the user cannot move or close and contains two buttons: "Send Error" and "Send and Close", if the user clicks on the "Send Error" button, the worm mass-mails itself to all the user's contacts and displays fictitious "technical details" about the supposed error report, which contains a Back button and a Close button. Clicking the Back button will return to the original error reporting box, whereas the Close button does not do anything. When the user presses "Send and Close", the worm will disable or terminate Windows Explorer, eject the CD/DVD drive, open many Control Panel options, and then display a dialogue box that cannot be closed, which contains two buttons, "Retry" and "Cancel".

The text of the error message, filled with grammatical errors, is as follows:

Your computer now is mine, Why? Because I didn't had nothing to do and I thought, why not make the evil? Remember NOW YOUR PC IS IN MY POWER Windows Sucks! I can't stand it anymore! Windows has always sucked. Wake up people! It's a scam! You don't need a faster computer. You need a better operating system. Microsoft continuingly makes money by selling you the latest and greatest Windows. The latest Windows version is always the most inefficient yet, slowing down your fast computer. Also, now you have to upgrade all your other software too because different Windows versions are not compatible with each other! A hidden cost not mentioned at all. It's part of the scam. Capitalism Sucks!, Communism Sucks. KILLERGUATE.

=== Secondary payload ===
After carrying out the above payload, the virus hangs the operating system, requiring users to perform a Hard boot by forcibly shutting the machine down by cutting the power, then turning the machine back on. Afterwards, the PC is completely unusable, as all .bat, .com, .exe, .ht, .hta, .pif and .scr files have been hooked to the virus itself – by attempting to run any of the programs, the worm is simply activated again and will release its primary payload. Some variants will delete core files so the PC cannot even enter the operating system, because it will just display the message "Windows could not start because the following file is missing".

== See also ==
- List of computer worms
