= Greul =

Greul may refer to:

- Simon Greul (born 1981), German tennis player
- Greul River, tributary of the Pârâul Negru in Romania

== See also ==
- Greuel
- Gruel
- Kreul
