= Southgate, Spokane =

Southgate
- Spokane Neighborhood
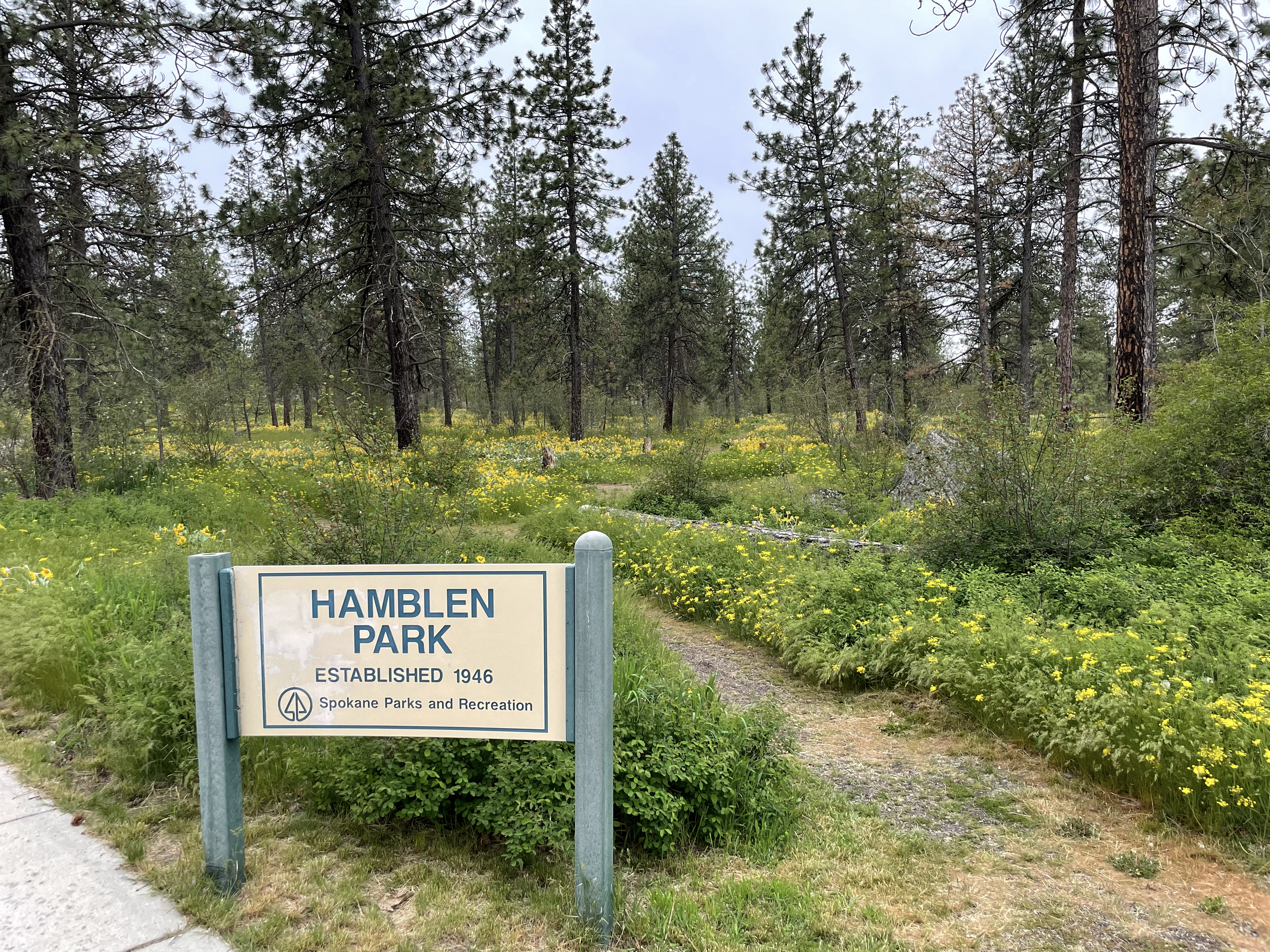
- Hamblen Park in spring

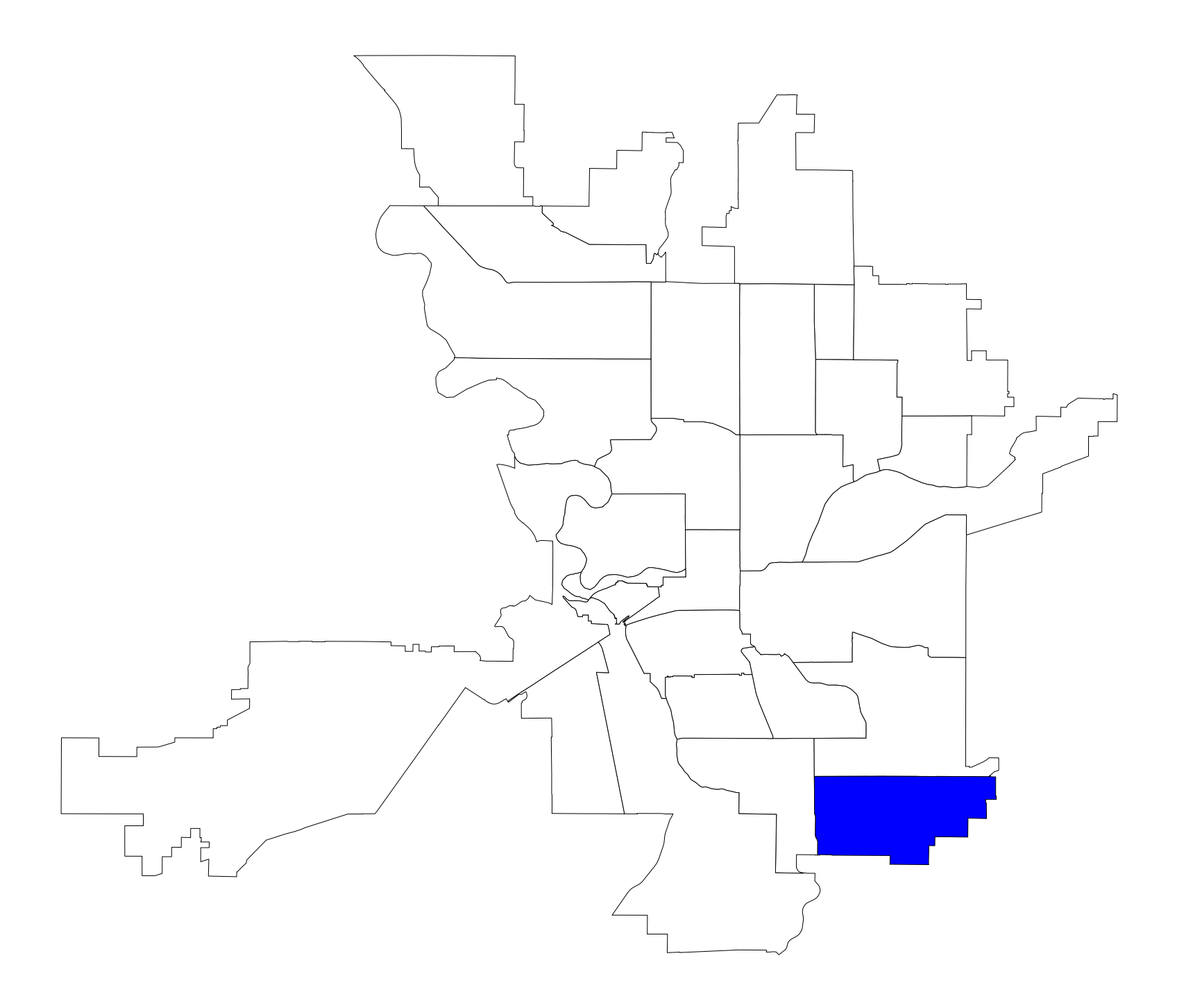
- Location within the city of Spokane
- Coordinates: 47°36′48.7″N 117°22′06.3″W
- Country: United States
- State: Washington
- County: Spokane
- City: Spokane

Population (2017)
  - Total: 9,700
- Time zone: UTC-8 (PST)
  - Summer (DST): UTC-7 (PDT)
- ZIP Codes: 99203, 99223
- Area code: 509

Southgate is a neighborhood in Spokane, Washington. It is located in the southwestern corner of the City of Spokane and part of the broader area known locally as the South Hill. Southgate is one of the newer neighborhoods in the city, with development first taking hold in the post-World War II housing boom and continuing into the present day. It is a mix of single-family residential, multi-family residential and commercial districts. The neighborhood has grown as Spokane has expanded southward, with multiple annexations expanding Southgate and the city since 2000 and as recently as 2016.

== History ==
What is now Southgate has been inhabited by the Spokane people for centuries. The area was historically the site of a travel route from the Spokane River in the north to Latah Creek in the south.

European-American settlers first made their presence known in the Southgate area when the Mullan Road was constructed between 1859 and 1860, passing through Southgate near present-day Havana Street. The Mullan Road was the first wagon road to cross the Rocky Mountains into the Pacific Northwest and connected what is now Montana with present-day Spokane and beyond to Fort Walla Walla. Homesteading began in the area when Joe Jackson, from Missouri, moved in and established a supply stop for prospectors and trappers passing through. Jackson sold his land in 1870 to the Joseph Morin, a French-Canadian rancher. Morin's land was subsequently obtained after his death in 1889 by John J. Browne. The Moran Prairie, which occupies the southeastern portion of the neighborhood, and Browne's Mountain, immediately to the southeast, bear the names of these early settlers.

The Spokane and Inland Empire Railroad, an electrified interurban railway reached Browne's farm on the border of present-day Southgate and Glenrose in 1908. It served the neighborhood via the Pine Grove Station at 37th Avenue and Havana Street on the northern edge of the neighborhood. The railroad connected Southgate with more established parts of Spokane to the north as well as the broader Palouse and North Idaho region. The railroad served the community until 1939.

An early commercial district where farmers from the Moran Prairie, Glenrose and Southgate areas sold fruit from their orchards was established at Regal Street and Palouse Highway, which to this day remains a commercial district in the neighborhood. In the 1930s, 1940s and 1950s the original orchards were replaced by greenhouses and chicken farms. Which subsequently gave way to residential and commercial development which continues to this day.

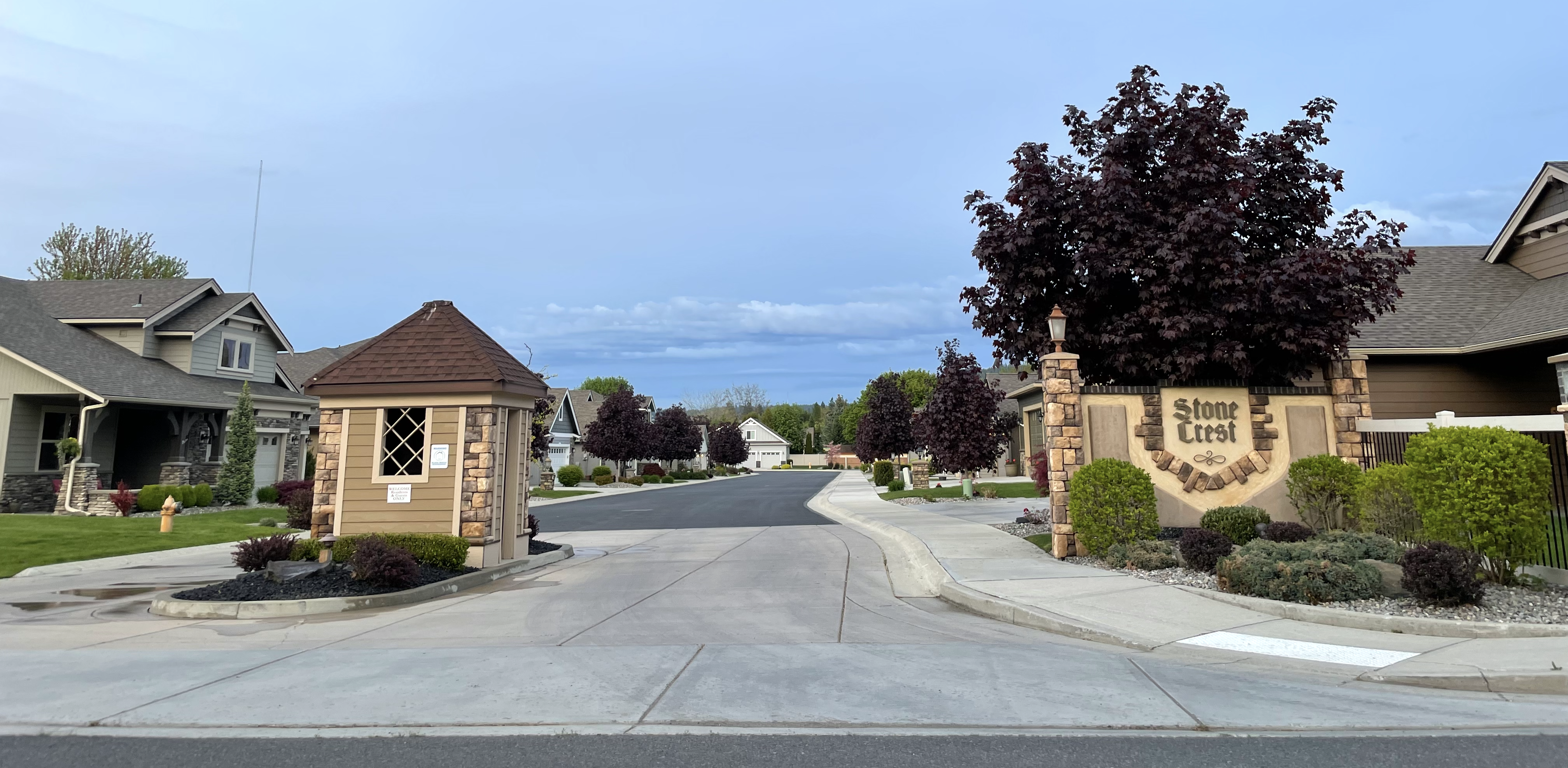
Gated community in Southgate

The northern tier of the neighborhood, from 44th Avenue north to 37th Avenue, was incorporated into the City of Spokane in 1907. Subsequent annexations brought the areas from 44th to 50th Avenues into the city between 1958 and 1979. Piecemeal annexations continued to the south and east throughout the 1980s and continuing to as recently as 2016, expanding the neighborhood into its current size. Development has outpaced annexation, and the Southgate area transitions almost imperceptibly into unincorporated Spokane County to the south and east, with only arterials featuring signs delineating the city limits.

Southgate has seen continued infill growth into the 21st century, along with the growth beyond its boundaries, such as in 2013 when ground was broken on a Target store at Palouse Highway and Regal Street and nearby multi-story apartment complexes. In 2025, a 108,000 square foot Home Depot store opened on the former Shopko property at 44th Avenue and Regal Street.

== Geography ==
Southgate is, as the name suggests, situated along the southern edge of the City of Spokane. Its southern and eastern boundaries also serve as the city limits. 37th Avenue makes up the entire northern border, separating it from Lincoln Heights. Perry Street serves as the entire western border, across which lies the Comstock neighborhood. 53rd Avenue constitutes most of the southern border, though from Freya Street it zig-zags to the northeast until reaching 37th Avenue. Beyond 53rd Avenue and the zig-zag boundary lie unincorporated areas of Spokane County including Glenrose.

Though it is located in the broader South Hill area of Spokane, Southgate itself is relatively flat. The South Hill takes its name from the steep relief of the hill as it climbs up from the Spokane Valley floor at Downtown Spokane in the north. Southgate, like the Comstock neighborhood to its west, are located beyond the crest of the hill. Here, the land is at the same relative elevation as the broader, surrounding Columbia Plateau. Elevations rise rapidly to the east and southeast, however, as Southgate and the South Hill give way to Krell Hill, the southernmost peak of the Selkirk Mountains, which begins to rise dramatically within a mile distance from the neighborhood.

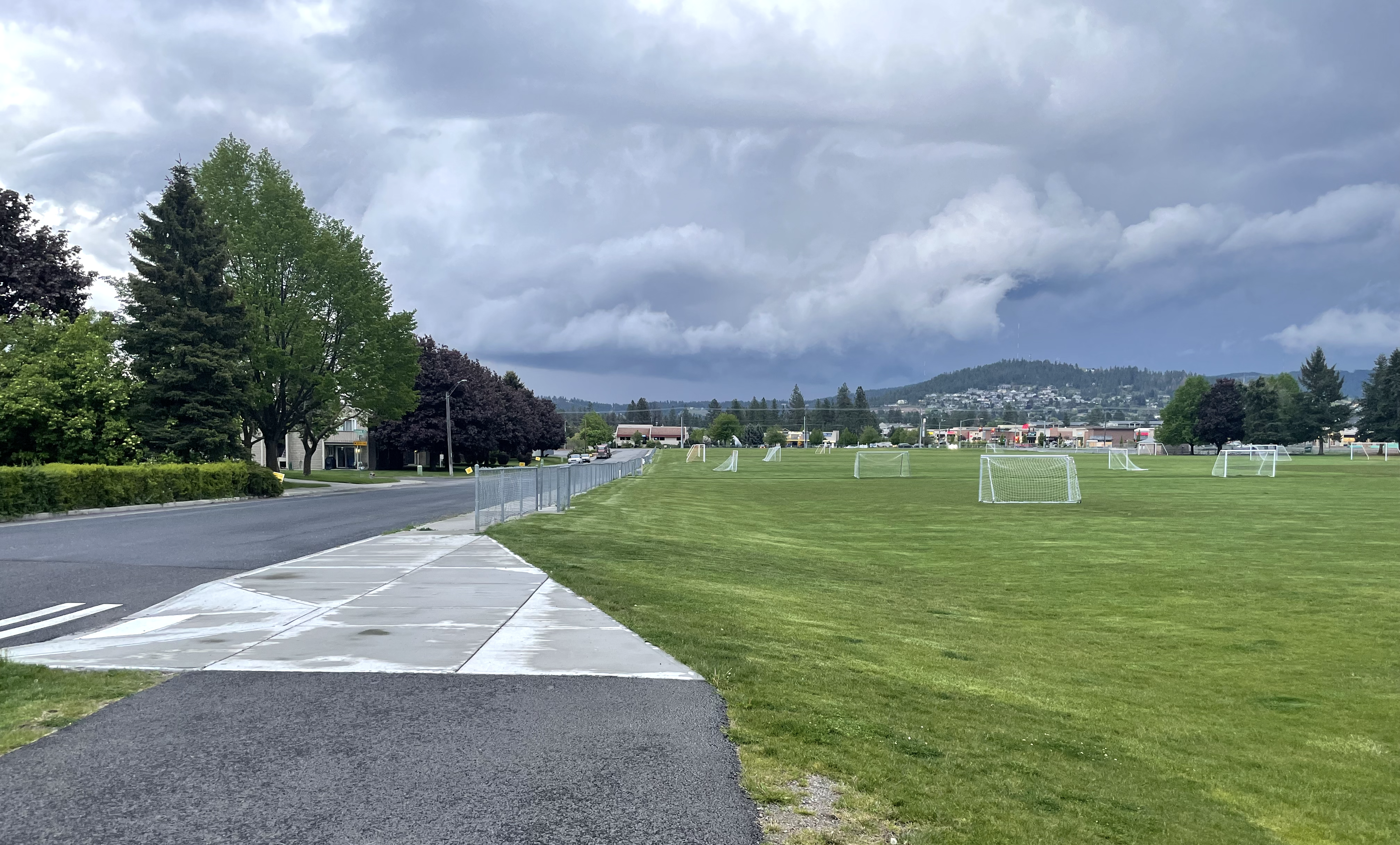
Southeast Sports Complex

As with the rest of Spokane, the neighborhood is dominated by towering ponderosa pine trees. There are also numerous wetlands, ponds and ephemeral streams in Southgate, which drain into the Glenrose basin and ultimately the Spokane River.

In terms of built geography, the neighborhood is mostly single-family residential, with some multi-family residential along the central southern area of Southgate. There are also commercial districts along Regal Street, from 44th Avenue in the north through the southern end of the neighborhood at 53rd Avenue.

The neighborhood is home to three parks. The undeveloped Hamblen Park in the northwest, the sports facilities at the public Southside Sports Complex with many soccer fields and a playground in the neighborhood's center, and the landscaped Ben Burr Park in the east.

The 50-acre campus of Joel E. Ferris High School, located between Regal and Freya Streets along 37th Avenue, and extends four blocks south to Thurston Avenue is located in the north-central portion of the neighborhood.

Just south of Joel E, Ferris High School, Hazel’s Creek, a 1.1 mile loop tail, sits within a City of Spokane natural stormwater management facility. Named after former owner, Hazel O'Byrne, the ecological area features wetlands, wildlife habitat, and educational low-impact development (LID) techniques. It provides a "wilderness sanctuary" setting for walkers.

== Transportation ==
=== City Streets ===
Freya Street, which passes north–south through Southgate, is the neighborhood's only principal arterial as defined by the city of Spokane, and it only holds this distinction south of 43rd Avenue. Minor arterials include Regal Street, which traverses north–south through the center of the neighborhood, 37th Avenue, which serves as the northern boundary, Havana Street in the east and Palouse Highway on the south. Collector roads include Thurston Avenue, Perry Street, Crestline Street and a stretch of 44th Avenue from Freya to Regal.

Bike Lanes follow 37th Avenue across the northern edge of Southgate from Regal east to the city limits. Freya and Havana Streets also have bike lanes extending south from 37th. A shared use path follows 44th Avenue east of Regal.

=== Public Transit ===
The Spokane Transit Authority, the region's public transportation provider, serves Southgate with two fixed schedule bus lines.

Route	Termini			Service operation and notes	Streets traveled
4; Moran Prairie	Downtown Spokane; STA Plaza	↔	Glenrose; Moran Station Park and Ride	High-frequency route	Regal, 57th
43; Lincoln/37th	Downtown Spokane; STA Plaza	↔	Lincoln Heights; South Hill Park & Ride	Basic-frequency route	37th

== Demographics ==
As of 2017, Southgate was home to 9,700 residents across 4,140 households. 39% of households were rented, compared to 45.3% citywide. The median household income was $69,572, compared to $44,768 citywide. 38.6% of students qualified for free or reduced lunch, compared to 54.5% citywide. 52.6% of residents had a bachelor's degree or above and 13.7% had a high school diploma or below. Persons of color made up 14.9% of the population, compared to 15.1% citywide.

92.6% of residents were born in the United States or its territories. Of the residents not born in the United States, 9.7% were from Vietnam, 7.6% from the United Kingdom, 7.3% from Germany and 6.9% from Canada.

== Education ==
The northwestern portion of Southgate is served by Hamblen Elementary, which is located at Thurston Avenue and Crestline. The northeastern portion is part of the Adams Elementary district, located at 37th Avenue and Regal Street just north of Southgate in Lincoln Heights. The eastern portion is part of the Moran Prairie Elementary district, which is located just southeast of Southgate. Hamblen and Adams feed into Carla Peperzak Middle School, currently under construction to the south as of 2022, while Moran Prairie feeds into the existing Chase Middle School on 37th in Lincoln Heights. All three elementary schools serving Southgate feed into Joel E. Ferris High School, located in the north-central portion of the neighborhood at 37th and Regal Street. In April 2026, the original 1910 Adam’s Elementary School building and portable classrooms were demolished to make way for a new building that is expected to be completed for the 2027–2028 school year.
