= Kreil =

Kreil is a German language surname. Notable people with the name include:

- Karl Kreil (1798–1862), Austrian meteorologist and astronomer
- Nicole Kreil (born 1965), Austrian diver
- Tanja Kreil (born 1977), German electrician

== See also ==
- Kreil, Netherlands
