= Greuel =

Greuel is a surname of German origin. Notable people with the surname include:

- Dick Greuel (1928–2013), American radio personality, businessman and politician
- Marcelo Greuel (born 1963), Brazilian cyclist
- Wendy Greuel (born 1961), American politician
