= Lincoln Heights, Spokane =

Lincoln Heights
- Spokane Neighborhood
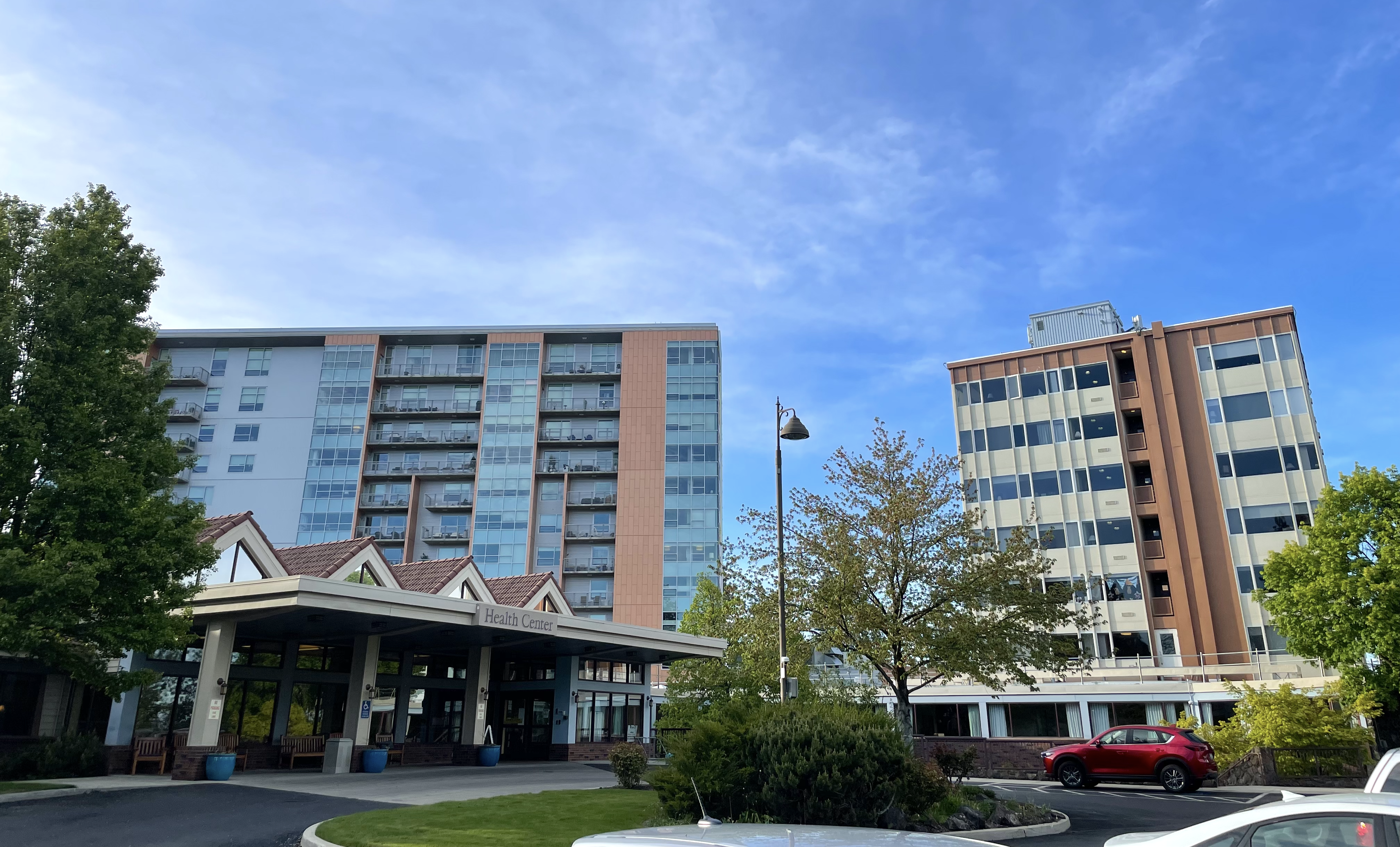
- Retirement community towers in Lincoln Heights

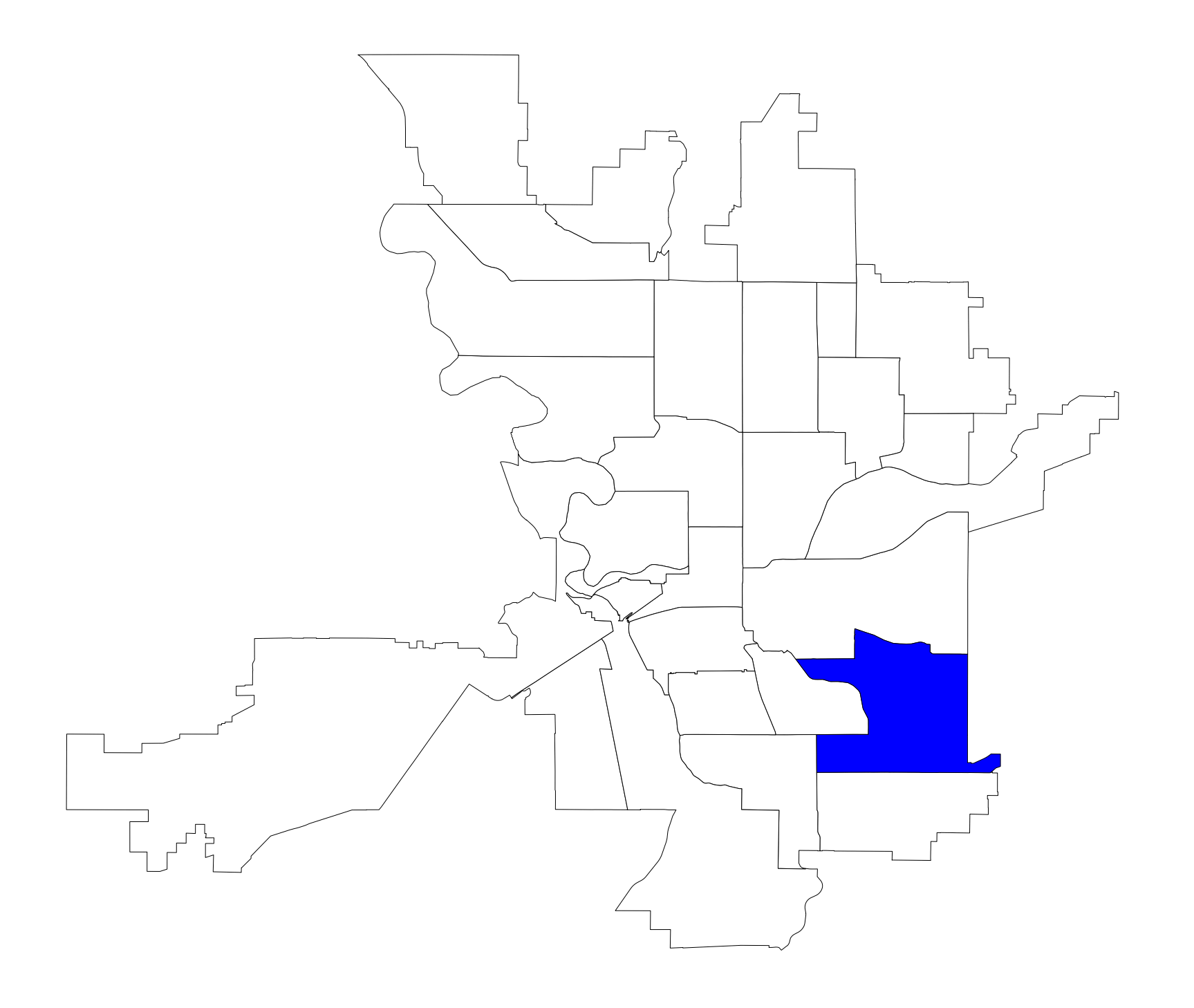
- Location within the city of Spokane
- Coordinates: 47°38′12.0″N 117°22′05.4″W
- Country: United States
- State: Washington
- County: Spokane
- City: Spokane

Population (2017)
  - Total: 14,272

Demographics 2017
  - White: 86.4%
  - Latinx: 5.8%
  - Asian/Native Hawaiian/Pacific Islander: 3.3%
  - Black: 3.0%
  - American Indian: 1.2%
- Time zone: UTC-8 (PST)
  - Summer (DST): UTC-7 (PDT)
- ZIP Codes: 99202, 99203 and 99223
- Area code: 509

Lincoln Heights is a neighborhood in Spokane, Washington. It is located in the southeastern portion of the city in a broader area commonly known as the South Hill. As the name suggests, Lincoln Heights lies on the slopes and atop the crest of the South Hill area. Lincoln Heights is home to a mix of single-family residential, multi-family residential, and commercial areas and a significant amount of park land. The Lincoln Heights Shopping Center and surrounding area is one of the largest and most important commercial and retail districts on the entire south side of Spokane.

== History ==
What is now Lincoln Heights was inhabited by the Spokane people for centuries.

In 1885, what is now Lincoln Heights was connected with the then burgeoning city of Spokane via a county road laid along the route of 29th Avenue. As the region recovered from the Great Spokane Fire of 1889 and Panic of 1893, Lincoln Heights saw rapid development. Streetcars arrived in the mid-1890s, with a line extending along 29th Avenue east to Myrtle Street and lines terminating in the northern, lower portion of the neighborhood at 12th Avenue and Altamont Boulevard and another at 17th Avenue and Ray Street. These lines were laid in part to help sell home sites in the neighborhood.

As part of their plan for the layout of the city in 1908, the Olmsted Brothers recommended establishing a large park in the north of the neighborhood. In 1912, the Hutton family, philanthropists and landowners in the neighborhood, donated 31 acres of land that became Lincoln Park. The Huttons would build their Colonial Revival mansion residence next to the park in 1914, at a cost of $45,000 ($1,300,990.50 in 2022 dollars).

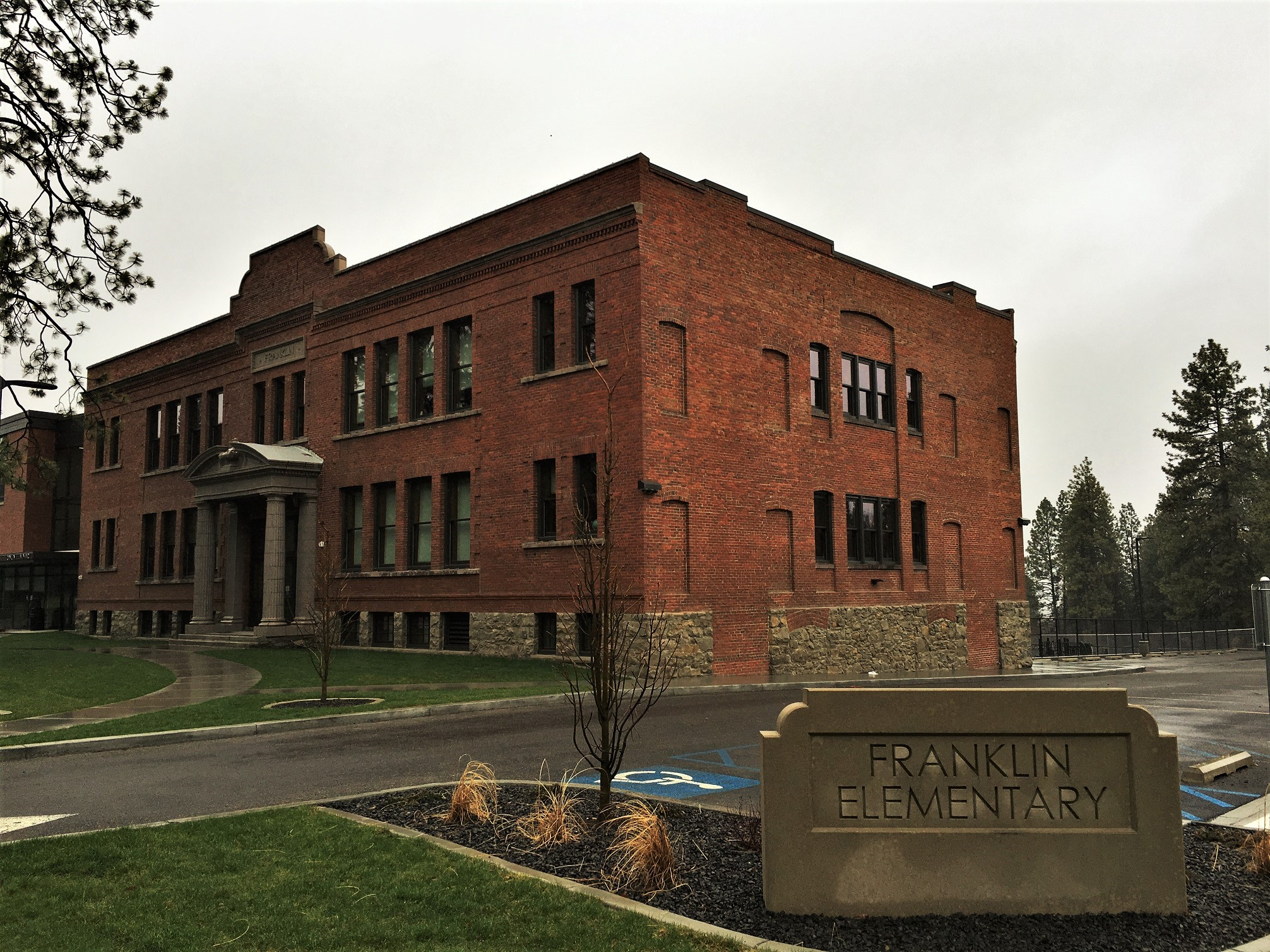
Franklin Elementary School

Charles Francis Adams Jr., a wealthy landowner from Boston and member of the politically powerful Adams family, sold his family's 900-acre plot of land on the eastern edge of Lincoln Heights, which opened it up for development. On the neighborhood's northern edge, Adams Elementary School was named for him. After an initial surge in purchases in the Lincoln Heights Addition, construction slowed, and the neighborhood retained a mixed rural and urban character through the early decades of the 20th century.

Franklin Elementary, located at 17th Avenue and Mt. Vernon Road, a few blocks down the road from the Hutton home, was built in 1909. Though the school has been remodeled and expanded in the century since, the original building remains.

In the 1950s, the neighborhood took on its importance as a commercial center for the south side of the city when the Lincoln Heights Shopping Center was constructed at 29th Avenue and Regal Street. It would be expanded further in the 1970s and has been surrounded by other commercial zones in the years since.

The neighborhood's dual rural and urban character in the first half of the 20th century faded away as infill developments took place in the 1970s and 1980s. In the southern and eastern portions of Lincoln Heights, the farthest from the city center, this has resulted in craftsman homes from the early 20th century next to late 20th century split-level and ranch-style homes.

=== Historic places ===
Lincoln Heights is home to five properties listed on the National Register of Historic Places. All five are located in the older, lower part of the neighborhood which is closer to the city center than the higher, newer areas of Lincoln Heights to the south and east.

	Name on the Register	Image	Date listed	Location	Description
1	Gus and Florence Ehrenberg House	Gus and Florence Ehrenberg House	August 16, 2007 (#07000832)	1304 S. Cook St. 47°38′43″N 117°22′25″W	Built in 1911.
2	Franklin Elementary School	Franklin Elementary School	May 1, 2017 (#100000946)	2627 E. 17th Ave. 47°38′26″N 117°22′17″W	
3	Levi and May Arkwright Hutton House	Levi and May Arkwright Hutton House	February 21, 2002 (#02000088)	2206 W. 17th Ave. 47°38′24″N 117°22′40″W	Built in 1914, this was the home of May Arkwright.
4	Koerner House	Koerner House	July 28, 1999 (#99000915)	1824 S. Mount Vernon St. 47°38′20″N 117°22′11″W	Built in 1912.
5	Ralston and Sarah Wilbur House	Ralston and Sarah Wilbur House	March 15, 2006 (#06000136)	2525 E. 19th Ave. 47°38′26″N 117°22′18″W	Built in 1916.

== Geography ==
As the name suggests, Lincoln Heights is located on the slopes and crest of Spokane's South Hill area, the local name for the broader southern side of the city. The slopes rise from the Spokane Valley below to the elevation of the Columbia Plateau. In places, like in Lincoln Park, the slope is so steep that it exists as vertical faces of exposed Columbia River Basalt Group rock cliffs. The neighborhood rises from approximately 2,000 feet in the north to 2,300 feet in the south.

Havana Street serves as the eastern boundary of Lincoln Heights and the City of Spokane. The unincorporated Glenrose neighborhood lies to the east. 37th Avenue is the northern border, stretching west from Havana Street to Perry Street. The western side of Lincoln Heights is interrupted by the Rockwood neighborhood, appearing on a map as if a bite has been taken out of it. The western border runs along Perry Street from 37th to 29th Avenues, where it cuts east along 29th for more than half a mile. At 29th Avenue and Southeast Boulevard, the border follows Southeast around the curving eastern edge of Rockwood to 14th Avenue. At 14th, the northern border runs east from Southeast Boulevard to Crestline Street, cutting north for six blocks. From Crestline to Havana, the northern border mostly follows a ridge along which the Ben Burr Trail is located.

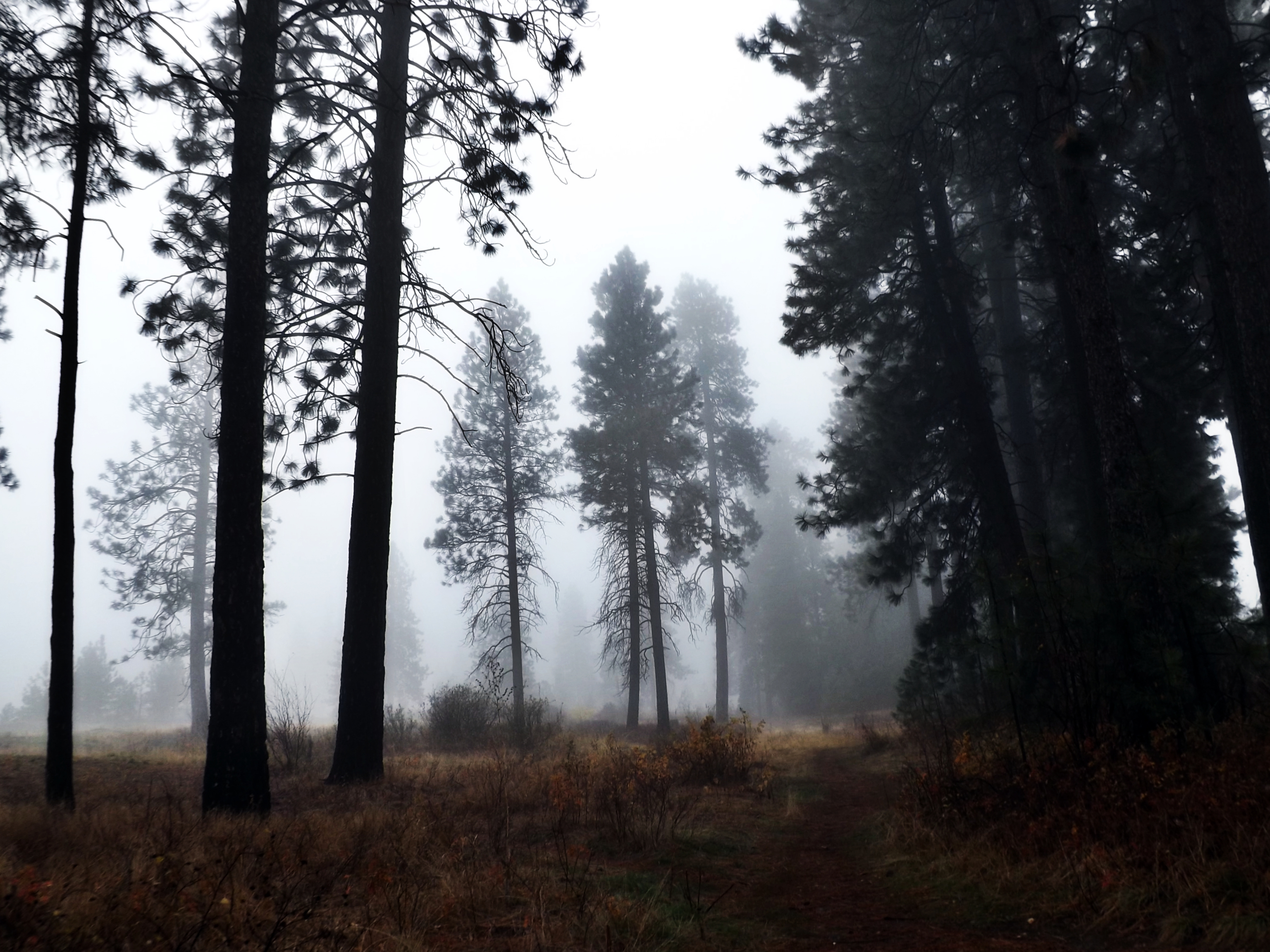
Lincoln Park

As with the rest of the city of Spokane, parkland is an important feature of Lincoln Heights. Lincoln Park spans the upper and lower portions of the neighborhood and takes up 51 acres. Thornton Murphy Park, adjacent to the Lincoln Heights Shopping Center, is 8 acres large. Froggy Pond is a five-acre space at 30th Avenue and Havana Street in the southeastern section of the neighborhood. Along the northern edge of Lincoln Heights runs the Ben Burr Trail connecting Liberty and Underhill Parks in neighboring East Central. A grassy and tree-lined parkway runs down the middle of 35th Avenue from Regal Street in the center of the neighborhood to the city limits on the east. There are also outdoor recreation opportunities at the three public elementary school campuses and one public middle school campus in Lincoln/Heights.

Most of the neighborhood, especially the eastern and southern portions, conform to the city's street grid. However, along the ridge that runs through the middle of the neighborhood, and on the rocky slopes along the north, streets are forced to wind their way through the local terrain. There are many loops and dead-ends in this area.

== Education ==
Lincoln Heights is home to six schools, two private and four public. Franklin Elementary, located at 17th Avenue and Mt. Vernon Road, serves the northern and central portions of the neighborhood. Lincoln Heights Elementary, at 23rd Avenue and Ray Street, serves the eastern areas of Lincoln Heights. At 37th Avenue and Regal Street, Adams Elementary serves the southeastern portion of the neighborhood. The southwestern portion is part of the Hamblen Elementary district, located in the neighboring Southgate neighborhood. A few square blocks in the far northwest corner of the neighborhood are part of the Grant Elementary district, located in neighboring East Central.

Franklin and Lincoln Heights feed into Chase Middle School, located in the far southeastern corner of the neighborhood at 37th Avenue. Adams and Hamblen previously did as well, but are set to move into the district of a new middle school under construction to the south. All of Lincoln Heights, except the small portion which is part of the Grant Elementary and Sacajawea Middle School districts feeds into Joel E. Ferris High School, which is located across the street from Adams Elementary at 37th Avenue and Regal Street. The Grant/Sacajawea portion of Lincoln Heights is served by Lewis and Clark High School.

Private schools in Lincoln Heights are All Saints Primary at 18th Avenue and Freya and All Saints Middle at 33rd Avenue and Perry Street.

== Transportation ==
=== Surface Streets ===
29th Avenue passes through the heart of Lincoln Heights as it traverses the entire South Hill from east to west. It is the only east-west street on the South Hill designated as a principal arterial by the city, and it is a major transportation corridor in both the neighborhood and wider South Hill. Ray Street, running north-south through the eastern half of Lincoln Heights, is designated as a principal arterial as well. Those two, along with Regal Street, a minor arterial, are the only four-lane roads in the neighborhood.

Along with Regal Street, Southeast Boulevard and Freya Street are classified as minor arterials. 17th and 27th Avenues are classified as collectors. At the same time, the rest of the streets in Lincoln Heights are local-access roads.

For cyclists, a dedicated bicycle lane exists along the length of Southeast Boulevard through Lincoln Heights and along 37th Avenue east of Regal Street. Bike routes noted by signage along roadways follow 17th Avenue, 29th Avenue, 37th Avenue west of Regal Street, and Freya Street. A signed bike lane also follows Altamont Boulevard and 11th Avenue in the north of the neighborhood, connecting to the rest of the bike network via Fiske Street. That segment connects with the Ben Burr Trail, which connect with a broader network of non-motorized trails throughout the Spokane area including the vast Spokane River Centennial Trail.

=== Public Transit ===
Lincoln Heights, like the rest of the Spokane metropolitan area, has its public transit provided by the Spokane Transit Authority. The STA serves Lincoln Heights with five fixed-route bus lines. The South Hill Park and Ride is located on East 31st.

Route	Termini			Service operation and notes	Streets traveled
4; Moran Prairie	Downtown Spokane; STA Plaza	↔	Glenrose; Moran Station Park & Ride	High-frequency route	Regal
34; Freya	Chief Garry Park; Spokane Community College	↔	Lincoln Heights; South Hill Park & Ride	Basic-frequency route	Ray, 18th, Freya, 29th, South Hill Park & Ride
43; Lincoln/37th	Downtown Spokane; STA Plaza	↔	Lincoln Heights; South Hill Park & Ride	Basic-frequency route	37th, Ray, 29th, South Hill Park & Ride
45; Perry District	Downtown Spokane; STA Plaza	↔	Lincoln Heights; South Hill Park & Ride	Basic-frequency route	Southeast Boulevard, South Hill Park & Ride

== Demographics ==
As of 2017, Lincoln Heights was home to 14,272 people across 6,364 households. Renters made up 41.3% of those households, below the citywide average of 45.3%. The median household income was $53,572, above the citywide median of $44,768. 53.9% of students qualified for free or reduced lunch, compared to 54.5% for the city. People over age 65 made up 18.2% of residents, while those aged 19 or younger made up 23.8% of residents. 25.8% of households had children.

People born in the United States or its territories made up 91.5% of residents. Of the residents born outside of the United States, 15.4% came from Ukraine, 14.5% from Russia, 13.8% from Moldova and 7.3% from Vietnam.
