= Glenrose, Washington =

Unincorporated community in Washington, United States

- Unincorporated community
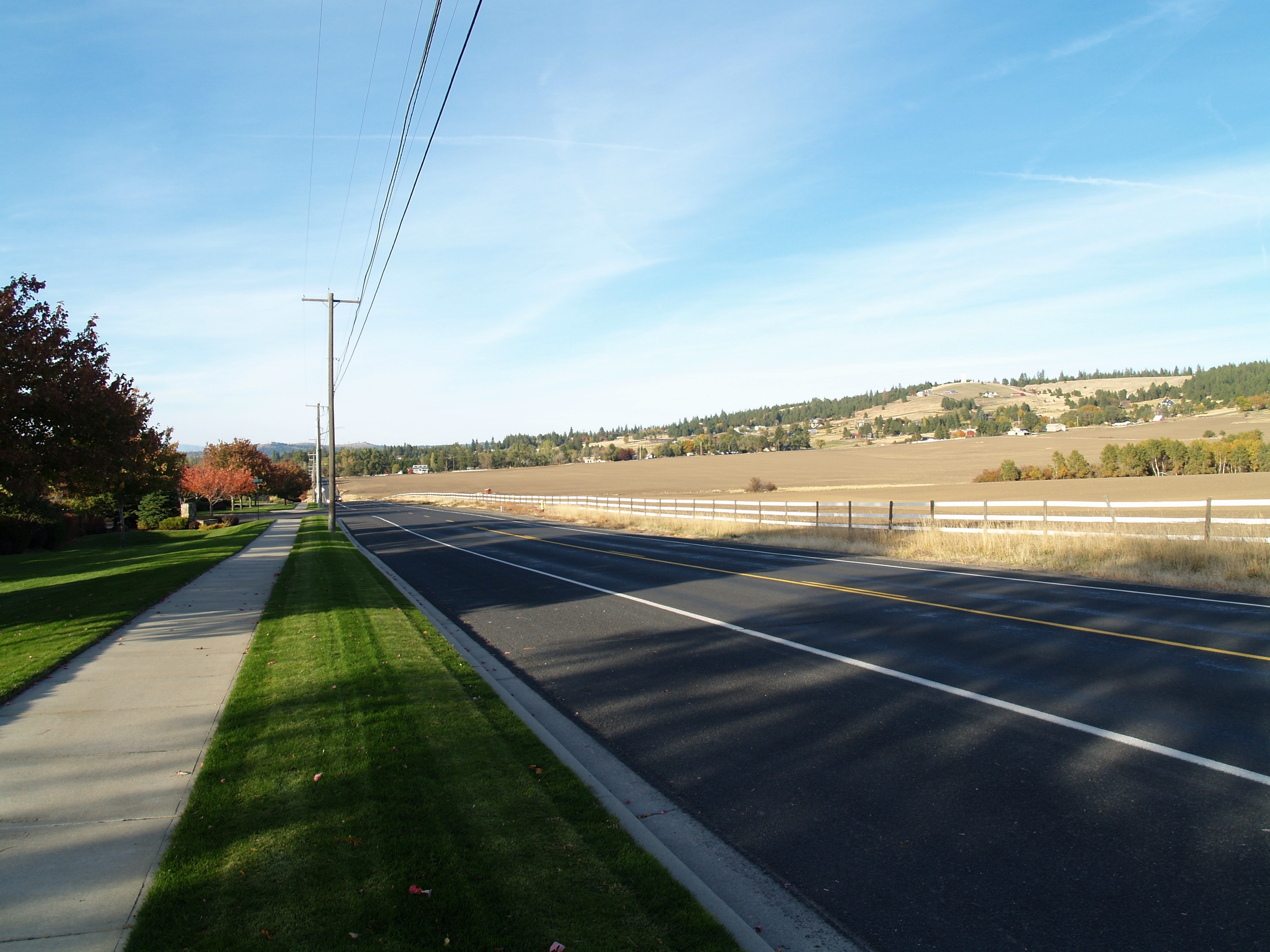

- Location within Washington (state)
- Coordinates: 47°37′41″N 117°20′05″W
- Country: United States
- State: Washington
- County: Spokane
- Elevation: 2,240 ft (680 m)
- Time zone: UTC-8 (Pacific (PST))
  - Summer (DST): UTC-7 (PDT)
- ZIP code: 99223
- Area code: 509
- GNIS feature ID: 1510993

Glenrose is an unincorporated community in Spokane County, Washington, United States. It is a rural and suburban community split between sections of farmland with many canola fields and new construction of single-family homes. The community is bounded by mountains on two sides and the Spokane urban area on the other two.

== Geography ==
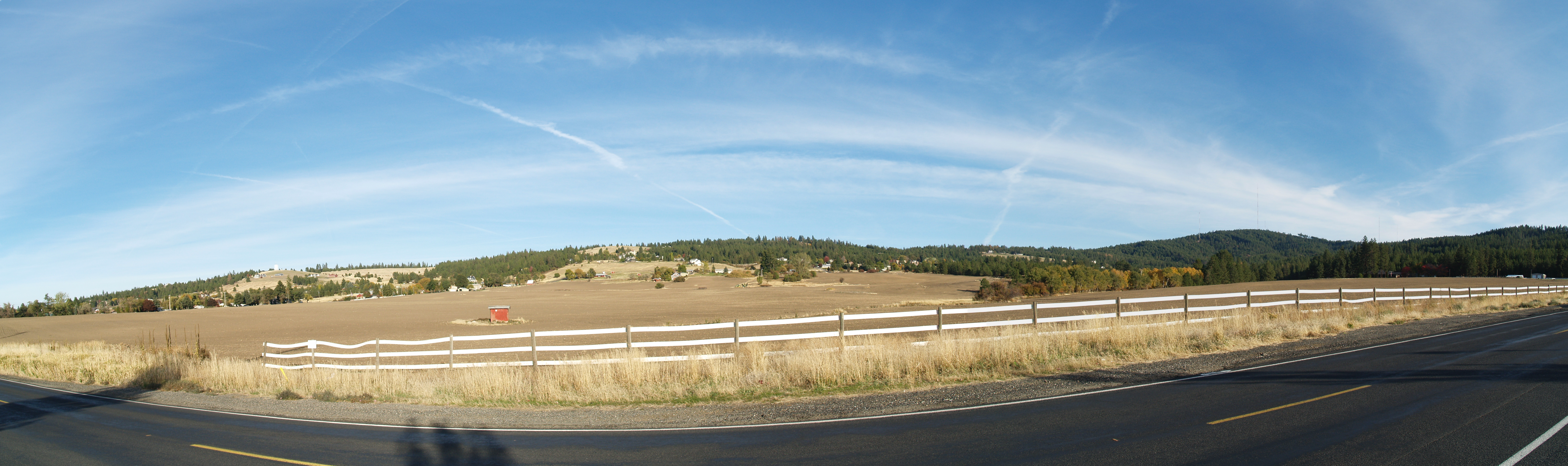
Panoramic view of southern Glenrose from Glenrose Road.

Located on a prairie of the same name, Glenrose sits immediately to the east of the Lincoln Heights and Southgate neighborhoods of the South Hill section of the city of Spokane, and immediately north of the city of Spokane Valley. The prairie slopes upward to the east and south towards Krell Hill and the associated Dishman Hills, some of the southernmost peaks of the Selkirk Mountains. Main thoroughfares include Glenrose Road, which bisects the prairie north to south, and 29th and 37th Avenues, which cross west to east from the developed area of Spokane. There are no roads crossing over the ridges to the east.

Numerous drainageways cut through the prairie giving it a rolling appearance similar to that of Palouse, located just south of the community beyond Krell Hill. There are wetlands to the south and east of the prairie that serve as the source of these drainageways. Mostly fed by rainwater and runoff, many of these drainageways are ephemeral streams that only carry water after a storm.

The community is predominantly rural, with approximately 500 households with many located on five to 10 acre parcels. However, suburban developments have encroached on the community. The municipal boundaries of both Spokane to the west and Spokane Valley to the north extend right up to the edge of Glenrose, with a small portion of Spokane's city limits extending onto the prairie itself in the vicinity of 29th Avenue. Parts of the community now fall within the Spokane's defined urban growth area. Subdivisions and suburban developments extend eastward from Spokane as far as Glenrose Road on the southern portion of the community.

== History ==
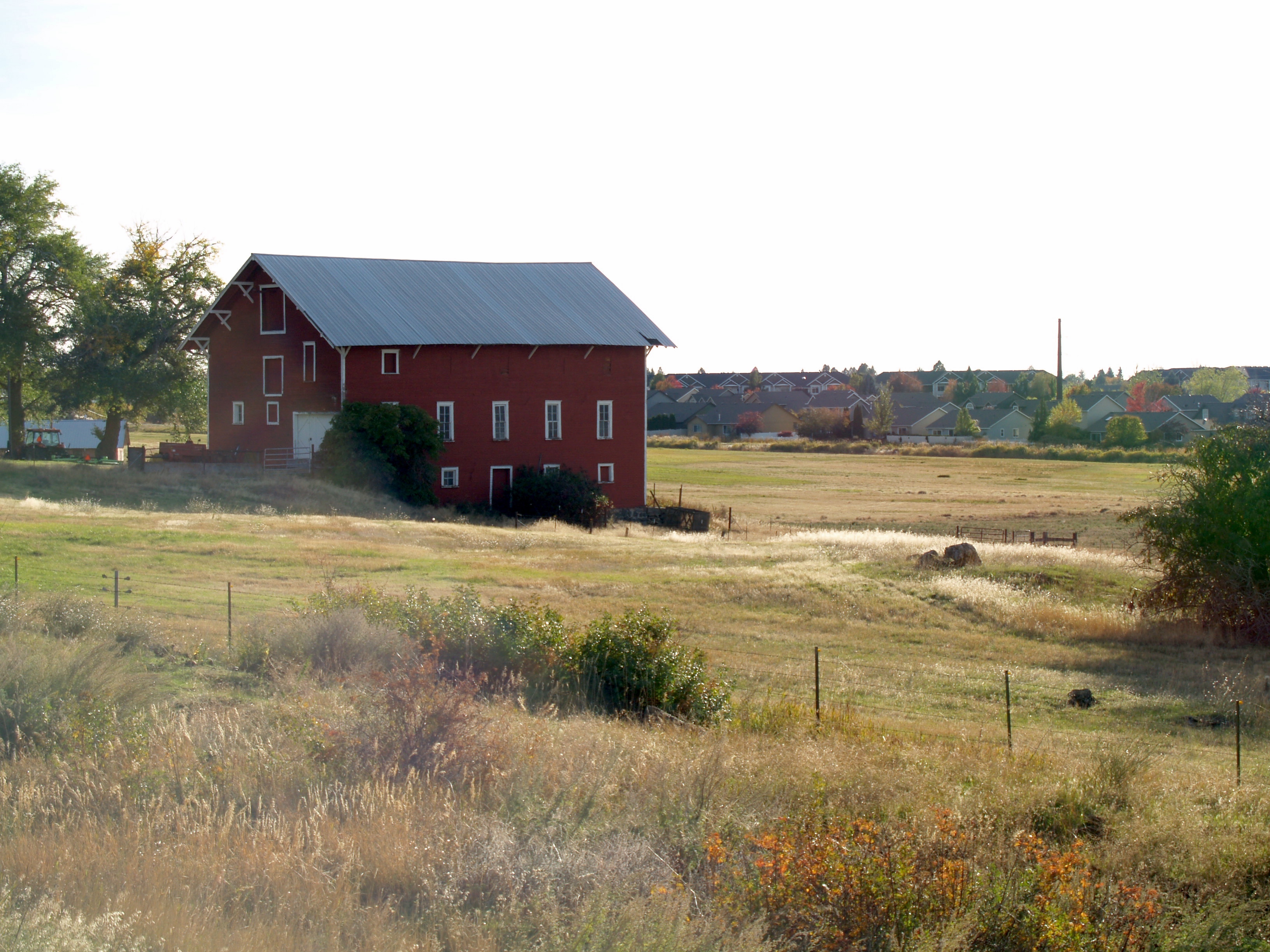
A view from Glenrose Road of suburban expansion onto the prairie.

The Mullan Road, the first wagon road to cross the Rocky Mountains into the Pacific Northwest, passed through Glenrose. That brought settlers in the 1860s and 1870s who were attracted to the area's potential as farmland.

The Spokane and Inland Empire Railroad, an electrified, interurban railway came to Glenrose in 1908. It connected Glenrose and farming areas to the south with the city of Spokane. At the time, Glenrose was home to many orchards. The railroad operated in the area through 1939 and the tracks were removed in the following decade.

Over the decades, as the Spokane area has grown, the rural character of Glenrose has come under threat due to suburban expansion. In 2013, Spokane County's urban growth area was extended into Glenrose. A youth sports complex development was proposed in 2008, drawing protest from Glenrose residents. The controversy surrounding the proposed development is ongoing as of 2020.
