= Krell (surname) =

Krell is a surname. Notable people with the surname include:

- David Farrell Krell (born 1944), American philosopher
- Gene Krell, American fashion entrepreneur, designer, and journalist
- Nikolaus Krell (c. 1551–1601), chancellor of the elector of Saxony
- William Krell (1868–1933), ragtime composer

== See also ==
- Kell (surname)
- Kroll
- Pong Krell, a character from Star Wars
