= Krell Hill =

Mountain in Washington (state), United States

- Tower Mountain
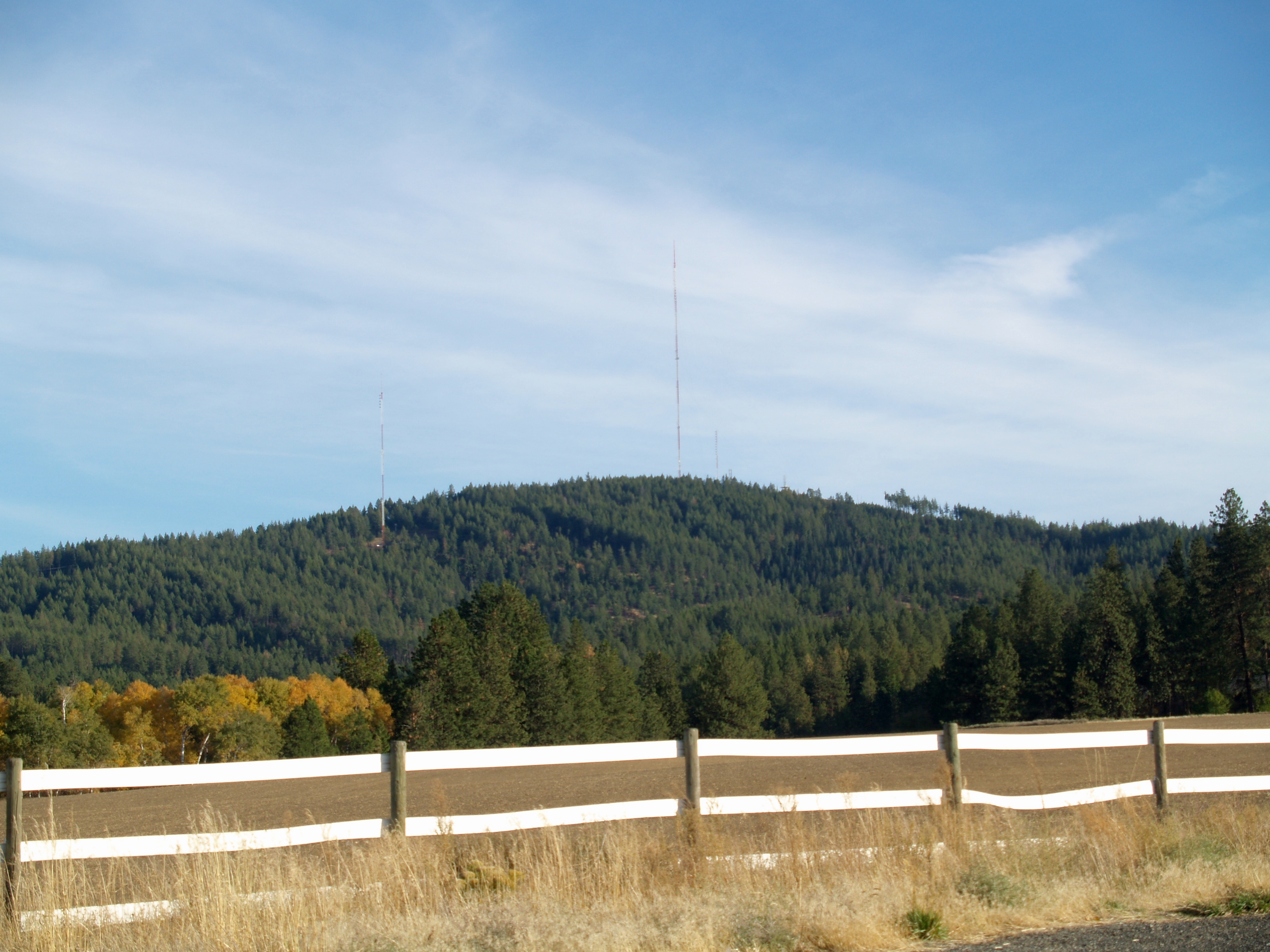

Highest point
- Elevation: 3,658 ft (1,115 m) NAVD 88
- Prominence: 1,186 ft (361 m)
- Coordinates: 47°34′45″N 117°17′51″W

Geography
- Location within Washington (state)
- Location: Spokane County, Washington, U.S.
- Parent range: Selkirk
- Topo map: USGS Spokane SE

Krell Hill, also known as Tower Mountain, is a peak at the southern end of the Selkirk Mountains in Spokane County, Washington. It rises abruptly to the southeast of the relatively flat South Hill area of the city of Spokane. An area of high topographical relief continues to the east of the mountain towards Mica Peak and the Coeur d'Alene Mountains of the Bitterroot Range, in turn part of the Rocky Mountains. To the north the mountain descends slowly along a ridge, and then into the lower Dishman Hills and eventually into Spokane Valley. To the south and west the mountain towers over relatively flat terrain, with the vast farmland of the Palouse and the Columbia Plateau extending as far as the eye can see.

Tower Mountain, while not the official name, is commonly used because of the tall television and radio towers along the ridge atop the mountain. They are prominent at all times of day, but especially at night with their flashing red lights. The towers can be seen from many locations around the Spokane area and northern Palouse. To the north and adjacent to Krell Hill is a slightly smaller mountain peak connected by a ridge; this peak is also sometimes referred to by the same name, due to both peaks containing tall towers.

The mountain rises roughly 1,700 feet above the floor of the Spokane Valley and 1,200 feet above the adjacent portions of the city of Spokane.

== Browne Mountain ==
Browne Mountain is an unofficial neighborhood located just beyond the southeastern tip of the City of Spokane. It is named for pioneer lawyer J.J. Browne, who built one of the first homes in the area in 1908. It sits on the northwesternmost foothill of the Krell Hill, where it abruptly begins its rise from the Glenrose and Moran Prairies. The neighborhood is entirely residential and suburban in nature. Its location on the hillside gives the area panoramic views of Spokane and beyond. Some of the roads in the neighborhood are private.

== Iller Creek Conservation Area ==
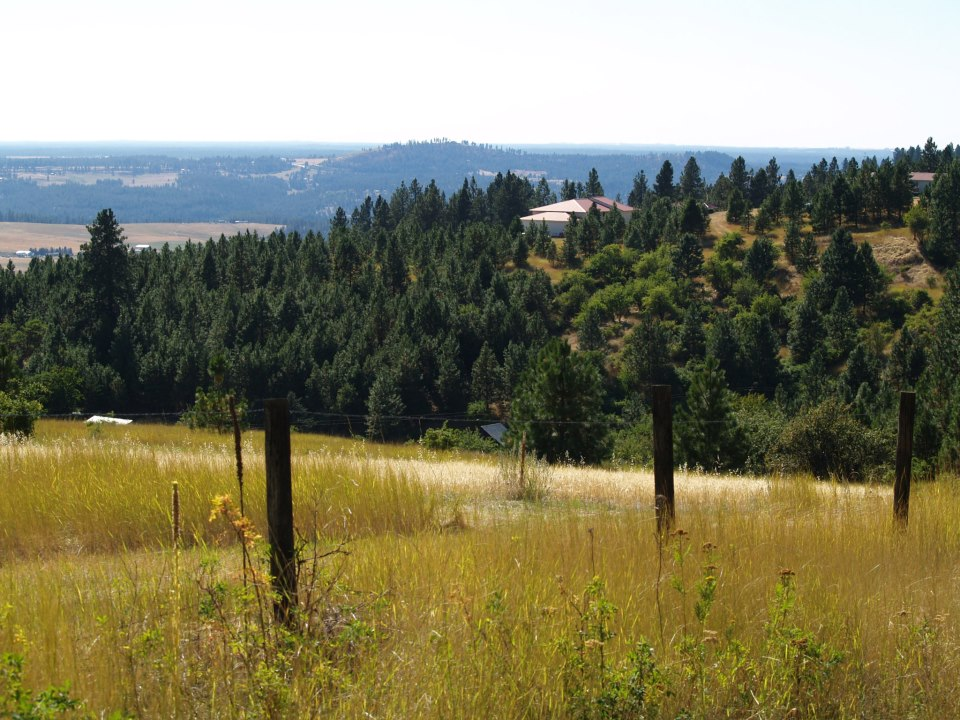
Looking SW From the slope of Krell Hill, September 2012

The Iller Creek Conservation Area consists of 966.62 acres on the eastern side of Krell Hill and is part of Spokane County's Conservation Futures program. Iller Creek drains the eastern slopes of the mountain along with a ridge to the east. The creek's headwaters lie on the northern flank of that ridge which extends eastward from the main peak.

=== Rocks of Sharon ===
Along the ridge that extends eastward from the main peak are the Rocks of Sharon. On some maps the rocks are known simply as "Big Rock", after the largest of the monoliths which is significantly larger and taller than the rest. These granite monoliths are a popular location with rock climbers. The Conservation Futures program, after a few years of negotiations, completed a trailhead on Stevens Creek Road in August 2012 allowing climbers and hikers a shorter route to the rocks from the south. Before the Stevens Creek access was approved visitors had to start from the north at Holman and Rockcrest. From there visitors would hike up the valley of Iller Creek for over 2 miles.
