= Neighborhoods in Spokane, Washington =

Panoramic map of Spokane, 1905

Neighborhoods in Spokane, Washington are officially grouped by the Spokane City Council into three main city council districts: 1, 2, and 3. Each city council district contains multiple, official neighborhoods that are recognized with a neighborhood council. Informally, neighborhoods are colloquially grouped by local geographical, geological, cultural, or historical features (such as South Hill, North Side, Five Mile, Hillyard, South Perry, etc.) The list of neighborhoods below is organized based on the official designations by the City of Spokane. Unofficial neighborhoods and districts are listed within the official neighborhood in which they are located.

Neighborhoods in Spokane range from the late Victorian-era to the contemporary. With major peopling coming from the city's origins as a major rail center in the early 20th century, before the automobile, this has had an indelible impact on the urban form and character of Spokane and its neighborhoods. As the primary mode of transport was rail during its intensive growth phase, Spokane's first neighborhoods were dense streetcar suburbs, neighborhoods outside the hectic downtown where real estate companies developed transit-oriented housing where the interurbans were integral to their convenience and value. Much of Spokane city proper consists of traditionally planned neighborhoods with gridded streets that meet at straight, right angles that are well suited to efficient rail transit and often included a neighborhood shopping center on the block for residents. Spokane's interurban lines extended from Francis Avenue in the north to 38th Avenue on the South Hill. Beyond the former streetcar suburbs lie typical post World War II Suburban developments that consist mostly of single family housing.

== District 1 (Northeast) ==
The northeast side of Spokane extends roughly 7 miles (11 km) north from Downtown Spokane into the suburban Mead area. It is bounded on the west by Division St., the city's north–south meridian, and is bounded on the south by Interstate 90. The northeast side is mostly residential, but contains several large retail districts as well as Gonzaga and Whitworth Universities. Retail centers such as the Northtown Mall and Northpointe Plaza lie along Division Street.

=== Chief Garry Park ===
Named for Spokane Garry, it is a long neighborhood stretching for more than four miles from near the city center at Trent Avenue where it crosses the Spokane River northeast to Felts Field. Home to Spokane Community College.

=== Hillyard ===
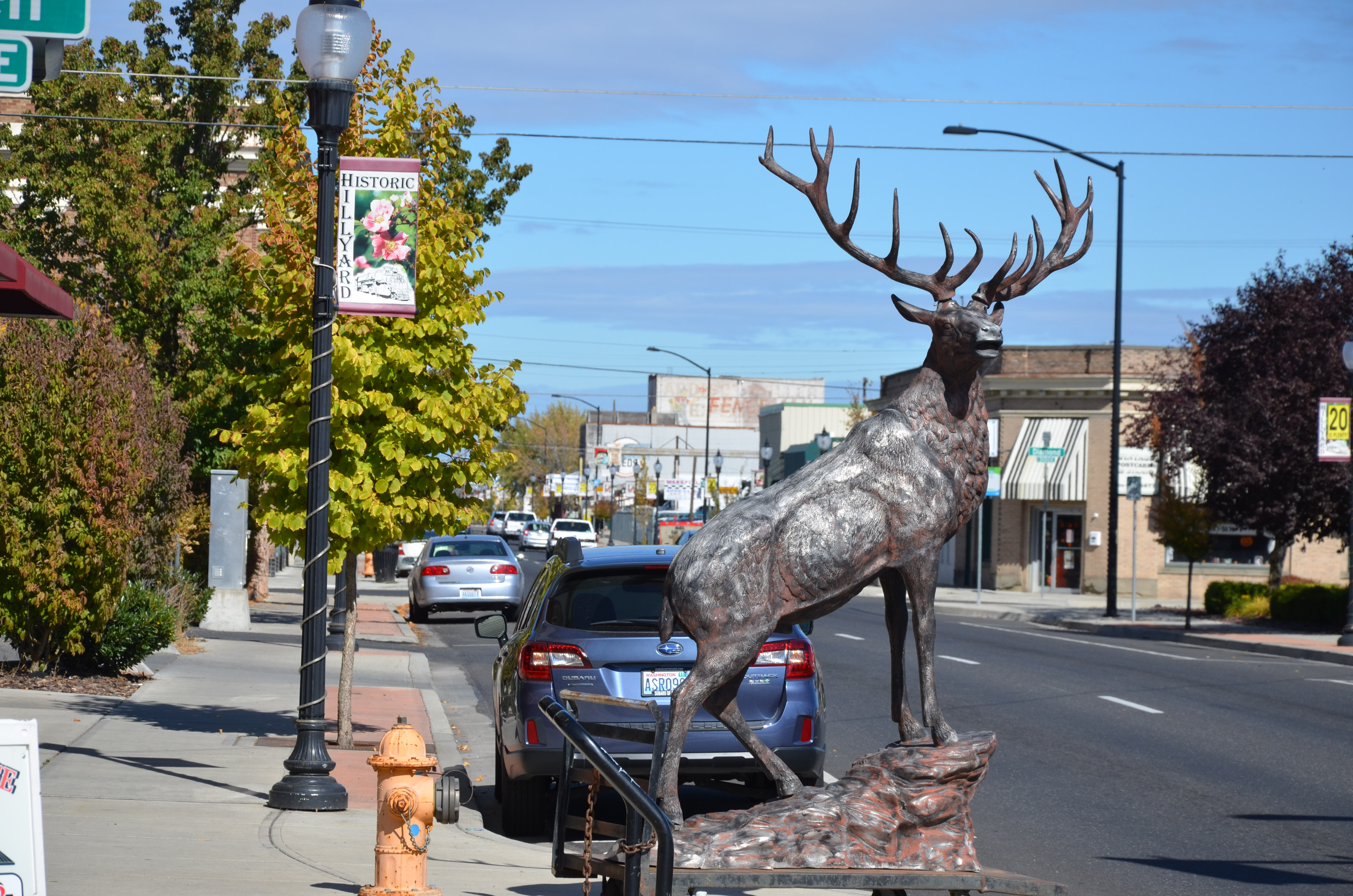
Market Street in Hillyard

Originally a city in its own right, it was later incorporated into the Spokane city limits. Downtown Hillyard, which runs along Market Street, is listed on the National Register of Historic Places as a historic district. Hillyard was named in honor of the Great Northern Railway magnate, James J. Hill. It is the poorest section of Spokane per capita.

=== Logan ===
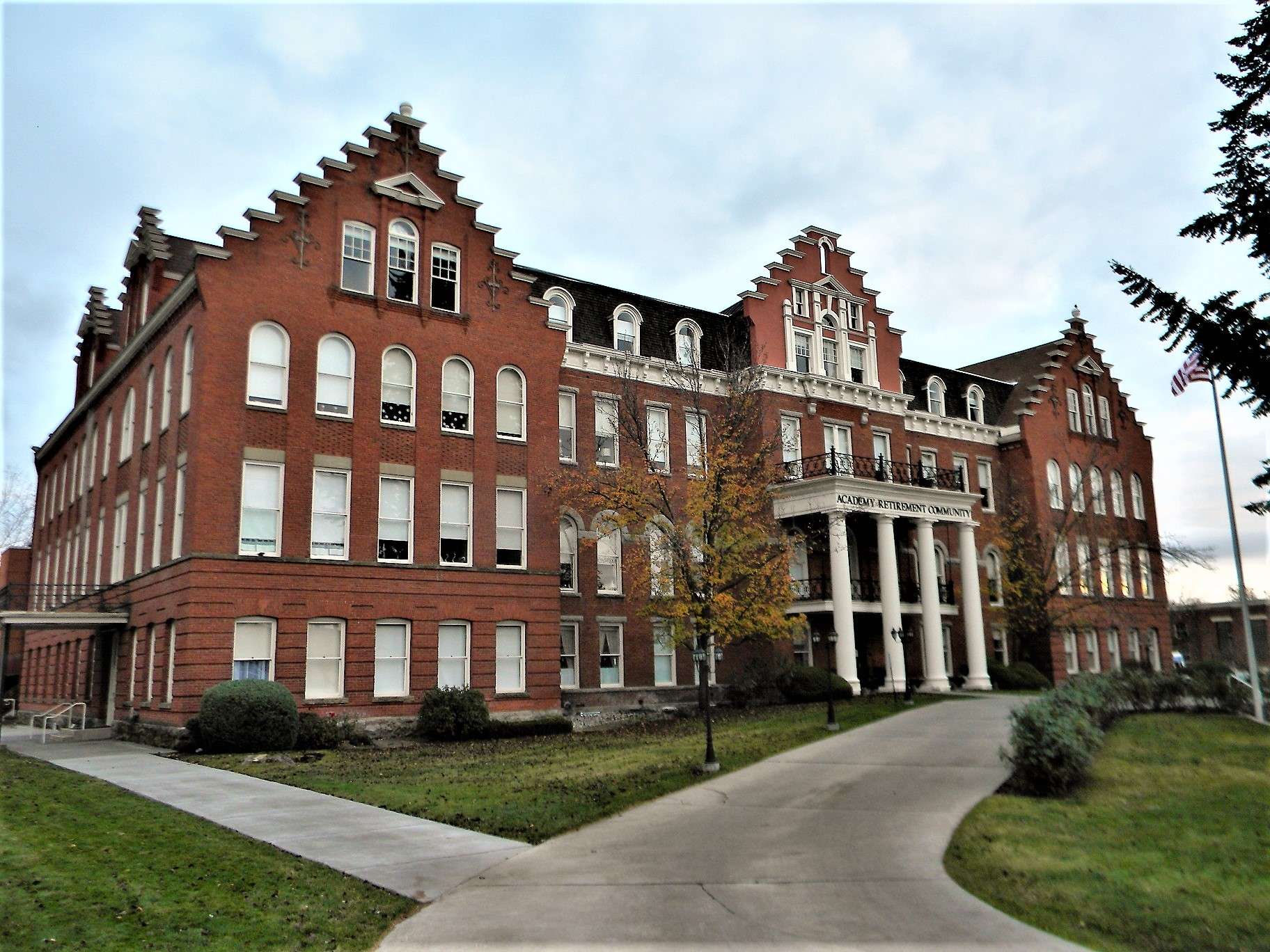
The Holy Names Academy building

The Logan Neighborhood comprises the residential area just north of Gonzaga University in central Spokane. University students occupy many of the neighborhood's homes.

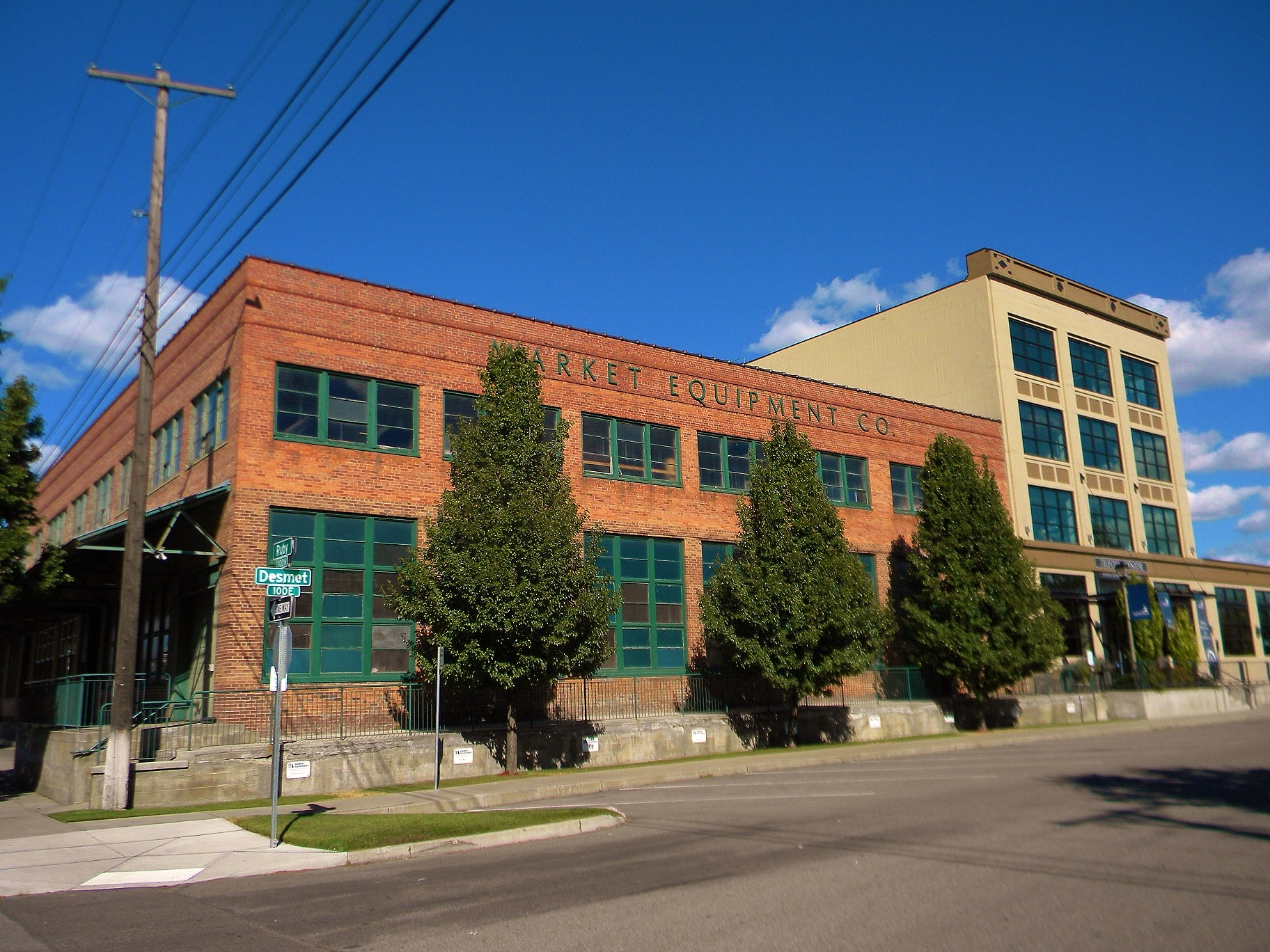
The restored Desmet Avenue Warehouse on the Gonzaga campus

==== University District ====
There are two campuses northeast of downtown, Gonzaga University, and the Riverpoint Campus, which contains branches of Washington State and Eastern Washington Universities, as well as an extension of the University of Washington medical school. A new university, Great Northern University, is also located here, with most students living in homes throughout the Logan Neighborhood. Plans call for increases in the student population in coming years, as well as additional housing, services, and entertainment geared toward a young, professional audience. Significant renewal and renovation, primarily of professional and medical business, is occurring in the area east of Division, west of Hamilton and north of the I-90 freeway.

=== Minnehaha ===
Located along Upriver Drive on the north bank of the Spokane River about 5 miles (8.0 km) east of downtown Spokane, the area is known for the granite climbing rocks and hiking/biking trails of John H. Shields Park. The Centennial bike trail, and a series of small parks and swimming holes along the river make this a popular getaway for city residents. Homes tend to be older along the river, with some newer subdivisions appearing on the terraces and slopes above.

=== Nevada Heights ===
Nevada Heights was established in 2016 when the Nevada/Lidgerwood neighborhood was split at Francis Avenue. The neighborhood encompasses the south half of its predecessor neighborhood. This neighborhood in Northeast Spokane is home to Northtown Mall, which at one time was the largest mall west of the Mississippi. Many houses in this neighborhood were built in the mid-1970s, although new home construction is also common. Whitman Elementary School, Garry Junior High School and John R. Rogers High School are all located within the Nevada Heights neighborhood.

=== Shiloh Hills ===
This neighborhood was established in 2016 when the Nevada/Lidgerwood neighborhood was split at Francis Avenue. Shiloh Hills encompasses the north half of its predecessor neighborhood.

== District 1 & 2 (Northeast and South) ==
=== East Central ===
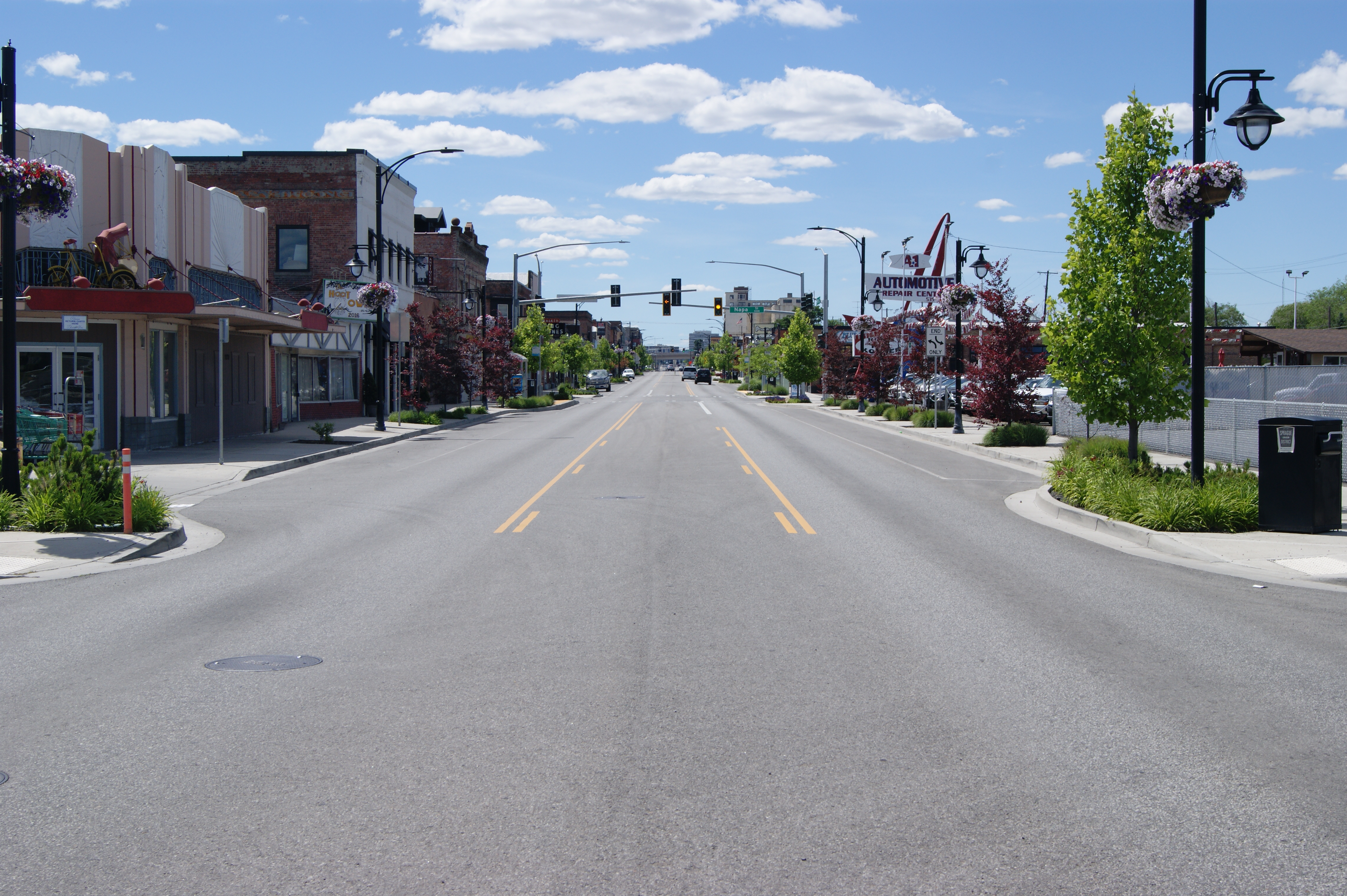
Sprague Union District

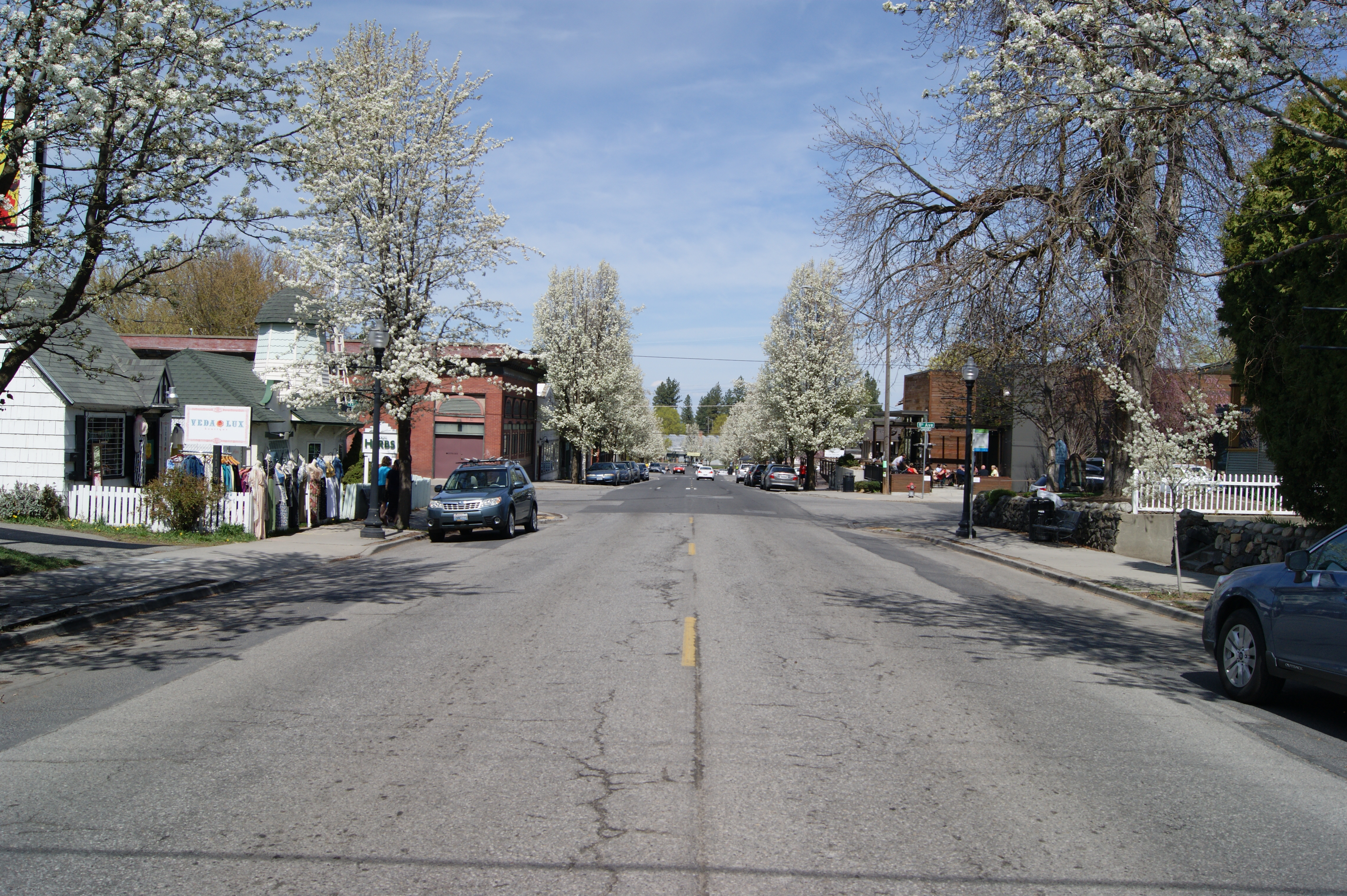
South Perry District with Cambern Dutch Shop Windmill on the left

This neighborhood was bisected when Interstate 90 came through decades ago, and it is still recovering. The area sits at the foot of the South Hill, east of Downtown along the freeway. With plans for feeder lanes to be added to I-90, there will likely be further impact upon the neighborhood. What remains of the residential integrity of the area lies to the south of I-90, mostly in an area known as Liberty Park. The area north of the freeway and east of Hamilton has had little renewal since its original development in the early 20th century.

==== South Perry ====
Like much of Spokane, this street district turned de facto neighborhood dates back to the late 19th century. In the old days, it had two lumberyards, a butcher shop, barber shop, library, ice cream parlor, bakery, steam cleaner and several grocery stores. Today the South Perry Business District is undergoing something of a gentrification-fueled renaissance. Trendy restaurants, bars, shops and cafes have taken over many of the storefronts along Perry Street. Being located just to the southeast of the city center, South Perry was settled in the early days of Spokane and as a result is home to a good bit of history. Grant Elementary has been operating since 1900, though the original building no longer stands. The adjacent Grant Park was established in 1908. One of Spokane's oldest religious congregations, the Liberty Park Methodist Church, has kept its doors open since 1912. Sonora Smart Dodd, regarded as the founder of Father's Day, resided in the neighborhood with her husband. Their Dodd House, built in 1913, is listed on the Spokane Historic Register, the Washington State Heritage Register, and the National Register of Historic Places as a National Landmark. Some of the buildings in the business district date back from the early 1920s, and feature some fine examples of local granite stonework, and decorative shingles. There is even a Dutch windmill, a landmark in the area. The Spokane Buddhist Temple is located in South Perry.

== District 2 (South) ==
The south side of Spokane is largely characterized as Downtown, as well as Browne's Addition and the South Hill, which are home to Spokane's oldest residential areas. Geographically, the "hill" that forms the area encompasses the whole of the city proper south of downtown, from east to west and is characterized by highly variable terrain from block to block. From Downtown, the view of the South Hill is dominated by evergreen trees and two large man-made features: Sacred Heart Medical Center, which is Spokane's largest hospital, and the Cathedral of St. John the Evangelist, seat of the Episcopal Diocese of Spokane, and a magnificent example of modern English Gothic architecture.

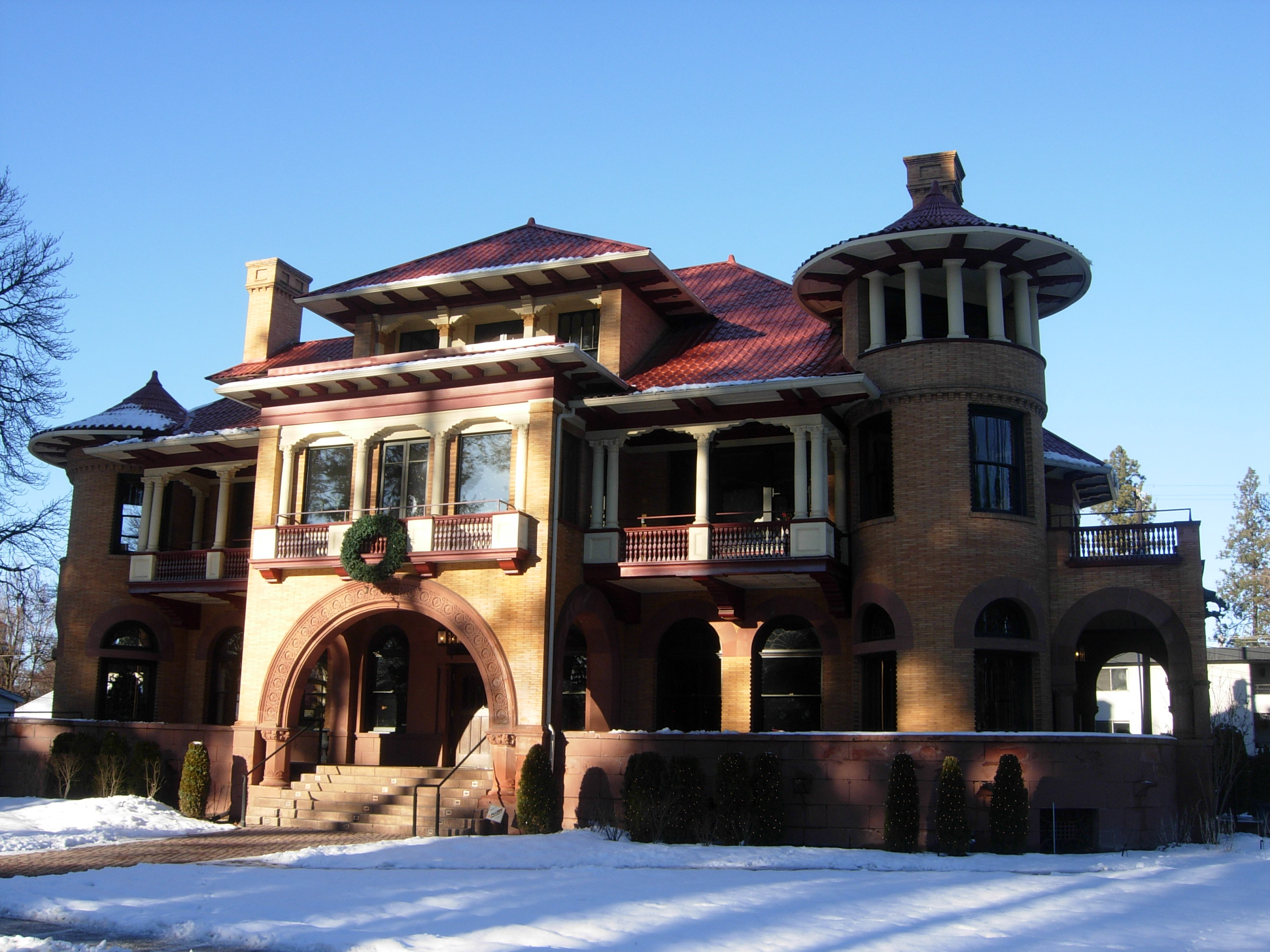
The Patsy Clark Mansion

=== Browne's Addition ===
A National Historic District west of Downtown, Browne's Addition was Spokane's first prestigious address, notable for its old mansions built in Queen Anne and early Craftsman styles, by Spokane's early elite. The area also is home to Coeur d'Alene Park and the Museum of Arts and Culture (MAC). A prominent feature of the MAC is the Campbell House, a turn-of-the-20th-century mansion designed by renowned architect Kirtland Cutter, and built by Amasa Campbell, a local mining magnate. His daughter, Helen Campbell, donated the house to the Eastern Washington Historical Society, which subsequently built a museum on the east lawn. The English Tudor Revival home retains most of its original decor and is a favorite tour destination.

=== Cliff/Cannon ===
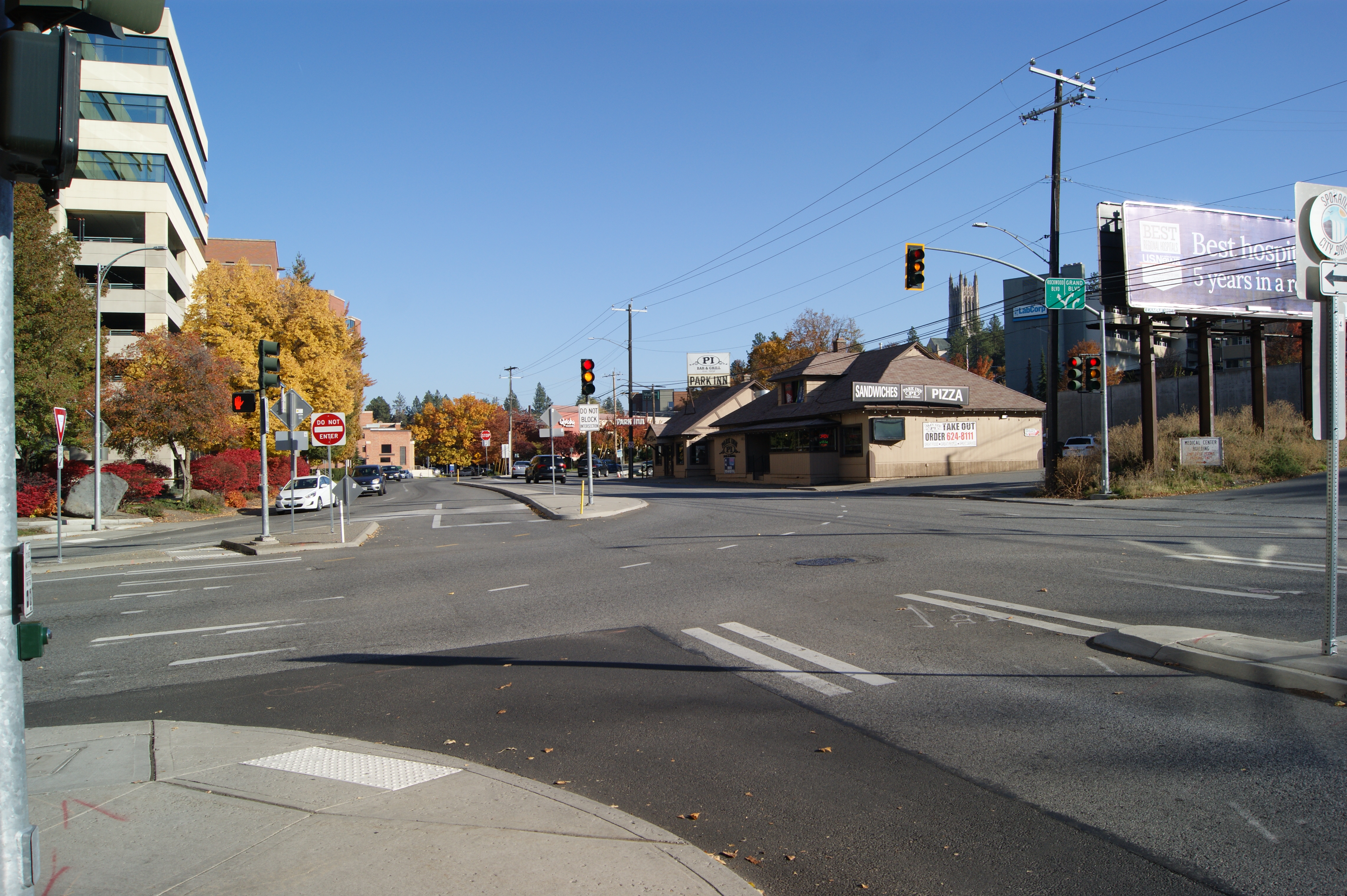
A commercial area of Cliff/Cannon with the Sacred Heart campus on the left, Park Inn on the right, and cathedral in the background

Bounded on the north by Interstate 90, this neighborhood lies between Third and Fourth avenues. In the far northern portion are Sacred Heart Medical Center and Deaconess Hospital, which anchor Spokane's medical district. Sitting between the two hospitals is the historic Lewis and Clark High School. This portion of Cliff/Cannon is separated from the rest of the neighborhood by a steep hill., which in places is a sheer cliff of exposed basalt. Unofficially this hill marks the beginning of the multi-neighborhood region of Spokane known as the South Hill, the transition from the city center to residential areas south side of the city. On the western edge of Cliff/Cannon is another steep hill, this one carved by Latah Creek. The BNSF Railway and Inland Empire Way divide the Latah Valley neighborhood from Cliff/Cannon and the South Hill.

==== Cannon's Addition ====
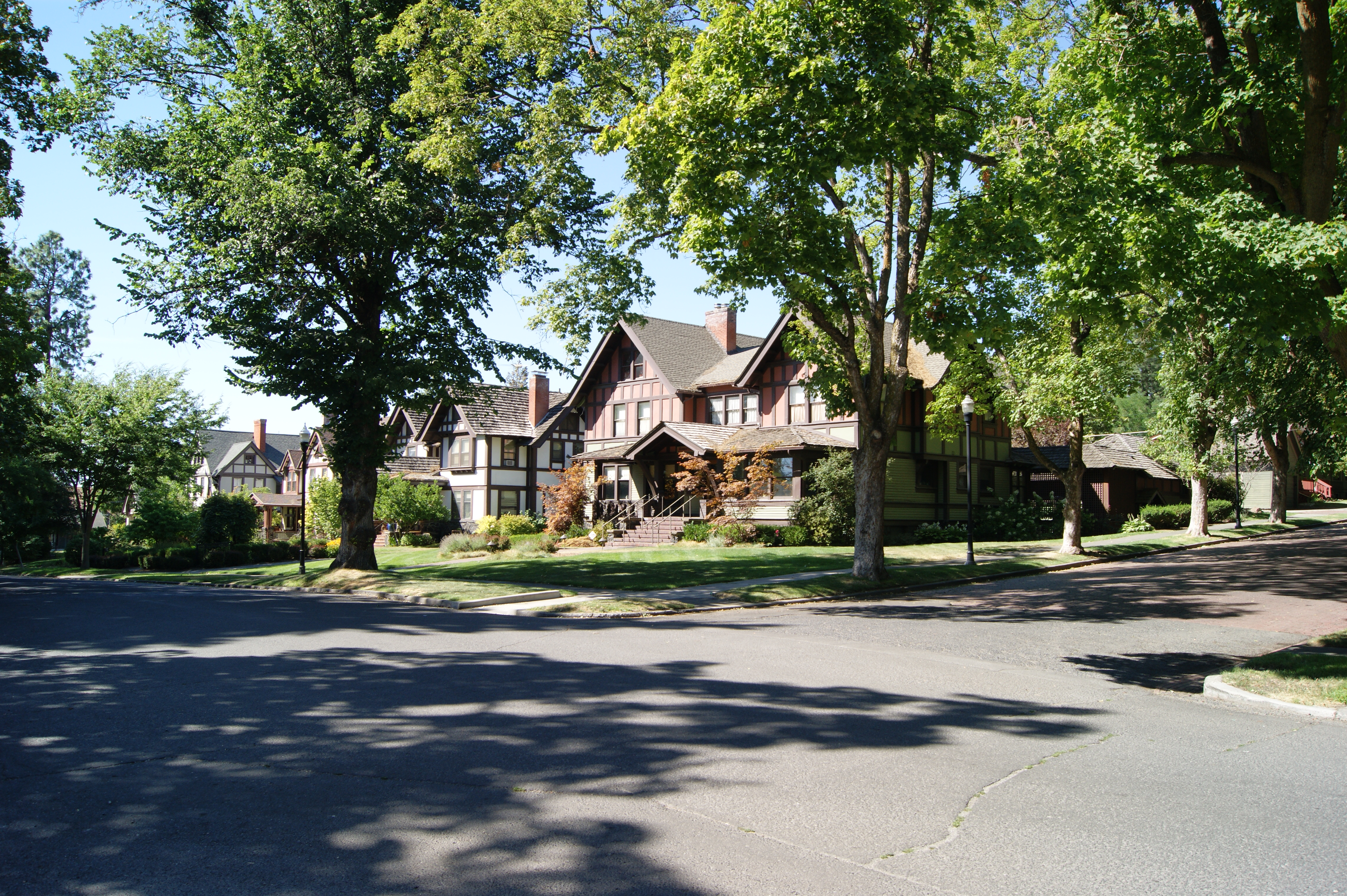
The Comstock-Shadle House in the Ninth Ave. Historic District

Cannon's Addition was named for and originally platted by Anthony McCue Cannon. The need for housing was great after the Fire of 1889 and many architects moved to Spokane to take advantage of the rapid growth. The primary development of Cannon's Addition occurred between 1900 and 1925. The first streets that were developed included Third, Fourth and Fifth Avenue. The northern portion of Cannon's Addition, located closest to the city's downtown core, quickly evolved into an area where the houses of prominent Spokane citizens were constructed. In the original 1883 platting of Cannon's Addition, the streets only went as far south as Tenth; Eleventh, Twelfth, Thirteenth and Fourteenth being added later.

In 1887 J.T. Davis and Henry Brooks opened a brickyard on South Monroe between what would later be known as Cannon Hill Park and Cannon's Addition. The site was rich in clay deposits, and the brickyard was later developed into the Washington Brick, Lime & Sewer Pipe Company. By 1900, Cannon's Addition began to experience increased growth and evolved into a middle class residential neighborhood; over the next fifteen years Spokane grew from a city of 30,000 to a population of 100,000. Once the site of the brickyard had been exhausted of its clay deposits, the company moved its operations elsewhere and by 1909 the site was being developed into residential properties and Cannon Hill Park. After 1920, construction in Cannon's Addition was minimal. The houses constructed during the development of Cannon's Addition ranged in style from the American Foursquare, Tudor Revival and Neoclassical to more modest Craftsman and bungalow style houses.

=== Comstock ===
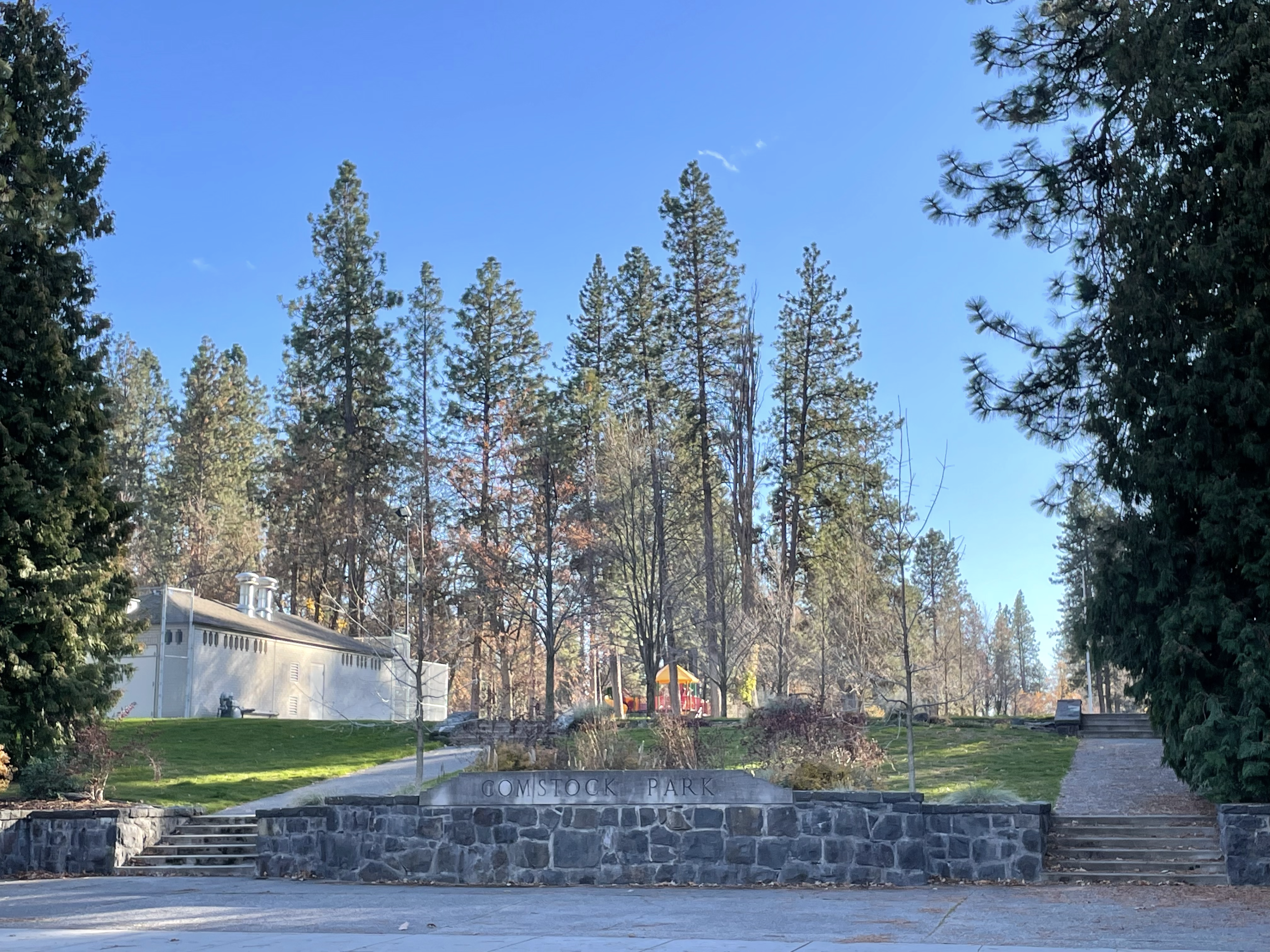
Comstock Park

Comstock is a mostly residential neighborhood south of 29th Avenue and west of Perry Street on the South Hill. It is a mostly residential neighborhood that was developed in phases, initially along streetcar lines, then during the postwar housing boom. It is overwhelmingly single-family residential though there are a few other areas. Manito Shopping Center at 29th and Grand is an important commercial district for the South Hill. Sacajawea Middle School and the Lewis and Clark High School sports fields are located in the center of the neighborhood.

=== Grandview/Thorpe ===
Two valleys mark the north and east sides of this neighborhood: on the east is the valley of Latah Creek and the neighborhood of Latah Valley; on the north is the less steep valley of Garden Springs Creek. I-90 separates Grandview/Thorpe from the West Hills neighborhood, however these two city designated neighborhoods share the unofficial Sunset Hill neighborhood. Grandview refers to the subdivision located in the upper part of the northern half of the neighborhood, which was developed starting in the 1980s. The vista includes much of the north and south sides of Spokane, Downtown Spokane, Krell Hill and the Latah Valley. Thorpe is a road that runs west-southwest from U.S. Route 195 thru a valley immediately south of that subdivision. The area immediately surrounding and to the south of Thorpe Road is less developed than the Grandview section.

=== Latah/Hangman ===
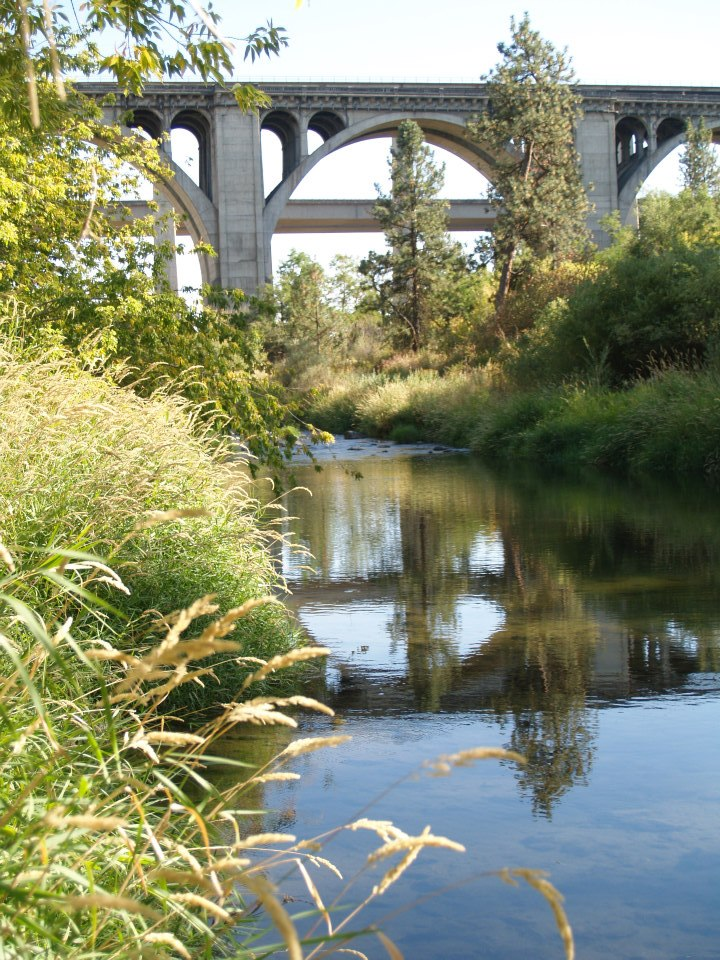
The "high" bridges above High Bridge Park

An expansive neighborhood which stretches from the Riverside Ave. bridge over Latah Creek in the north, technically on the north side of the street grid, to the extreme southern boundary of the City of Spokane. The geography of the neighborhood is divided into two distinct areas: the older Vinegar Flats neighborhood located on the valley floor in the northern portion; and the more recent developments of Qualchan and Eagle Ridge, located to the south on the western hillsides. Due to the expansive area of the neighborhood, combined with its bisection by U.S. Route 195, railroads and Latah Creek, there are smaller, isolated clusters of homes. The valley floor is located at approximately 1,800 feet above sea level and the surrounding hillsides rise to approximately 2,300 feet on the east and 2,200 feet on the west. The mouth of the creek at the Spokane River is located just beyond the neighborhood's northern border. To the east of the creek is a steep hill, undeveloped parkland except for railroad tracks in the northern portion, known as "the bluff". On the west side the hill is not as steep and is more developed. From the west Latah Creek receives Marshall Creek at approximately the intersection of Cheney-Spokane Road and U.S. 195. Garden Springs Creek flows through Latah Valley, entering immediately upstream of the I-90 bridge.

==== Vinegar Flats ====
Located on the valley floor, Vinegar Flats is the longest inhabited area of Latah Valley. Inland Empire Way, which connects the area with the rest of the city, is the main arterial in Vinegar Flats. This area is a patchwork of small homes, empty lots, greenhouses, riparian areas along the creek and city parks. Immediately to the north of the neighborhood are the high bridges over the creek of I-90, Sunset Boulevard, and the BNSF railroad. Located beneath and around those bridges is the aptly named High Bridge Park. The park is mostly undeveloped along the hillside and creek but has a picnic shelter, maintained grass area, and a disc golf course.

==== Qualchan/Eagle Ridge ====
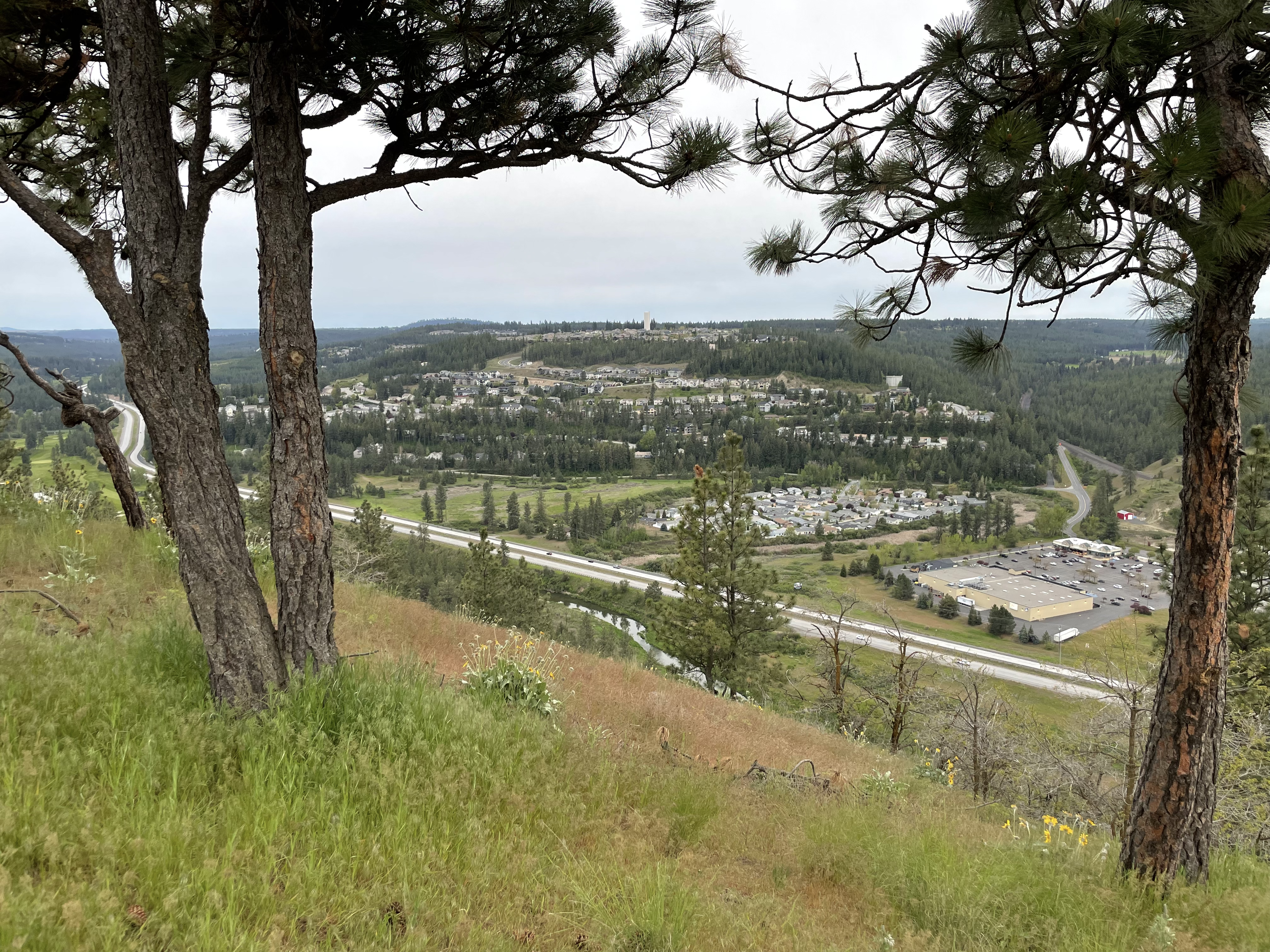
Qualchan (lower) and Eagle Ridge (upper) from across Latah Valley on the South Hill.

This area is composed of two separate but adjacent suburban style developments located along the hills in the southwestern portion of Latah Valley. This is the most modern part of the neighborhood as these two developments are still expanding. An unofficial neighborhood, the boundaries are roughly the intersection of Cheney-Spokane Road and U.S. 195 in the north, the city limits on the south and west, and U.S. 195 on the east. At the northern end is the commercial center of Latah Valley with several businesses including a grocery store, gas station, restaurants, bank and other small shops.

=== Lincoln Heights ===
Lincoln Heights is a middle-class neighborhood that occupies most of the eastern side of the South Hill, from Southeast Boulevard (Perry Street, north of 29th Avenue) to the city limits. 37th Avenue is the southern border of the neighborhood, which stretches north to a ridge that overlooks the valley of the Spokane River. The neighborhood is centered on the intersection of 29th and Regal. The area around the intersection is one of the major commercial districts on the South Hill. Apartment complexes are common around the intersection, whereas the rest of the neighborhood is dominated by single family homes.

=== Manito/Cannon Hill ===
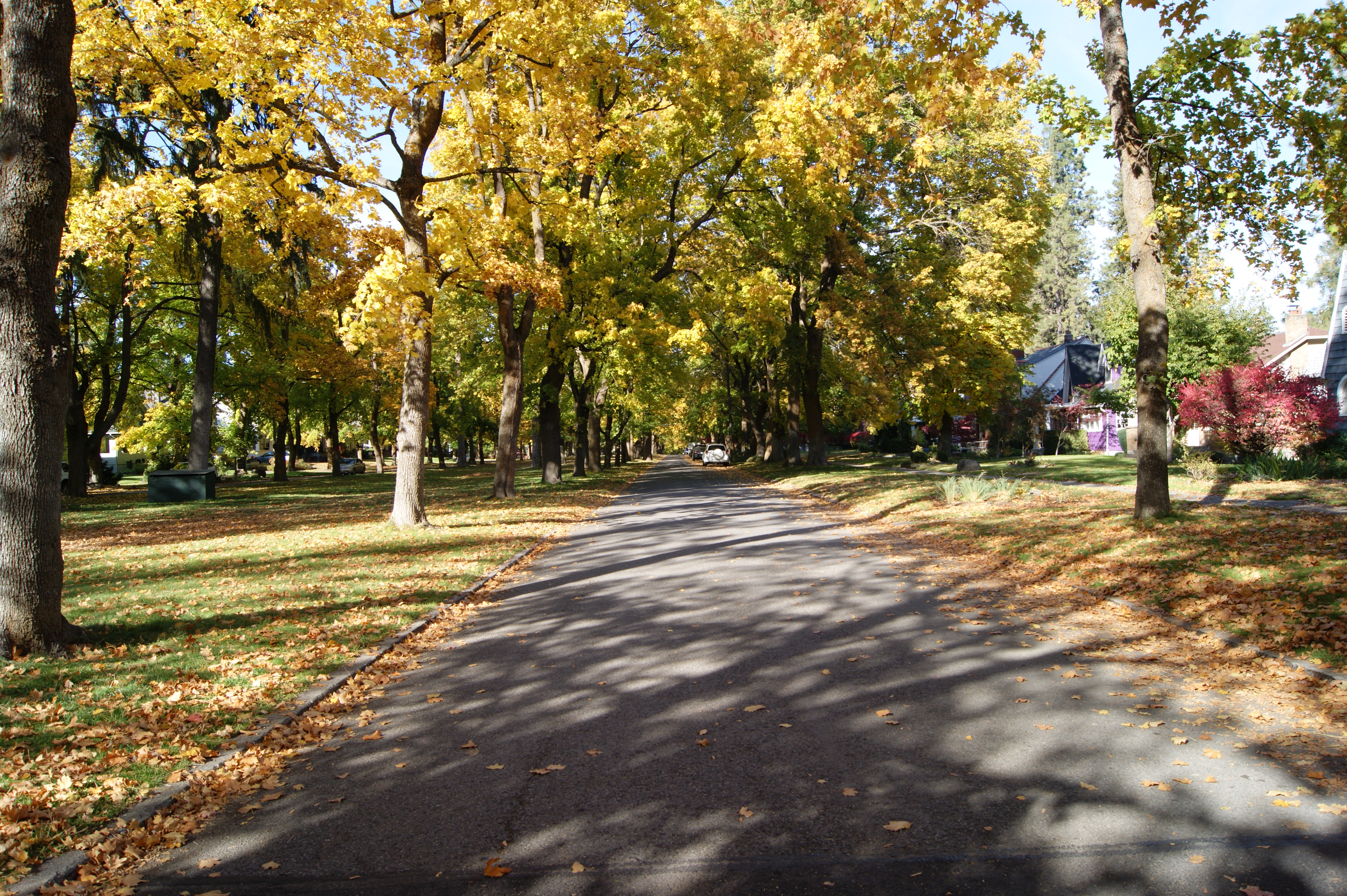
The Manito Blvd. parkway at 29th Ave. looking northbound

The boundaries of this area are considered to be approximately from Arthur Street to Lincoln Street in the east–west direction, and from 14th Avenue to 37th Avenue in the north–south direction. Best described as the area immediately surrounding Manito and Cannon Hill Park, on which it is centered, this neighborhood covers a fairly large area. At one time, the park was a zoo with a number of "exotic" animals calling it home. Exhibits included an owl barn, penguins, and large cats of various species. The neighborhood feeds many local elementary schools, including Wilson, Roosevelt, Hutton, and Jefferson. There is also the Cataldo Catholic School one block north of Cannon Hill Park. Most elementary students move on to Sacajawea Middle School and then Lewis and Clark High School. This neighborhood is populated mostly by middle-class families and features homes from many eras, from Mid-Century Modern to Victorian to Arts & Crafts bungalow-style homes. Manito and Cannon Hill Park each have a boulevard running nearby which features many of the remaining Craftsman bungalow-style homes built, in some cases, as early as 1904.

=== Peaceful Valley ===
A quaint, residential neighborhood descending into the Spokane River Gorge just west of downtown, Peaceful Valley is now undergoing change due to upscale development in the surrounding neighborhoods of Browne's Addition, Kendall Yards and West Downtown. Still, the Valley remains one of the quietest, greenest, most affordable neighborhoods, within easy walking distance of the city's core. A few luxurious riverfront homes mix with a greater number of small bungalows and apartments, some of which are tucked below the Maple Street Bridge. People's Park and Latah Creek bound the neighborhood to the west. In many ways, Peaceful Valley seems little changed since the film Benny & Joon was filmed here in 1993.

=== Rockwood ===
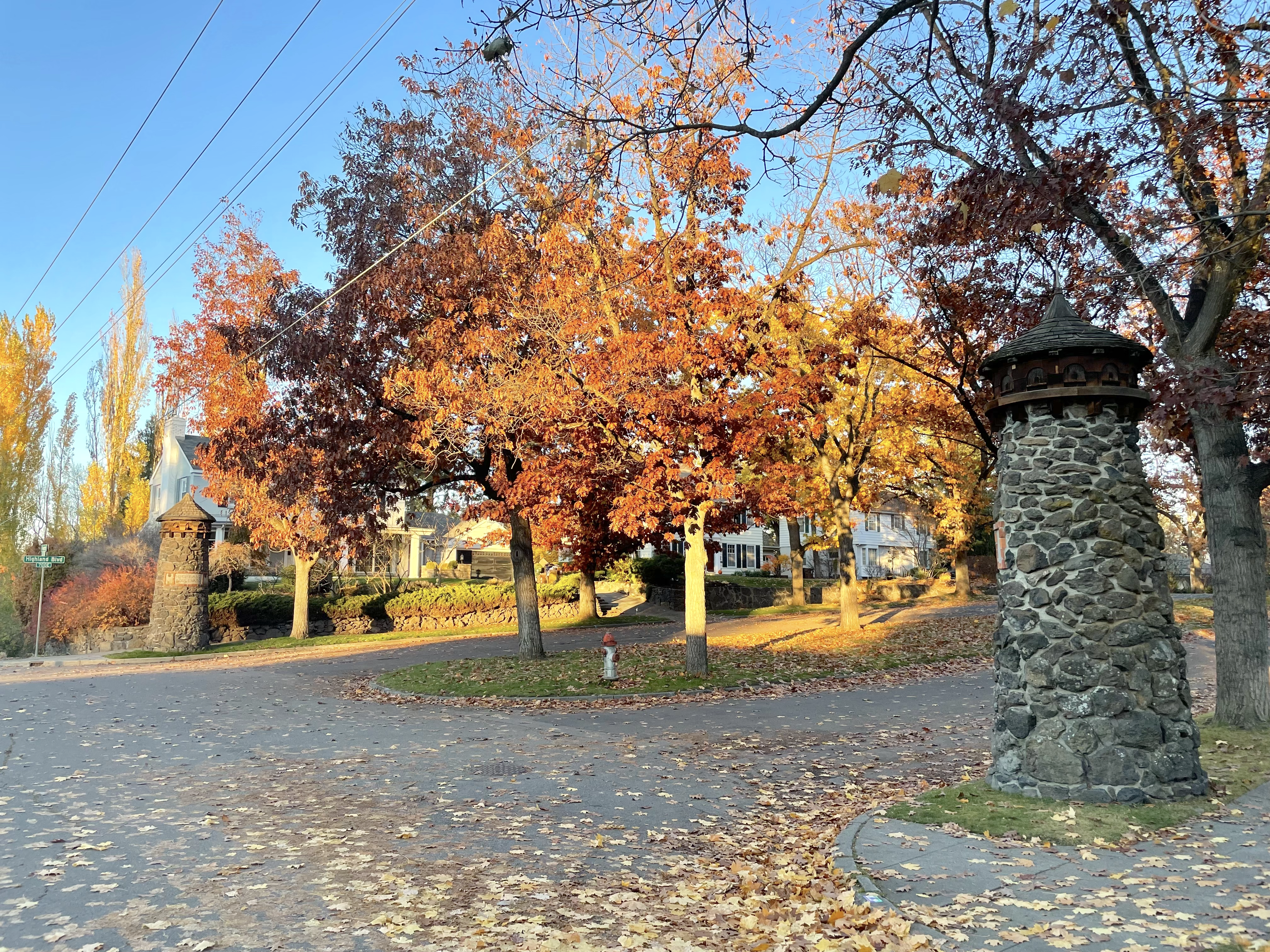
Stone towers marking the entrance to the Rockwood Historic District on Highland Boulevard

An older residential neighborhood with many homes on the Spokane Register of Historic Places, Rockwood is part of the master plan of Spokane commissioned by the Olmsted Brothers, sons of Frederick Law Olmsted, one of the designers of Central Park in Manhattan. The Olmsted Brothers recommended curving streets with a central boulevard winding through the heart of the neighborhood. Many street names in the neighborhood help illustrate the topographical profile of Rockwood. Along with the namesake boulevard, streets such as Overbluff, Upper Terrace, Highland, Plateau, Pinecrest, and Woodcliff all include a reference to their geographic setting. Half of Rockwood is perched on a winding hillside, where the valley carved by the Spokane River rises rather abruptly to the elevation of the Columbia Plateau. In places the elevation change is so dramatic that streets are cut off; for example, on Perry Street a staircase, rather than paved road, connects Overbluff with 20th Avenue. Above the hillside the terrain is relatively flat. This change in elevation results in numerous basalt outcroppings within the neighborhood. Along with the exposed rocks this old neighborhood is full of mature trees, making Rockwood a very literal street name. There are many large homes in the neighborhood, especially along Rockwood Boulevard and the surrounding hillsides. The rest of the neighborhood is generally composed of smaller single-family homes. Notable exceptions include the Spanish Colonial Hutton Elementary School at 24th Ave. and Plateau Rd., the Gothic Revival St. John's Cathedral at 12th Avenue and Grand Boulevard, and the business district stretching north, from the cathedral, along Grand.

=== Southgate ===
Located in the extreme south east of the city, it is bounded on the north by 37th Avenue, on the west by Perry Street, and the city limits to the south and east. Southgate is experiencing growth in both population and area due to its location. Development extends beyond the city limits, and the city of Spokane is slowly annexing those areas. Annexations expanding the Southgate neighborhood have occurred in 1991, 2001 and 2006. Regal Street is the main commercial district in the neighborhood, particularly around 43rd Avenue. Ferris High School, which serves the eastern portion of the South Hill, is located in Southgate at Regal and 37th. Ferris completed a massive renovation in 2014, but it was formerly a stylistic anomaly in Spokane. Ferris was made up of multiple buildings surrounding a central courtyard that were connected only by covered walkways. Spokane's climate during the winter is cold and snowy, which make crossing an outdoor campus between classes unpleasant. Southgate is arguably Spokane's television capitol. KREM and KSPS-TV, the CBS and PBS affiliates respectively, are headquartered in Southgate. The Ferris High School baseball field is all that separates the two stations. KHQ-TV, the NBC affiliate, was located directly across Regal Street from KREM until 2001 when it moved downtown to create an all digital facility. Along with the television studios numerous transmitters and towers are located within the neighborhood.

=== Riverside ===
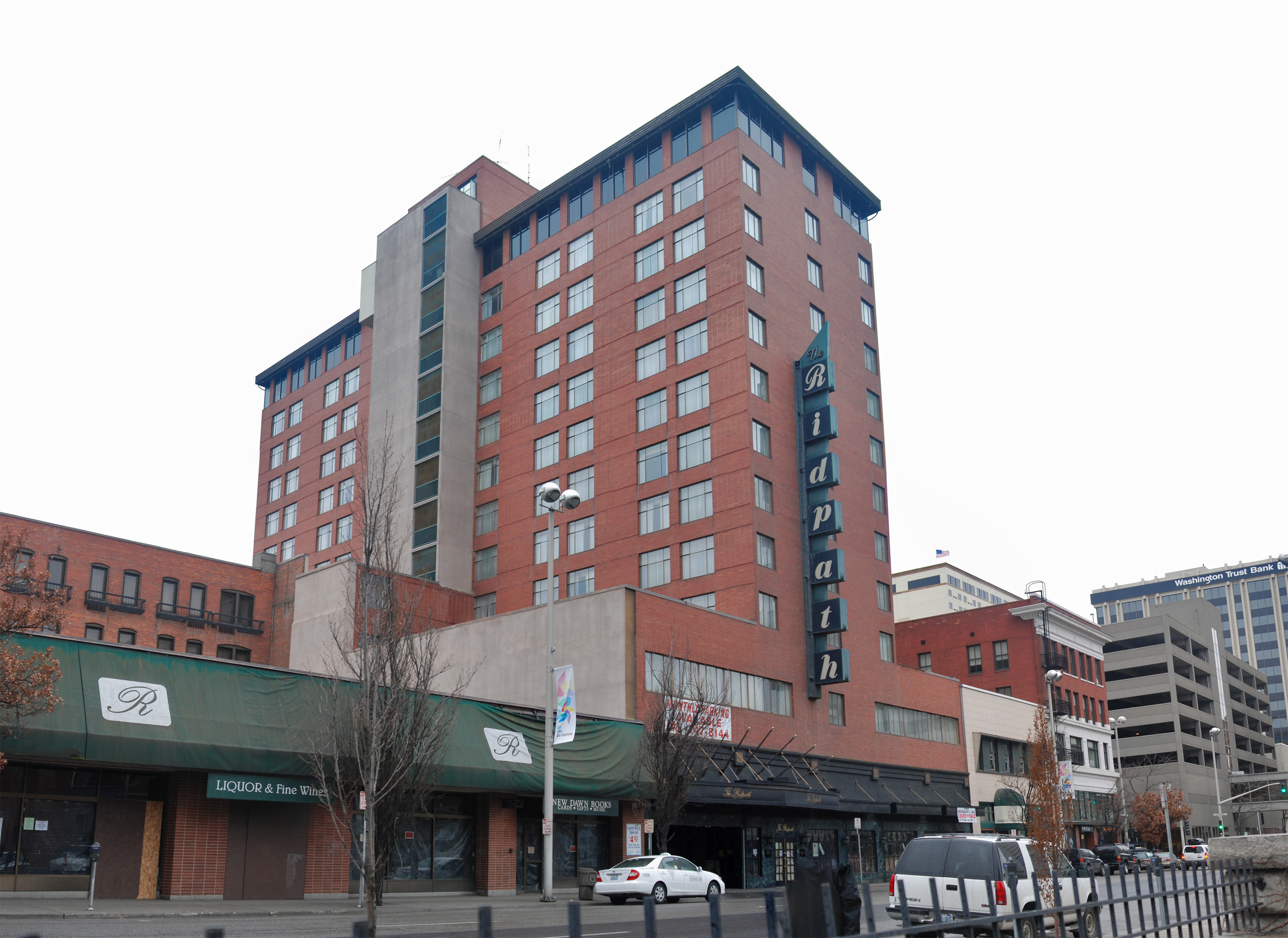
The Ridpath Club Apartments

Spokane's central business core boasts recently revitalized shopping, housing and entertainment, with major projects recently completed and more underway. As with most river cities, Spokane's history revolves around its river, which tumbles through downtown in a series of rapids and falls known as Spokane Falls. Along the river is Riverfront Park (site of the 1974 World's Fair), the First Interstate Center for the Arts, the newly remodeled and expanded Convention Center, and the River Park Square shopping mall. Nearby one finds the Davenport Hotel, the growing Davenport Arts District, numerous shops, pubs and restaurants, and much new urban housing on the way, displacing many of the low-income residents and businesses that dominated downtown during the 1980s and '90s. The Riverside Avenue Historic District is within this neighborhood.

==== Downtown ====
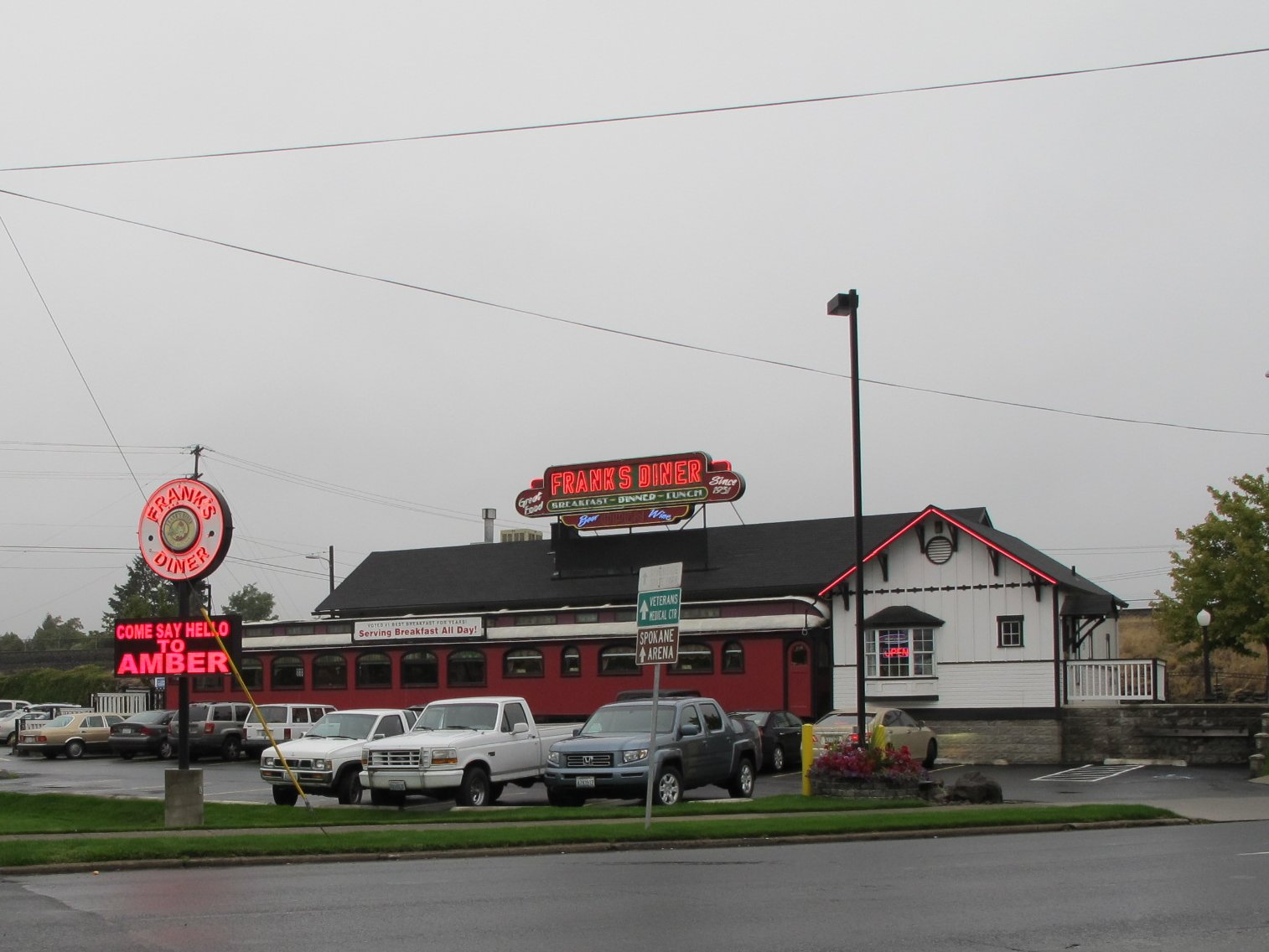
Frank's Diner

Downtown is home to Spokane's city and county government offices, most notably the Spokane County Courthouse, built in the style of a French chateau, featuring large turrets and spires. A similarly historic structure houses the Spokane Athletic Club, housed in a Georgian-style building designed by famed Spokane architect Kirtland Cutter. The Club sits just across Riverside Avenue from the Cathedral of Our Lady of Lourdes, seat of the Catholic Church in the Inland Northwest, and just across Monroe Street from the Thomas S. Foley United States Courthouse. The recently rebuilt Monroe Street Bridge, over Spokane Falls, is a notable symbol of the city, long featured in the city logo. Nearby is the modern main branch of the Spokane Public Library, with its expansive views of the Spokane River. Just down Monroe Street is the Fox Theater, an art-deco movie theater that recently underwent a multimillion-dollar renovation to become the new home of the Spokane Symphony. At the north end of Riverfront Park is the 12,000 seat Spokane Arena, home to the Spokane Chiefs Hockey Club and Spokane Shock Arena Football Club. In addition to numerous local and regional events, the Arena hosts events such as NCAA March Madness, numerous big-name concerts, and in 2007 and 2010, the U.S. Figure Skating Championships. Across Mallon Avenue from the Arena is the Flour Mill, a converted structure that once produced flour in abundance but now houses a variety of offices, shops, and restaurants.

=== West Hills ===
The West Hills neighborhood is located between Latah Creek and the Spokane River on the east and the city limits on the West. The topography of this neighborhood is very rugged, and as such it is essentially divided into two separate neighborhoods. Indian Canyon, the namesake of the public Indian Canyon Golf Course, has a 240-foot vertical drop, carved by a small creek. That creek joins Latah Creek within feet of Latah joining the Spokane River. Immediately north of Indian Canyon are large, old cemeteries that stretch from the river to beyond the city limits in some places. North of those is the new, in terms of development, section of West Hills.

==== Sunset Hill ====
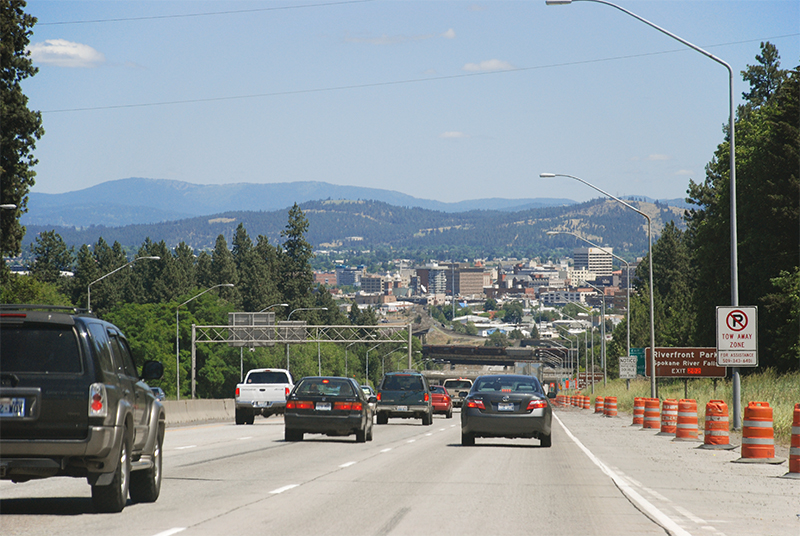
View from I-90 on Sunset Hill

South of Indian Canyon is the Sunset Hill neighborhood. Sunset Hill is an old neighborhood, thanks to its proximity to the city center, especially when compared to the rest of West Hills. Located immediately west of Latah Creek from Browne's Addition, near to the east of Spokane International Airport, Sunset Hill features older neighborhoods with smaller houses, as well as new subdivisions; however, some of the lower parts of the hill are very poorly zoned areas with dirt roads, grass lots and very small, dilapidated homes. Sunset Hill is bisected by I-90 and Sunset Boulevard, which represents one of the remaining sections of the old U.S. Route 2, once the main road between Spokane and Seattle prior to the completion of Interstate 90. In fact, I-90 features one of the most striking views of the city and Mt. Spokane behind it in the distance, as seen by travelers heading east along the freeway upon reaching the crest of the Hill on their way down into the city. John A. Finch Arboretum, an expansive park filled with a variety of tree species and wildlife, is located on Sunset Hill. Those highways are located in a valley carved by Garden Springs Creek which runs down the middle of the arboretum. The grade carved by the creek is the least steep route from the Spokane River valley onto the Columbia Plateau, and is conveniently located just west of the city center. Interstate 90 is the city's official division between the West Hills and Grandview/Thorpe neighborhood, though the unofficial Sunset Hill neighborhood straddles that division.

== District 3 (Northwest) ==
=== Audubon/Downriver ===
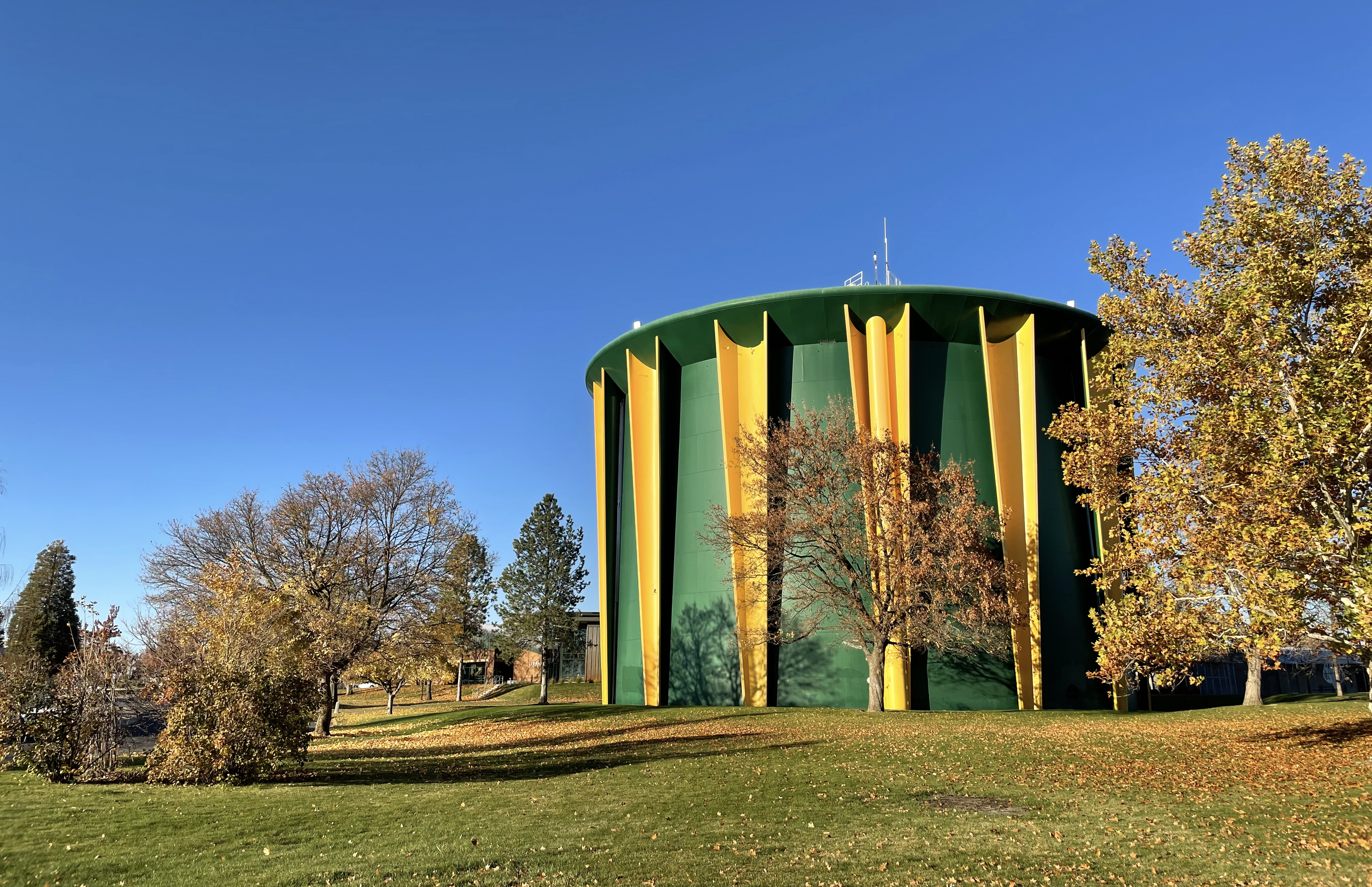
The Shadle Water Tower in Shadle Park

A residential neighborhood composed of post-war houses in the northwest of the city, it features a large recreation and sports complex known as Shadle Park, as well as being home to Shadle Park High School. There is also the historical Drumheller Springs, the site of the first American-style school built in the Oregon Territory, circa 1830. Local Indians were taught here by Chief Garry, a chief of the middle Spokane people who preached Christianity and peace among the Native Americans that inhabited the Inland Northwest. The site is now managed by the Spokane Parks and Recreation Department as a natural area, and has been adopted by the Upper Columbia United Tribes, for whom it is a traditional campground. A trail that once led from downtown Spokane all the way to Canada still runs through the preserve.

The neighborhood's name comes from two areas within its bounds, Audubon Park and the Downriver area, so named for being located downriver from downtown.

=== Balboa/South Indian Trail ===
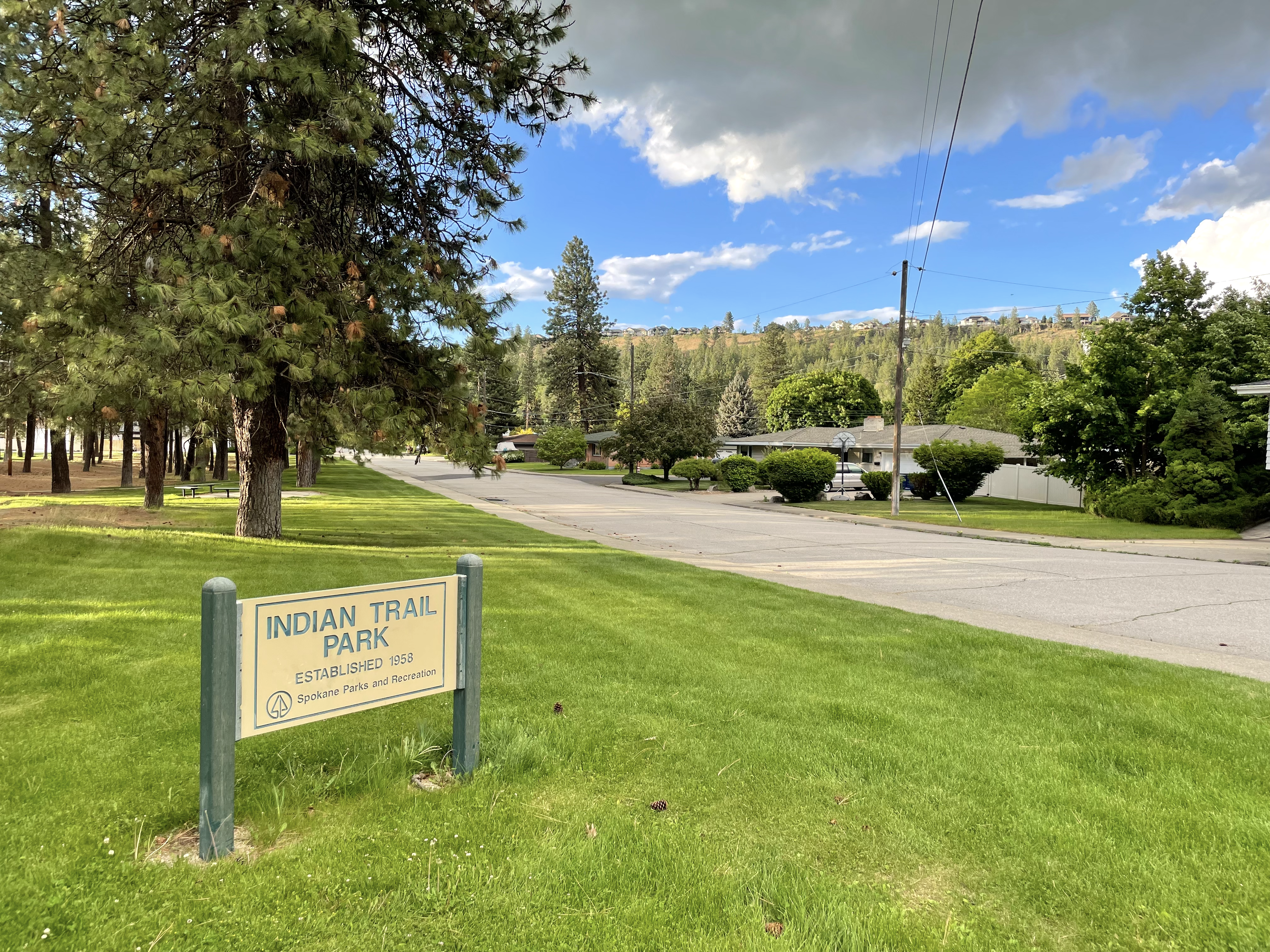
Indian Trail Park showing the urban forest of ponderosa pines

An arterial runs along what was once a major Native American thoroughfare in the northwestern part of the city, along the edge of the Spokane River Gorge. Today, the area is dominated by suburban homes, many of which were built from the 1960s to the early 1980s. Stands of native Ponderosa Pine cover the hills and flatlands surrounding this neighborhood.

=== Emerson/Garfield ===
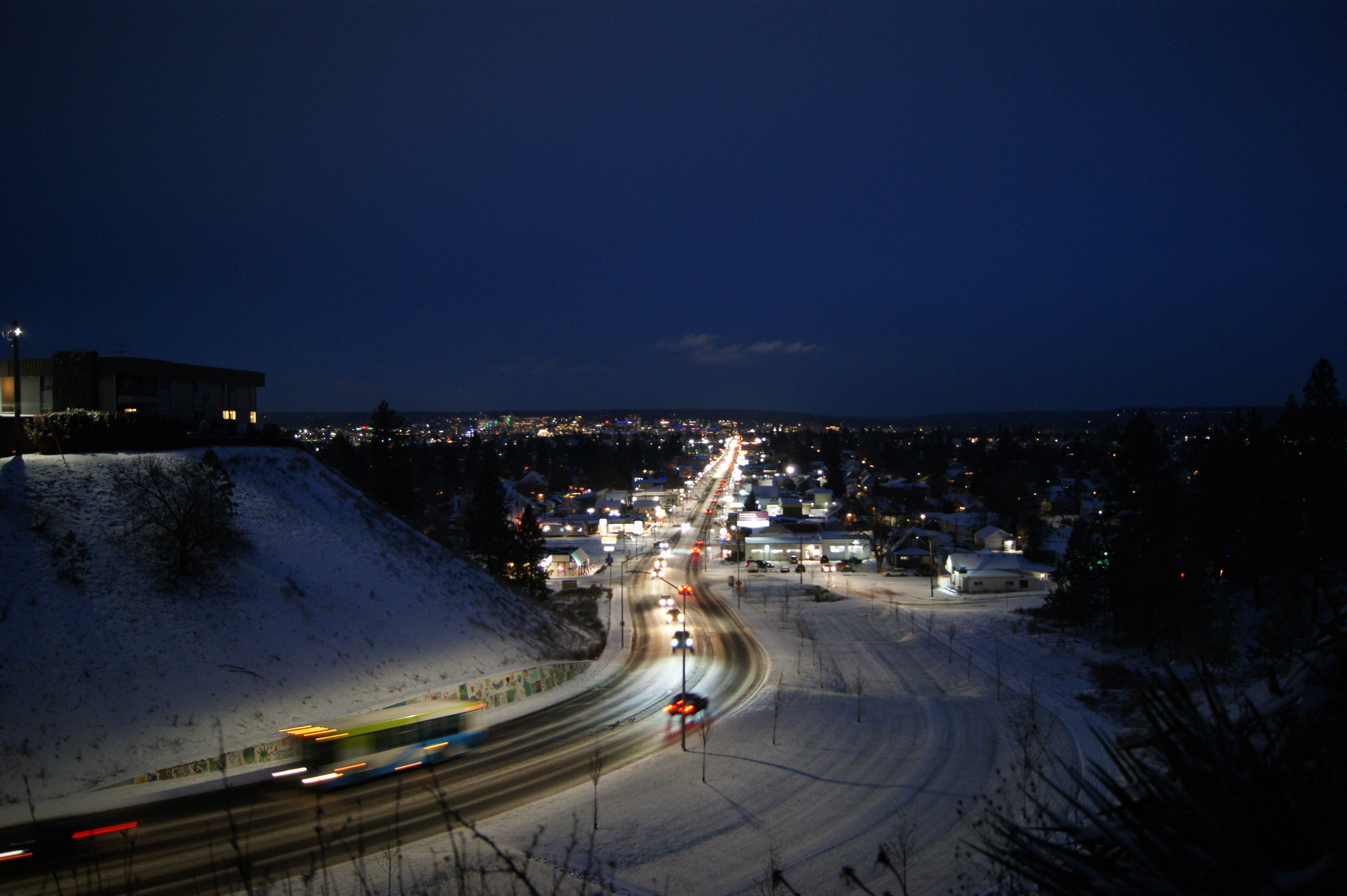
Monroe Street corridor and surrounding Emerson-Garfield neighborhood from Glass Avenue overlook

Originally named in honor of two elementary schools (historic Emerson was razed in 1981; the site is now Emerson Park), the Emerson-Garfield Neighborhood]is a predominantly residential area consisting largely of early 20th century Craftsman-style homes. Its irregular southern border falls in close proximity to centrally located landmarks like the Lincoln Center, Spokane Civic Theatre and Spokane Arena. To the east it is bordered by North Division, a commercial arterial, and its western edge is roughly delineated by North Belt. The North Hill Neighborhood lies directly to its north. The neighborhood is bisected by the North Monroe business corridor, which specializes in antique, retro and vintage retailers. Census data indicates that the population in recent decades has remained fairly constant at around 9,500 residents. In addition to Emerson Park, the neighborhood is also home to Corbin Park and the Corbin Park Historic District.

==== Corbin Park ====
Located two miles north of downtown, Corbin Park is one of two local historic districts in Spokane. The site, once belonging to the Washington-Idaho Fair Association, was the city's first fairgrounds, and included a central racetrack. Horses, bicycles, and people raced around the oval track while spectators cooled themselves with lemonade. The fair and the races lasted from 1887 to 1890 and the races continued until 1899 when the owner of the land, D. C. Corbin, razed the grandstand, and gave the sixteen city blocks to the City of Spokane for one dollar. The 1899 plat of the Corbin Park Addition included the former racetrack as a park in the center of the residential district. In 1916 a formal park design was prepared by the Olmsted Brothers, Landscape Architects of Brookline, Massachusetts. Today, most of the park has been adapted for current use as a basketball court, tennis courts (2) and playground area.

=== Five Mile Prairie ===
A cliff-ringed butte 5 miles (8.0 km) north of downtown Spokane, Five Mile is one of Spokane's newer residential areas. Homes here tend to be more costly due to the views, and the fact that the area lies within the Mead School District. Sky Prairie Park, Prairie View Elementary School and the Five Mile Grange are community hubs. The butte's north and west slopes remain wild and forested. Although no retail business districts exist atop the hill, it overlooks the commercial centers of Francis Avenue to the south, Indian Trail Road to the west, Wandermere to the northeast and North Division to the east. Mead High School is 1 mile (1.6 km) north of the hill. Holy Family hospital lies 2 miles (3.2 km) southeast.

=== North Hill ===
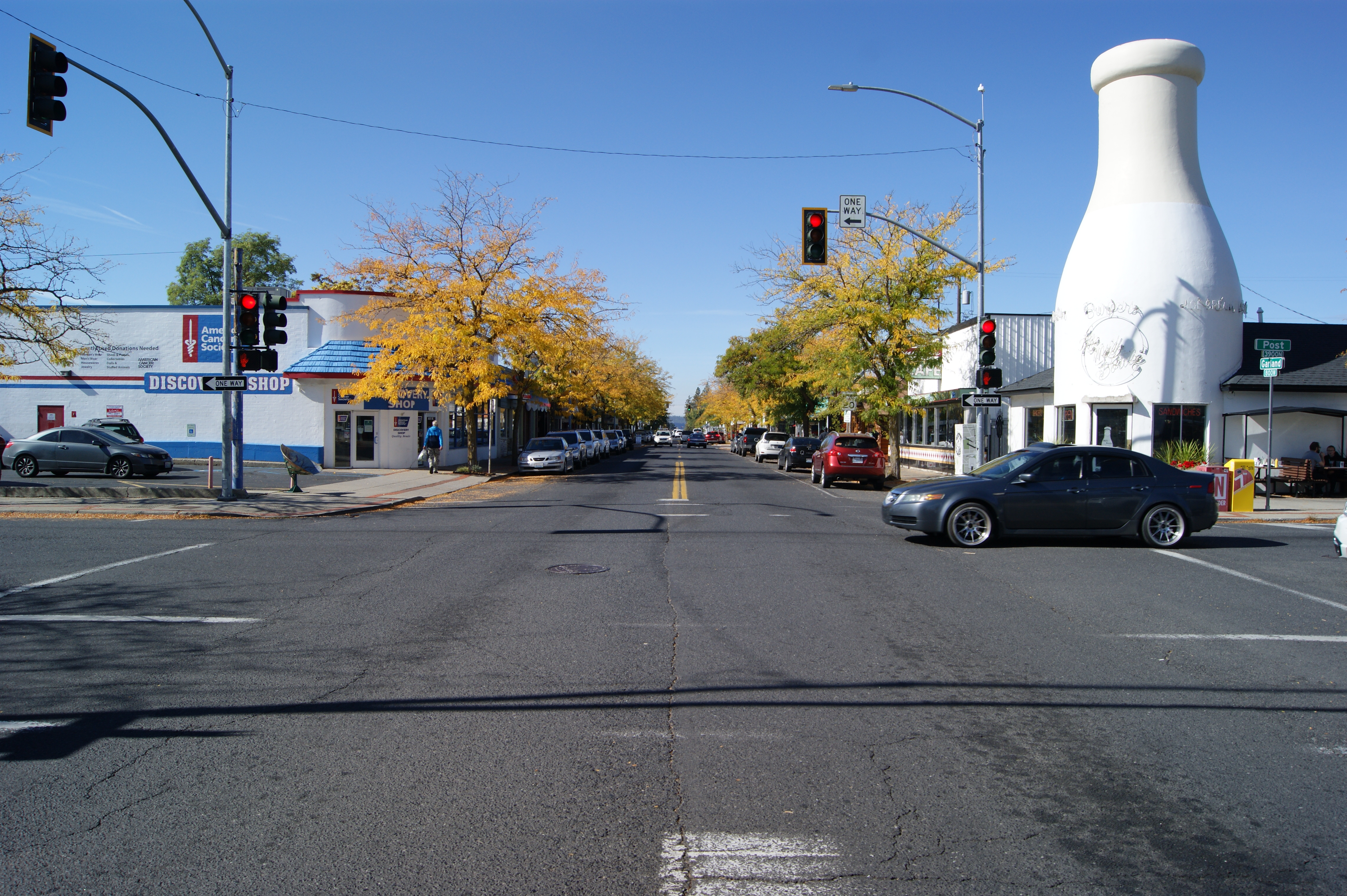
Garland Business District

==== Garland ====
The Garland Historical District is a mid-20th century neighborhood located 2 miles (3.2 km) north of Downtown. The area (also known as the Garland Business District) is considered a walkable community with many local shops, pubs, and restaurants lining Garland Avenue, which runs east–west through the district. Notable businesses and attractions include Ferguson's Café, the Garland Theater (a popular independent movie theater), and the Blue Door Theater, which bills itself as "The Inland Northwest's Premier Improv Company". Fergusons Café, which first opened in the 1930s, was featured in three movies: Vision Quest, Benny & Joon and Why Would I Lie?. On the night of September 25, 2011, the Milk Bottle restaurant, and the historical Ferguson's Café, located next door, were heavily damaged in a fire. Fire investigators believe the fire started in a walkway between the two restaurants.

=== North Indian Trail ===
A suburban area in the northwestern corner of the Spokane city limits, North Indian Trail features homes overlooking the Spokane River Gorge. The area first began to develop in the 1970s with single-family subdivisions, and now features duplexes, apartment dwellings, and commercial areas. A shopping complex at the intersection of Indian Trail Road and Barnes Road serves surrounding communities including Five Mile Prairie, Rutter Parkway, Seven Mile and the rural areas beyond.

=== West Central ===
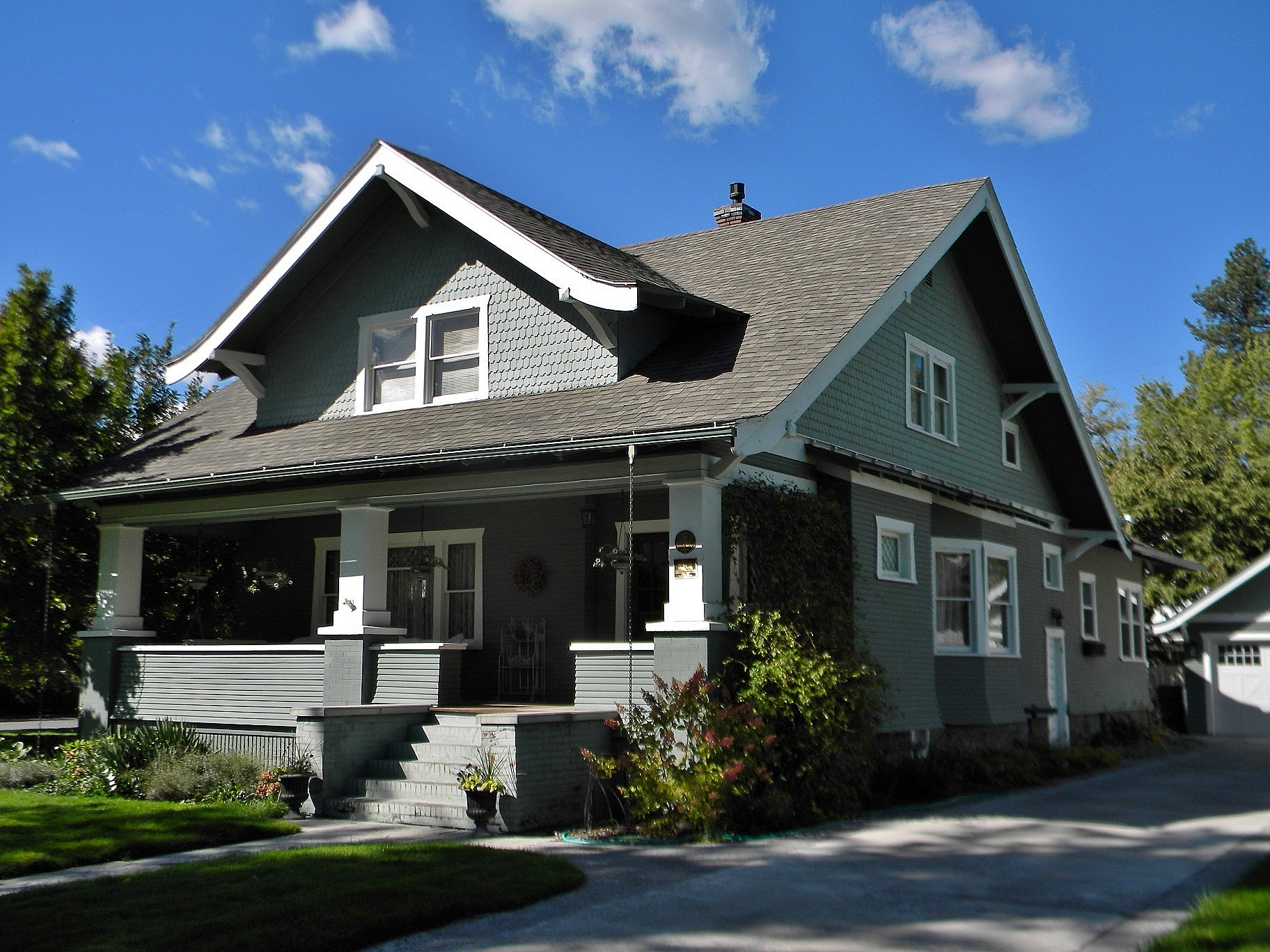
The Canfield House, a Craftsman fairly typical of the neighborhood

This neighborhood includes Washington State's largest historic district listed on the National Register of Historic Places in 2006, Nettleton's Addition. Like much of Spokane, West Central suffered from mid-century suburban flight, but 2000 Census data indicated a reversing trend. In "Socio-Economic Changes in Spokane County Census Tracts from 1990 and 2000," the Spokane-Kootenai Real Estate Research Committee noted "... a distinct decline in poverty levels ..." in West Central. More recently, discussion of Kendall Yards, a large-scale development bordering the southern edge of West Central, has sparked renewed interest in this historic neighborhood.

== See also ==
- Hutton Settlement District
