= Diocese of Spokane =

Diocese of Spokane may refer to:

- Roman Catholic Diocese of Spokane
- Episcopal Diocese of Spokane
