= Cathedral of St. John the Evangelist (Spokane, Washington) =

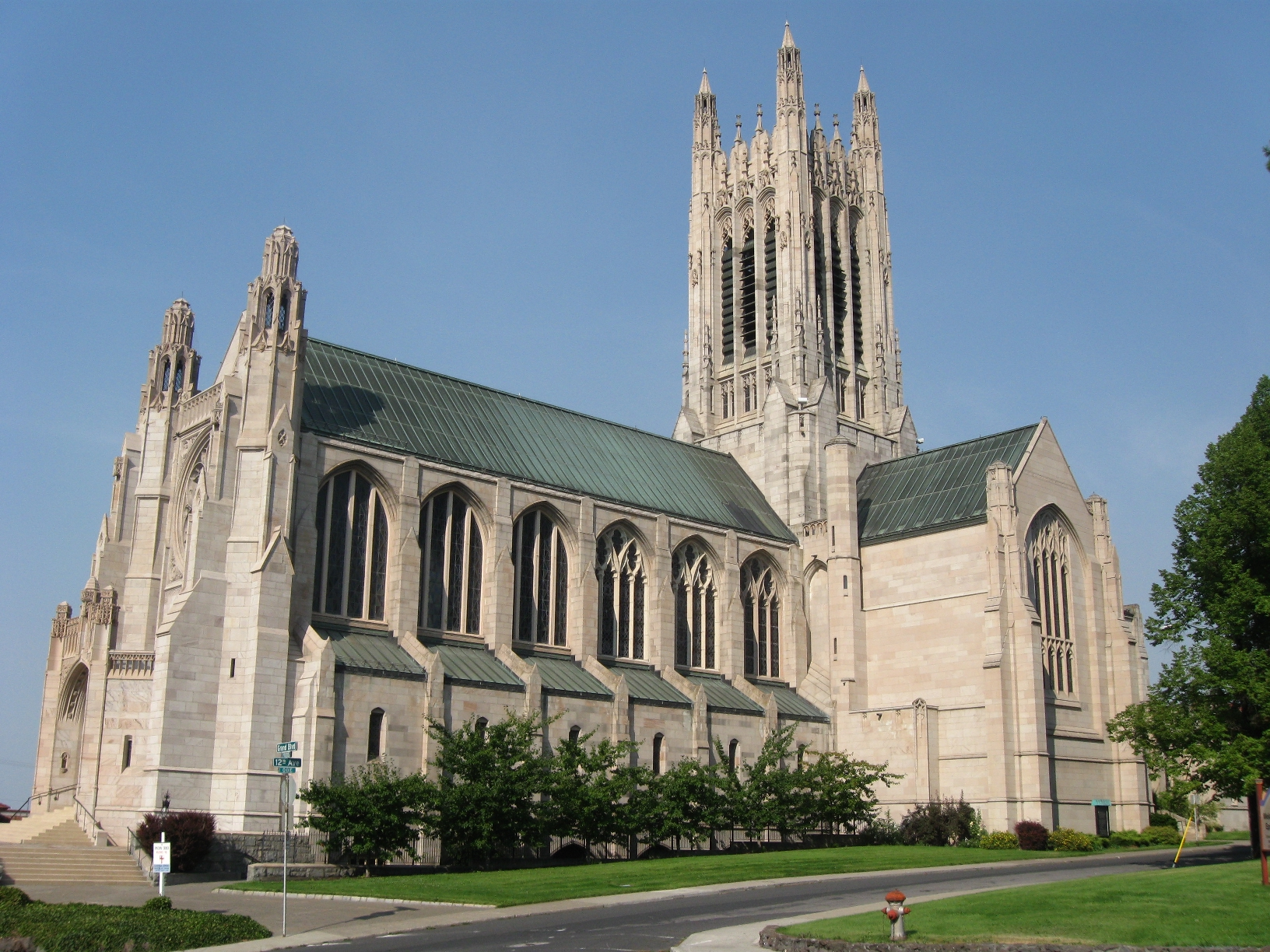
- View from southwest in 2009

- Location within Washington (state) Location within the United States
- 47.645°N 117.41°W
- Location: 127 E 12th Avenue; Spokane, Washington
- Country: United States
- Denomination: Episcopal
- Website: www.stjohns-cathedral.org

History
- Founded: 1929
- Founder: Edward Makin Cross

Architecture
- Architect: Harold C. Whitehouse
- Style: Gothic Revival
- Groundbreaking: 1924; 102 years ago
- Completed: 1954; 72 years ago

Specifications
- Capacity: 1000
- Length: 257 ft (78 m)
- Height: 180 feet (55 m)
- Materials: Sandstone

Administration
- Diocese: Episcopal Diocese of Spokane

Clergy
- Bishop: The Rt. Rev. Gretchen Rehberg
- Dean: The Very Rev. Heather VanDeventer

The Cathedral of St. John the Evangelist in Spokane, Washington, is the cathedral church of the Episcopal Diocese of Spokane. Three Spokane parishes—All Saints Cathedral, St. Peter's, and St. James—merged on October 20, 1929 to form the cathedral. The construction of the building, however, began four years prior in 1925, and was structurally completed in less than a generation under the supervision of founding architect Harold C. Whitehouse (of the Spokane firm of Whitehouse & Price). It is located in the Rockwood neighborhood on Spokane's South Hill.

The cathedral reported 638 members in 2015 and 355 members in 2023. Plate and pledge income reported for the congregation in 2024 was $628,169. Average Sunday Attendance (ASA) in 2024 was 151 persons.

The cathedral is open Monday through Friday, 9:00 a.m to 4:00 p.m. Guided tours are often available on Fridays, 11 a.m to 2 p.m. On Sundays, guided tours usually are available immediately after the last morning worship service. The tour usually lasts around 45 minutes.

== History ==
In 1924, shortly after the arrival of the newly arrived bishop, Edward Makin Cross, church member Harold C. Whitehouse was hired to design a cathedral on the South Hill to succeed the All Saints Cathedral downtown. for a vacant plot of land, the former home site of early prominent Spokanite, Francis H. Cook. The location of the cathedral is at an elevation of approximately 2,160 feet (660 m) above sea level. Grand Boulevard, which passes diagonally in front of the cathedral as seen in the image above, begins its steep descent into Downtown Spokane directly in front of the cathedral. Its location at the crest of a hill, which rises more than 300 feet above downtown, makes the cathedral a visible landmark from much of downtown and areas to the north.

After touring Europe for design inspiration, Whitehouse settled on using the English Gothic style with some French influences. The first stage of construction was creating the nave leading to the high altar. This was completed in late 1929, allowing for the first Eucharistic services to be held. Ten days later, the 1929 stock market crash occurred, which led to a halt in construction for almost two decades. Construction resumed in 1948, and the chancel, sanctuary, transepts, and Gothic tower were completed by 1954.

The first Dean of the cathedral was Richard Coombs, who relocated to Spokane in 1956 from Saint Paul's Episcopal Church in Salinas, California.

== Features ==
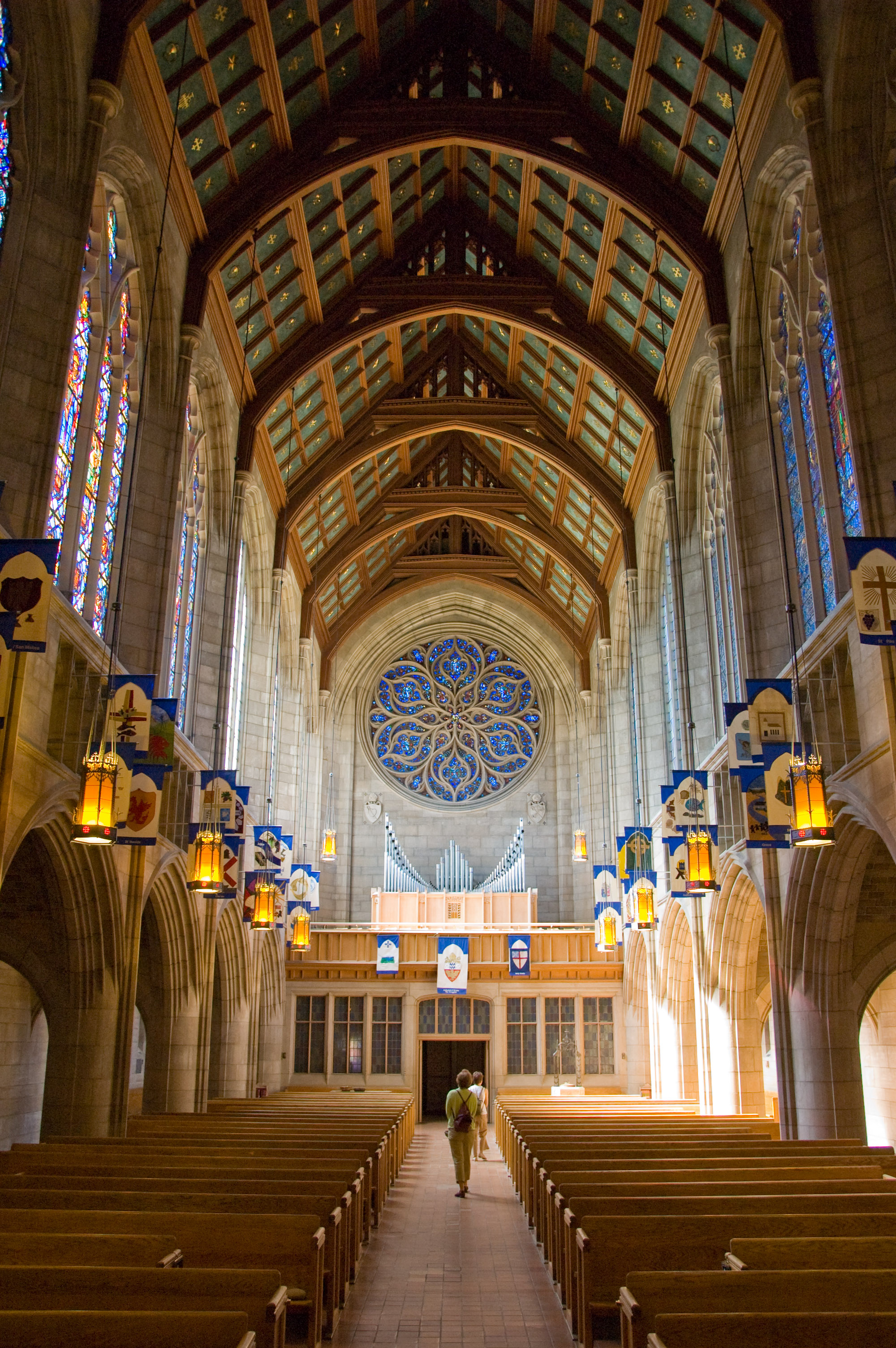
The cathedral interior and nave

The structure is built entirely of cut stone. It is a solid masonry construction featuring a sandstone exterior quarried near Tacoma, Washington, sandstone interior from Idaho, and some Indiana limestone. The building contains no structural wood or steel.

Bishop Cross Tower was named to honor the cathedral's founder. It was cast and installed by the English firm of John Taylor & Sons and houses a 49-bell carillon, one of the few in the Northwest United States. Carillon concerts are played at Sunday services, at times of religious and civic festivals, and other times as announced. The carillon is best heard from outside on the Cathedral Close (nearby grounds).

=== Interior design ===
The carvings, as well as the stained glass windows, include symbols of many faiths. Especially notable are carvings by Ole Sunde of Seattle and by Arcangelo Cascieri and Adio diBaccari of Boston, Massachusetts. The windows, in classic Gothic style, are the work of the Charles J. Connick firm, as well as Willet Hauser Architectural Glass.

The Cathedral Organ was designed, built and installed in 1957 by the Aeolian-Skinner Company (Opus 1343). It contains 4,039 pipes, allowing it to interpret the whole range of organ literature. After being renovated in 2000 by Marceau & Associates, it became so skillfully voiced that even the smallest pipes can be heard in every corner of the building. Recitals are scheduled throughout the year.

== See also ==
- List of the Episcopal cathedrals of the United States
- List of cathedrals in the United States
