= Lemuel H. Wells =

American Episcopal Bishop (1841–1936)

The Right Reverend Lemuel H. Wells
- Missionary Bishop of Spokane
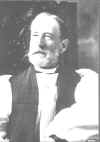
- Diocese: Episcopal Diocese of Spokane
- Successor: Herman Page

Orders
- Consecration: 1892

Personal details
- Born: December 3, 1841
- Died: March 27, 1936 (aged 94)

Lemuel Henry Wells (December 3, 1841 – March 27, 1936) was the first Bishop of the Episcopal Diocese of Spokane.

== Early years ==
Born in Yonkers, New York, Wells lived a sheltered childhood and, as a boy, experienced a desire to become a missionary. He entered Trinity College in 1860. Wells was visiting his father in Wisconsin in 1862 when the American Civil War broke out, and he was recruited as a member of the 32nd Wisconsin Infantry Regiment. He fought in the Battle of Vicksburg in 1863, and in 1864 was mustered out and returned to Trinity College, from which he was graduated in 1867.

He prepared for ministry at Berkeley Divinity School (now part of Yale Divinity School) and was ordained a Deacon in 1869. A week after his graduation from Berkeley, Wells married Elizabeth Folger, ward of Charles J. Folger, Secretary of the Treasury. The marriage was short-lived, however, as Elizabeth died following a year spent in Europe. Wells, a newly ordained priest, determined to act on his earlier desire to become a missionary and Bishop Benjamin Wistar Morris of the then-frontier states of Oregon and Washington asked Wells to become rector of a struggling mission in Walla Walla, Washington.

== Eastern Washington: 1871-1892 ==
In 1872, during his second year as rector in Walla Walla, Wells founded the St. Paul's Girls' School as well as a Boys' School that was never as successful. In 1880, Wells married the principal of St. Paul's Girls' School, Henrietta Garretson, whose father was a senator of Pennsylvania. He established thirty-one Episcopal Missions in Washington, Oregon, and Idaho - in many places, Wells' mission was the first church or religious establishment in the region. These missions included the first Episcopal congregations in:

- Waitsburg, Washington
- Dayton, Washington
- Colfax, Washington
- Pomeroy, Washington
- Weston, Oregon
- Pendleton, Oregon
- Ritzville, Washington
- La Grande, Oregon
- Cove, Oregon
- Baker City, Oregon
- Pullman, Washington
- North Yakima, Washington
- Camas Prairie, Washington
- Moscow, Idaho
- Palouse, Washington
- Northport, Washington
- Kennewick, Washington
- Zillah, Washington
- Lewiston, Idaho
- Ellensburg, Washington
- Sunnyside, Washington
- Roslyn, Washington

In 1882, Wells moved to Connecticut, but was called back to Western Washington in 1885, as rector of St. Luke's Episcopal Church, Tacoma. Charles Wright, a Tacoma railroad tycoon, was responsible for the splendid new St. Luke's, and had plans to found a Girls' School. He showed his plans to Henrietta Wells, who made several suggestions and was recruited as the first principal of Annie Wright Seminary, a venerable and successful Tacoma school. During Wells' tenure at St. Luke's, the congregation grew to such an extent that many mission churches were founded; many of Tacoma's present-day Episcopal congregations can trace their roots to Wells' influence at St. Luke's.

== Bishop of Spokane: 1892-1915 ==
In 1892 the General Convention of the Episcopal Church divided the State of Washington into two Dioceses, the Episcopal Diocese of Olympia in the western part of the state, and the Episcopal Diocese of Spokane in the eastern part. It was Wells who determined on Spokane, WA as his See city, and he and his wife moved from Tacoma to Spokane after Wells was consecrated as the first Bishop of Spokane in New Haven, Connecticut in 1892. One of the Wells' first acts in Spokane was to found another girls' school – Brunot Hall, which was conceived and organized on the train ride back from New Haven following Wells' consecration. While in Spokane he also founded St. Luke's Hospital, Spokane. Wells became something of an international celebrity while Bishop of Spokane, being invited to two Lambeth Conferences in 1900 and 1910. While in England in 1900 he was seated next to Queen Victoria at a dinner, and amused her with stories of Ulysses S. Grant (under whom Wells had served during the American Civil War) and Abraham Lincoln, whom he had met on several occasions. The Queen, thinking that the "Washington" in which Wells served was the Nation's Capital, and that Wells was a kind of chaplain to the President, invited him to family supper, and was not pleased to learn that her guest was, in fact, a missionary bishop in the rural northwest.

== Retirement ==
In 1913, Wells retired as Bishop of Spokane, recommending that a younger man would be much more suited to the rigors of horseback and stagecoach travel that was so much a part of his position. His report read as follows:

"When I first came to Eastern Washington as a missionary in 1871 I found only six communicants of the Church and nothing more in this whole district; no clergymen, no institutions. Now we have three thousand communicants, twenty clergymen, with twenty-two lay readers, ministering to sixty churches and missions. We have in successful operation – three boarding and day schools with twenty teachers and two hundred pupils, a hospital with fifty beds; a Church home for children with room for twenty-five orphans […] I doubt if any one of our mission fields can show a more remarkable growth toward self-support."

Bishop Wells and his third wife, Jane Sheldon (Henrietta Garretson having died in 1903) moved to Tacoma in their retirement. Wells was petitioned by the Episcopal Diocese of Spokane to record his memoirs upon his retirement in 1913, and in 1931 these were published as "A Pioneer Missionary." Wells died in 1936.

== See also ==
- List of Bishop Succession in the Episcopal Church

== Notes ==
Episcopal Church (USA) titles
New diocese	Bishop of Spokane; 1892–1913	Succeeded by Herman Page
