= Gretchen Rehberg =

The Right Reverend Gretchen M. Rehberg
- IX Bishop of Spokane
- Church: Episcopal Church
- Diocese: Episcopal Diocese of Spokane
- Elected: October 18, 2016
- Predecessor: James Waggoner

Orders
- Consecration: March 18, 2017 by Michael Bruce Curry

Personal details
- Education: M.Div., General Theological Seminary; D.Min., Wesley Theological Seminary

Gretchen Mary Rehberg is the ninth bishop of the Episcopal Diocese of Spokane.

== Early life and education ==
Rehberg was born in Pullman, Washington on July 7, 1964. Her mother, Margaret Rehberg (nee: Boe) was a homemaker and her father, Wallace Rehberg, was a professor at Washington State University. The family had a small farm outside of town. After graduating from Pullman High School in 1982, Rehberg attended Sewanee: The University of the South.

Rehberg's first doctorate was a Ph.D. in chemistry. She received her Master of Divinity degree from General Theological Seminary in 2002. She later received her Doctor of Ministry degree from Wesley Theological Seminary.

== Career ==
Rehberg was a professor of organic chemistry at Bucknell University until the late 1990s, when she left to enter theological school. For over 20 years, Rehberg volunteered as an EMT and firefighter. She was in New York City on September 11, 2001 and provided first aid to survivors of the World Trade Center attack. Later, she volunteered with a hazmat team doing cleanup at Ground Zero.

Rehberg was rector of the Episcopal Church of the Nativity in Lewiston, Idaho for 11 years prior to her consecration as bishop. She had also held several diocesan leadership positions. On October 18, 2016, she was elected as the ninth bishop of the Episcopal Diocese of Spokane, and she was consecrated at the Episcopal Cathedral of St. John the Evangelist in Spokane on March 18, 2017.

Rehberg has pulmonary fibrosis, possibly caused by conditions she experienced in her work in New York after the World Trade Center attack. In 2022, she suffered a flare up that significantly reduced her lung capacity and as of May 2023, is awaiting a double-lung transplant while she continues to travel her diocese in her work as bishop. She underwent successful double-lung transplant surgery in March 2026 and returned to full-time work as bishop in late summer 2026.

Episcopal Church (USA) titles
Preceded by James Edward Waggoner Jr.	Bishop of Spokane; 2017–present	Incumbent
