= Leigh A. Wallace Jr. =

Leigh Allen Wallace Jr. (February 5, 1927 - October 7, 2010) was bishop of the Episcopal Diocese of Spokane, serving from 1979 to 1990.

Wallace was the son of college football All-American and noted wrestling coach Polly Wallace.

Episcopal Church (USA) titles
Preceded by John Wyatt	Bishop of Spokane; 1979–1990	Succeeded by Frank Jeffrey Terry Jr.
