= Polly Wallace =

American football player, wrestler and wrestling coach

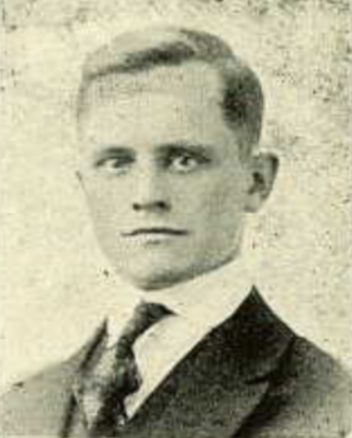

Profile
- Position: Center

Personal information
- Born: February 10, 1898
- Died: February 9, 1971 (aged 72); Great Falls, Montana, U.S.
- Listed weight: 181 lb (82 kg)

Awards and highlights
- First-team All-MVC (1926)

Leigh Allen "Polly" Wallace (February 10, 1898 – February 9, 1971) was an American football player, wrestler and wrestling coach.

== Early life ==
Wallace was born in 1898. He graduated from Oklahoma City High School in 1916, where he played football and basketball. He then played football at the center position for the Iowa State Cyclones football team. His athletic career was interrupted by military service during World War I. He returned to Iowa State after the war and was selected by Walter Eckersall as a first-team player on the 1920 College Football All-America Team.

== Coaching career ==
Wallace later became the wrestling coach at the University of Oklahoma.

Wallace served as the head football coach and athletic director at Cornell College in Mount Vernon, Iowa in 1924. He was the head football coach at East Central University (then known as East Central State Normal School) in Ada, Oklahoma from 1927 to 1933.

== Family and later years ==
Wallace moved to Great Falls, Montana, in 1937 to work with lumber dealers. He later operated a lumber yard there. He also served several terms as the county's treasurer.

Wallace died in 1971. He was jogging along Tenth Avenue South near Great Falls when he was struck by a car as he tried to cross the street.

Wallace was posthumously inducted into the Iowa State Hall of Fame in 2000.

Wallace and his wife, Nellie, had two children, a son and a daughter. His son, Leigh A. Wallace Jr., became an Episcopalian bishop.

== Head coaching record ==
=== Football ===
Year	Team	Overall	Conference	Standing
Cornell Purple (Midwest Conference) (1924)
1924	Cornell	6–0–1	3–0–1	T–1st
Cornell:		6–0–1	3–0–1	
East Central Tigers (Oklahoma Intercollegiate Conference) (1927–1928)
1927	East Central	1–6–1	0–6–1	10th
1928	East Central	4–3–2	3–2–2	T–5th
East Central Tigers (Oklahoma Collegiate Conference) (1929–1933)
1929	East Central	5–3	3–1	2nd
1930	East Central	8–1	4–0	1st
1931	East Central	6–3–1	2–2–1	3rd
1932	East Central	4–3–2	2–2–1	4th
1933	East Central	2–5–2	0–3–2	T–5th
East Central:		30–24–8	14–16–7	
Total:		36–24–9		
National championship Conference title Conference division title or championship game berth
