= James E. Waggoner Jr. =

American bishop of the Episcopal Church (1947–2026)

The Right Reverend James Edward Waggoner Jr. D.D.
- Bishop of Spokane
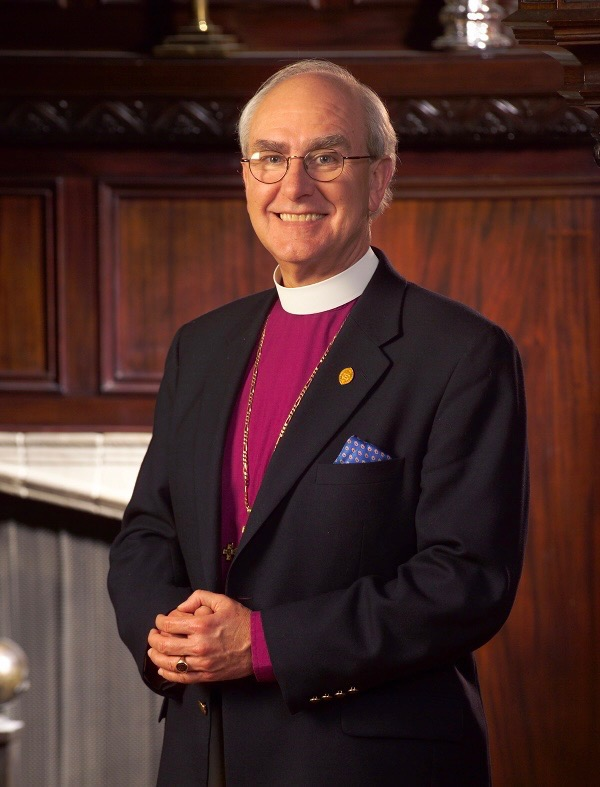
- Church: The Episcopal Church
- In office: October 2000 – March 2017
- Other post: Assisting Bishop of Nevada (2019–2022)

Orders
- Consecration: October 21, 2000

Personal details
- Born: 1948 or 1949
- Died: February 27, 2026 (aged 77)
- Education: Marshall University, B.A.; Virginia Theological Seminary, MDiv, D.Min., D.D.

James Edward Waggoner Jr., D.D. (1948 or 1949 – February 27, 2026) was an American clergyman of the Episcopal Church, who served as the eighth bishop of the Episcopal Diocese of Spokane. In 2019, he became Assisting Bishop in the Episcopal Diocese of Nevada and served through March 2021.

Waggoner Jr. held a Bachelor of Arts degree from Marshall University and earned his Master of Divinity, Doctor of Ministry and Doctor of Divinity degrees from Virginia Theological Seminary.

After graduating from seminary, he served the Diocese of West Virginia for twenty-one years including twelve years in parish ministry, and nine years on the bishop’s staff before being elected eighth Bishop of the Diocese of Spokane. He was consecrated in October 2000. He was appointed as the assisting bishop at the Episcopal Diocese of Nevada in April 2019. As of March 2022, he was retired.

Waggoner died on February 27, 2026, at the age of 78, according to announcements from the Diocese of Spokane, the Diocese of West Virginia, and The Living Church magazine.

Episcopal Church (USA) titles
| Preceded by Frank Jeffrey Terry Jr. | Bishop of Spokane; 2000–2017 | Succeeded by Gretchen Rehberg |
