= Edward Makin Cross =

The Right Reverend Edward Makin Cross
- III Bishop of Spokane
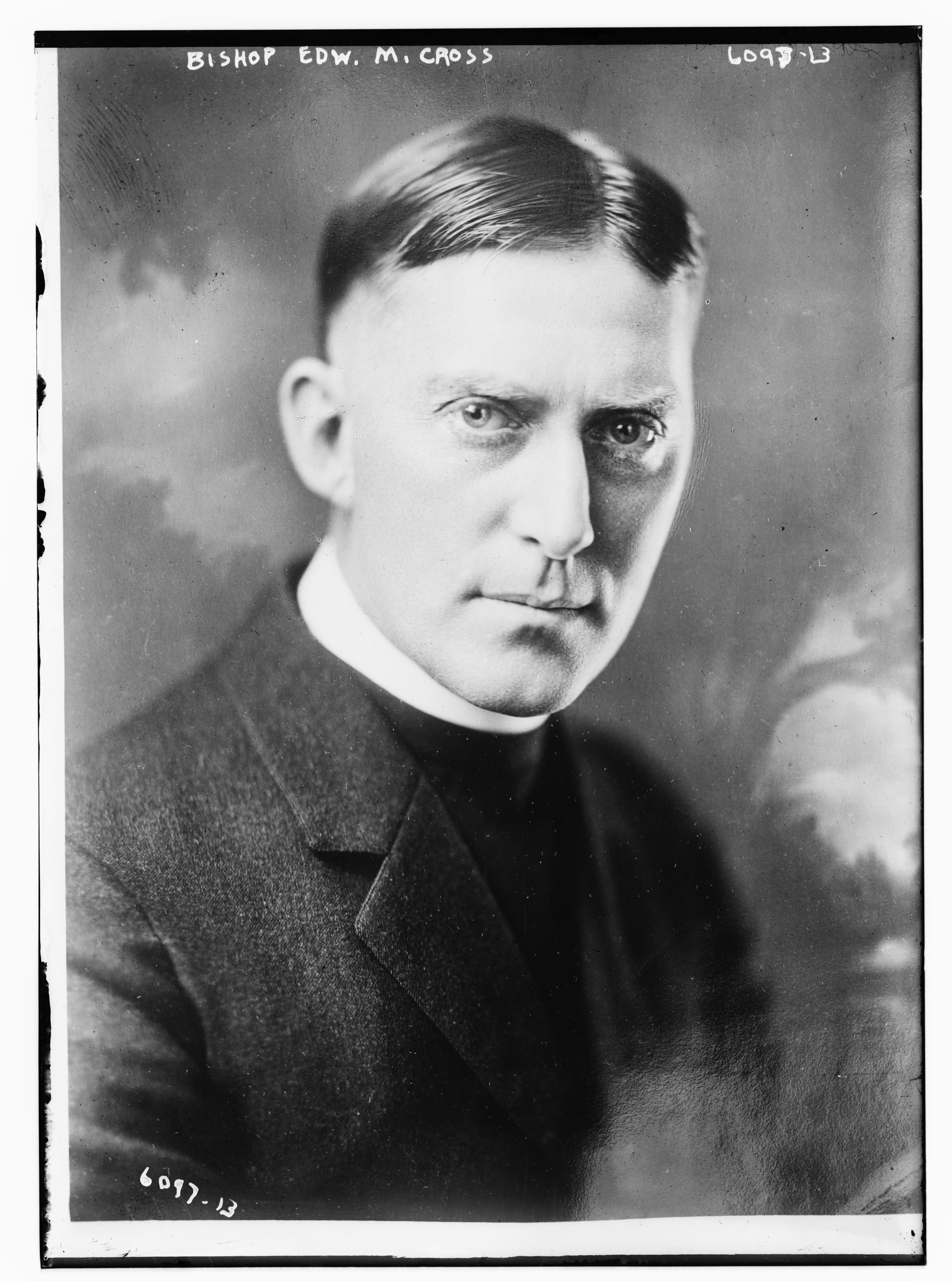
- Province: The Episcopal Church
- Diocese: Spokane

Orders
- Ordination: 1907
- Consecration: February 20, 1924

Personal details
- Born: Philadelphia, Pennsylvania
- Died: December 7, 1965
- Buried: Greenwood Cemetery, Spokane, Washington

Edward Makin Cross (March 1 1880–1965) was a bishop of Spokane in The Episcopal Church. He had previously been rector of St. John the Evangelist in St. Paul, Minnesota. He was instrumental in the development of a summer camp on Lake Coeur d'Alene which is named for him.
