= Episcopal Diocese of Spokane =

Diocese in eastern Washington and North Idaho, USA

Coordinates: 47°38′42″N 117°24′35″W

Diocese of Spokane

Location
- Ecclesiastical province: Province VIII

Statistics
- Congregations: 33 (2025)
- Members: 2,915 (2025)

Information
- Rite: Episcopal
- Cathedral: St. John's (Spokane)

Current leadership
- Bishop: Gretchen Rehberg

Map
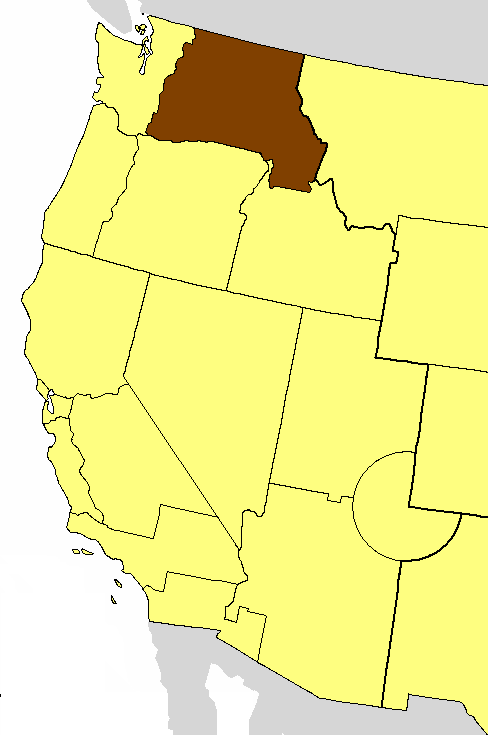
- Location of the Diocese of Spokane

Website
- www.spokanediocese.org

The Episcopal Diocese of Spokane is a diocese of the Episcopal Church in eastern Washington and northern Idaho, United States. Its office and cathedral seat are in Spokane, Washington. The current bishop is Gretchen Rehberg, the first woman to lead the Diocese.

The diocese reported 5,244 members in 2015 and 2,915 members in 2025. Plate and pledge income for the 33 filing congregations of the diocese in 2025 was $4,007,074. Average Sunday attendance (ASA) for 2025 was 1,245 persons. This was a relative decline from 1,788 ASA reported in 2015.

The Diocese of Spokane started as a missionary district in the mid-1860s. One of the earliest missionary priests, Lemuel H. Wells, established twenty-three missions in the late 19th century and became the first Bishop of Spokane in 1892.

The early part of the 20th century saw the growth of Christian education programs. This included the establishment of a summer camp for youth on Lake Coeur d'Alene in northern Idaho. Named after Bishop Edward M. Cross, Camp Cross was one of the first camps in the area; it started out as a summer school in 1923 on Lake Chelan before its current property on Lake Coeur d'Alene was donated by Bishop Herman Page.

By the mid 20th century, the Cathedral of St. John the Evangelist in Spokane was begun and completed. A striking example of American neo-gothic architecture, the Cathedral dominates the southern skyline of Spokane as it sits high upon a hill overlooking downtown.

The late 20th century saw the establishment of a diocesan housing corporation to bring more housing for the elderly throughout the diocese, as well as the expansion and strengthening of local ministries.

The territory of the Diocese of Spokane has thirty-two congregations and encompasses all of Washington east of the Cascades and the northern Idaho panhandle. Western Washington is within the Diocese of Olympia, and southern Idaho is in the Diocese of Idaho, seated at St. Michael's in Boise.

== Bishops ==
1. Lemuel Henry Wells (1892–1913)
2. Herman Page (1915–1923)
3. Edward Makin Cross (1924–1954)
4. Russell Sturgis Hubbard (1954–1967)
5. John Wyatt (1967–1978)
6. Leigh A. Wallace, Jr. (1979–1990)
7. Frank Jeffrey Terry, Jr. (1990–1999)
8. James E. Waggoner, Jr. (2000–2017)
9. Gretchen Rehberg (2017–Present)
