= Liberty Lake Regional Park =

Park in Washington, United States

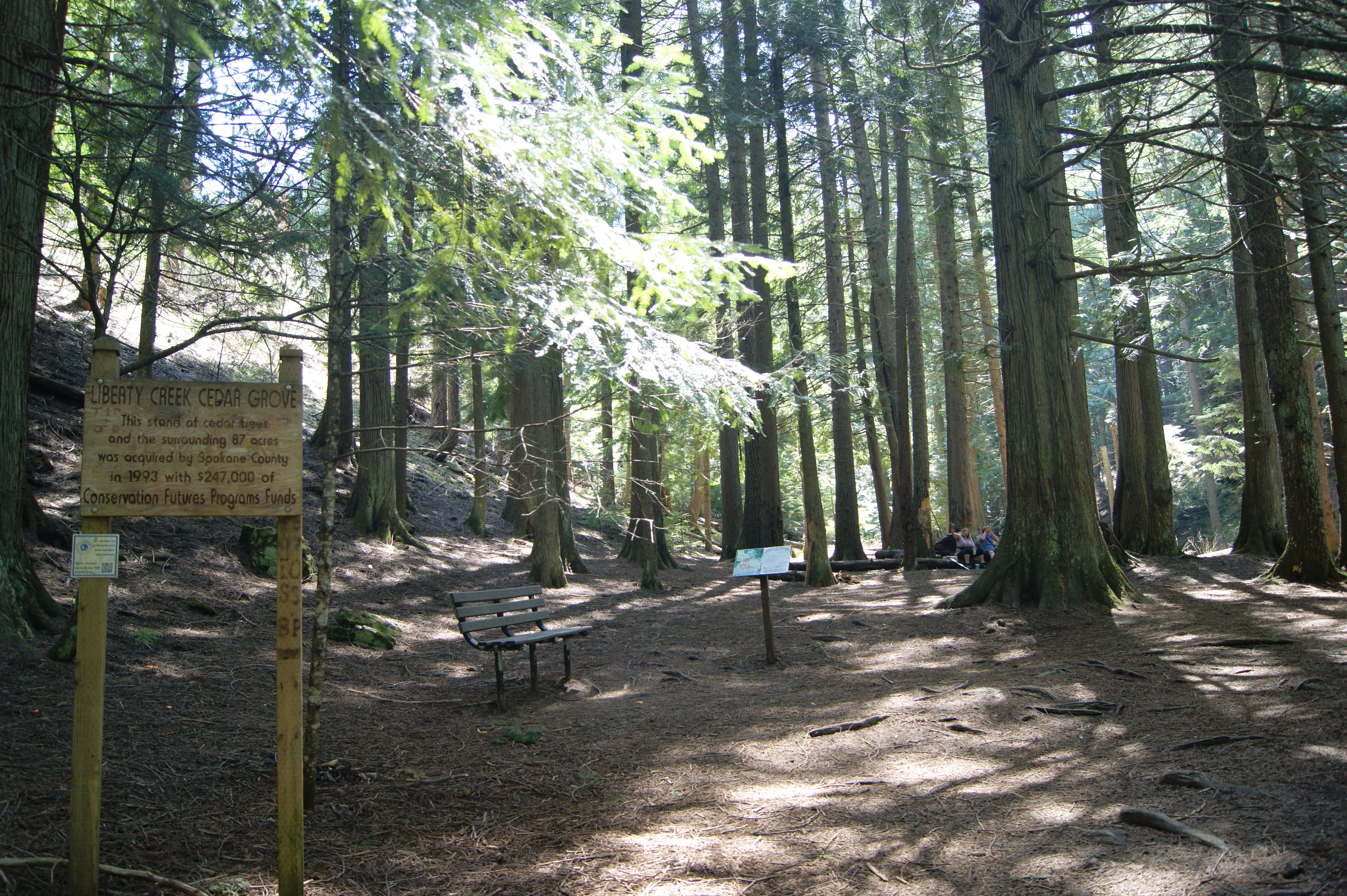
- Interactive map of Liberty Lake Regional Park
- Nearest city: Liberty Lake, Washington
- Coordinates: 47.610°N 117.056°W
- Area: 3,591 acres (1,453 ha)
- Established: 1966
- Owner: Spokane County Parks and Recreation

Liberty Lake Regional Park is a 3,591-acre (1,453 ha) regional park in the U.S. state of Washington. The park owner, Spokane County, calls it "one of the largest [parks] in Washington"; it is about 1 mile across east to west (extending to the Idaho state line) and five miles north to south, more than four times larger than Marymoor Park in King County. The park has a corner on the southeast shore of Liberty Lake.

== See also ==
- Liberty Park (Spokane, Washington), a city park in Spokane
