= Liberty Park (Spokane, Washington) =

Park in Spokane County, Washington, United States of America

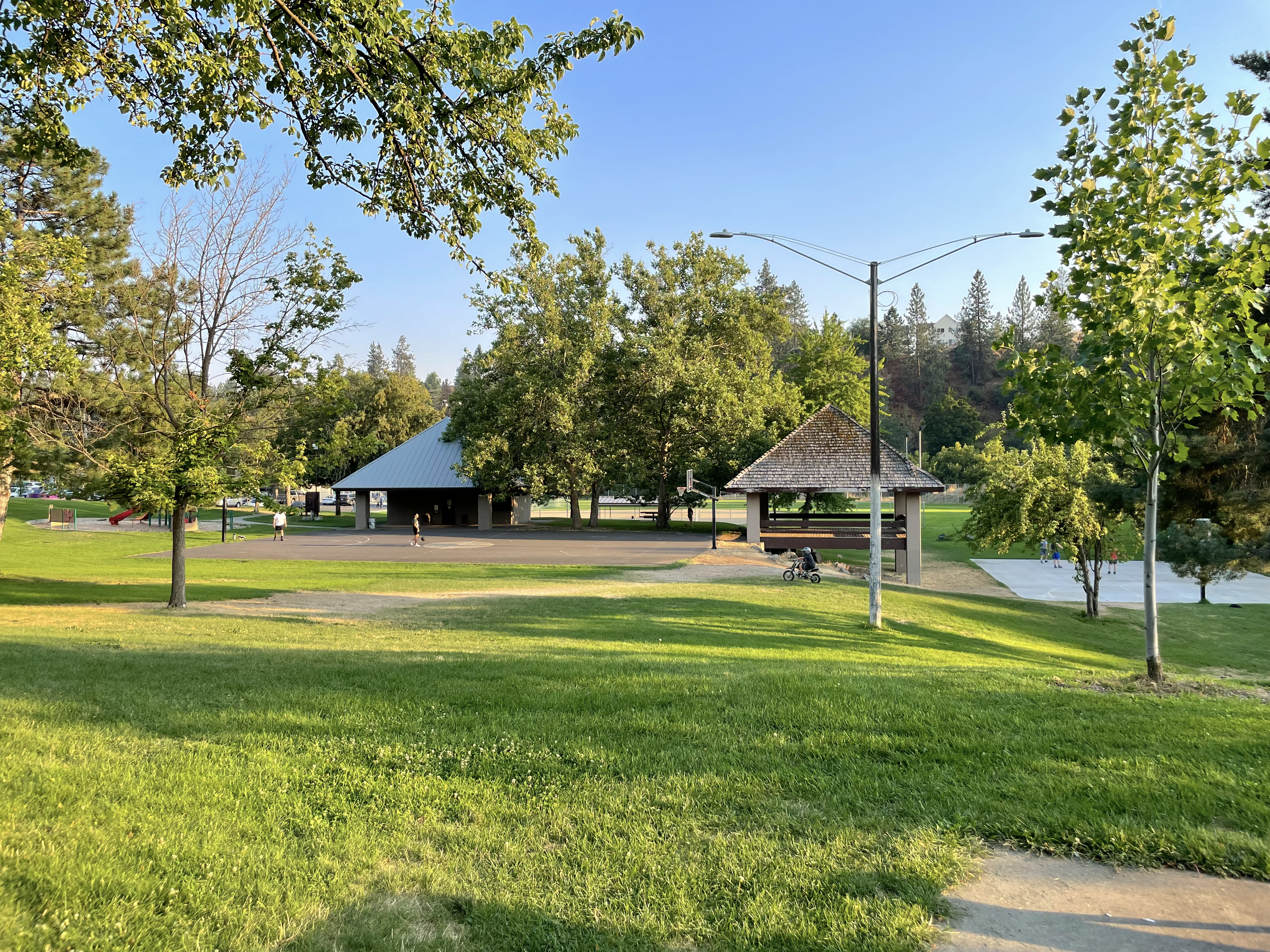
- Basketball courts and pavilions at Liberty Park
- Interactive map of Liberty Park
- Type: Urban Park
- Location: Spokane, Washington
- Coordinates: 47°39′09″N 117°23′26″W
- Area: 22 acres (8.9 ha)
- Established: 1897; 129 years ago
- Operator: Spokane Parks and Recreation Department
- Status: Open year round (daily 6 a.m. to 10 pm)
- Public transit: Spokane Transit Authority

Liberty Park is a 22-acre (8.9 ha) public park at Third Ave and Perry St in East Central, Spokane, Washington. It is open daily with entry gratis.

Designed by Kirtland Cutter and adapted by the Olmsted Brothers, the park was once considered one of the finest in Spokane and the wider region, but was dramatically reshaped and transformed when Interstate 90 was built through the park in the 1960s. The interchange connecting I-90 with Washington State Route 290 was built on the land that formerly contained the bulk of the park. Ruins of the former park are visible to drivers as they pass through the interchange, with the contemporary park located on the opposite side of the freeway.

To counter the loss of land taken by the freeway, the park was expanded eastward from its original location. In addition to traditional park features like grass lawns, sports facilities and play equipment, Liberty Park is home to a branch of the Spokane Public Library and an aquatic center.

== History ==
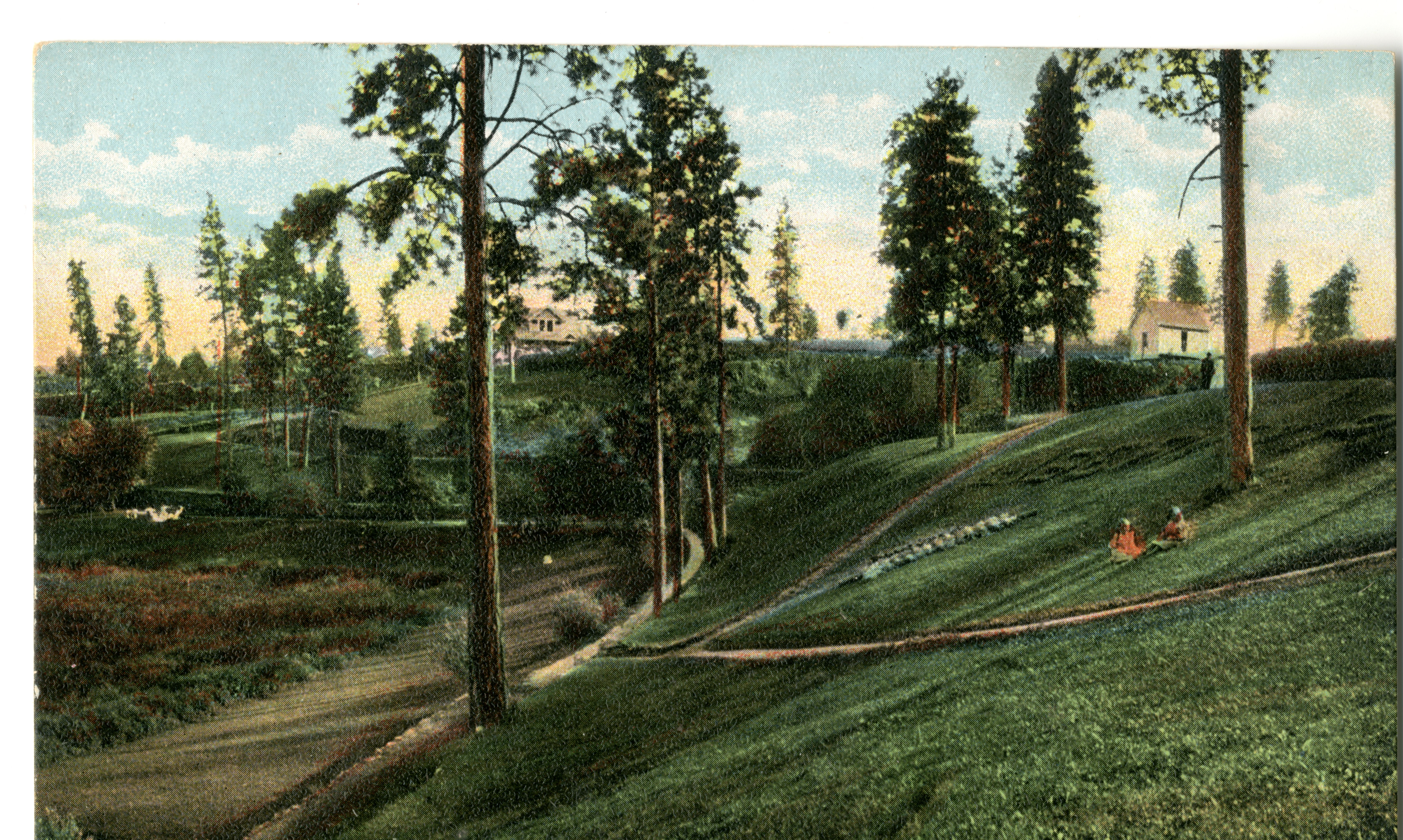
Liberty Park in the 1910s

The land that became Liberty Park was gifted to the city of Spokane by wealthy local industrialist F. Lewis Clark in 1897 and its name was chosen a year later by a vote of residents of the neighboring Liberty Place Addition. The original park stretched from Third Ave. in the north to Fifth Ave. in the south and Arthur St. in the west to Perry St. in the east and was home to a country club for wealthy members. The surrounding neighborhood was developed in the 1890s as well as a streetcar suburb for working class people. The wealthy members and the working class residents did not get along well, and the country club was soon moved to another of Spokane's grand early parks, Manito Park.

During the first three years of the park's existence, the city spent $6,000 on road-grading and irrigation projects. Famed Pacific Northwest architect Kirtland Cutter drew up the park's original design plans. In 1908, renowned landscape architects the Olmsted Brothers drew up new design plans for the park, which included adding a stone pergola on the high ground overlooking a lake and the rest of the park grounds. The ruins of that pergola are now located outside of the park, on the other side of I-90, and are sometimes referred to as "Spokane's Stonehenge." Work on the Olmsted Brothers' plan was completed in 1913. The brothers said of Liberty Park at the time that it was "so much broken into hills and valleys with abrupt slopes and prominent projecting ledges that it is capable of uncommonly picturesque landscape gardening development."

Another part of the Olmsted Brothers' plan was to draw children to the park, which made Liberty Park the site of Spokane's first public playground. Other play equipment such as swing sets and wading pools were constructed as well. In 1908, another way the park attempted to draw children was by hiring a "competent and reliable woman" to look after children who were left at the park by the mothers on their way into downtown for shopping. A public pool, one of the city's first, opened in Liberty Park in 1920.

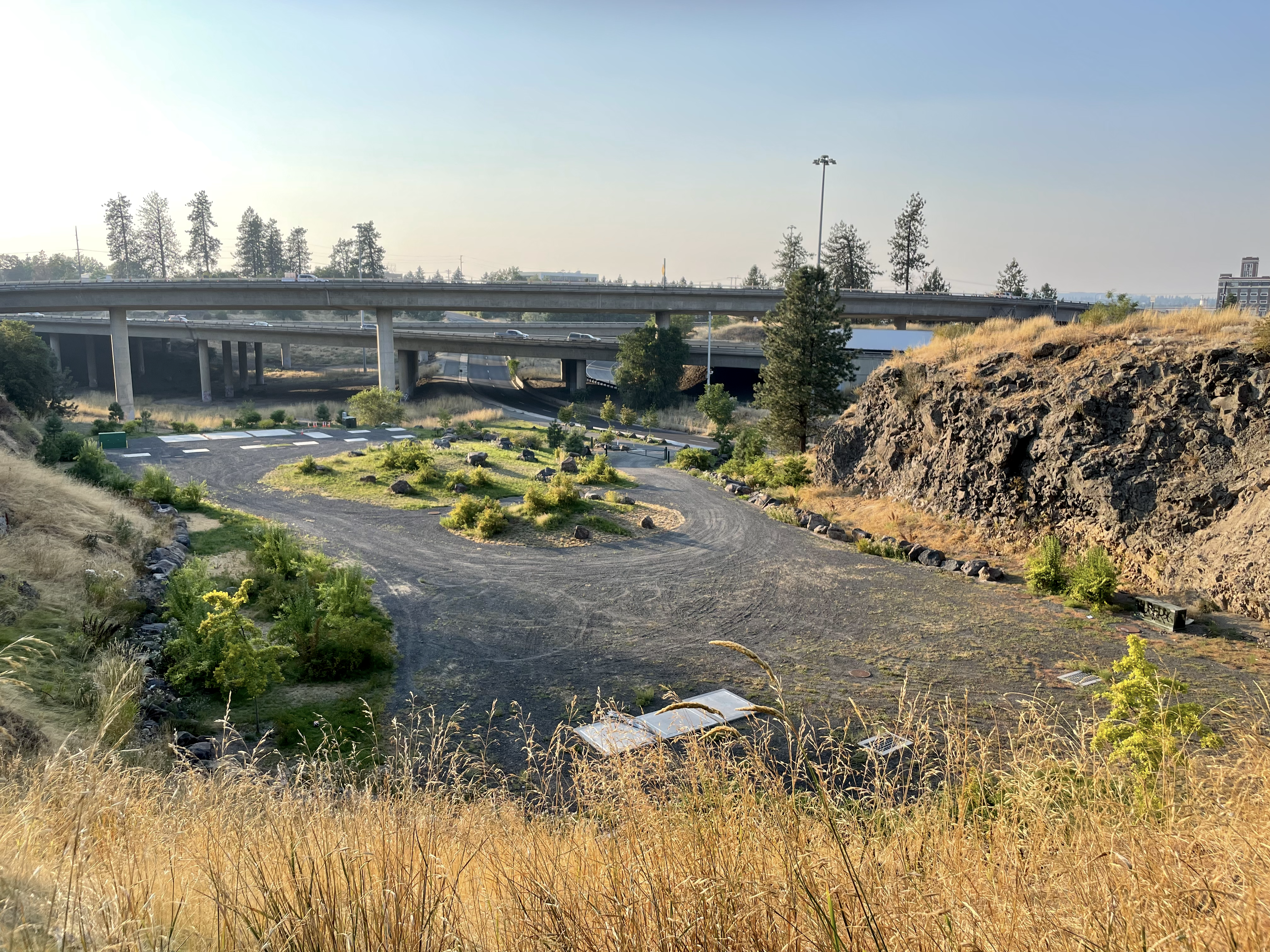
View of the old park showing the crater, former lake and intrusion of the highways. The ruins of the pergola are just beyond the overpasses.

According to Tracy Rebstock with the Washington State Archives, the park's fortunes began to decline around the start of the Great Depression. In 1937, a group of striking workers stole a delivery truck and pushed it off the cliff into the lake below. Maintenance work on the lake had been stopped in the years prior, and the lake had turned into an overgrown swamp. By 1949, a decision was made to fill in the lake entirely with non-burnable waste.

Liberty Park's fortunes took an even bigger blow in the 1950s as plans were being drawn up to bring an interstate highway through Spokane. Four routes were proposed, taking different routes through the city center, but all four divergent proposals converged at or immediately adjacent to Liberty Park. With the park already in decline, and a history of redlining in the surrounding East Central area that had made it one of the most diverse areas of Spokane. As was the case in cities around the region, those conditions made Liberty Park and East Central an obvious location to construct the interstate. Of the park's 21 acres, 18 were destroyed, along with over 1,000 homes in East Central, to make way for the highway.

The new Liberty Park was completed in 1973 with a smaller pond, baseball diamonds, a pavilion, tennis, basketball and horseshoe courts, along with restrooms. Lighting was also installed in an effort to reduce crime and vandalism. A pool was later added to the new park, which was subsequently expanded into an aquatics center in 2010. In 2021, the Liberty Park Library, a branch of the Spokane Public Library, was opened in the park.

== Setting ==
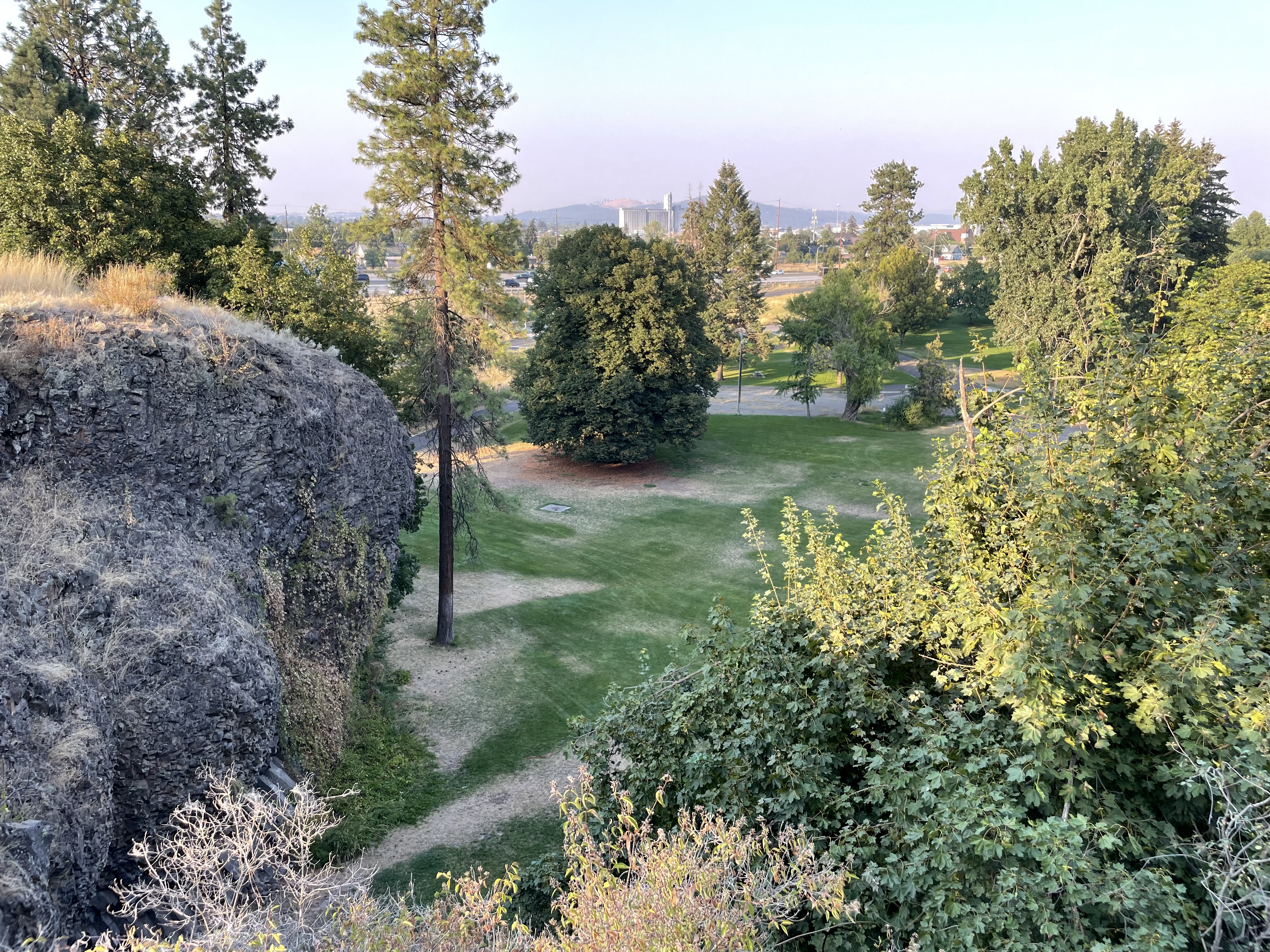
Liberty Park from above

Liberty Park is located in the East Central neighborhood of Spokane, about a mile-and-a-half east-southeast of the city center. The original site of the park which stretched west from Perry St. four blocks to Arthur St. is now owned by the Washington State Department of Transportation and is crisscrossed by elevated overpasses of the interchange between Interstate 90 and Washington Route 290, with Interstate 90 itself cutting straight through the middle of the former parkland. Ruins of the grand stone pergola which once overlooked the park from above at Third Ave. and Arthur St. is now cut off by the interstate from the current park.

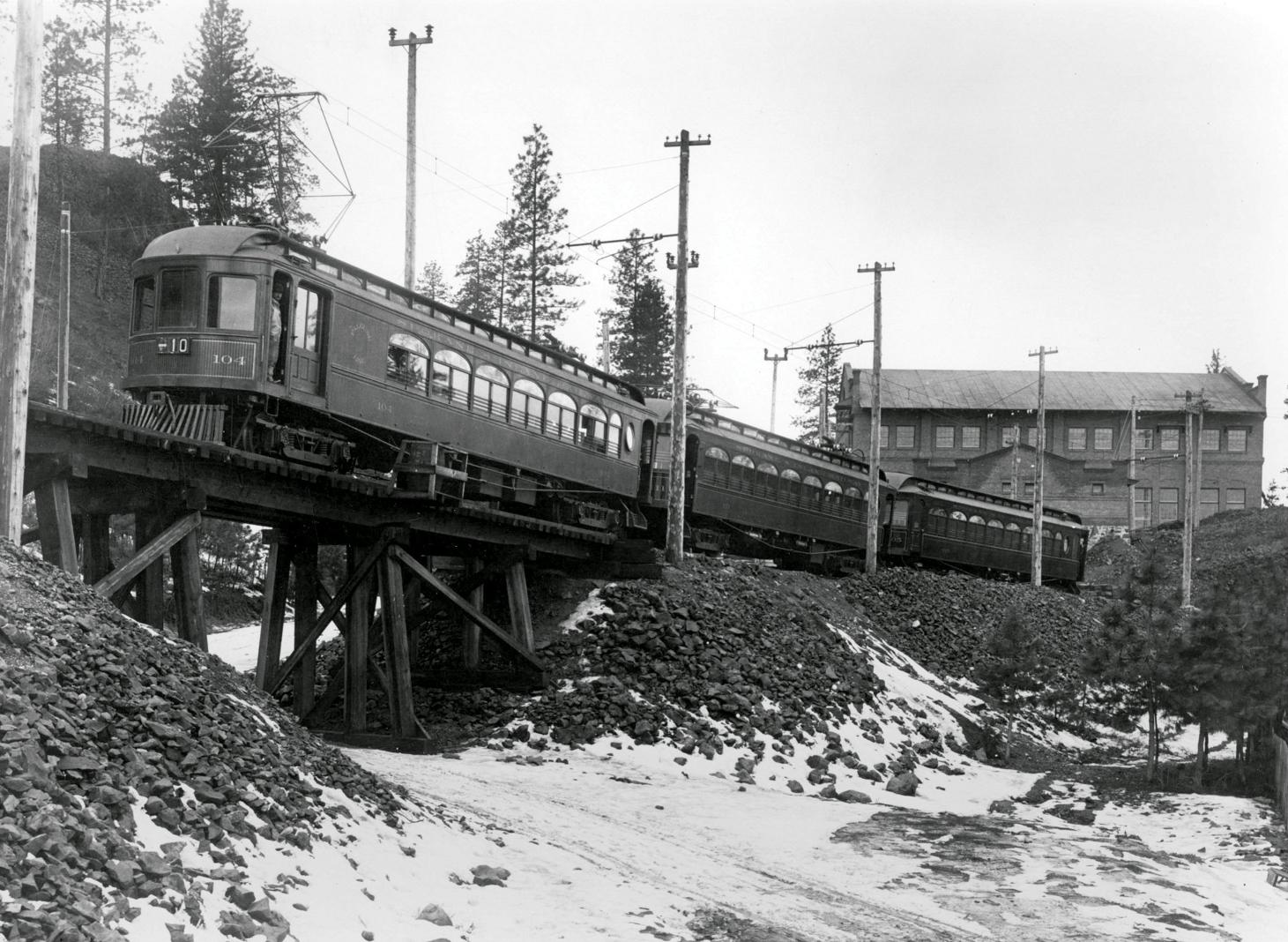
Railroad and Frequency Changing Station above Liberty Park. Old Liberty Park was located just beyond the building, while new Liberty Park is on the side from the photo.

Old Liberty Park was also the site of a curious geological feature that for decades confounded geologists and residents alike. A crater with a 40-foot deep lake, sometimes also referred to as a pond, was located in the middle of the old park site. Early theories proposed that the crater was that of an extinct volcano. In 1957, a local resident proposed digging in the crater to find preserved mastodon bones. By the 1960s the prevailing theory on the crater's creation was that the Missoula floods at the end of the last ice age forced the Spokane River to divert from its banks and flow over the cliff where Lincoln Park would eventually be developed. The action of the water flowing over the cliff face would have eroded the area into its crater-like shape. The lake was eventually filled and leveled off, though the crater remains and can be seen from Third Ave. immediately to the west of the current park.

The Ben Burr Trail, for pedestrians and non-motorized vehicles, passes through the park and connects it to areas to the south in the Lincoln Heights neighborhood, and areas to the north and west such as Downtown Spokane, the Gonzaga University campus in the Logan neighborhood, and the Spokane River Centennial Trail. The Ben Burr Trail largely follows the route of the former Spokane and Inland Empire Railroad, which formerly ran along the ridge atop the park's southern cliff. The National Register of Historic Places listed Frequency Changing Station is also perched atop the southern cliff along the route of the former railroad line.

The park is located at the base of the slope of Spokane's South Hill, which rises over 100 feet as a sheer cliff along Liberty Park's southern edge. In the park's center is a basalt outcrop which also rises 100 feet to a flat-topped tableland. These basalt rocks are part of the Columbia River Basalt Group, flood basalts laid down millions of years ago. Almost all of the current iteration of the park is located east of the original park site, which originally went only as far east as Perry St.

== Amenities ==
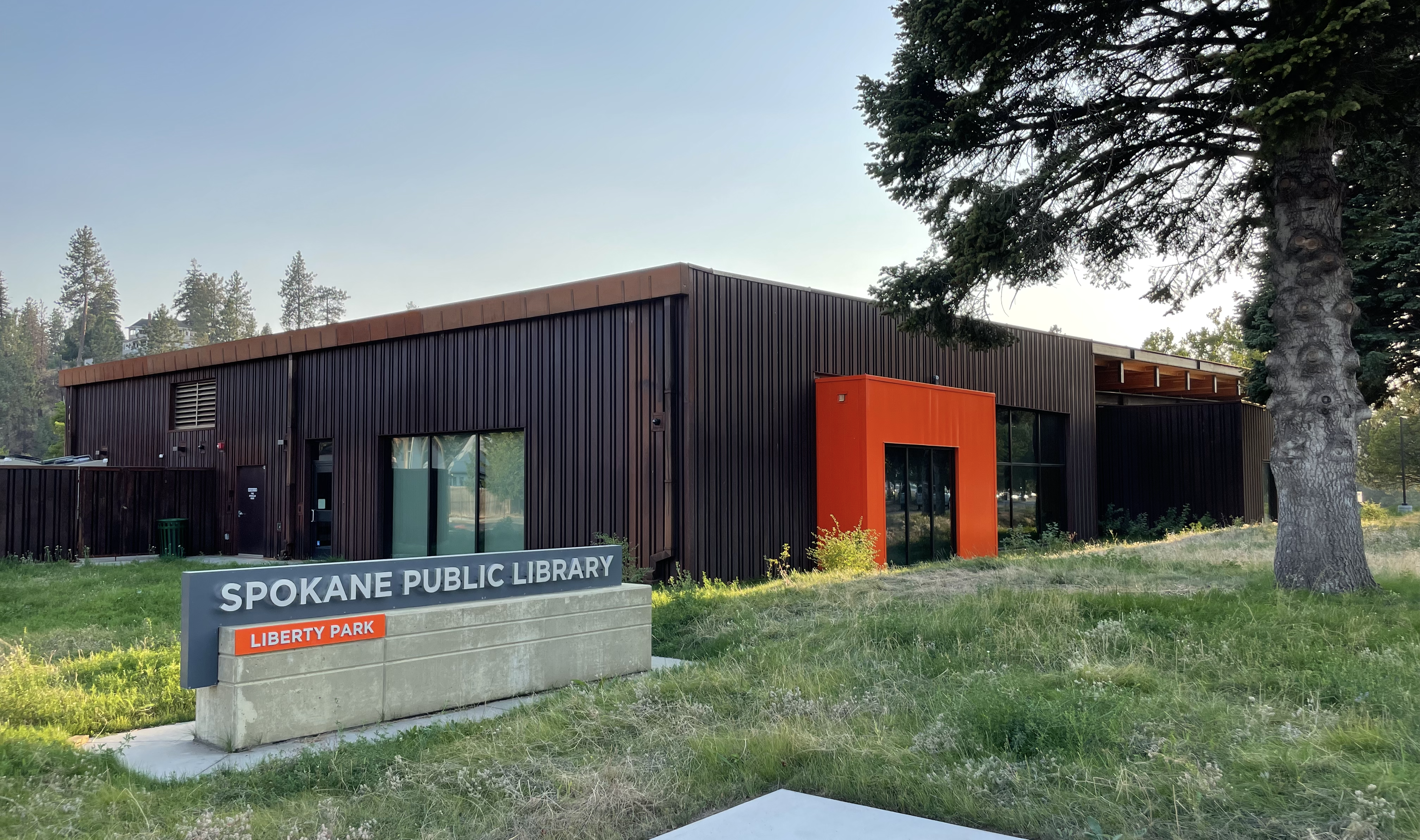
Liberty Park Library

In addition to grass lawns with shade trees, Liberty Park features numerous recreational amenities. Athletic facilities in the park include multiple basketball courts, a lighted softball diamond and horseshoes pits. For children there is a play structure and swing set. There are two picnic shelters in the park in addition to numerous picnic tables scattered around the lawns.

The Liberty Park pool was upgraded in 2010 and is now the Liberty Park Aquatic Center. The outdoor facility includes a playground in a zero-depth entry pool, two water slides, and a six-lane pool with a diving board.

Opened in 2021, the Liberty Park Library was built on the site of former tennis courts in the park. A sustainable landscape known as the meadow is being grown around the library featuring pollinator-friendly plants that are not water or maintenance-intensive. The library is open seven days a week.

Spokane Transit Authority's bus route 94 provides public transit service to the park seven days a week, running along the streets on the northern edge of the park.

== See also ==
- Spokane, Washington – Parks and recreation
