= East Central, Spokane =

East Central
- Spokane Neighborhood
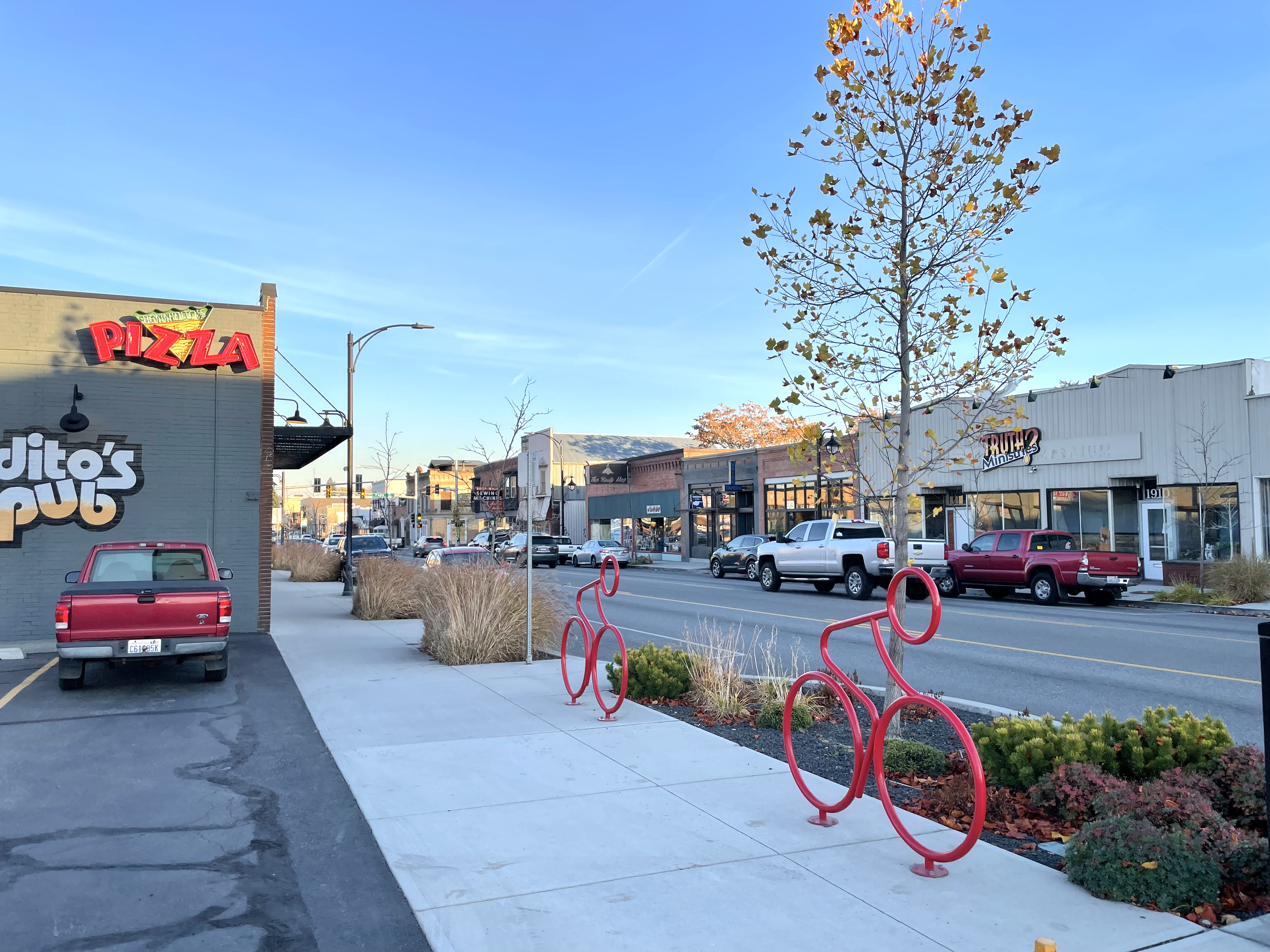
- Sprague Union District

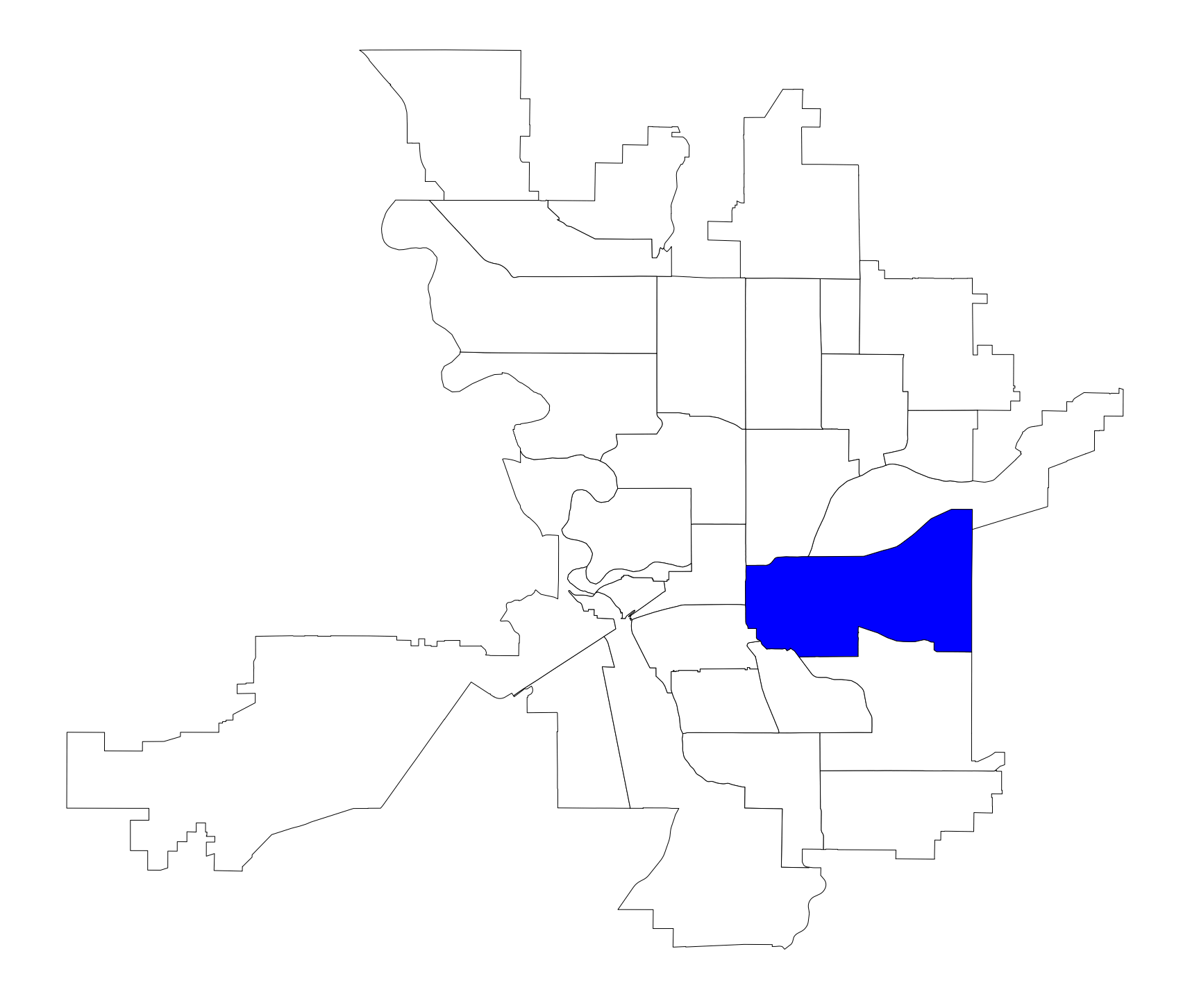
- Location within the city of Spokane
- Coordinates: 47°39′29.5″N 117°22′22.5″W
- Country: United States
- State: Washington
- County: Spokane
- City: Spokane

Population (2017)
  - Total: 12,126

Demographics 2017
  - White: 76.7%
  - Black: 6.3%
  - Latinx: 7.5%
  - Asian: 5.0%
  - Native American: 2.6%
- Time zone: UTC-8 (PST)
  - Summer (DST): UTC-7 (PDT)
- ZIP Codes: 99202
- Area code: 509

East Central is a neighborhood in Spokane, Washington. As the name suggests, it is on the east side of Spokane and centrally located. The official neighborhood is expansive and covers multiple areas considered by locals to be independent neighborhoods, such as the Sprague Union District on East Sprague Avenue, the South Perry District, the Underhill Park area and the University District on the eastern fringe of Downtown Spokane.

== Geography ==
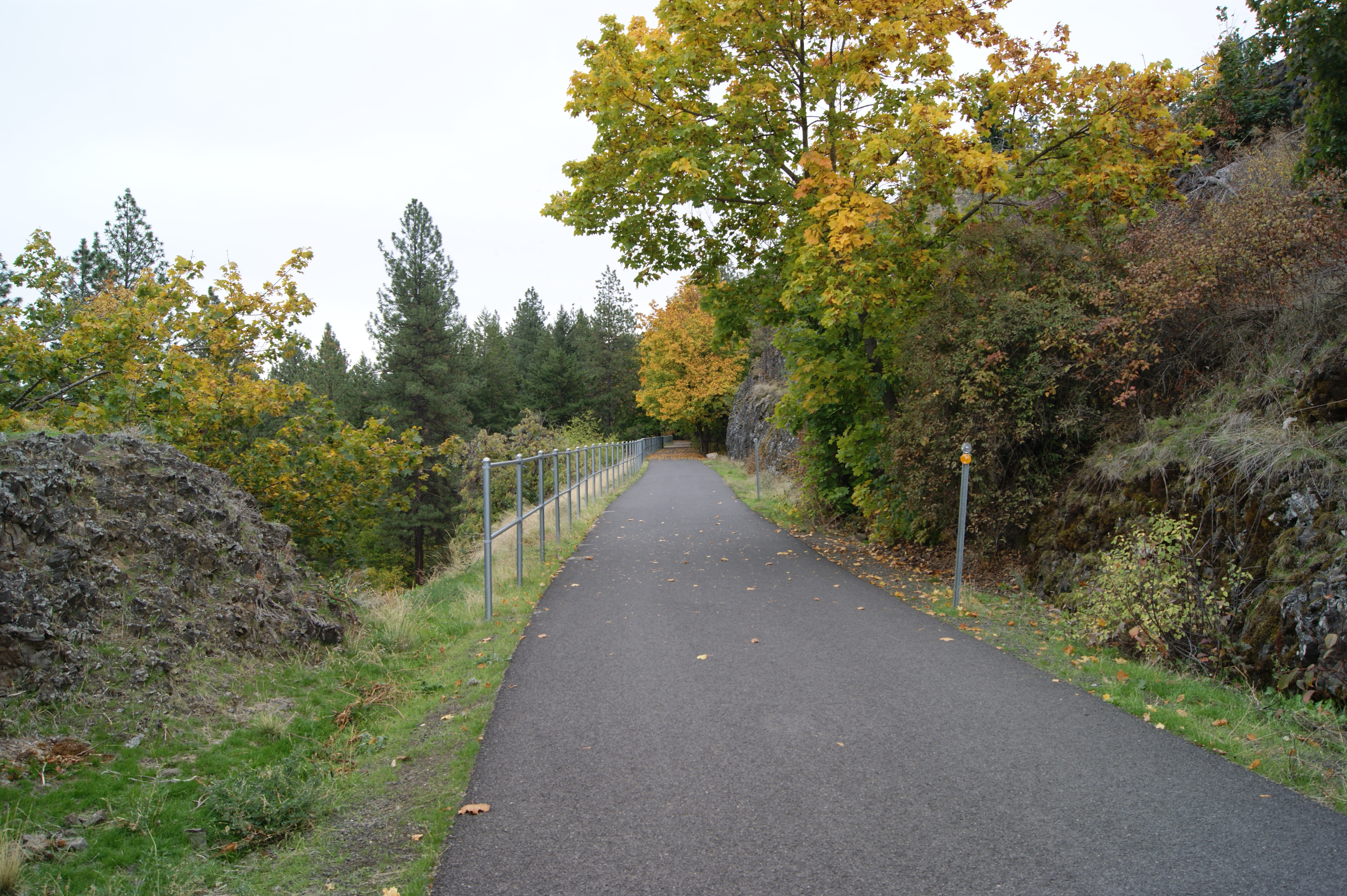
The Ben Burr Trail is a greenway that lies in the center of the neighborhood

East Central is officially bounded by Spokane Falls Boulevard and Trent Avenue in the north. Havana Street is its eastern boundary, also serving as the municipal border between the city of Spokane and the city of Spokane Valley. The southern boundary follows 13th Avenue west from Havana to Freya Street, then the Ben Burr Trail and Spokane Valley Bluff to Crestline Street, then 14th Avenue to Southeast Boulevard and 12th Avenue to Rockwood Boulevard. Rockwood Boulevard meets Cowley Street and the neighborhood boundary extends north.

=== Districts ===
==== South Perry District ====
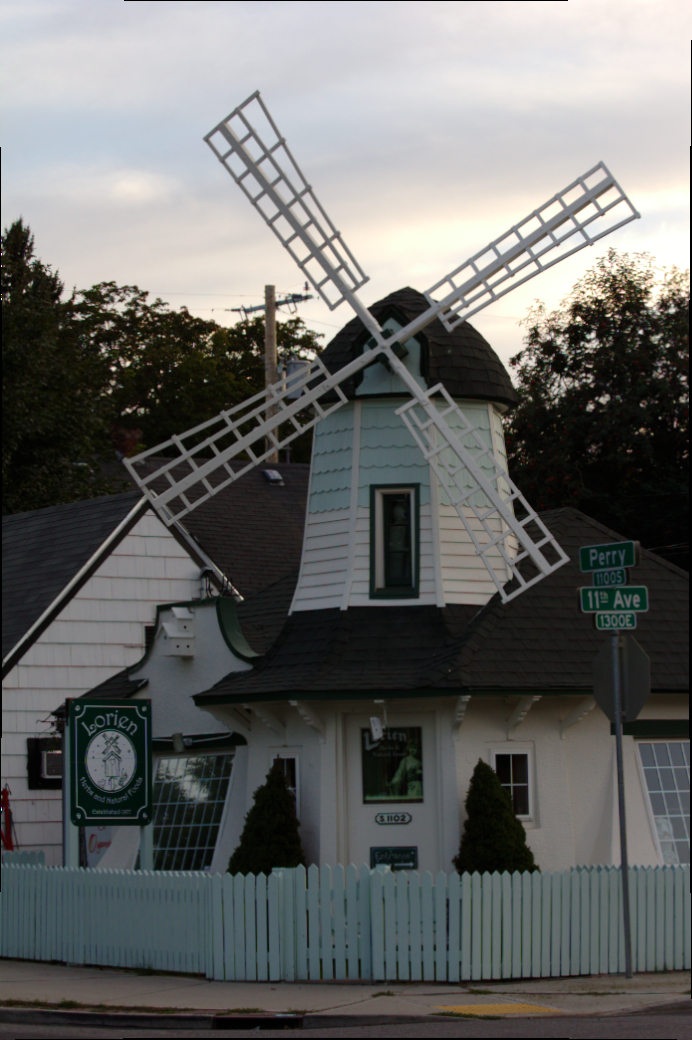
Cambern Dutch Shop Windmill in the South Perry District

Located in the southwestern corner of East Central, the South Perry District spills over into the Lincoln Heights and Rockwood neighborhoods. It is centered on a commercial district along Perry Street near Grant Park and Grant Elementary School. The district and surrounding area are located on the South Hill, as the area south of Downtown Spokane is known colloquially. The stretch of Perry Street from 9th to 13th Avenues is home to numerous shops, bars, restaurants and retail stores. It is also the location of a weekly farmers' market during the spring, summer and fall.

Liberty Park, a neighborhood landmark, is located on the northern edge of the South Perry District where it meets the Sprague Union District.

==== Sprague Union District ====
Centered on East Sprague Avenue, the main surface thoroughfare extending eastward from downtown Spokane through the City of Spokane Valley, the Sprague Union District is equal parts an arterial meant for passing through and a district made to stop in. Sprague Avenue is the primary east-to-west surface street in the Spokane metropolitan area but here it is close enough to the city center that it is also a surface street used for local traffic. The area from Altamont Street on the east to Liberty Park on the west is historic and home to numerous antique stores, shops, restaurants, bars and apartments.

To the north of the neighborhood are the railroad tracks of the Spokane Subdivision and Interstate 90 passes through the area three blocks south of Sprague Avenue, cutting the Sprague Union District off from much of the rest of East Central.

==== Underhill Park ====
On the eastern side of East Central is Underhill Park, a property owned by the City of Spokane and operated as a public park on the slope leading up to the South Hill from the flat bottom of the Spokane Valley. This part of East Central is predominantly single-family residential, though a commercial district at the Thor/Freya exit from Interstate 90 is home to many services like gas and grocery. Interstate 90 cuts through the area going east-to-west, separating it from the Sprague Union District of East Central to the north.

==== University District ====
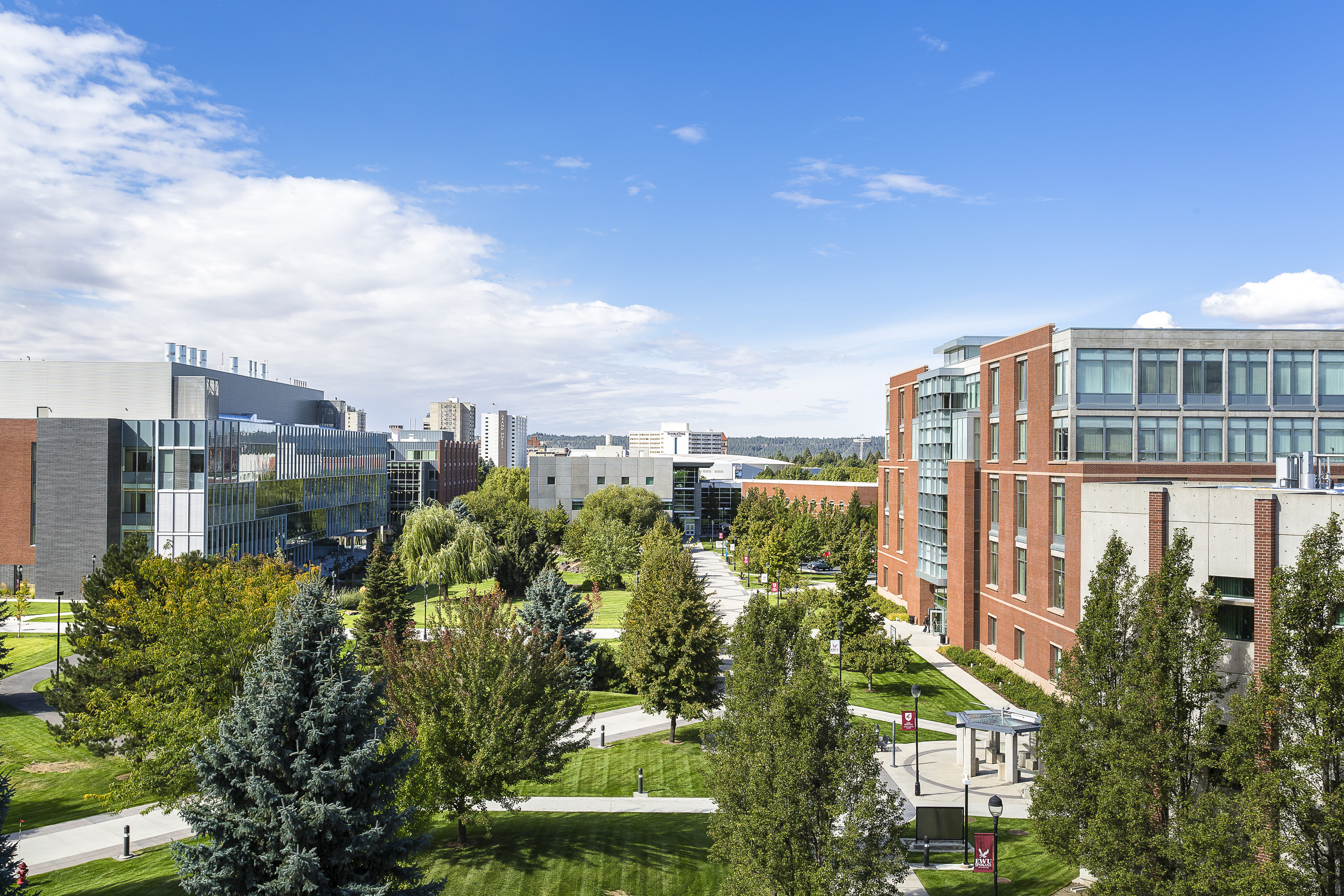
The WSU Health Sciences campus in the University District

Located directly east of Downtown Spokane, the University District is the westernmost portion of East Central. It stretches from Sprague Avenue in the south across the Spokane River into the Logan neighborhood to the north, with Division Street on the west separating it from downtown. Washington State University and Eastern Washington University have campuses in the East Central portion of the University District, while Gonzaga University lies across the river in Logan. This is the most directly connected portion of East Central to the city center of Spokane. A pedestrian bridge leading from Sprague Avenue at Sherman Street was built in 2019 to connect the southern portion of the district with the main campus areas, which are separated by BNSF Railway that is impassable at surface level. The bridge, which boasts a 120 foot tall arch at its center, was named Project of the Year in 2021 by the American Public Works Association. The pedestrian connection between the southern and northern portions of the district has helped spur multiple development projects in the formerly cut-off southern section. The Catalyst Building, adjacent to the bridge, was opened in 2020 is a net-zero emission building housing Eastern Washington University classrooms as well as environmental and technological research organizations.

== History ==
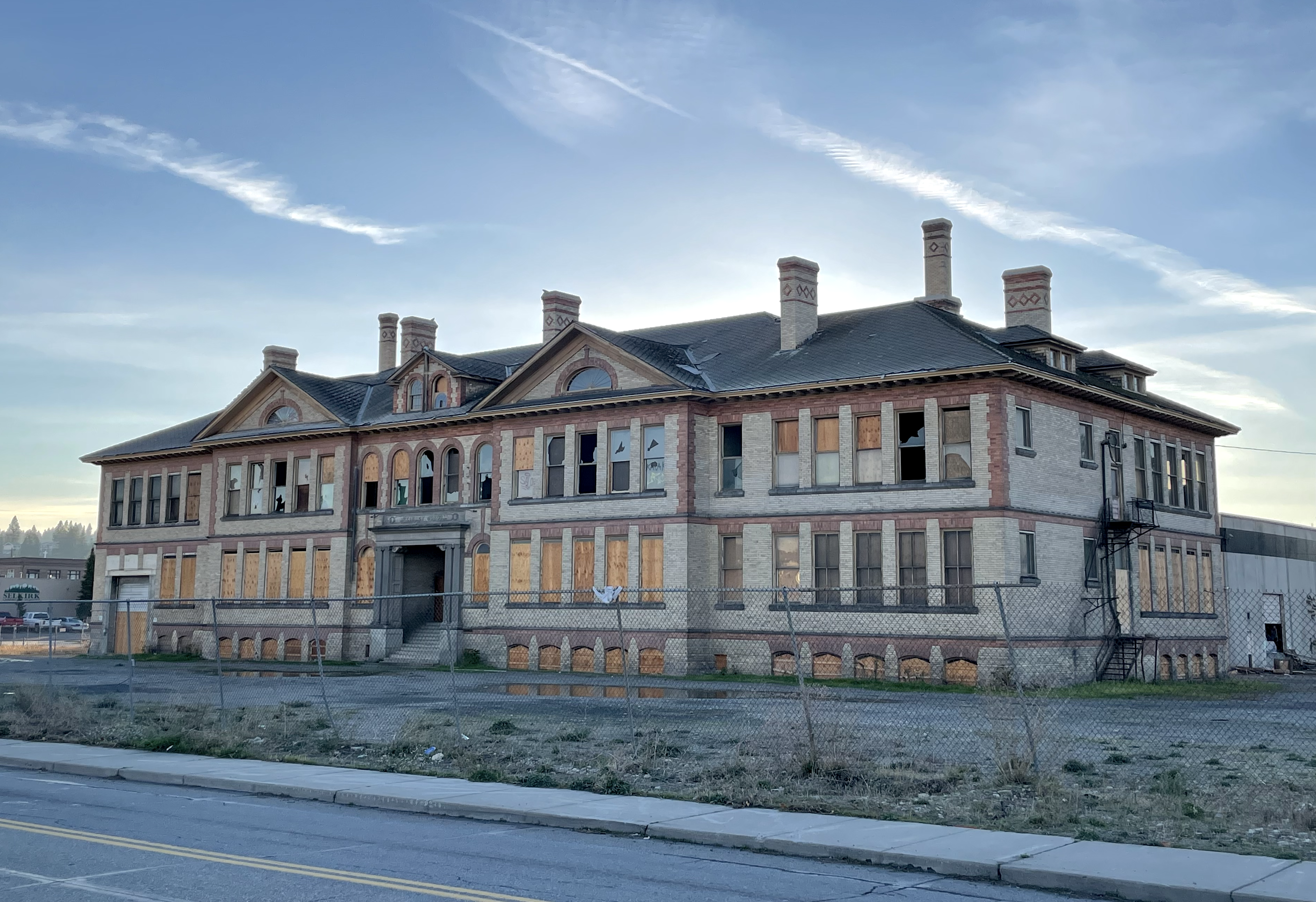
The abandoned McKinley School in the Sprague Union District.

East Central was originally a working class suburb developed early on in Spokane's history, but successive bouts of bad economic luck hit the neighborhood following World War I, then during the Great Depression, and again in the 1950s. During the 1920s, much effort was made by local entrepreneurs to capitalize on the neighborhoods advantageous position along Sprague Avenue and between downtown Spokane and the suburban farming communities of the Spokane Valley, developing a thriving commercial district for over two decades with many prominent businesses. Italian and African American families were a relatively large demographic in the neighborhood in the first half of the 20th century. Calvary Baptist Church founded in 1890 is the oldest black church congregation in Spokane and has been a staple in the neighborhood since their building at Cowley Street and Third Avenue was constructed in the early 20th century. Another major blow to the community came in 1965, when Interstate 90 was completed and effectively cut the neighborhood in half, and in the East Sprague Business District, also drew traffic and business off of Sprague Avenue. Houses were razed and residents displaced, while churches and other community-building organizations and businesses were forced to close their doors. Further difficulties came with the redevelopment of downtown Spokane in preparation for Expo '74, which saw heavy investment and cleaned up the streets in the Riverside neighborhood, including the city's then red light district centered on West Main Avenue which displaced many of the drug dealers, prostitutes, and transients into East Central along Sprague Avenue. In the decades that followed, the neighborhood gained a stigma of poverty, prostitution and drug use, especially the northern section along Sprague Avenue that was cut off by I-90 from the rest of the neighborhood. By the 1990s the East Sprague business district included a wide variety of businesses such as antique stores, bars, sex shops, strip clubs, and used car lots. According to the Spokane Police Department, 80 percent of all prostitution arrests in the city from April 1996 to January 1998 were made between Havana and Division Street and I-90 and Main Avenue and the neighborhood received a lot of negative publicity following the murder of five sex workers that worked East Sprague by serial killer Robert Lee Yates from 1996-1998.

=== Urban Renewal ===
==== South Perry District ====
In the first decade of the 2000s, city planners set their sights on urban renewal projects within the neighborhood. The first area targeted was the South Perry District. Street construction began in 2007 to install curb bump-outs at crosswalks and bus stops intended to slow traffic on Perry Street, as well as the planting of shade trees, pedestrian lights on the sidewalks, benches and other amenities. More than $900,000 was spent on the project. From 2009 through 2012, six new businesses opened on a stretch of Perry Street spanning from roughly eighth to 12th avenues. The businesses included restaurants, bars and boutiques, among other retailers. The four-plus block stretch of Perry Street quickly became a hub for residents of the immediate and surrounding neighborhood.

In the years prior to the investments made by the city, the local community in the South Perry District had begun organizing community events like the weekly Thursday Market farmers market and the annual South Perry Street Fair.

==== East Sprague ====
After addressing the South Perry District, the city shifted its focus to the northern section of the neighborhood, on the other side of I-90. In 2013, city officials proposed taking the approach used in South Perry and applying it to East Sprague Avenue. By late 2016, $17 million worth of investment was underway or planned in what the East Sprague business district began calling the "International District". The city of Spokane would go on to spend $11 million on top of that to redevelop Sprague Avenue, much in the way it did with Perry Street. The roadway was reduced from two lanes in each direction to one, with a center turning lane. Bus stops were given curb kick-outs, which slowed traffic. Following the redevelopment, the district sought a more fitting name and rebranded itself again as the "Sprague Union District" in 2017, invoking a past when it was a manufacturing zone called "Union Park" in the late 19th and early 20th century and frequented by working-class immigrant laborers. Sprague Avenue had long been a major arterial, and still is to this day, but speeds are slower and more emphasis is paid to those who are traveling into and out of the neighborhood than simply passing through it. The project, which spans from Division Street on the West, the neighborhood's border with Downtown Spokane, and Stone Street on the East, roughly two miles apart, was completed in late 2021.

The process of urban renewal continues, however. Numerous abandoned buildings still dot the area surrounding Sprague Avenue as of November 2021, including the historic McKinley School pictured above. Plans to redevelop the structure have been floated and changed numerous times over recent years, but none have stuck.

=== Historic places ===
East Central is home to seven properties listed on the National Register of Historic Places.

	Name on the Register	Image	Date listed	Location	Description
1	Cambern Dutch Shop Windmill	Cambern Dutch Shop Windmill	March 16, 1989 (#89000213)	S. 1102 Perry; 47°38′43″N 117°23′20″W	Built circa 1929.
2	Dodd House	Dodd House	July 3, 2010 (#10000417)	603 S. Arthur St. 47°39′03″N 117°23′41″W	
3	Frequency Changing Station	Frequency Changing Station	June 19, 1979 (#79002556)	E. 1420 Celesta Ave. 47°39′06″N 117°23′14″W	Built in 1908.
4	The Globe Hotel	The Globe Hotel	December 17, 1998 (#97001080)	204 N. Division St. 47°39′34″N 117°24′35″W	Built in 1908.
5	Schade Brewery	Schade Brewery	December 8, 1994 (#94001441)	E. 528 Trent Ave. 47°39′40″N 117°24′05″W	Originally built 1902-03, additional construction was in 1907 and 1934–1937.
6	Spokane & Inland Empire Railroad Car Facility	Spokane & Inland Empire Railroad Car Facility	September 10, 2010 (#10000749)	800 E. Spokane Falls Blvd. 47°39′42″N 117°23′52″W	
7	Spokane Public Library	Spokane Public Library	August 3, 1982 (#82004290)	25 Altamont St. 47°39′24″N 117°22′26″W	Carnegie Libraries of Washington TR

== Demographics ==
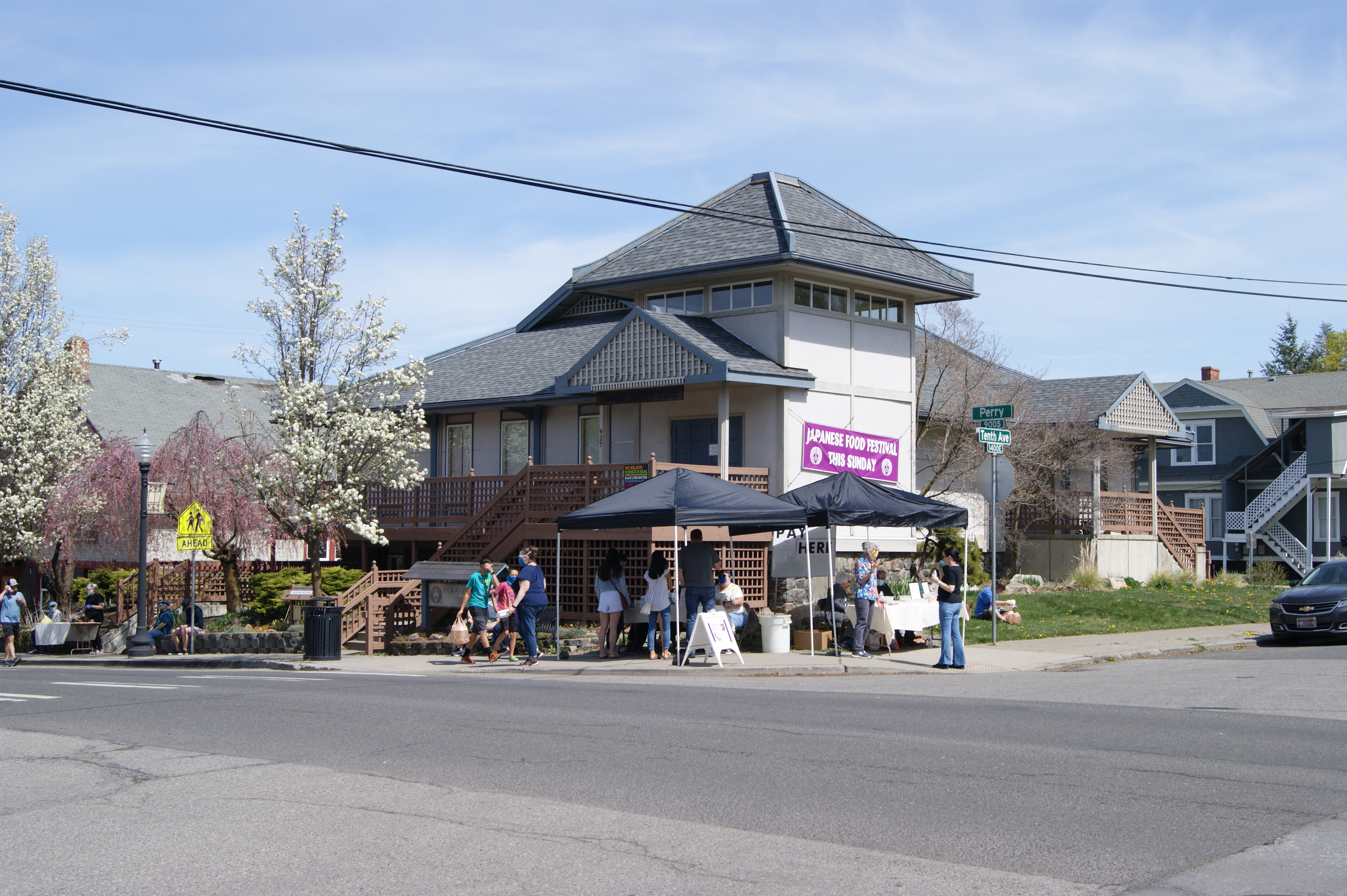
Spokane Buddhist Temple

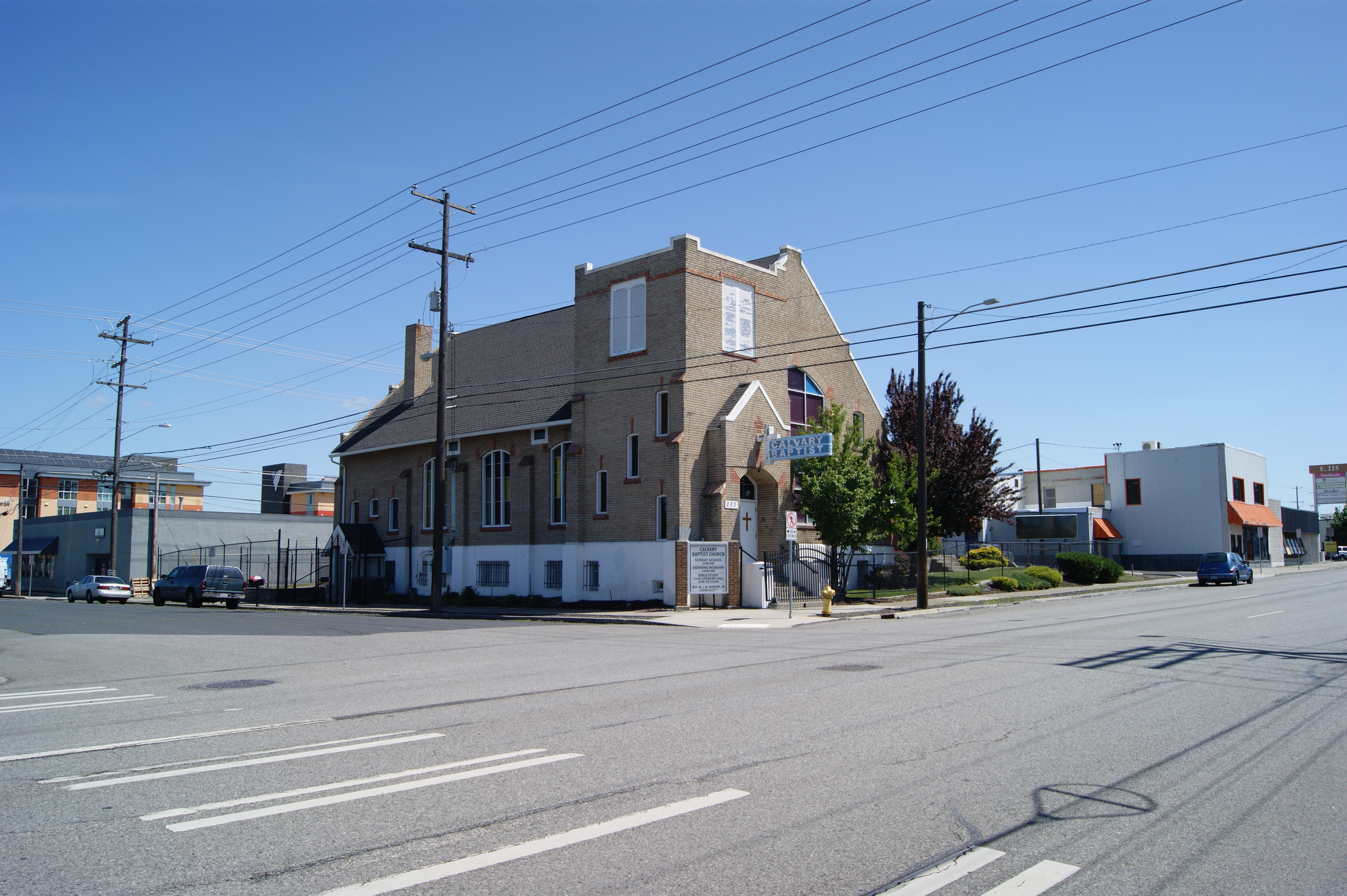
Calvary Baptist Church was the first black church in Spokane and is a hub for the African American community

As of 2017, 12,126 people live in East Central across 4,464 households, 23% of which have children. 27.1% of residents are age 19 or under while 10.4% are age 65 or above. 23.3% of the population are people of color. The median household income is $38,326 and 8.9% of the population is unemployed. 48.1% of households are rented. Of the population, 25.6% have a high school diploma as their highest education while 22.5% have a bachelor's degree or beyond. 89.5% of residents were born in the United States or its territories. Of those who were not, 11% were from Vietnam, 9% from Russia, 8.8% from Ukraine and 8.4% from Canada.

== Education ==
East Central is home to multiple higher education institutions in the University District area, including campuses of Washington State University, Eastern Washington University as well as a medical school facility operated jointly by the University of Washington and Gonzaga University that is set to open in 2022.

Spokane Public Schools serves East Central. Stevens Elementary, located in the adjacent Chief Garry Park neighborhood, serves the neighborhood from its eastern boundary to Altamont Street, north of Interstate 90. Stevens feeds into Yasuhara Middle School in the adjacent Logan neighborhood and then North Central High School.

Sheridan Elementary is located in the eastern portion of the neighborhood and serves East Central east of Altamont, with the exception of some portions of the Underhill Park district, which feed into Franklin Elementary in the neighboring Lincoln Heights neighborhood. Both Sheridan and Franklin feed into Chase Middle School, also in Lincoln Heights, and then Joel E. Ferris High School.

Grant Elementary is located in the western portion of the neighborhood and serves East Central south of Interstate 90 from Altamont west to Sherman. West of Sherman, East Central is served by Roosevelt Elementary in the adjacent Cliff/Cannon neighborhood. Both Grant and Roosevelt feed into Sacajawea Middle School in the Comstock neighborhood and then into Lewis and Clark High School.

The Libby Center, a former middle school a block south of Sprague, is home to gifted programs for elementary and middle school students and a language immersion program run by Spokane Public Schools.

== Transportation ==
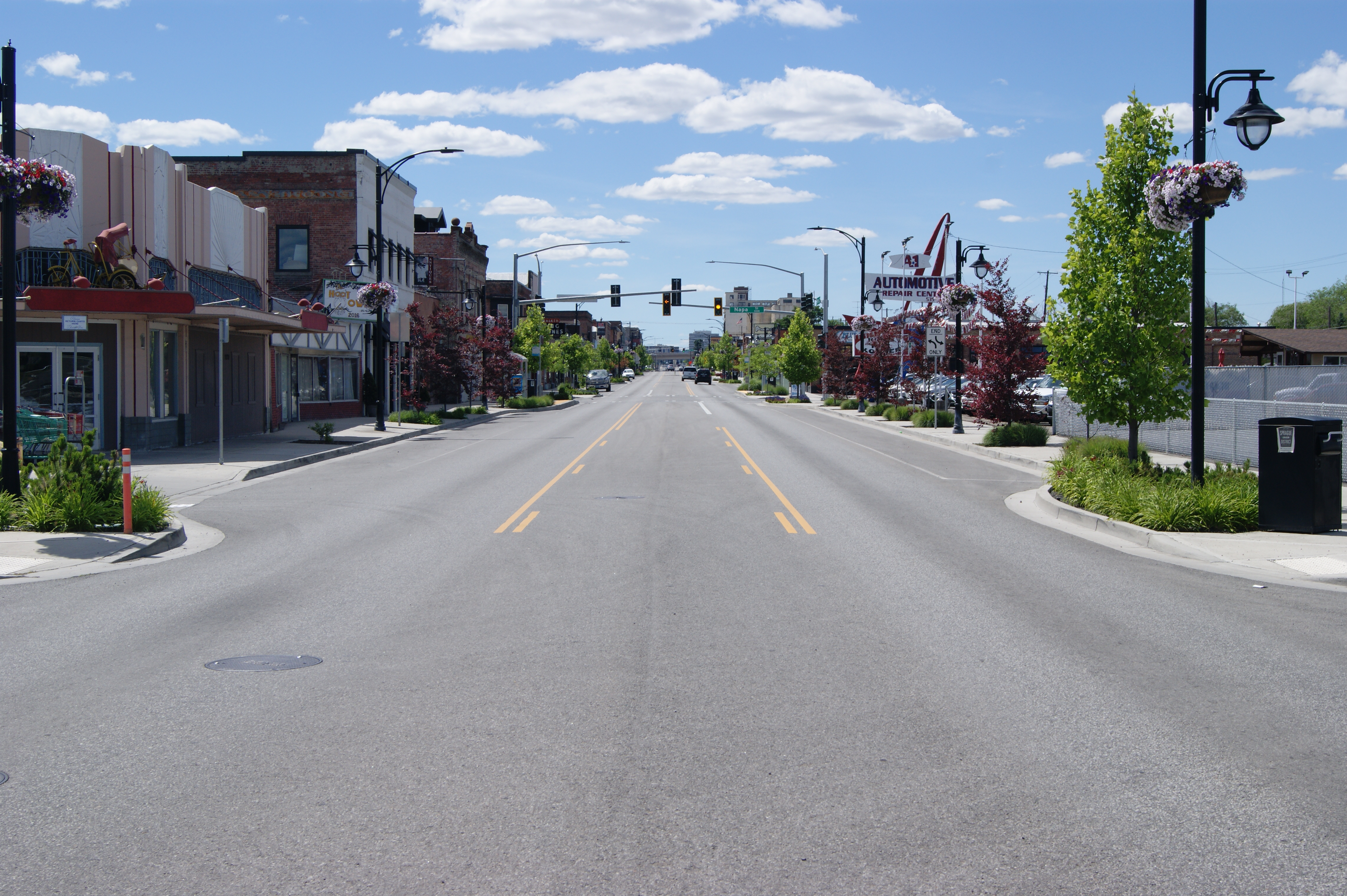
Sprague Avenue in 2021 looking west

=== Highway ===
- - Interstate 90 - to Coeur d'Alene (east) and Spokane (west)

I-90 passes through East Central as a limited-access highway.

- - U.S. 2 - to Newport (north) and Spokane (south)

U.S. 2 passes north–south as the western boundary of East Central along Division Street.

- - U.S. 395 - to Colville (north) and Spokane (south)

U.S. 395 passes north–south as the western boundary of East Central along Division Street.

- - State Route 290 - to Spokane (west) and Idaho State Highway 53 (east)

WA 290 passes east–west as the northern boundary of East Central along Trent Avenue.

=== Surface Streets ===
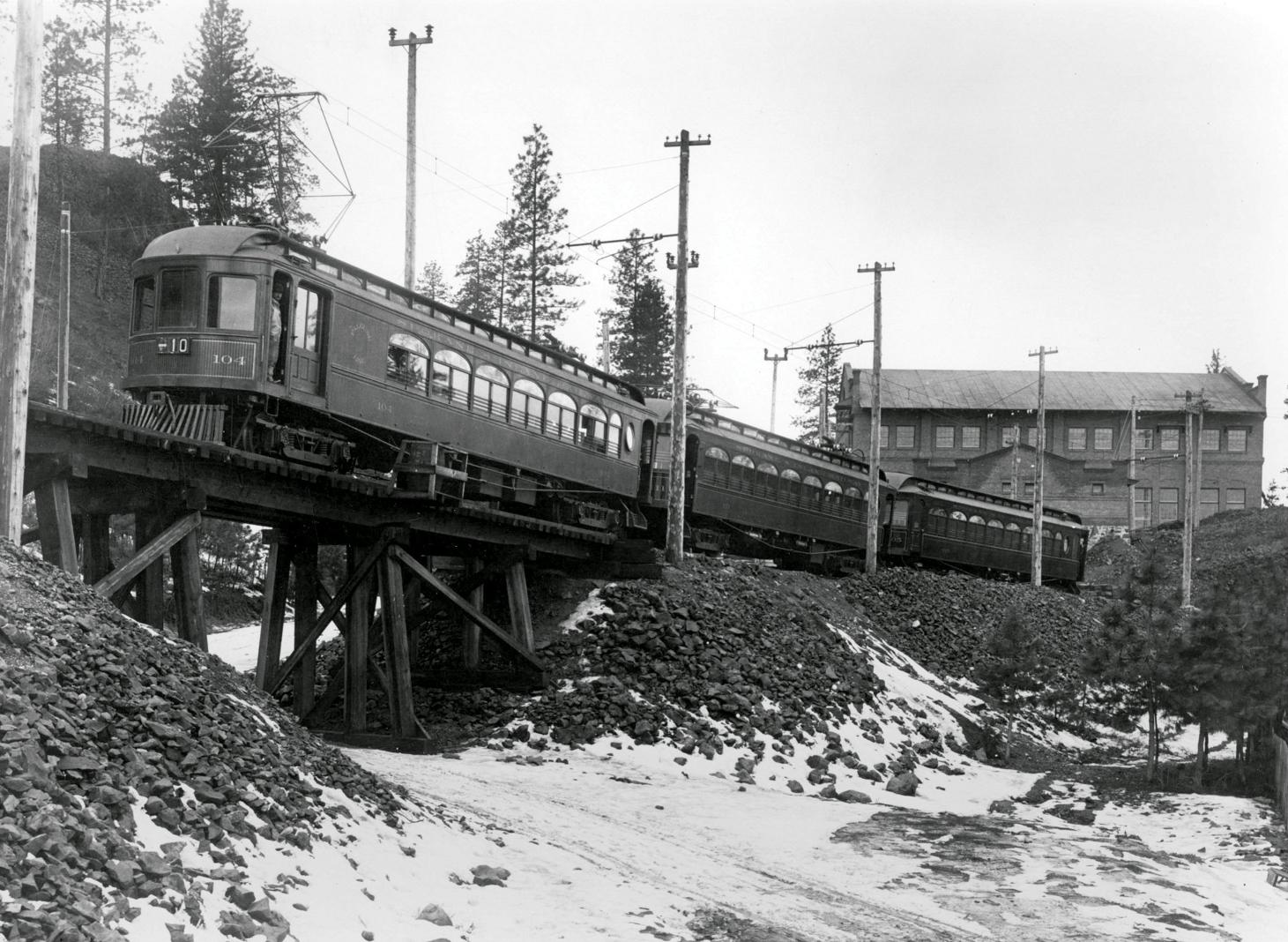
The Spokane and Inland Empire Railroad in 1910, now the path of the Ben Burr Trail, with the Frequency Changing Station in the background

Roads classified as urban principle arterials, the highest classification of arterials in the city, include Division Street on the east and Sprague Avenue, which passes through the heart of the neighborhood going east to west. Trent Avenue, which carries Washington State Route 290 and the Thor/Freya couplet are classified as urban principle arterials as well. South Perry, 9th Avenue, 3rd Avenue, 2nd Avenue, Altamont Street, Napa Street, Havana Street and Hartson Avenue are all classified as urban minor arterials.

Interstate 90 passes through East Central, with exits located at Division Street, State Route 290, Second Avenue, Altamont Street and Freya Street. The Interstate runs at grade, and severed the street grid connections when the road was constructed. There are pedestrian and cyclist overpasses located at Magnolia Street and Regal Street. Perry Street, Altamont Street and Havana Street all pass under the freeway while Thor and Freya pass over it.

The Ben Burr Trail runs along a ridge from the top of Underhill Park through Liberty Park, where it passes under the interchange of Interstate 90 and State Route 290 and then connects with the Spokane River Centennial Trail in the University District. It follows the path of the old Spokane and Inland Empire Railroad track. The Frequency Changing Station building remains to this day along the trail.

=== Public Transit ===
The Spokane Transit Authority, the region's public transportation provider, serves East Central with seven fixed schedule bus lines.

Route	Termini			Service operation and notes	Streets traveled
1; City Line	Browne's Addition	↔	Chief Garry Park; Spokane Community College at Bay	Bus Rapid Transit route	Pacific, 1st Ave, Wall St, Main Ave, Pine, Spokane Falls Blvd, Cincinnati, Mission Ave, Riverside Ave, Sprague Ave, 2nd Ave
25; Division	Downtown Spokane; STA Plaza	↔	Fairwood; Hastings Park & Ride	High-frequency route	Division/Ruby couplet
9; Sprague	Downtown Spokane; STA Plaza	↔	Spokane Valley; Valley Transit Center	High-frequency route	Sprague
6; Cheney	University District; Spokane Teaching Health Clinic; Washington State University Spokane	↔	Cheney; Eastern Washington University	Basic-frequency route	Front, Spokane Falls, Browne/Division, Riverside/Sprague, STA Plaza, Jefferson, Jefferson Park & Ride, I-90, West Plains Transit Center, WA 904, Betz, 6th, Elm, Washington, K Street Transit Station
26; Lidgerwood	Downtown Spokane; STA Plaza	↔	Shiloh Hills; Northpointe Shopping Center	Basic-frequency route	Martin Luther King, Pine, Spokane Falls, Hamilton
28; Nevada	Downtown Spokane; STA Plaza	↔	Country Homes; Whitworth University	Basic-frequency route	Martin Luther King, Pine, Spokane Falls, Hamilton
45; Perry District	Downtown Spokane; STA Plaza	↔	Lincoln Heights; South Hill Park & Ride	Basic-frequency route	Second/Third couplet, Arthur, Newark, Perry
94; East Central/Millwood	Downtown Spokane; STA Plaza	↔	Millwood; West Valley High School	Basic-frequency route	Second/Third couplet, Magnolia, Fifth, Havana
12; Southside Medical Shuttle	University District; Gateway Bridge	↔	Downtown Spokane; STA Plaza	Shuttle route	Gateway Bridge, Cancer Care Northwest, Rockwood Clinic, Inland Imaging, St. Luke's, Sacred Heart, Heart Institute, Eye Clinic, Deaconess, STA Plaza
