= Nine Mile Dam =

Coordinates: 47°46′33″N 117°32′46″W

- Nine Mile Hydroelectric Power Plant Historic District
- U.S. National Register of Historic Places
- U.S. Historic district
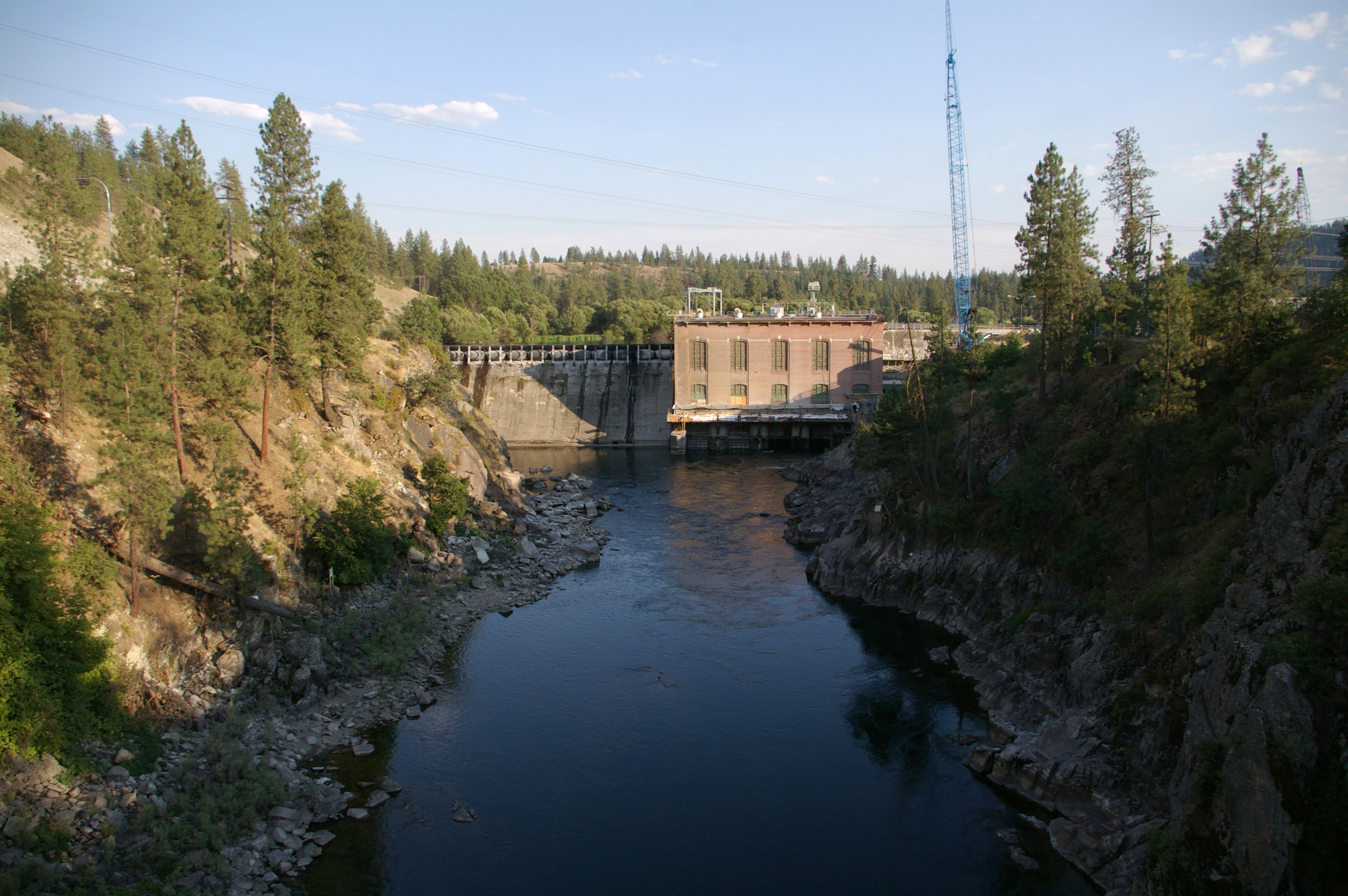

- Location within Washington (state) Location within the United States
- Nearest city: Nine Mile Falls, Washington
- Area: less than one acre
- Built: 1908
- Architect: Sanderson & Porter; Zimmerman, William F.
- Architectural style: Bungalow/American Craftsman, vernacular industrial
- MPS: Hydroelectric Power Plants in Washington State, 1890--1938 MPS
- NRHP reference No.: 90001861
- Added to NRHP: December 6, 1990

Nine Mile Falls Dam is a dam on the Spokane River, in the unincorporated community of Nine Mile Falls, Washington. It was built on the site of the falls in 1908, creating Nine Mile Reservoir. The dam was designed by the New York engineering firm of Sanderson & Porter, and originally constructed to satisfy the power needs of the Spokane and Inland Empire Railroad interurban trolley lines.

Washington Water Power (now the power company Avista) purchased the site in 1925, and continues to operate it as one of its six hydroelectric generating plants on the Spokane River. The 58-foot-high cyclopean masonry dam and its powerhouse, storehouse, ten cottages and other structures were placed on the National Register of Historic Places in 1990.

== Historic district ==
The dam, powerhouse and ten adjacent cottages were added to the National Register of Historic Places in 1990.

The cottages were built in 1928 and 1929 by Washington Water Power as housing for the dam's employees. At the time, the Nine Mile area was remote relative to the residential areas of Spokane, though by the 1990s when the district was added to the NRHP, suburban development had reached the area. The cottages are one-story buildings with large front porches. Each cottage is constructed with brick and features a low-pitched side-gabled roof. Architecturally, the cottages are split between Craftsman and English Cottage styles. In the interior, each cottage consists of three bedrooms, a kitchen, bathroom and living room. Each cottage features a small garage in the back yard. They sit along a tree-line<d road which connects them to the powerhouse in the southwest. They are located on the downstream side of the dam, on a basalt bluff which rises above the river.

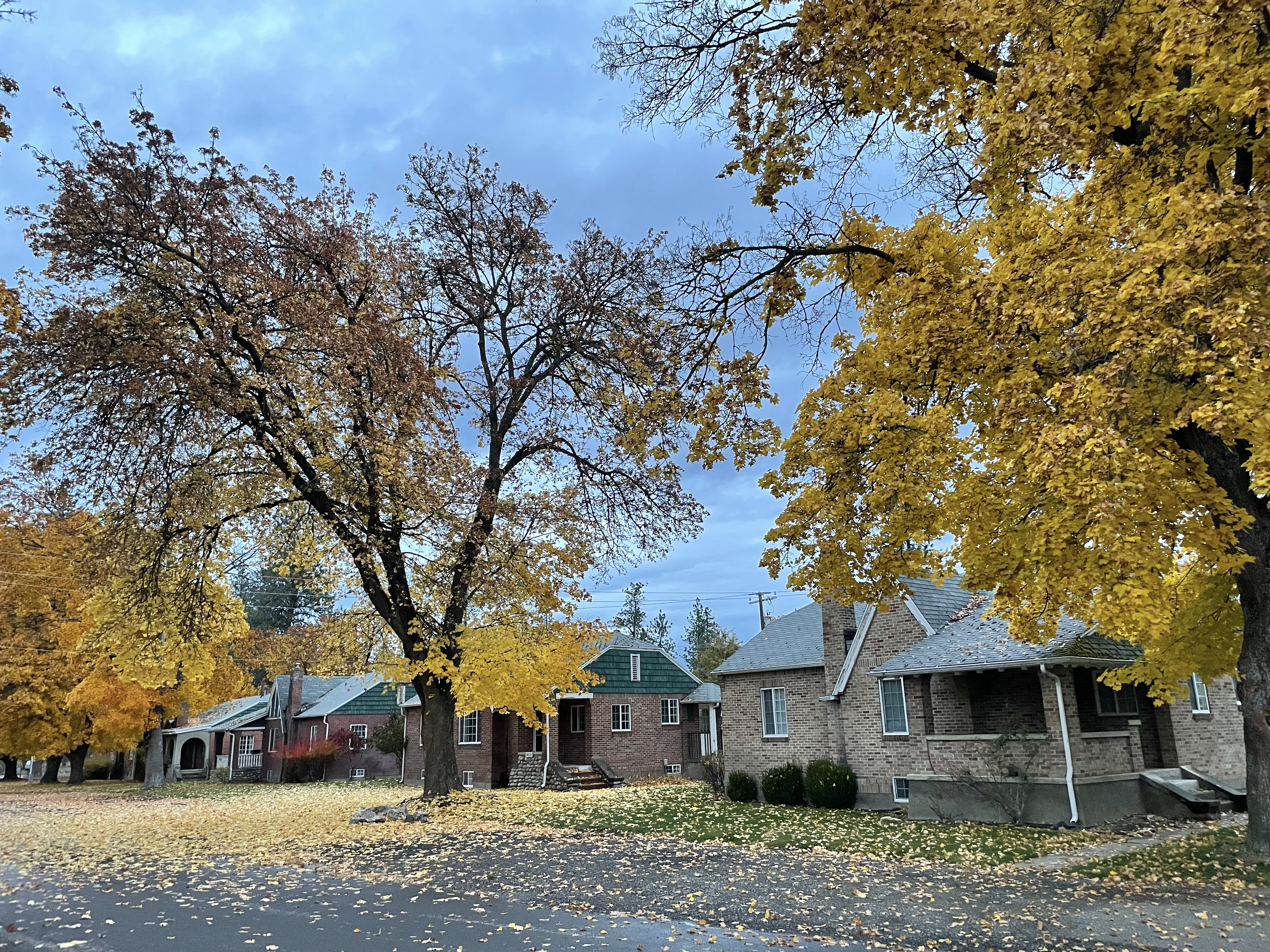
Cottages from the street

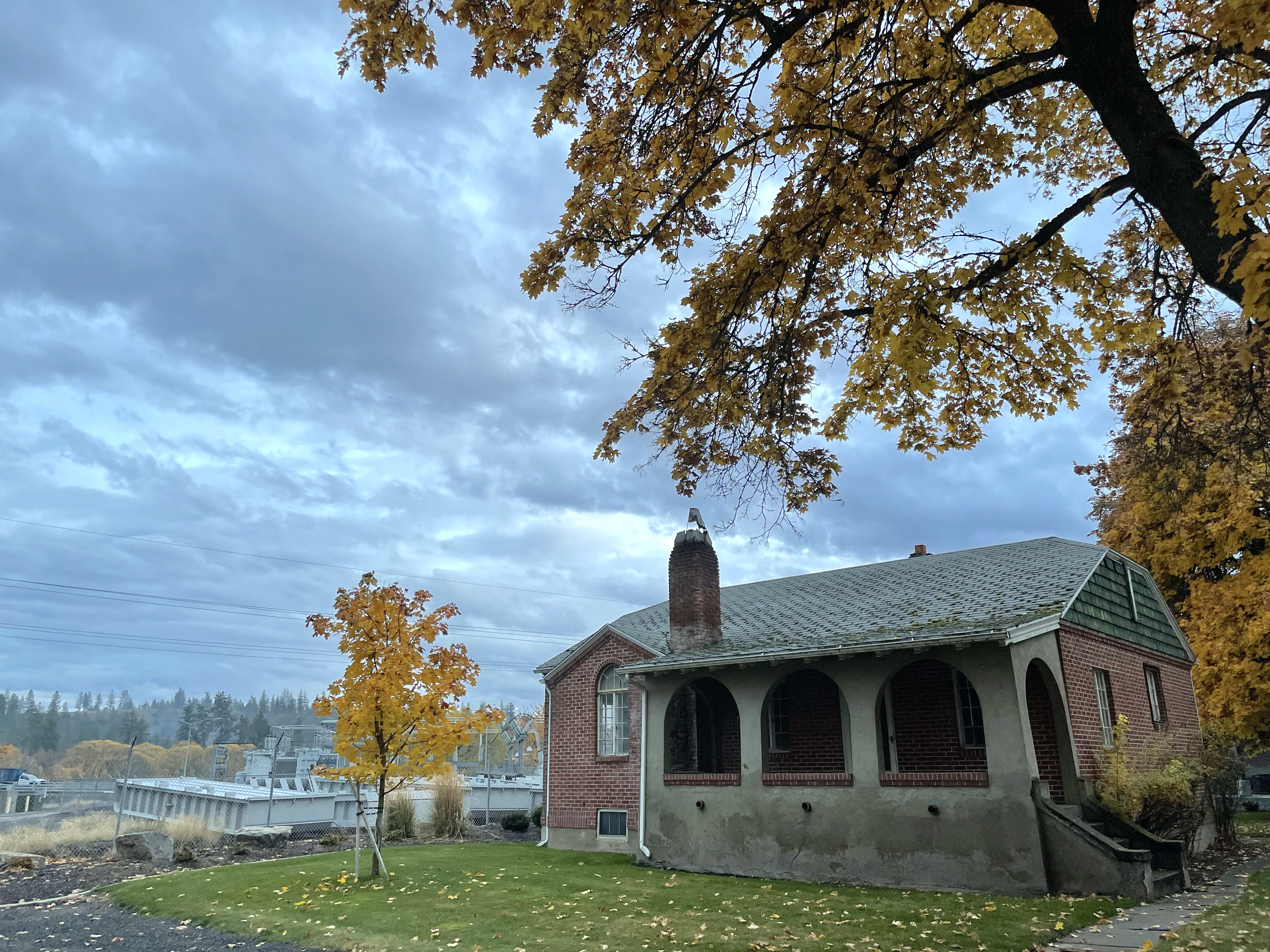
Cottage with powerhouse in rear

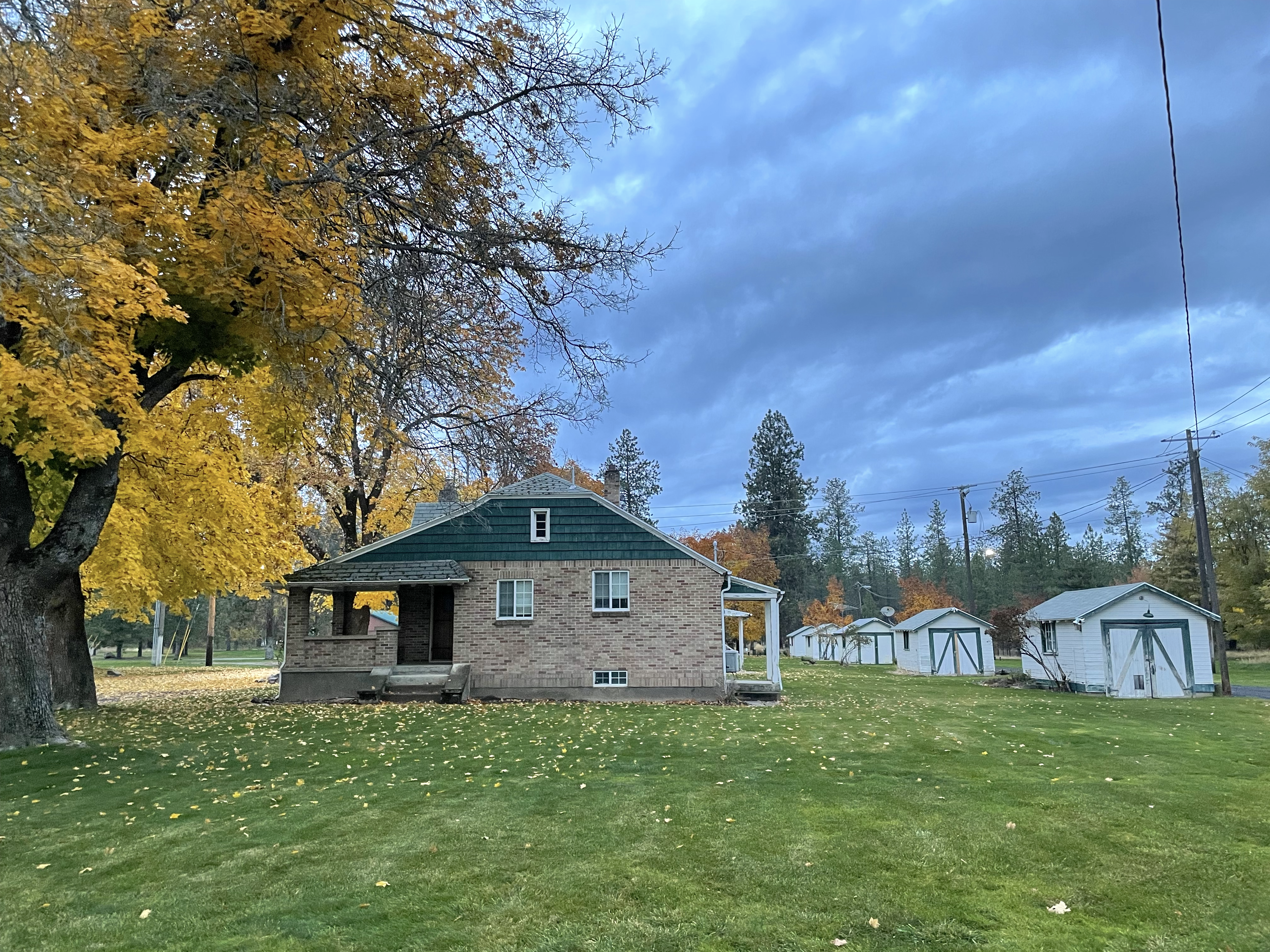
Cottage showing lawn and garages

== See also ==
- List of dams in the Columbia River watershed
