= Frequency Changing Station =

- U.S. National Register of Historic Places
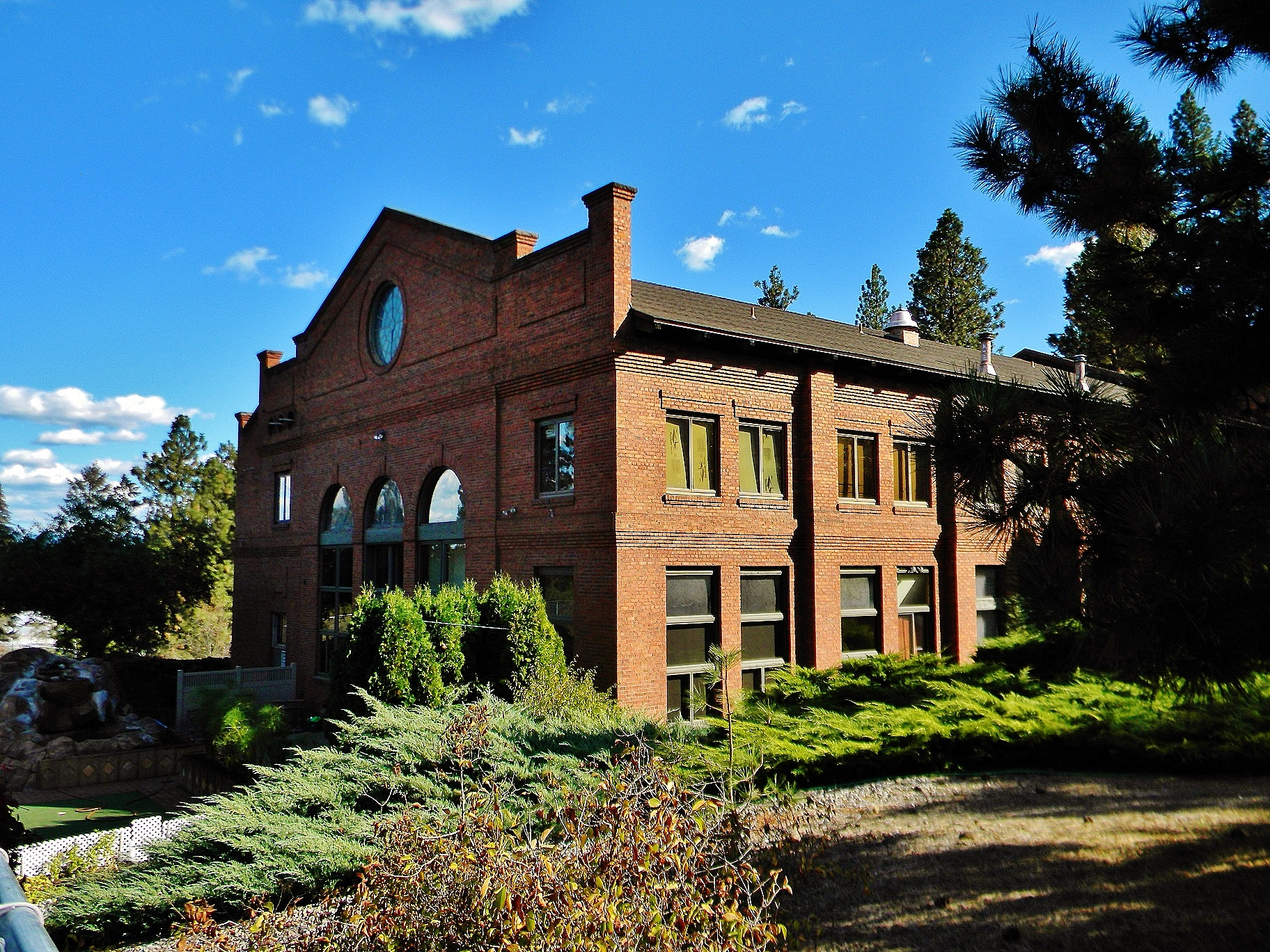

- Location within Washington (state) Location within the United States
- Location: E. 1421 Celesta Ave., Spokane, Washington
- Coordinates: 47°39′6″N 117°23′14″W
- Area: less than one acre
- Built: 1908
- Architect: Albert Held
- NRHP reference No.: 79002556
- Added to NRHP: June 19, 1979

The Frequency Changing Station in East Central, Spokane, Washington is a building listed on the National Register of Historic Places. It was built by the Spokane and Inland Empire Railroad in 1908 to house electrical equipment used by the electric railway. Power was generated at the Nine Mile Falls dam and transmitted to the Frequency Changing Station. The station provided direct current to the streetcar network within the city of Spokane. To provide power to the rail network outside Spokane, the station converted a portion of the power to alternating current and fed it to a series of electrical substations spaced about 15 miles (24 km) on the operating line. The substations then converted power back to direct current for the streetcars, but also sold power at 110 volts AC to the communities.

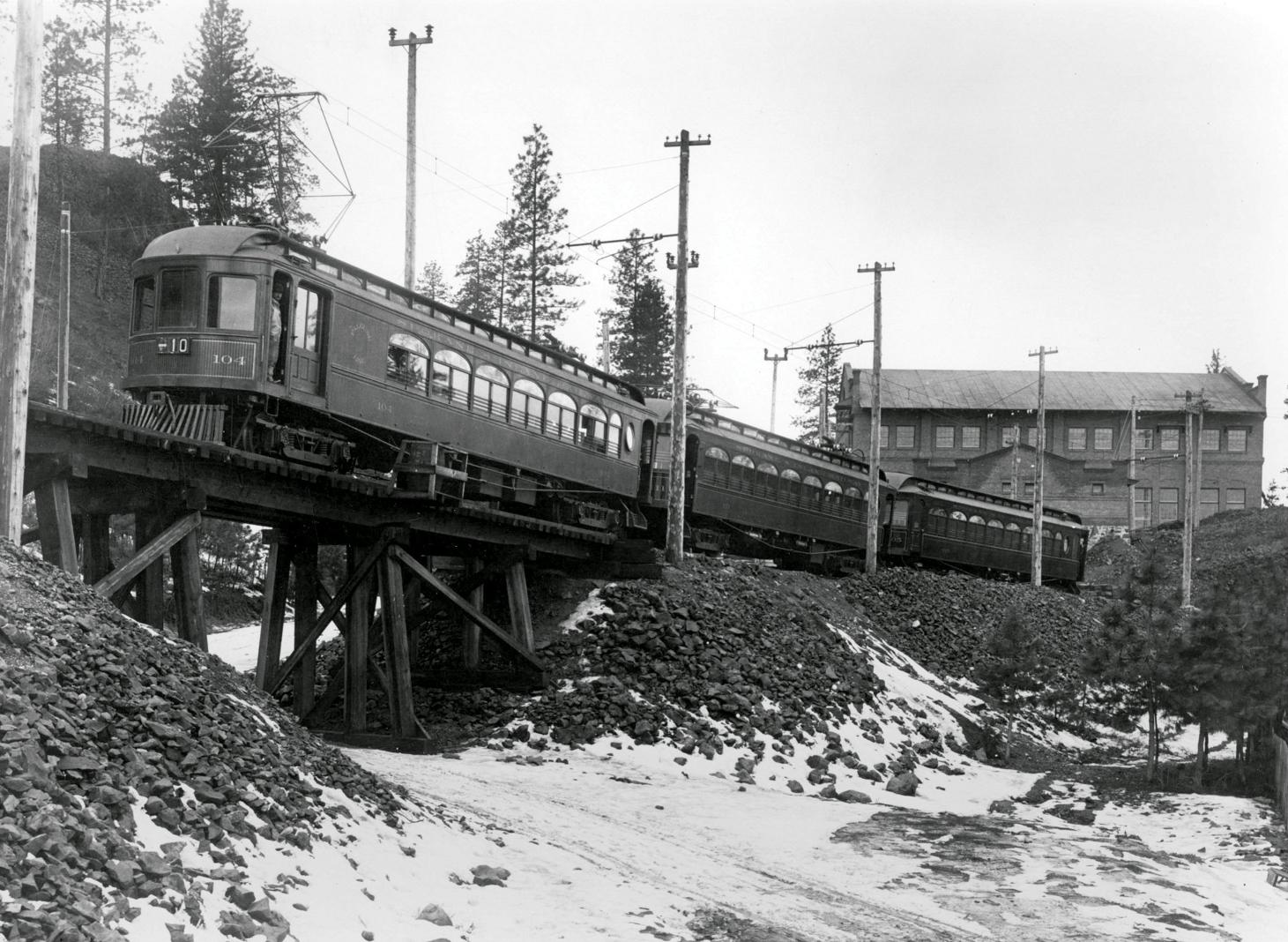
Frequency Changing Station in 1910 with Spokane and Inland Empire Railroad in the foreground

The main station housed four motor-generator sets, four 1250 kilowatt transformers, three 375 kilowatt transformers, and three 75 kilowatt transformers. The east wing of the station contained a 550-volt, 275-cell storage battery. All of this electrical equipment was removed around 1939, when the owning railroad sold the property.

The railroad connected the cities of Colfax, Washington and Moscow, Idaho to Spokane, and the electric railway figured heavily in the rapid development of the area where it passed.

In the decades since the railroad sold the property, the building has served multiple purposes. By the 1970s it was being used as storage for a boat dealership. At that time, it was renovated and turned into condominium housing. As of 2012, it is still used as housing.
