= Spokane and Inland Empire Railroad =

Interuban railway in Washington State, U.S.

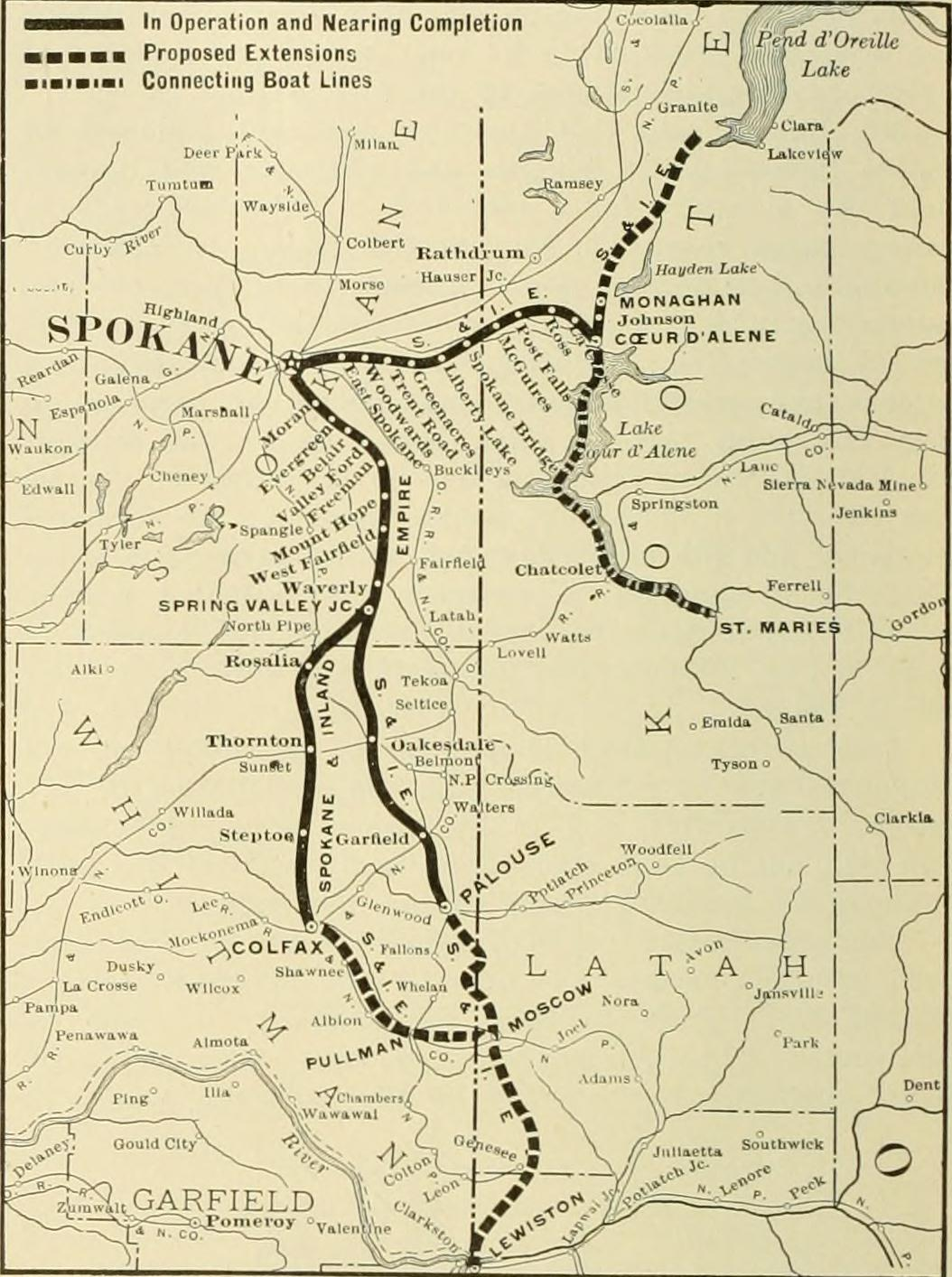
- System map of the Spokane and Inland Empire Railway. (1906)

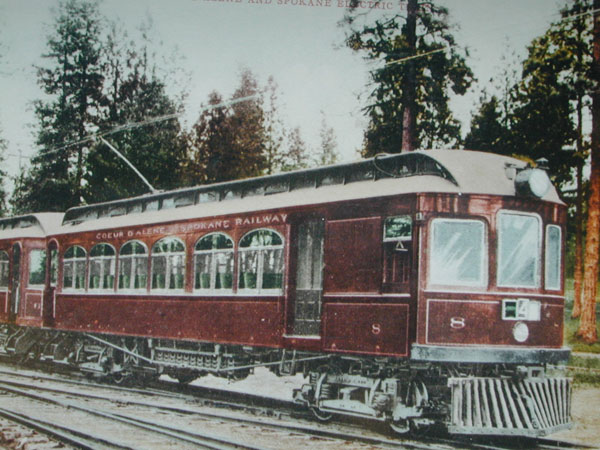
- Spokane and Inland Empire Railway No. 8. near Coeur d'Alene. Built by J. G. Brill. (1910)

Overview
- Headquarters: Spokane, Washington
- Reporting mark: S&IE
- Locale: Spokane, Washington to Coeur d'Alene, Idaho, and vicinity Palouse area
- Dates of operation: 1906–1929
- Successor: Great Northern Railway; Spokane United Railways

Technical
- Track gauge: 4 ft 8 1/2 in (1,435 mm) standard gauge

The Spokane and Inland Empire Railroad Company (S.&I.E.R.R.Co.) was a railroad company that operated an electric streetcar system in Spokane, Washington and an electrified interurban railway extending beyond Spokane into the Palouse region and northern Idaho. The raildroad company also constructed and operated a central terminal building and Nine Mile Dam.The system originated in several predecessor roads beginning in 1888, was incorporated in 1906, and ran under its own name to 1929. It merged into the Great Northern Railway and later, the Burlington Northern Railroad, which operated some roads into the 1980s.

== History ==
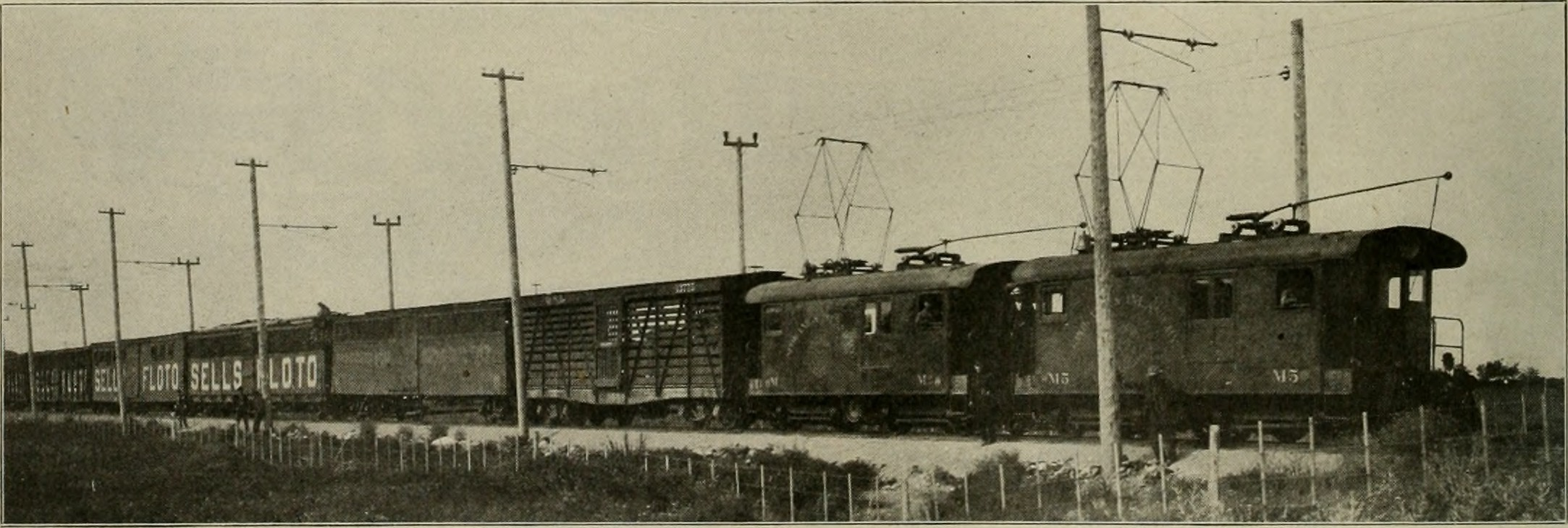
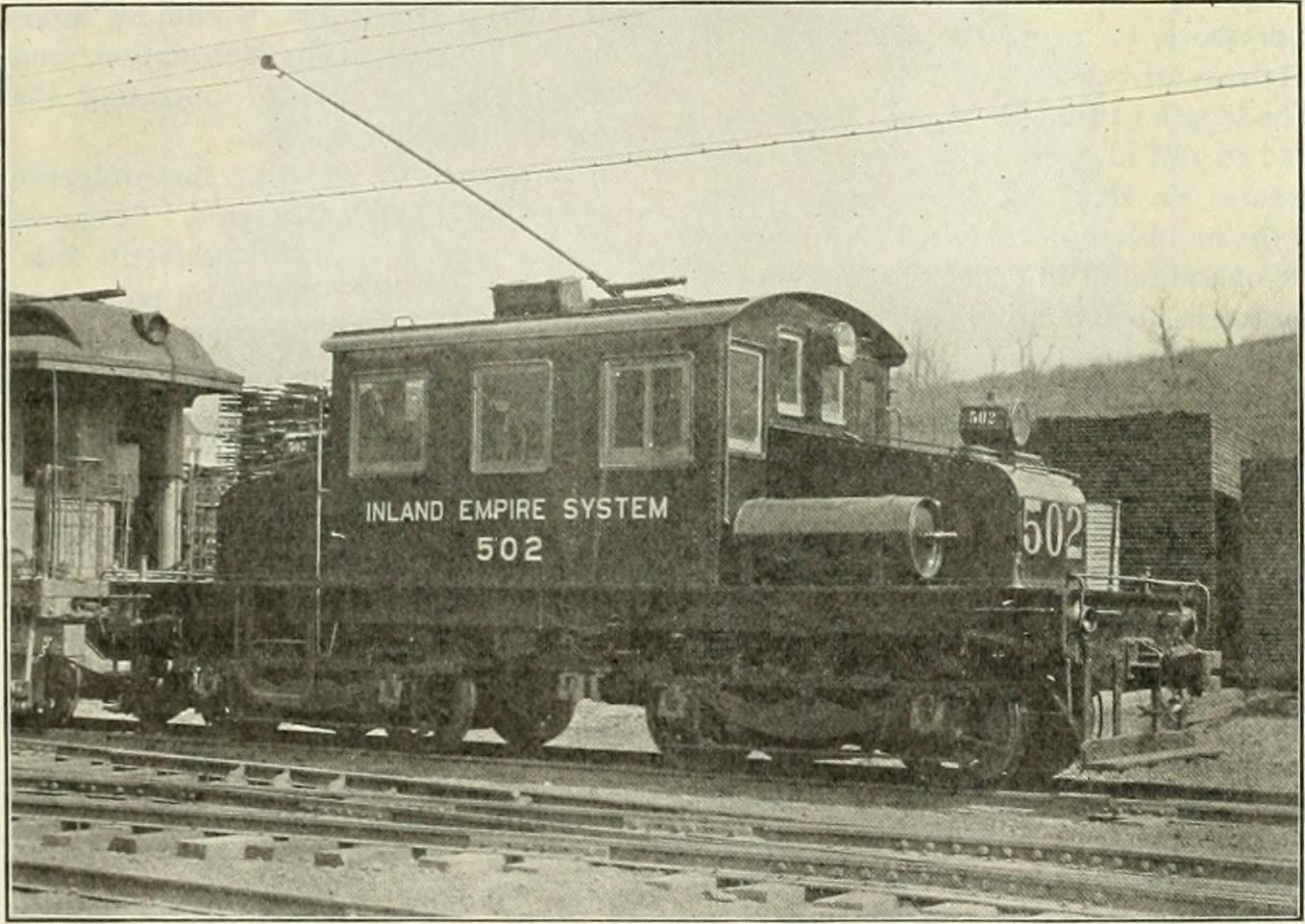
A Spokane and Inland Empire Railroad freight train (left) and steeplecab (right)

One of the earliest components of Spokane's early mass transit system was the Spokane and Montrose Street Railway, a narrow-gauge system with the distinction of being the first motorized street railway in Spokane. Originally built by Francis H. Cook (1851–1920), the line defaulted to creditors during the Panic of 1893, who later sold the line to a group of Spokane businessmen headed by Jay P. Graves (1859–1948) in 1902. Prior to this Graves and his partners had bought Cook's foreclosed land holdings in the Spokane area.

Graves and partners from Portland, Oregon, reorganized the Spokane and Montrose as the Spokane Traction Company on February 1, 1903, incorporated it as the Spokane and Inland Empire Railroad Company in 1906, and rebuilt it as a standard gauge line. The routes were extended through various areas of Spokane, including Corbin Park, Hillyard and Lincoln Heights. Initially, power for the line was purchased from the Washington Water Power Company. However, in 1909, Graves built a hydroelectric dam at Nine Mile Falls, Washington. This went on to power not only Spokane Traction and the Spokane and Inland Empire, but also sold surplus power locally.

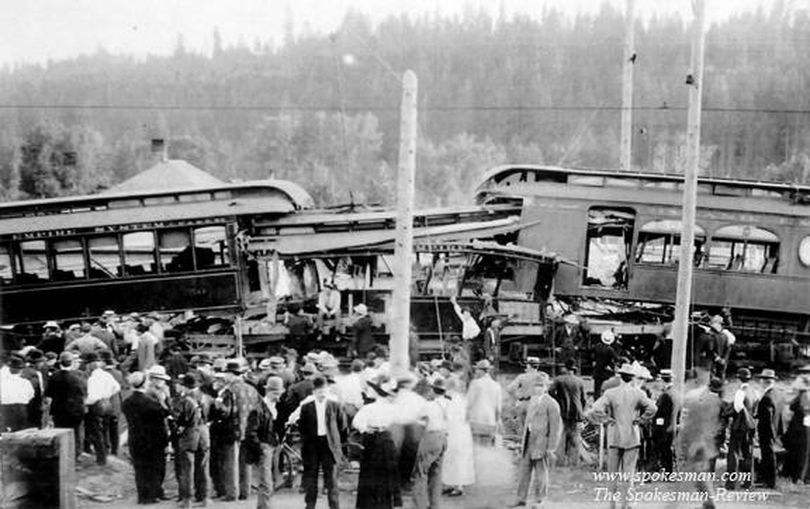
The Spokane and Inland Empire Railroad head-on collision at Gibbs, Idaho killed 16 and injured over 100 on July 31, 1909. This is the deadliest railroad accident in Idaho.

During this same period, Idaho Lumberman Frederick A. Blackwell (1852–1922) organized the Coeur d’Alene and Spokane Railway. Operating in conjunction with the Graves' lines in 1903 it formed a route between Spokane and Lake Coeur d'Alene in northern Idaho. Together, Graves and Blackwell developed properties along this line. "To increase summer and holiday ridership," historian Laura Arksey notes, "Graves and Blackwell opened beaches and amusement parks on Coeur d’Alene, Hayden, and Liberty lakes." The electric railway platform in Coeur d'Alene was built onto the docks to connect with steamboats on Lake Coeur d'Alene.

Blackwell and Graves, together with James J. Hill of the Great Northern Railway, pushed the interurban lines to the south into the Palouse Country, eventually reaching Colfax, Washington, and Moscow, Idaho. This extension was operated under the name Spokane and Inland Empire. In 1908, Spokane Traction was sold to the Spokane and Inland Empire, but operated as a separate division. Hill purchased the Spokane and Inland Empire in 1909, retaining Graves as local president. Spokane and Inland Empire gradually reduced electric-powered passenger operations. In 1909, two Spokane and Inland Empire trains collided head on at Gibbs, Idaho (near Coeur d'Alene) killing 16 people and injuring over 100. This was the deadliest railroad accident in the state of Idaho.

== Spokane, Coeur d'Alene and Palouse ==
According to the Spokane Spokesman-Review, the Spokane and Inland Empire was folded into the Great Northern Railway in 1927. The last electric line run to Moscow was recorded in April 1939, and the last electric line run to Coeur d'Alene came in July 1940.

In his history of the Spokane and Inland Empire, author Clive Carter asserts that although the interurban lines were financially unstable and expensive to operate, the outright purchase was warranted due to the large traffic the lines fed into the Great Northern system. This thinking led Hill to his purchase of the lines in 1909. However, following the Burlington Northern Railroad merger of 1970, the old interurban system was unprofitable and/or redundant (much of it was paralleled by routes of the former Northern Pacific Railway) and the Spokane and Inland Empire system was scrapped almost in its entirety between 1970 and 1985.

== Preservation ==
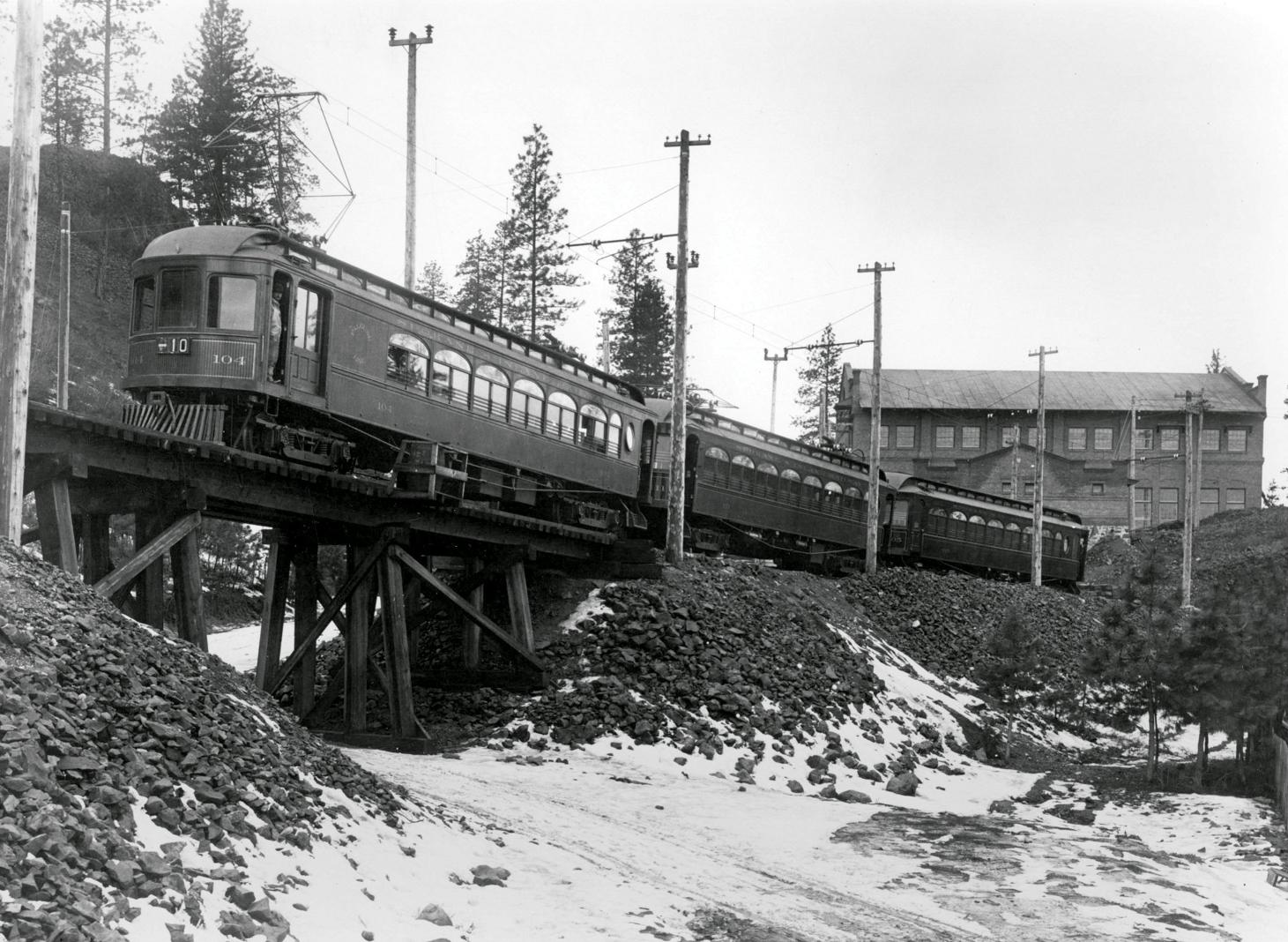
Spokane and Inland Empire Railroad 104. (1910) The South Hill frequency changing station is in background.

The only S&IE piece of equipment left is a lone boxcar at the Inland Northwest Rail Museum in Reardan, WA.

=== Rails to Trails ===
Several Trails incorporate the Spokane and Inland Empire Railroad right-of-way:

- The Centennial Trail between Coeur d'Alene and Spokane often follows the former Spokane and Inland Empire Railroad.
- The Ben Burr Trail follows the Spokane and Inland Empire railway in the Palouse.

=== Preserved Structures ===
Several structures of the Spokane and Inland Empire Railroad still stand:

- The frequency changing station on South Hill still stands and has been converted into condos.
- The substation in Coeur d'Alene still stands and is now the Human Rights Education Institute.
- The car-barns in Spokane are occupied by the office of McKinstry Corp. today.
- The Keisling, WA substation still stands as a private residence.
- The Mt Hope, WA Substation stands as a private residence
- The freight house in Rosalia, WA also still stands.

== See also ==
- Brill Motor Company
- Frequency Changing Station
- Great Northern Railway
- Ohio Match Company Railway
- Spokane, Portland and Seattle Railway
- Westinghouse
