= Gilroy Yamato Hot Springs =

- U.S. National Register of Historic Places
- U.S. Historic district
- California Historical Landmark
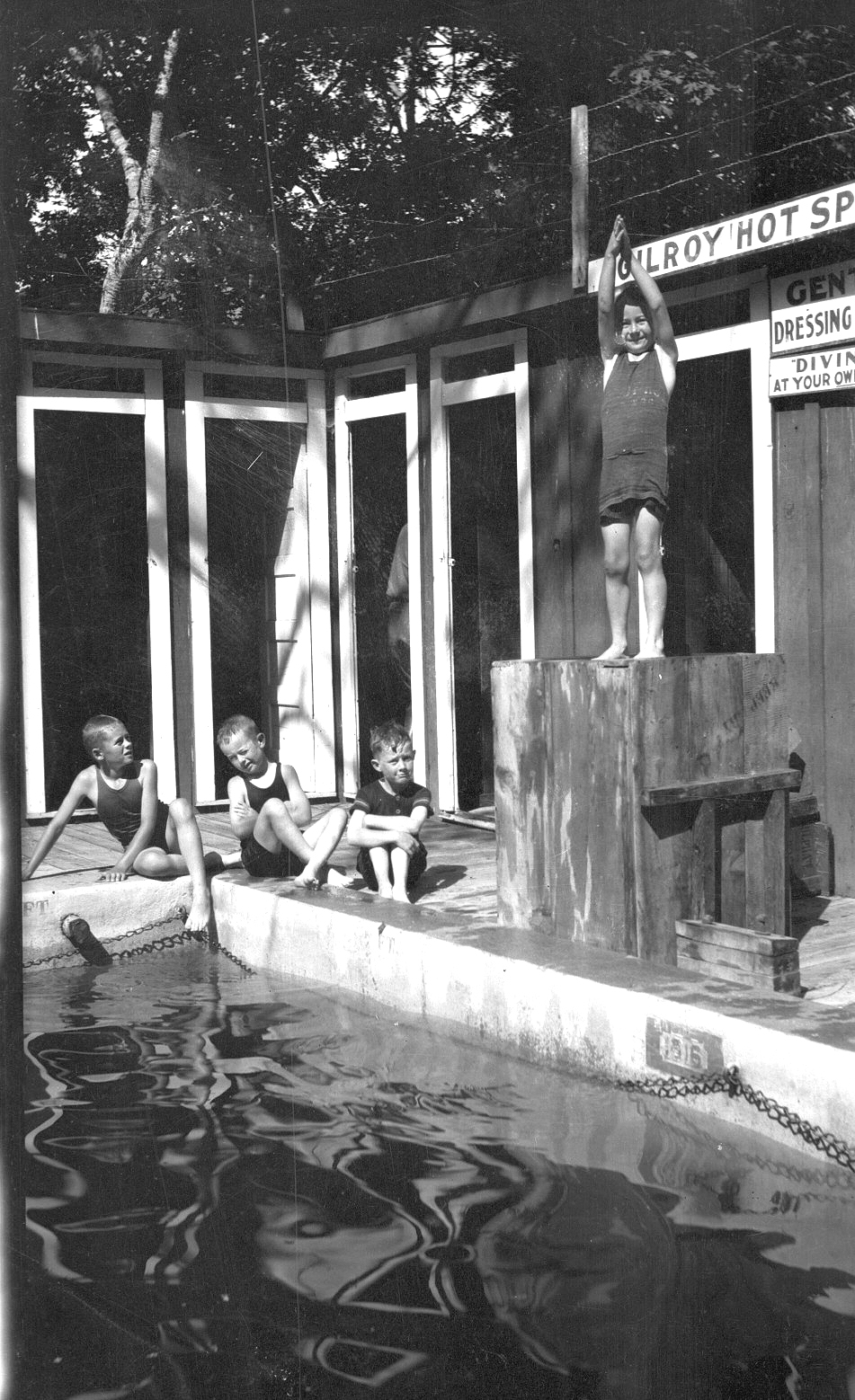
- Gilroy Yamato Hot Springs pool, ca. 1920

- Location within California Location within the United States
- Nearest city: Gilroy, California
- Coordinates: 37°6′30″N 121°28′39″W
- Area: 8 acres (3.2 ha)
- Architectural style: Italianate–Victorian
- NRHP reference No.: 95000996
- CHISL No.: 1017
- Added to NRHP: August 21, 1995

Gilroy Yamato Hot Springs, a California Historical Landmark and on the list of National Register of Historic Places, is a property near Gilroy, California famed for its mineral hot springs and historic development by early settlers and Japanese immigrants. The earliest extant Italianate–Victorian style structures date from the 1870s, and the earliest bathhouse dates from 1890. Other early structures are a Buddhist shrine from 1939 and a Japanese garden teahouse from that same year. The property is also listed on the National Register of Historic Places. The hot spring's temperature ranges from 99° to 111 °F (37° to 44 °C). These springs are the site of occurrence of certain extremophile micro-organisms, that are capable of surviving in extremely hot environments.

== Setting and early history ==
The site is in a mixed oak forest sloping above Coyote Creek approximately ten miles northeast of Gilroy. The locale is associated with the discoveries of Francisco Cantua, while the core landholding of 160 acres (0.65 km^{2}) was purchased in 1866 by early settlers George W. Roop and William F. Olden. Roop could accommodate up to 200 guests per day, and the resort Roop developed achieved rapid fame. In those early times the resort was praised as "the finest springs in the state" (Coffin, 1873). A three-story wood-frame hotel from 1874 and a single-story wood frame clubhouse also dating from the 1870s existed. In the last decade of the 19th century, further development took place: The 1890 bathhouse noted above, several 1890s board and batten guest cabins and a wooden kiosk above one of the hot springs. Notable guests to this historic destination hotel in the Victorian period included San Francisco Mayor James Phelan, gold mining magnate Adolph Sutro, Claus Spreckels and singer Margaret Alverson Blake.

== The Roaring 1920s ==
Further development took place in this vibrant period in American history. Immediately before the Roaring Twenties a redwood water tank was built in 1913 and the first concrete pool for mineral water was installed at this site in 1917. In the early 1920s William and Emily McDonald purchased the property from Roop. More guest cabins were added, bringing the total to 24. The guest cabin Arizona was erected in 1924, but unfortunately it was consumed by fire in 1992. A number of the original guest cabins from the 1920s are still extant, each named after a different state. The cabin names are clearly affixed to the front of each structure for easy identification.

Social activity at Gilroy Hot Springs was intense in this period. Bootleg liquor and slot machines drew large crowds for birthday parties, Thursday night poker games, swimming parties, Saturday night dances and local service club socials. Over 500 registrants per day would visit the resort in the peak summer season. The San Francisco Motorcycle Club had an especially notable outing here in 1920 (Gilroy Advocate, 1920).

Automobile use was rising dramatically in this era, so that a frenzy of tree cutting occurred in the early 1920s all along Gilroy Hot Springs Road to accommodate the burgeoning auto arrivals. Yet at the end of the decade, the Great Depression caused resort activity to dwindle. Accelerants to the decline were the death of William McDonald and foreclosure by Roop. By 1934, the Gilroy Hot Springs Post Office was closed, and in 1935, the Southern Pacific Railroad ended its auto stage service to the resort.

== Beginning of Japanese influence ==
On September 15, 1938, "Japanese Capitalist Buys Famed Gilroy Hot Springs Resort" read the headline in the Gilroy Advocate. Kyuzaburo Sakata, a successful local Japanese lettuce grower in Watsonville, announced he would build a Japanese garden to be designed by Nagao Sakurai, of the Imperial Palace, who was involved in the Japanese exhibit at the 1939 Golden Gate Exposition at Treasure Island in San Francisco. Gilroy Hot Springs was a microcosm of the successful struggle of Japanese Americans to attain full ownership in the American Dream. Unlike other cultures of immigrants who, encountering discrimination, withdrew into enclaves, Japanese settlers fought within the system to obtain a stake. Gilroy Hot Springs became a powerful symbol to Americans of Japanese ancestry, especially because the hot springs recalled similar physiographic features of their native land (Seido, 1941).

== World War II and aftermath ==
After the bombing of Pearl Harbor, Sakata and the considerable Japanese American population of Santa Clara County were imprisoned in Internment Camps. Caucasian business partners of Sakata carried on the resort operations during the war at a lessened state of grandeur. After release from the Internment Camp, Sakata returned to be an owner and manager of the resort. He invited his fellow Japanese Americans to join him "in the blessing nature created in Hot Springs in our search for the power of healing". It served as a gathering place where Americans of Japanese ancestry intermingled and relaxed with their European American counterparts.

== Modern era ==
The sleeping annex was demolished in 1946, and in 1964 Sakata could not afford to meet the requirements of county building inspectors regarding new code for cabin heating systems. Thus, he sold the property to Philip S. Grimes, a landscape architect from Portola Valley. The hotel and clubhouse burned down in 1980. The property was operated as a private resort until 1988, when it was purchased by Fukuyama International, Inc., headquartered in Osaka, Japan. Fukuyama then launched plans for rehabilitation of the property as a Japanese American cultural and recreation center and secured its standing as a California Historical Landmark.

In 2003, the property was purchased by the California Department of Parks and Recreation and added to the Henry W. Coe State Park. Although it is currently closed to the public until a management plan is implemented, many of the structures have fallen victim to vandalism and the ravages of time and weather.

== Bibliography ==
- Gilroy as a Home, Coffin 1873:31 National Register of Historic Places OMB 1024–0018
- Gilroy Advocate, 17 May 1924
- Gilroy Hot Springs Rehabilitation Project, Santa Clara County, Fukuyama International, Inc., 209 Post Street, San Francisco, California, June 1, 1995
- James E. Ball et al., Geologic Evaluation of Gilroy Hot Springs, Earth Systems Consultants, File No. NJG-2034-05 47853 Warm Springs Boulevard, Fremont, California, May, 1995
- List of California Historical Landmarks, Santa Clara County, State of California Landmark 1017
- Environmental assessment prepared by Lumina Technologies for Santa Clara County (1999)
- National Register of Historic Places, U.S. Dept. of Interior, National Park Service, Office of Management and Budget No. 1024–0018
- Masuro Seido Collection (1941) National Register of Historic Places OMB 1024–0018
- Gilroy Hot Springs Joins Henry Coe State Park, "?". The Nature Conservancy. 2003. Archived from the original on May 12, 2008.
- Ian L. Sanders: The Mineral Springs of Santa Clara County, Design Factory Graphics, 2012. ISBN 9780615613260
- Ian L. Sanders and Michael F. Brookman: A Hundred Years of Gilroy Hot Springs, 1860s–1960s, Design Factory Graphics, 2014. ISBN 978-0989524612
