= Manito Park =

Historic park and gardens in Spokane, Washington, United States

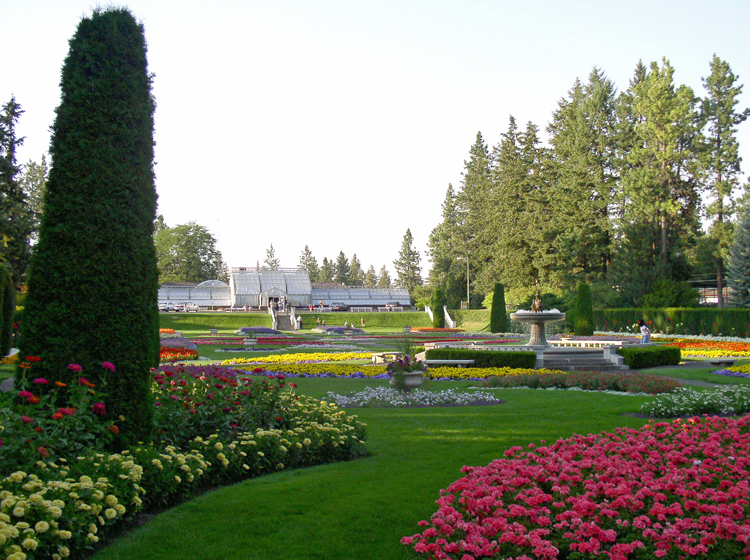
- Manito Park's Duncan Garden
- Interactive map of Manito Park
- Type: Urban park
- Location: Spokane, Washington
- Coordinates: 47.6357°N 117.4117°W
- Area: 90 acres (36 ha)
- Created: April 1904
- Operator: Spokane Parks and Recreation Department
- Status: Open year round (daily 6 a.m. to 10 pm)
- Public transit: Spokane Transit Authority routes 4 and 144
- Website: my.spokanecity.org/parks/major/manito/

- Manito Park and Boulevard
- U.S. National Register of Historic Places
- U.S. Historic district
- Built: 1904–1974
- Architect: Harold T. Abbott, Chester A. Houghtaling, Olmsted Brothers, Nagao Sakurai, et al.
- NRHP reference No.: 15000909
- Added to NRHP: December 15, 2015

Manito Park, also called Manito Park and Botanical Gardens is a 90-acre (0.36 km^{2}) public park with arboretum, botanical gardens, and conservatory, located at 17th Ave and Grand Blvd in the Manito/Cannon Hill neighborhood of Spokane, Washington, United States. It is open daily without charge.

Manito Park is considered to be the city's primary community park, a distinction it has held for over a century. The historic nature of the park and its gardens was recognized in 2015 when it was listed on the National Register of Historic Places.

Across the park's 90 acres are six gardens dedicated to specific plants or styles, a greenhouse, two playgrounds, shaded lawns, natural areas, a baseball field, splash pad and a small food and drink stand. The park hosts numerous community events throughout the year including plant sales, art shows, concerts and a holiday light display.

== Setting ==
Located in the Manito/Cannon Hill neighborhood on Spokane's South Hill, approximately one-and-one-half miles south of Downtown Spokane. The park is located in a residential area between 17th Avenue in the north and 25th Avenue, and Grand Boulevard on the east and Bernard Street. Terrain in the area gradually climbs about 100 feet from north to south, with elevations of 2,300 feet in the north. This has led to areas of the park commonly referred to as "upper" or "lower" Manito. While the park does gradually gain elevation heading north to south, it is not uniform as the area is very hilly throughout.

The park is home to many tall, old, native ponderosa pine and other conifer trees, as well as introduced deciduous trees like those that line the adjacent Manito Boulevard. There is much exposed basalt, including some small cliffs, in the park and many of the buildings including the park office are constructed out of the rock.

Two tree-lined boulevards extend out from the park. Manito Boulevard stretches south to High Drive along the southern bluff of the South Hill and 21st Avenue heads west to the High Drive bluff. Both contain manicured grass, tree-lined parkway islands along their entire track out from Manito Park. Grand Boulevard, a major north–south arterial in the city, passes along the eastern boundary of the park and provides access to the park's main entrance.

== History ==
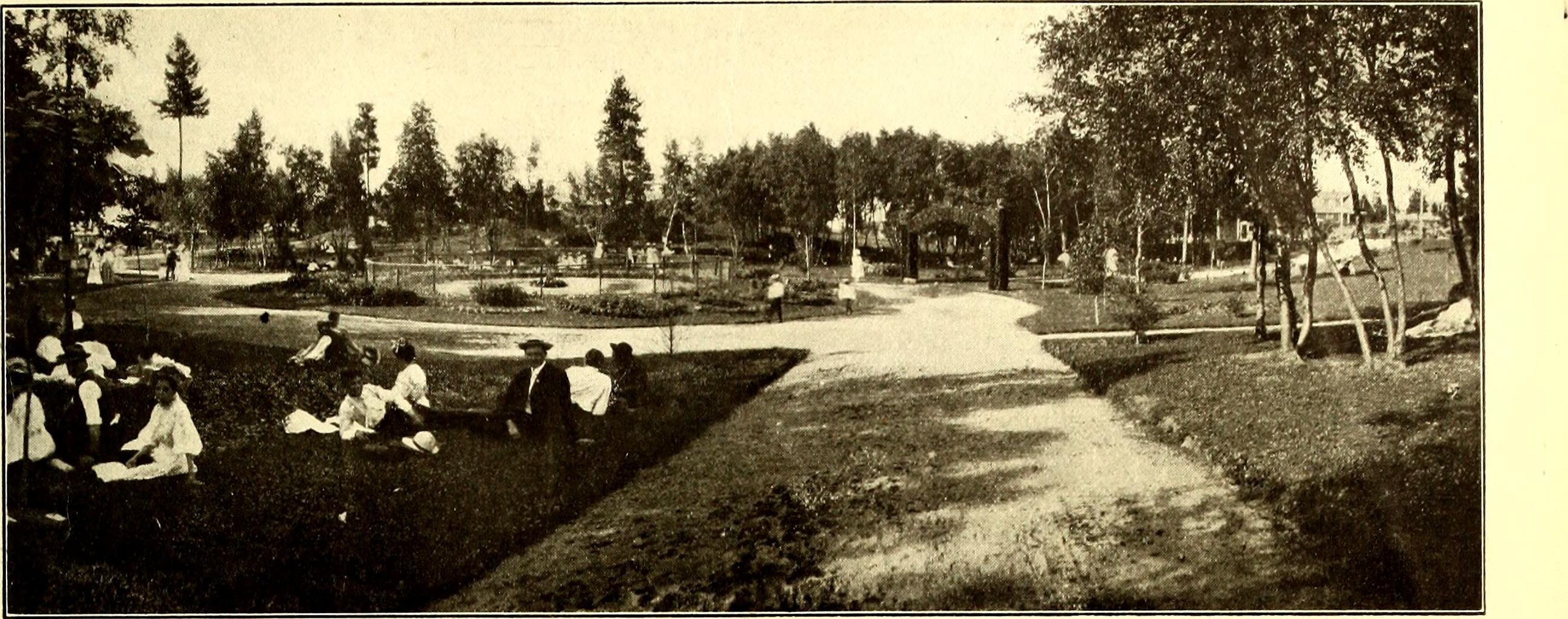
Historic image of the early days of the park.

What is now Manito Park, like the rest of the city of Spokane and surrounding area, was inhabited by the Spokane people for centuries prior to contact with European settlers. Once white settlers arrived in the area in the second half of the 19th century the Spokane area began to grow in population and expanded up the hill that rises to the south of the original settlement at Spokane Falls. Newspaperman and entrepreneur Francis Cook purchased 160 acres of land on the South Hill and named the area Montrose after the wild roses which grew there. Cook financed the Spokane and Montrose Motor Railroad, a streetcar connection to downtown meant to entice homebuyers to the area. In 1886, Cook hosted a fair at Mirror Lake, now Mirror Pond, in what would become Manito Park, but his fortunes changed due to the Panic of 1893. In the ensuing economic decline, Cook lost his investment at Montrose.

In 1903 its name was changed to Manito, from the Algonquian word manitou. This change came after mining and railroad magnate Jay P. Graves took over Cook's holdings. After changing the name of the area, Graves donated the land to the city to become a park in exchange for the city extending water lines to developments in the surrounding area. A park commission was formed in 1907 with annual funding, and in 1913 the famed Olmsted Brothers firm completed their landscaping plans for Spokane parks, including Manito Park. Starting in 1905 the park was home to a zoo, which the Olmsted Brothers recommended removing, but the city kept the zoo in operation despite the suggestion. It lasted until 1932 when the zoo closed down because of the lack of funding during the Great Depression. Today some remnants of the zoo can still be seen, such as an iron bar sticking out of a rock that was once part of the bear cages.

== The gardens ==
Manito Park is home to six gardens each dedicated to a specific style or variety of plants and one greenhouse featuring plants that are not compatible with Spokane's climate.

=== Duncan Garden ===
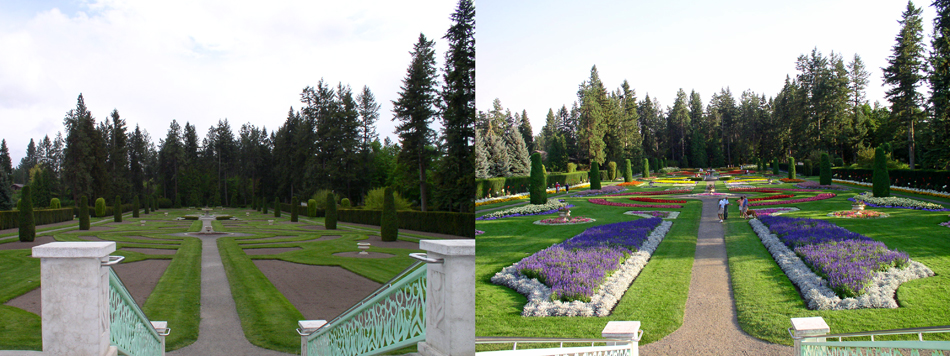
The Duncan Garden in 2003, before and after flowers were planted.

A formal 3-acre (1.2 ha) European Renaissance-style garden with a large granite fountain at the center and a gazebo at the south end. It is located immediately to the south of the Gaiser Conservatory, which overlooks it from atop a small hill. The arrangement of the flower beds and plants make the Duncan Garden bilaterally symmetrical. There are 63 beds in the garden which are filled with over 30 thousand individual plants. Planting typically begins in May and the gardens are maintained until the arrival of regular frost in October or November.

Named for John Duncan, Spokane's second park superintendent from 1910 to 1942, the garden was originally known as the Sunken Garden for its location in a previously muddy depression. Duncan designed and built the garden in 1912, and it was renamed in his honor in 1942. The granite fountain at the center was donated by Verus Davenport, widow of early Spokane businessman Louis B. Davenport, in 1956.

=== Joel E. Ferris Perennial Garden ===
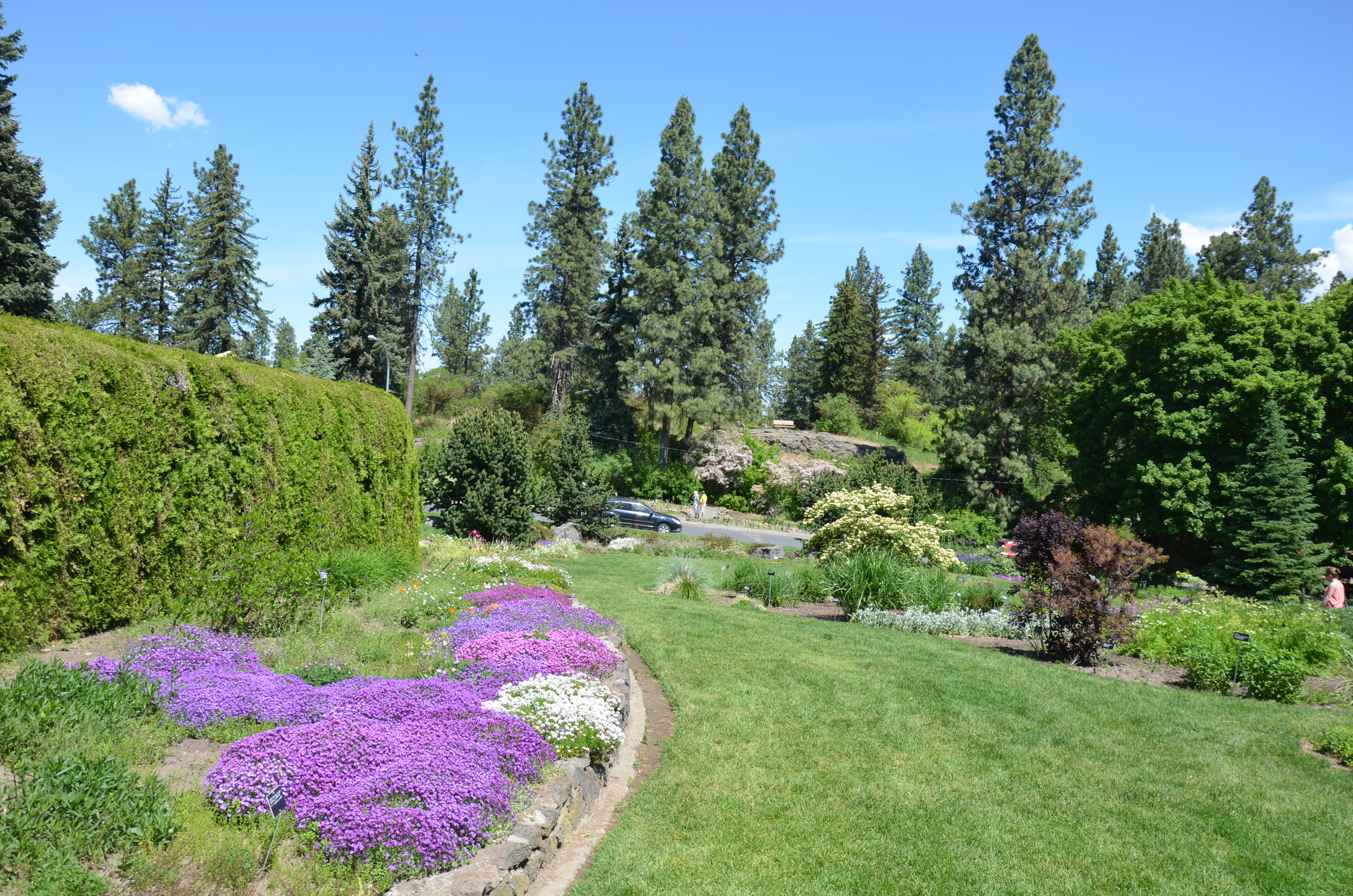
Joel E. Ferris Perennial Garden

Located on the opposite side of the Gaiser Conservatory from the formal Duncan Garden, the Ferris Perennial Garden provides a more organic and natural-looking counterpoint to the rigid geometric garden to its south. The garden features a broad mix of more than 300 plants from herbs and flowers to small trees. Also unlike the formal Duncan Garden, plant species in this garden are accompanied by a small nameplate for curious visitors. It is set on a gently sloping hill which climbs up to the park's office building and located centrally in the middle of the park. A small parking area is adjacent to the garden, on Park Drive between the perennial garden and the Rose Hill to the west.

The area was originally home to hedge-lined paths connecting various areas of the zoo, which occupied the park until 1932. After the zoo closed the area sat vacant until 1940, when John Duncan designed a garden for perennial plants. A major expansion took place in 1996 which quadrupled the space available for planting. The garden is named for Joel E. Ferris, a longtime park board member. After his death in 1960, the garden was named in his honor.

=== Gaiser Conservatory ===
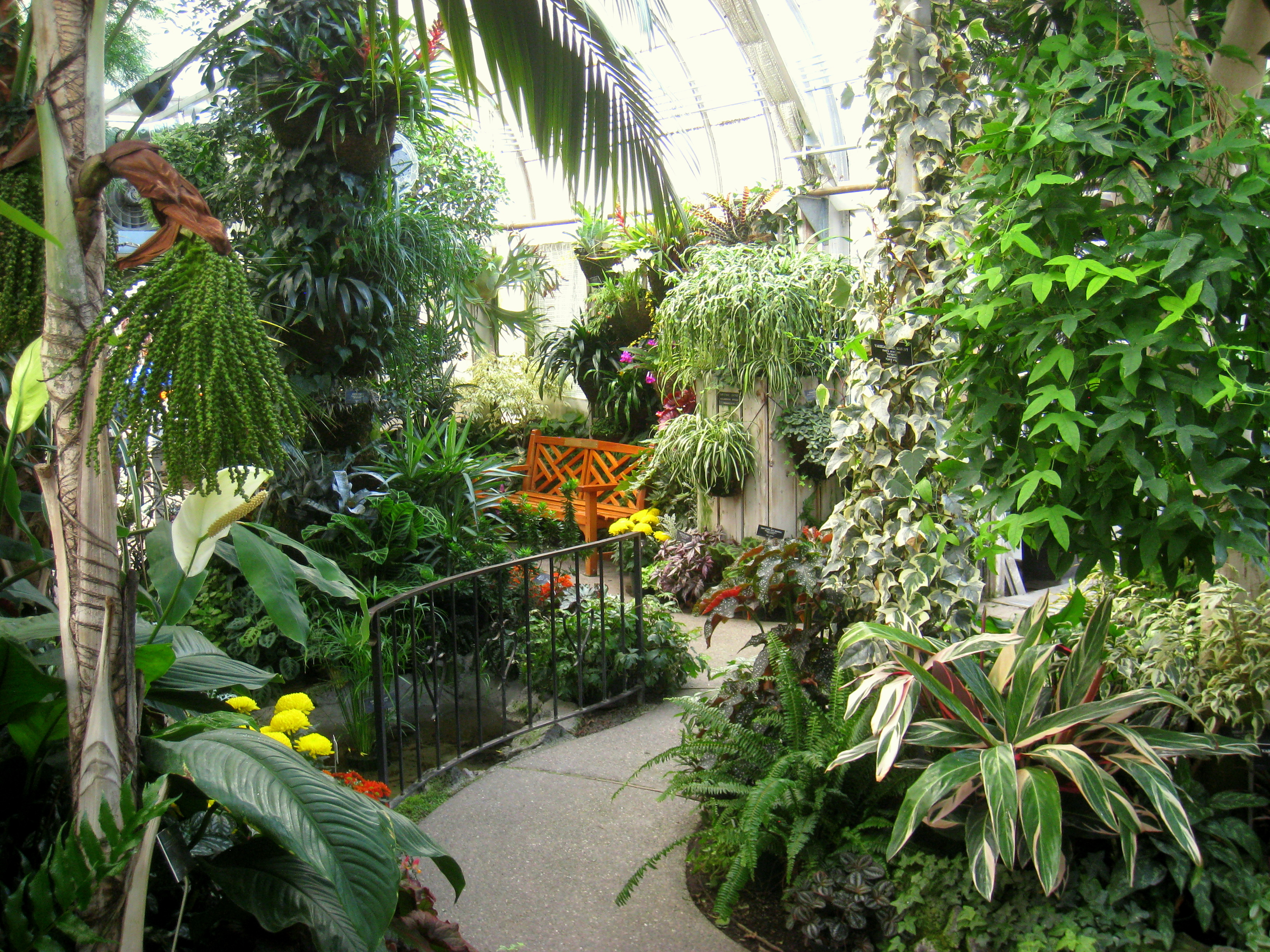
Gaiser Conservatory

Named for Dr. David Gaiser, who served on the city's park board for many years, the Gaiser Conservatory is located immediately to the north of the Duncan Garden. Parking in front of the conservatory is accessible from the entrance at 21st Avenue and Park Drive. The conservatory is open daily, except for Wednesdays, from 9 a.m. to 3:30 p.m. and is free of charge.

Manito Park's original greenhouse was located in the northern area of the park until 1912, when one was constructed at the current location. Prior to 1974, when Spokane was preparing to host the world's fair, the greenhouse was not open to the public and served a utilitarian role to grow plants for the park over Spokane's cold winters. A 1974 renovation opened the southernmost portion of the greenhouse complex to the public. To pay for this, the city raised $100,000 with $50,000 coming from an anonymous donation, though it is speculated the anonymous donor was Dr. Gaiser. An additional $30,000 donation was made by the Comstock Foundation after costs ran over expectation. A central dome area was added in 1988. The to southernmost wings and central dome are now open to the public and feature a variety of tropical and desert plants not suited to Spokane's climate, while the three northern wings still serve to grow plants and flowers for other areas of the park.

=== Nishinomiya Tsutakawa Japanese Garden ===
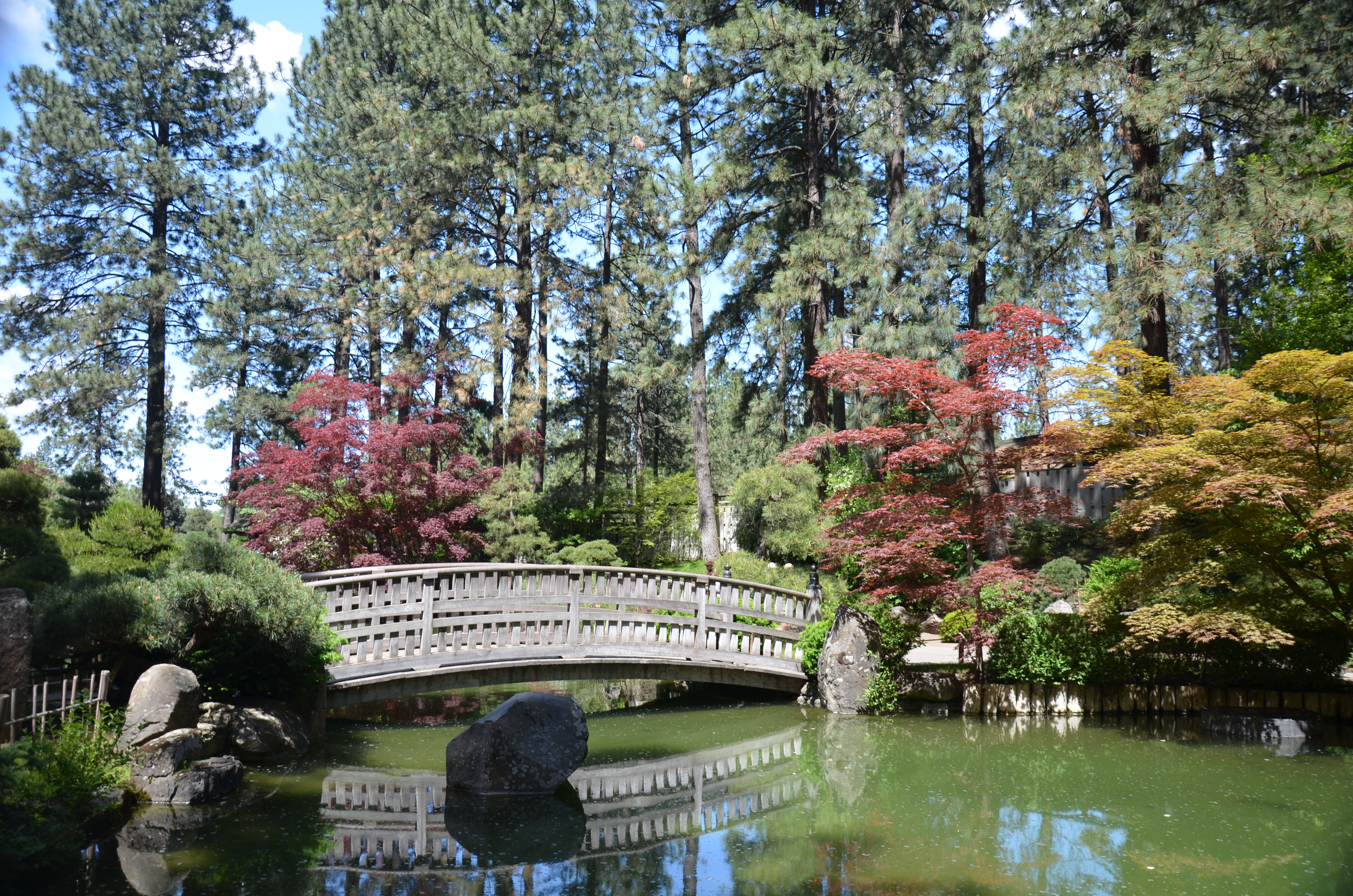
Nishinomiya Tsutakawa Japanese Garden

Named in honor of Nishinomiya, Japan, one of Spokane's sister cities, and Ed Tsutakawa, who was responsible for the sister city relationship. The garden is open daily, free of charge, from April to October from 10 a.m. to 6 pm. In 1967 noted landscape architect Nagao Sakurai began its design. After his stroke in 1973, designs were completed by Shosuke Nagai and Hirohiko Kawai and the garden was dedicated in 1974. The garden's waterfall was dedicated before the garden opened, in 1970, and the koi pond was filled by two Japanese girl scouts who mixed water from Spokane and Nishinomiya. The garden features a large koi pond fed by an artificial waterfall and traversed by a bridge surrounded by numerous varieties of Japanese trees and sculptures. It is located on the western edge of the park at the corner of Bernard Street and 21st Avenue, with an entrance to parking off 21st.

=== Rose Hill ===
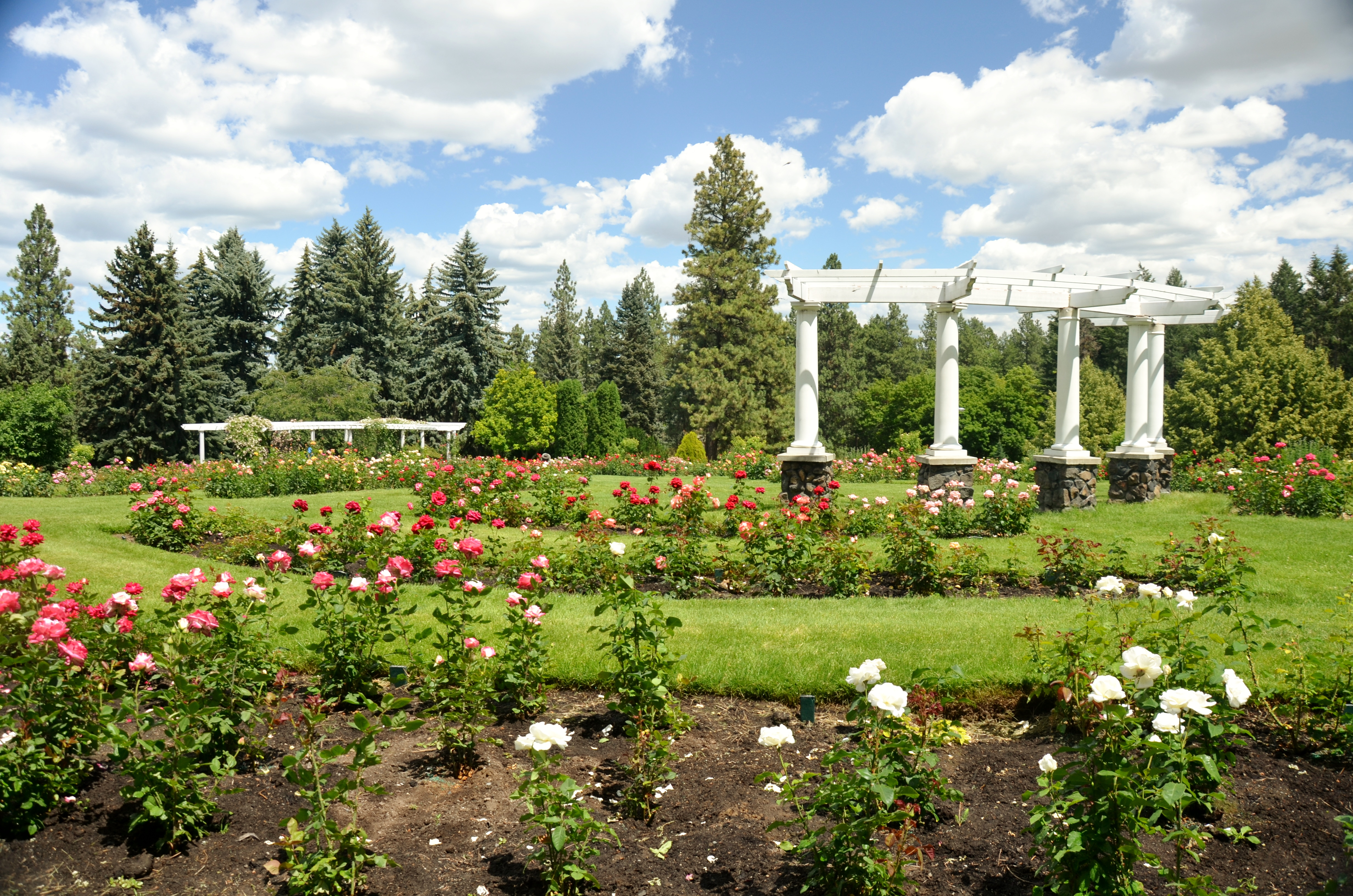
Rose Hill

Located on a small hill just above and to the west of the Joel E. Ferris Perennial Garden, Rose Hill is home to over 1,500 rose bushes representing more than 150 varieties. Flanked by colonnades on the north and south ends of the garden, Rose Hill is a popular venue for photography and weddings. It is one of 125 All-America Selections rose test gardens in the country. Parking is available immediately to the east, south and west of Rose Hill.

Manito Park was known in its earliest years as Montrose Park, for the abundance of wild roses that grew in the area. Prior to development of Rose Hill, the site was home to a spring-fed pond and the elk and moose exhibit at the Manito Park zoo before it was closed in 1932. Development of the garden began in 1950 and in 1951 American Rose Society included Rose Hill on its list of 90 test gardens in the United States. All-American Rose Selections named Rose Hill as the top rose garden in the nation in 2007.

=== Lilac Garden ===
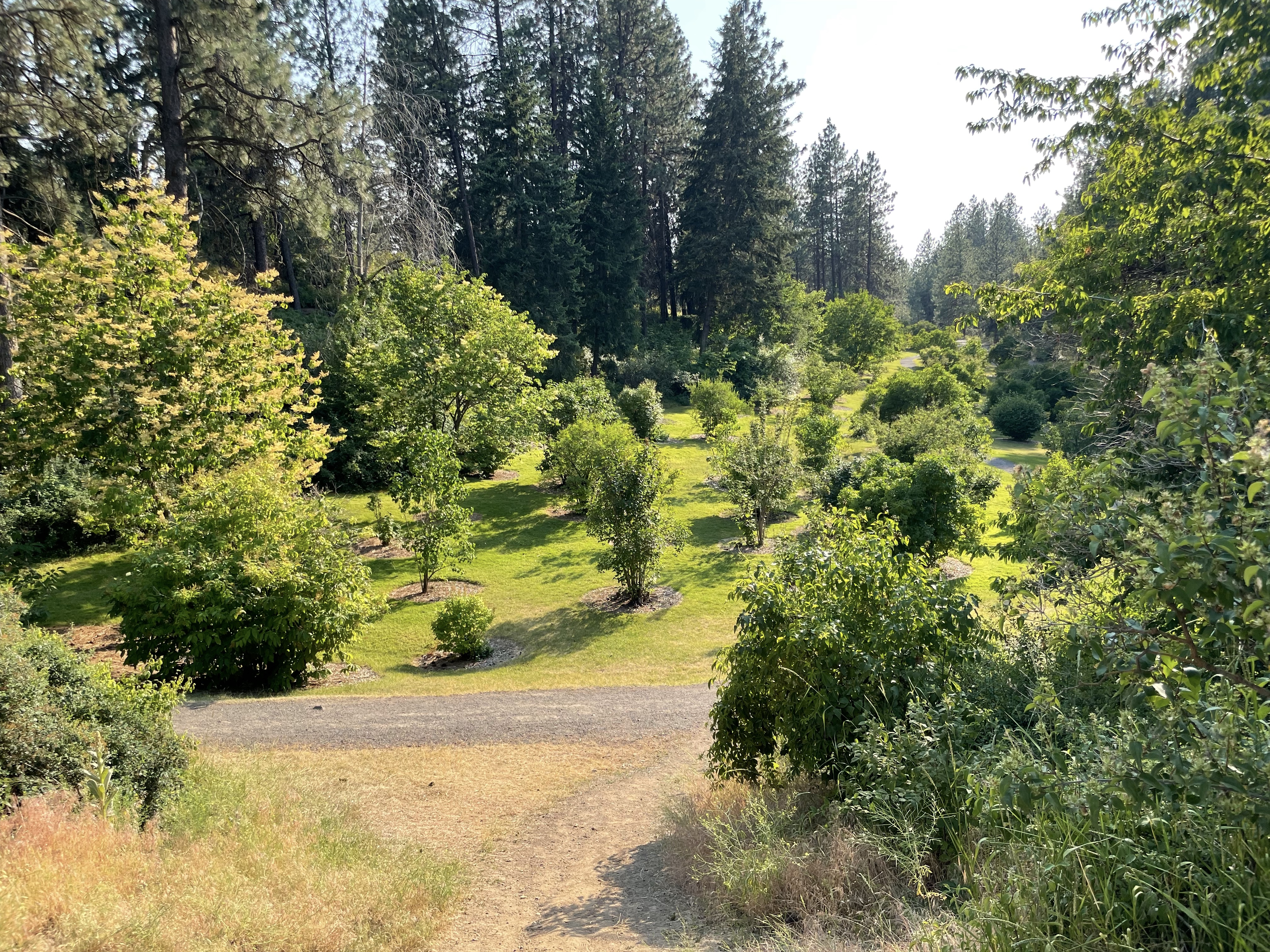
Lilac Garden

Spokane's nickname of the "Lilac City" is reflected in Manito Park's Lilac Garden. The plant is not native to the area, but the city encouraged planting of them in the early years of the 1900s. John Duncan brought 128 cultivars to Manito Park in 1912. The garden was designed by Duncan in 1941, three years after Spokane celebrated its first annual Lilac Festival. Prior to becoming the Lilac Garden, the area was the buffalo enclosure at the zoo until its closure in 1932.

The Lilac Garden contains more than 100 named cultivars of representing 23 species of lilac, with one of those cultivars, Syringa vulgaris 'Spokane' being named for the city. It is located in the northwestern portion of the park, below and to the north of Rose Hill and otherwise surrounded by areas largely left to nature. Older park maps show vehicle access to the Lilac Garden along Loop Drive and Shoshone Avenue, but in 2023 the city decided to close those to vehicle traffic to promote a better pedestrian experience. The garden is open daily, free of charge, during normal park hours. Peak lilac bloom occurs during the months of May and June.

=== Dahlia Garden ===
A small patch of dahlias on the western edge of Rose Hill, it is one of the American Dahlia Society's eight trial gardens as of 2024.

== Mirror Pond ==
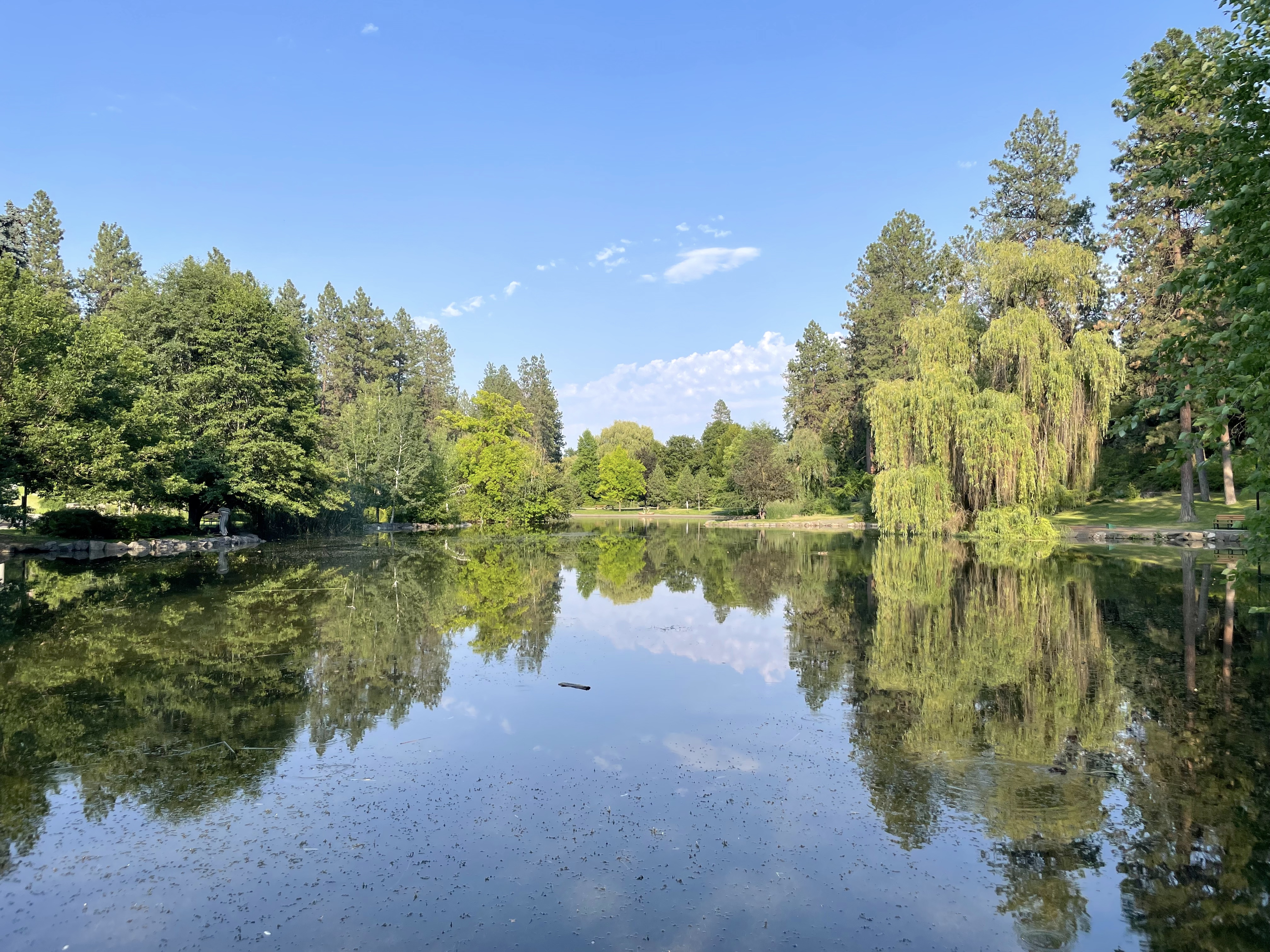
Mirror Pond

Located in the northwest corner of Manito Park is Mirror Pond. Originally three times larger than its current size, the pond stretched from its current location east to Grand Boulevard across what is now home to lawn, picnic areas and a playground. In the park's early days the pond was sometimes referred to as a lake and was advertised for its recreational opportunities and deemed to be safe as it was only two and a half feet deep. Ice skaters frequented it in the winter and a canoe rental operated during warmer months.

The eastern extension of Mirror Pond regularly dried up during warmer months, and water from the rest of the pond caused flooding problems for nearby homeowners. As a result, in 1912 the city secured the northern and western limits of the pond and over the years gradually filled in the eastern section. That process was completed in 1974, as part of city beautification efforts ahead of hosting Expo '74, with the construction of a concrete wall along what is now the eastern end of Mirror Pond. Further renovations occurred after a devastating ice storm in 1996 damaged many trees surrounding the pond. In 2020, the pond was rehabilitated to reduce algae blooms and improve water quality. Upgrades were also made to the path surrounding the pond at that time.

== Amenities and activities ==
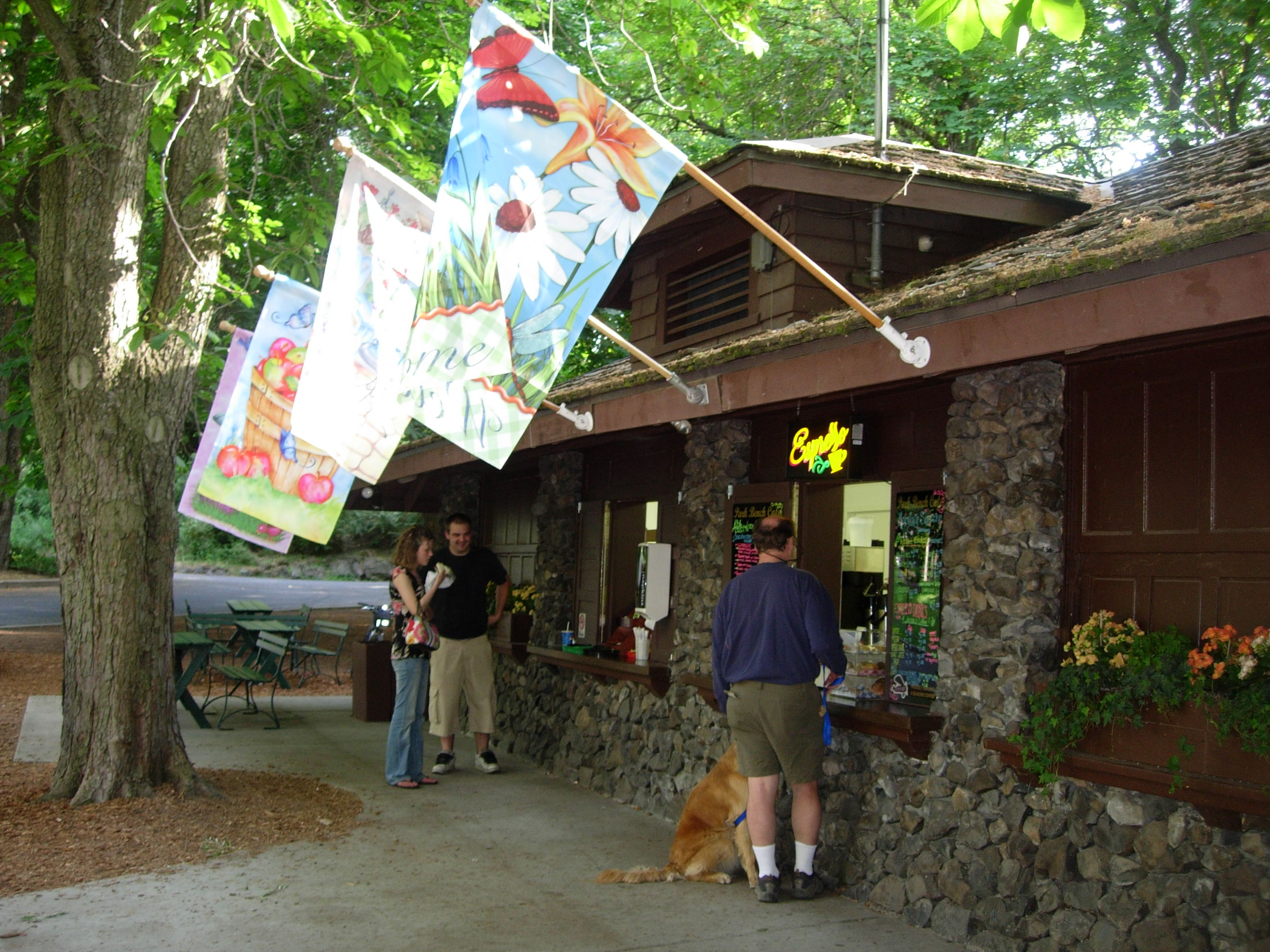
Manito Park Bench Cafe June, 2007.

In addition to the gardens, Manito Park features broad grass lawns, some under a canopy of shade trees and others open to the sun, and areas that have been largely left to nature. There are two playground areas, one in the south and one in the north, a baseball diamond, tennis courts, a picnic shelter with fire pits and uncovered picnic areas. During the summer months, the Park Bench Cafe is open daily selling food and beverages. There are four public restrooms around the park, with the centrally located restrooms in the park office building open year-round. There are two memorials in the park, one across from the Park Bench Cafe honoring George Washington and the other next to Mirror Pond honoring Lawrence Rist, a Spokanite and soldier killed in action during the Korean War. The latter is also a functional wood-burning hearth.

Numerous annual events take place in the park. The Friends of Manito host plant sales every spring with proceeds benefiting the park. The Friends of Manito also put on an art festival in the park on a June Saturday and in the weeks leading up to Christmas create a walk-through light display. On Friday evenings during the summer months, free concerts are held at the Park Bench Cafe.

During winter months the park is a popular destination for sledding on the many hills in the southern portion of the park, as well as hockey and ice skating when Mirror Pond freezes over.

== Historic district ==
Manito Park makes up the bulk of a historic district that has been listed on the National Register of Historic Places (NRHP) since 2015 named Manito Park and Boulevard. The district includes the park and the parkway running down Manito Boulevard from near the center of the park at 21st Avenue south to approximately 35th Avenue at Hart Field. The boulevard was designed in 1904 and plans were finalized in 1912 after extension of the boulevard was included in the 1907 Olmsted Brothers plan for the city.

The historic district is composed of 39 "contributing resources" of which 13 are structures, 10 are buildings, eight are sites and four are objects. The contributing buildings, which include restrooms, maintenance buildings and garages, and administrative offices, are distinctive in their use of basalt rubble construction, typical of buildings in early Spokane parks. Two large basalt outcroppings, Flag Hill to the north of Mirror Pond and Goat Hill to the south, are included as contributing sites and were mentioned for their vistas in the Olmsted plan. Each of the gardens are included as contributing sites as well.

== Gallery ==
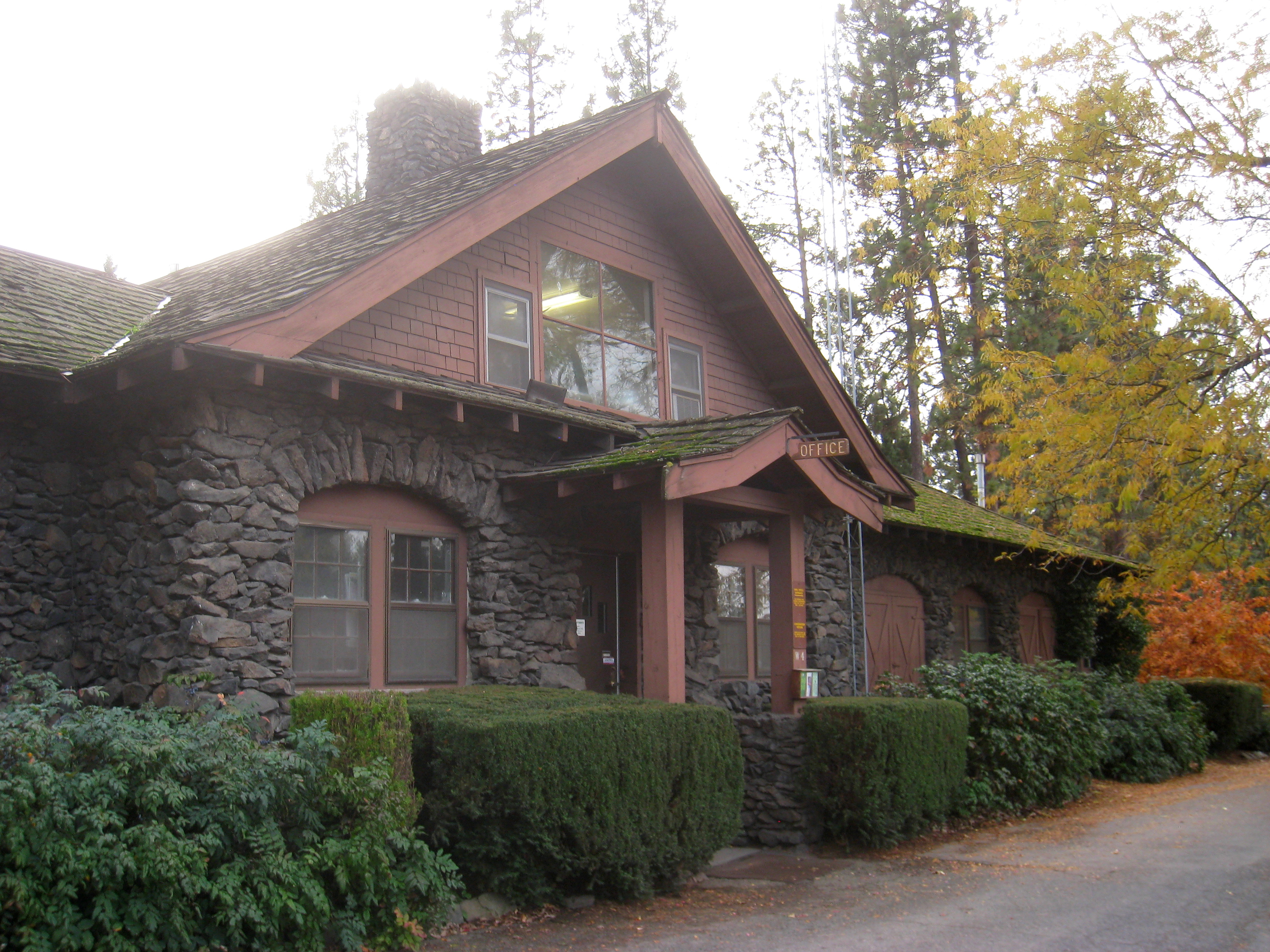
Park office building

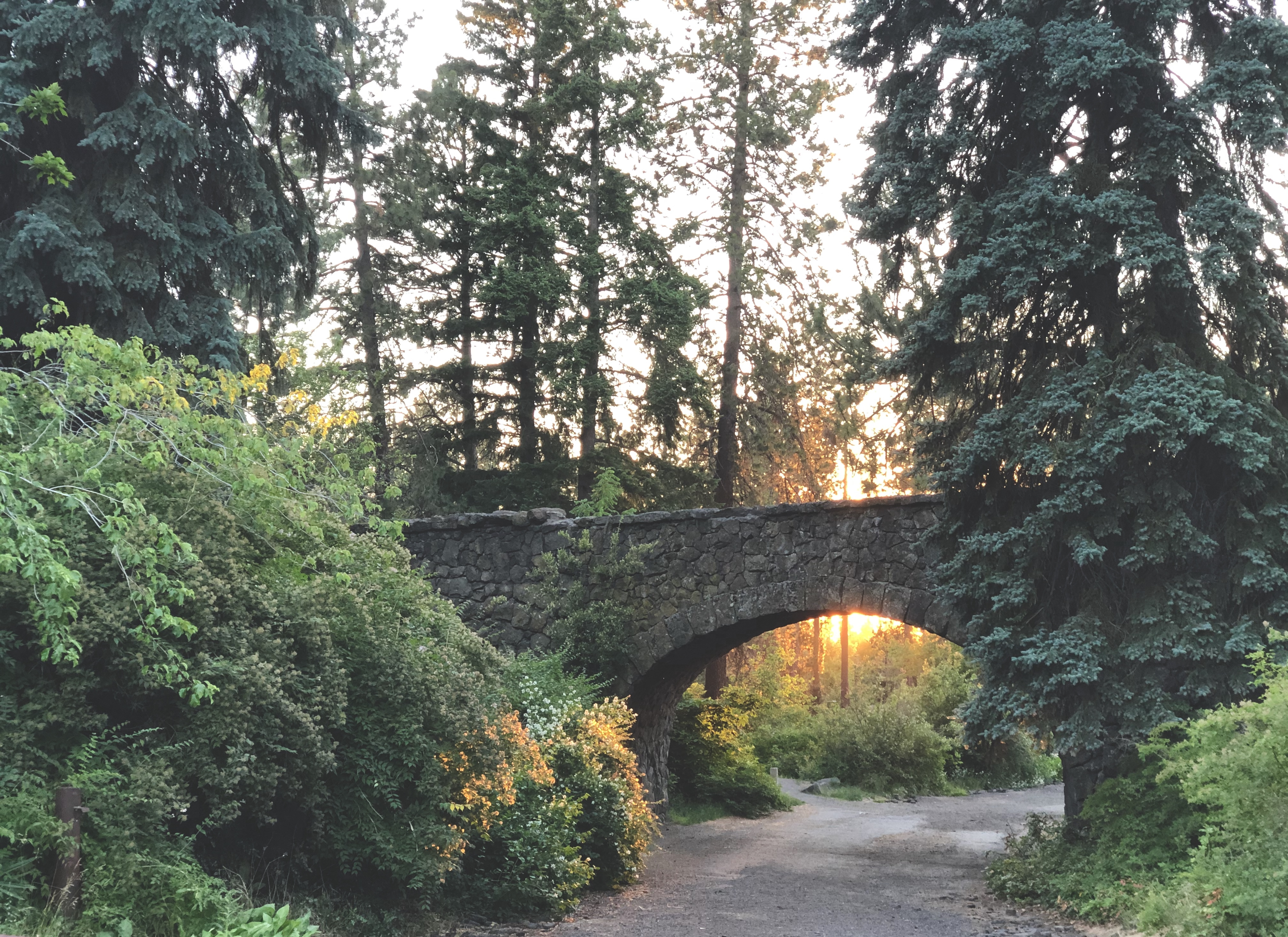
Bridge on Loop Drive

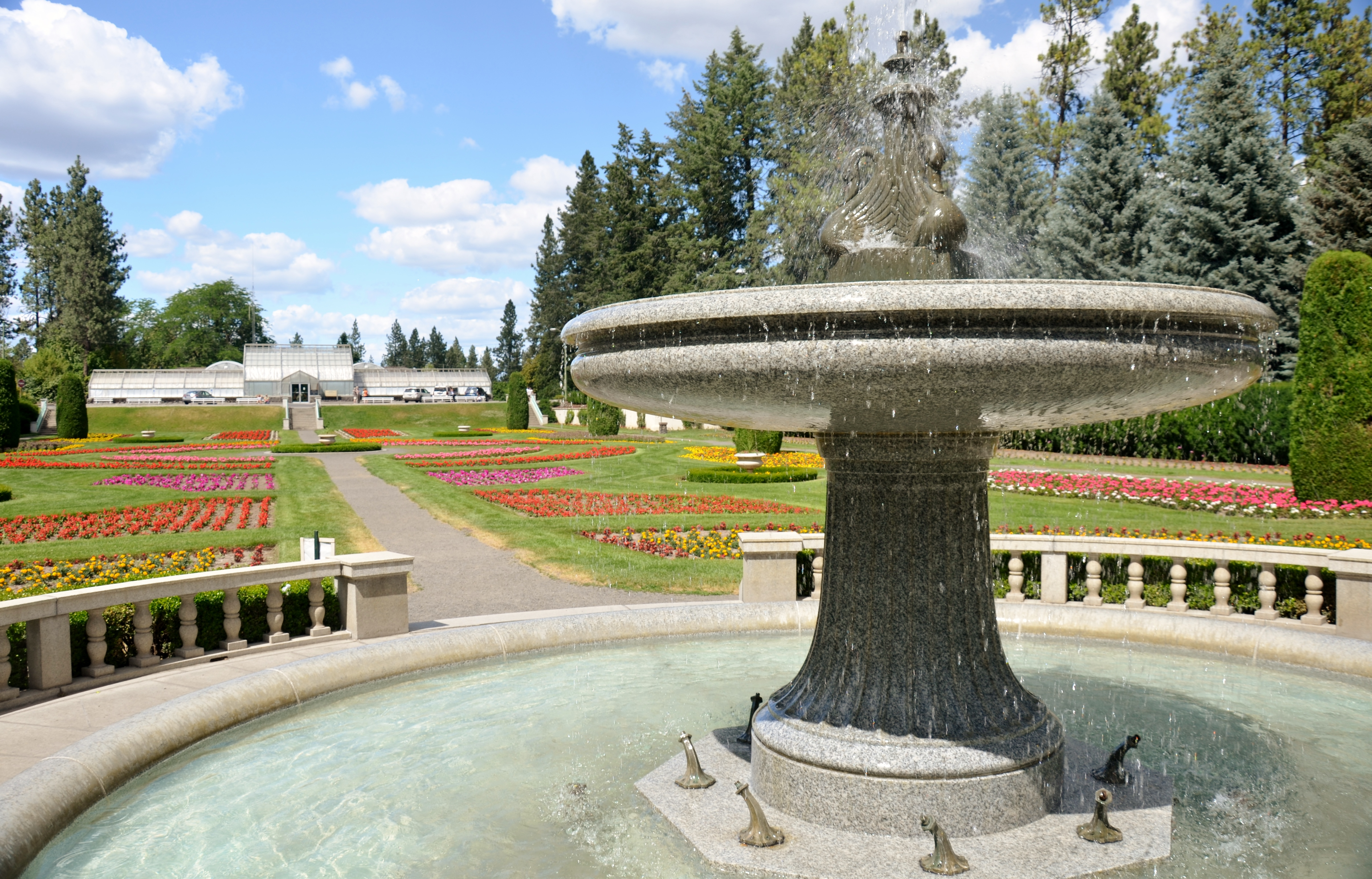
Duncan Garden central fountain with Gaiser Conservatory

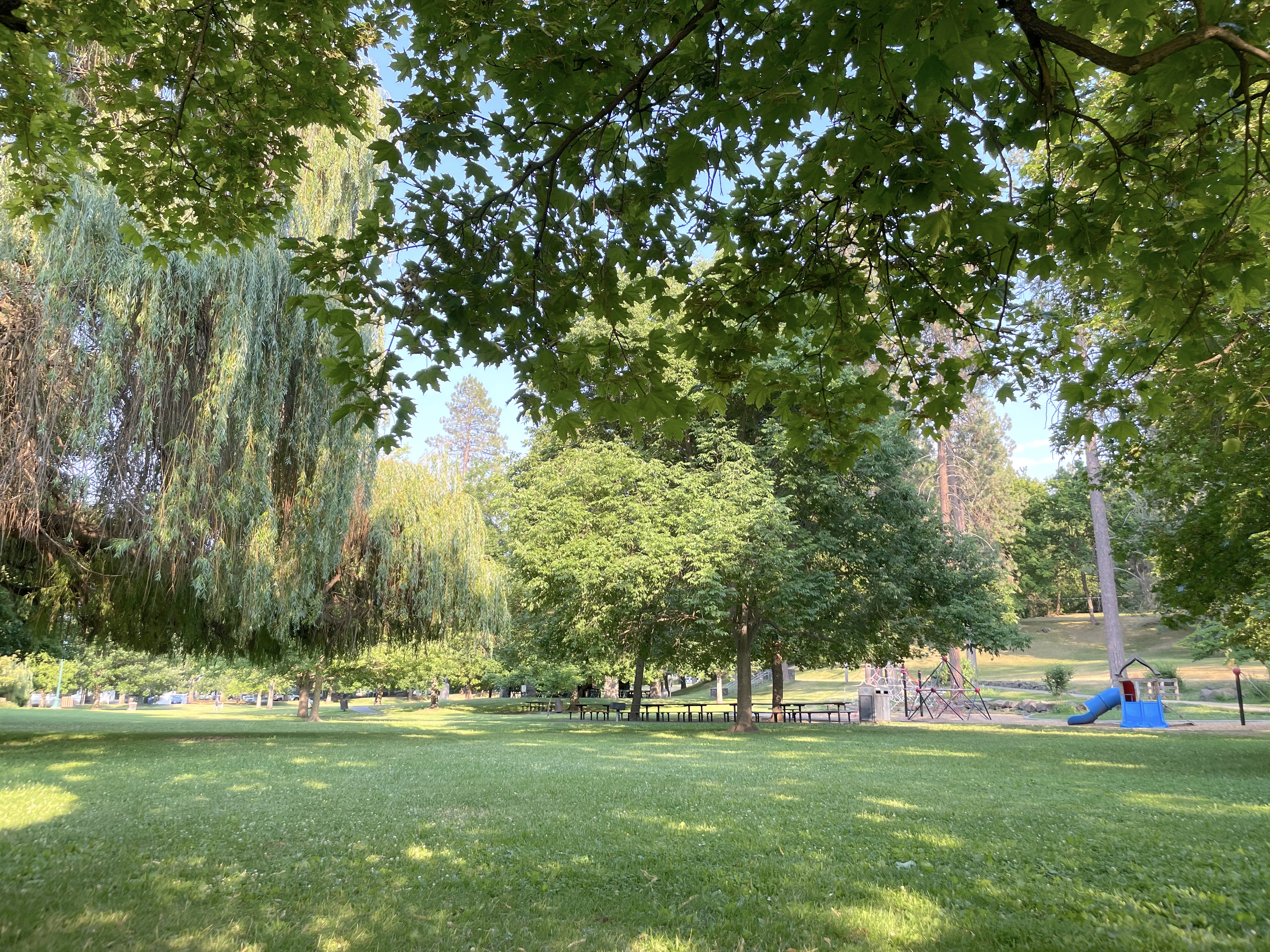
Lawn and playground in lower Manito Park

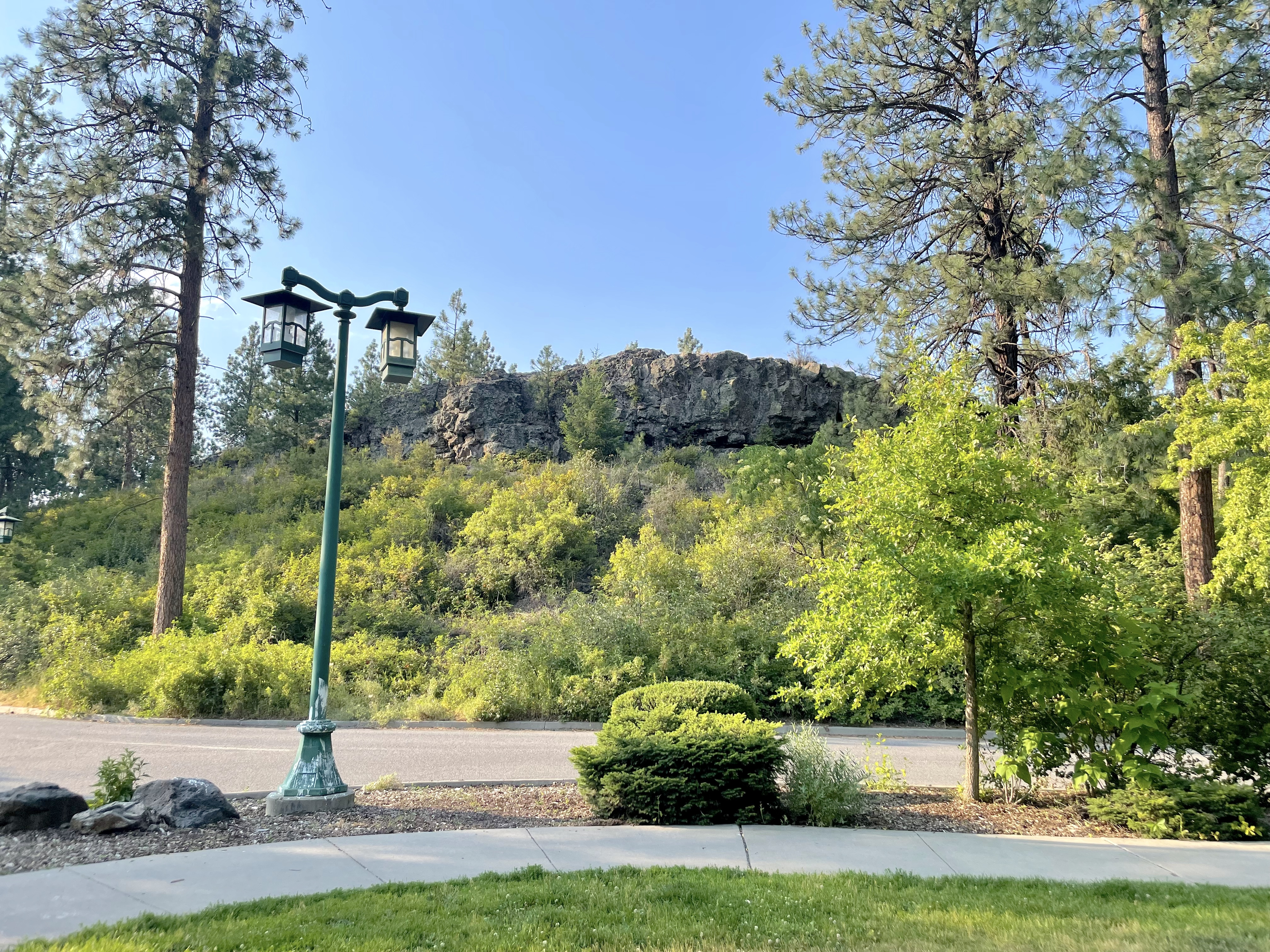
Flag Hill in lower Manito Park

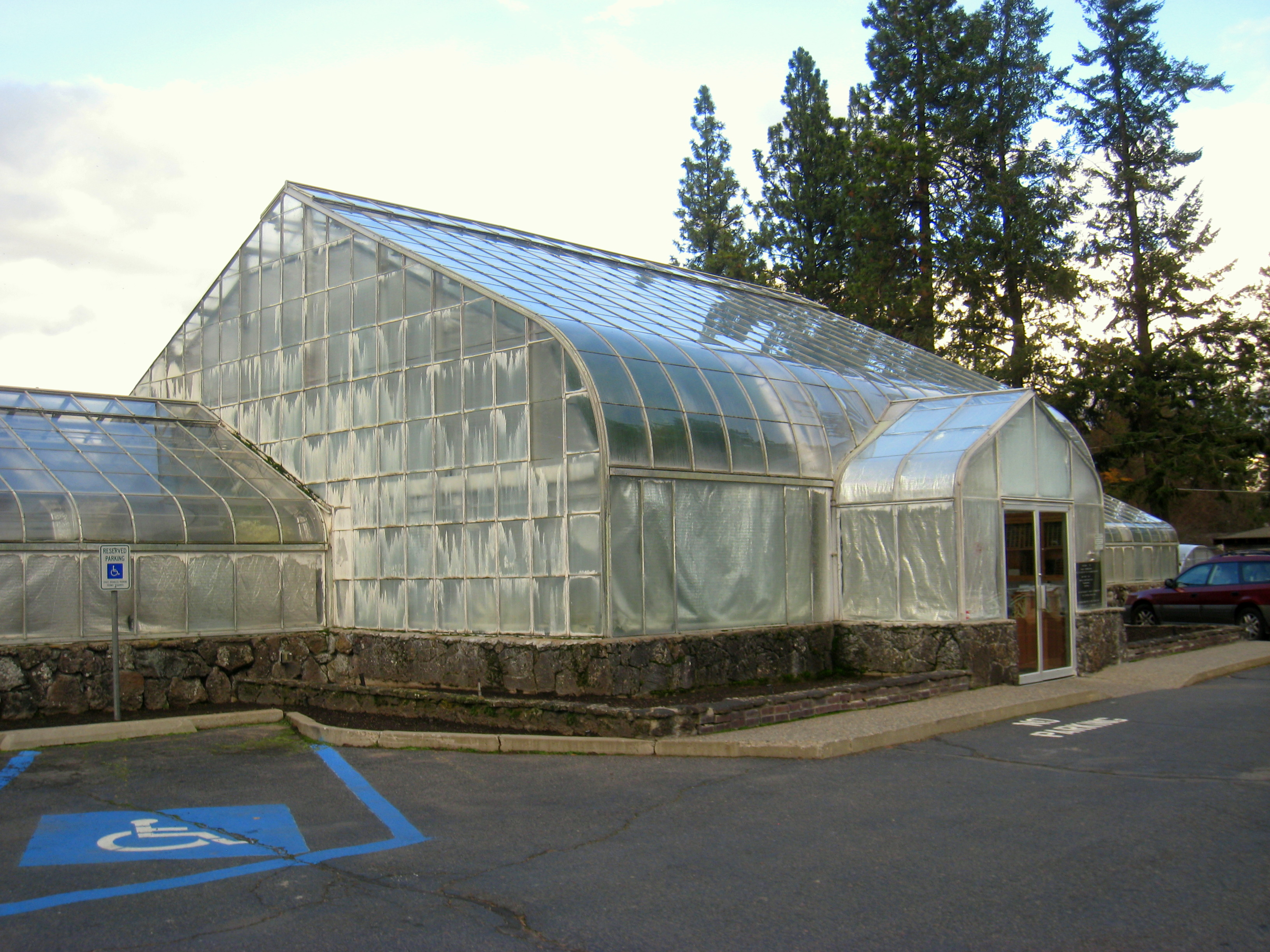
Conservatory entrance.

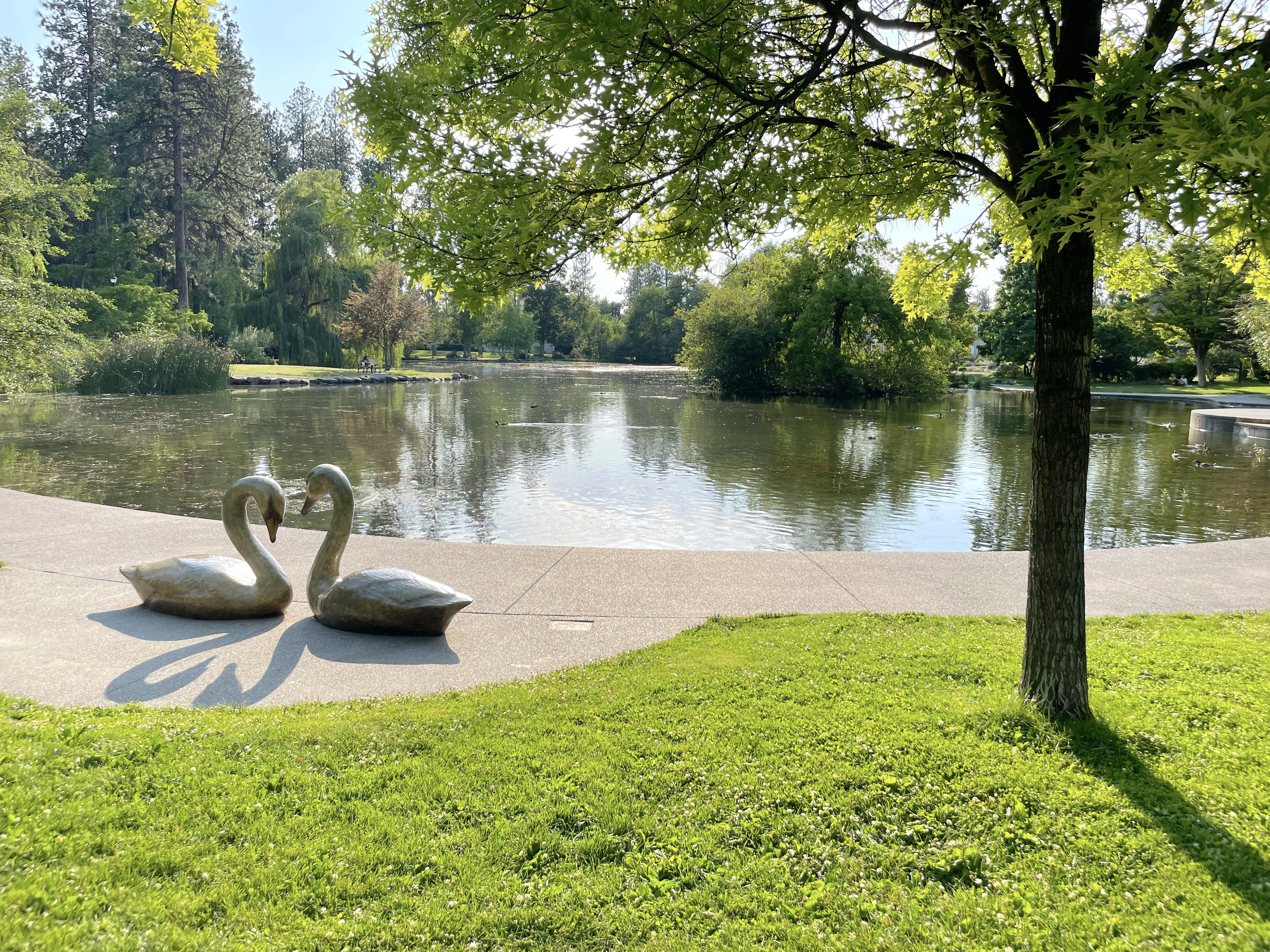
Swan sculptures near pond.

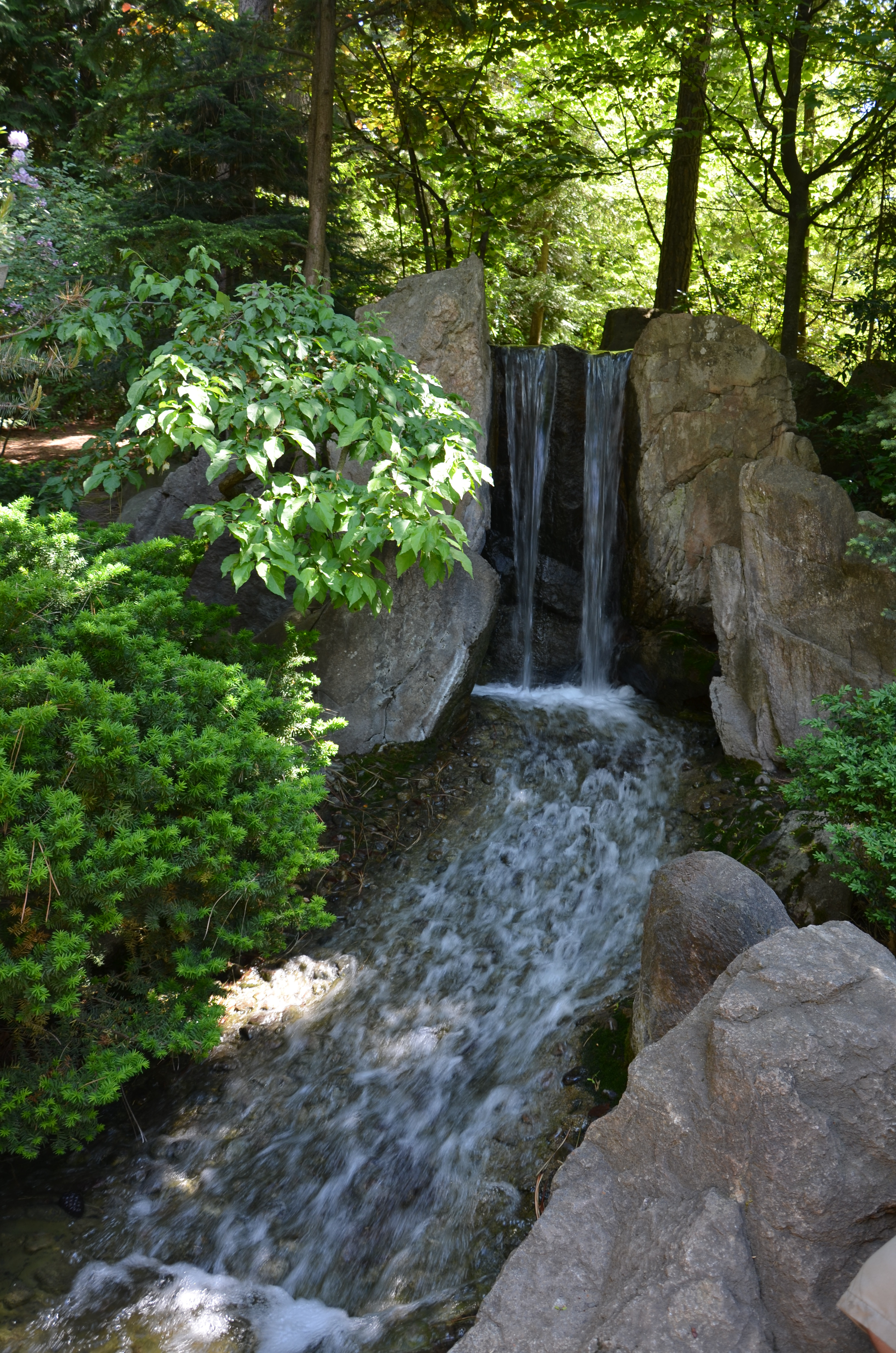
Waterfall along a trail.

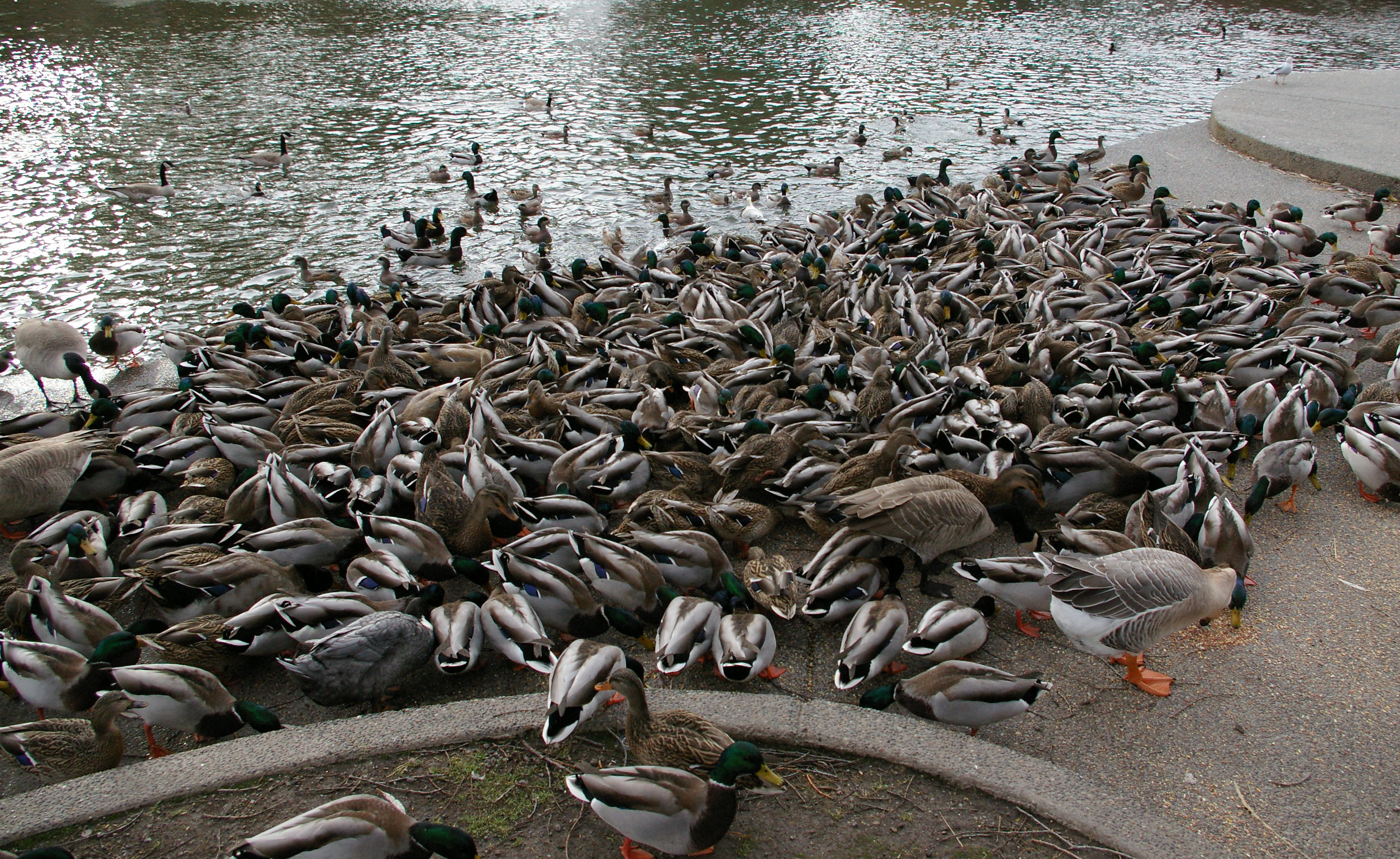
Mallard ducks and Canada geese congregating near the Mirror Pond

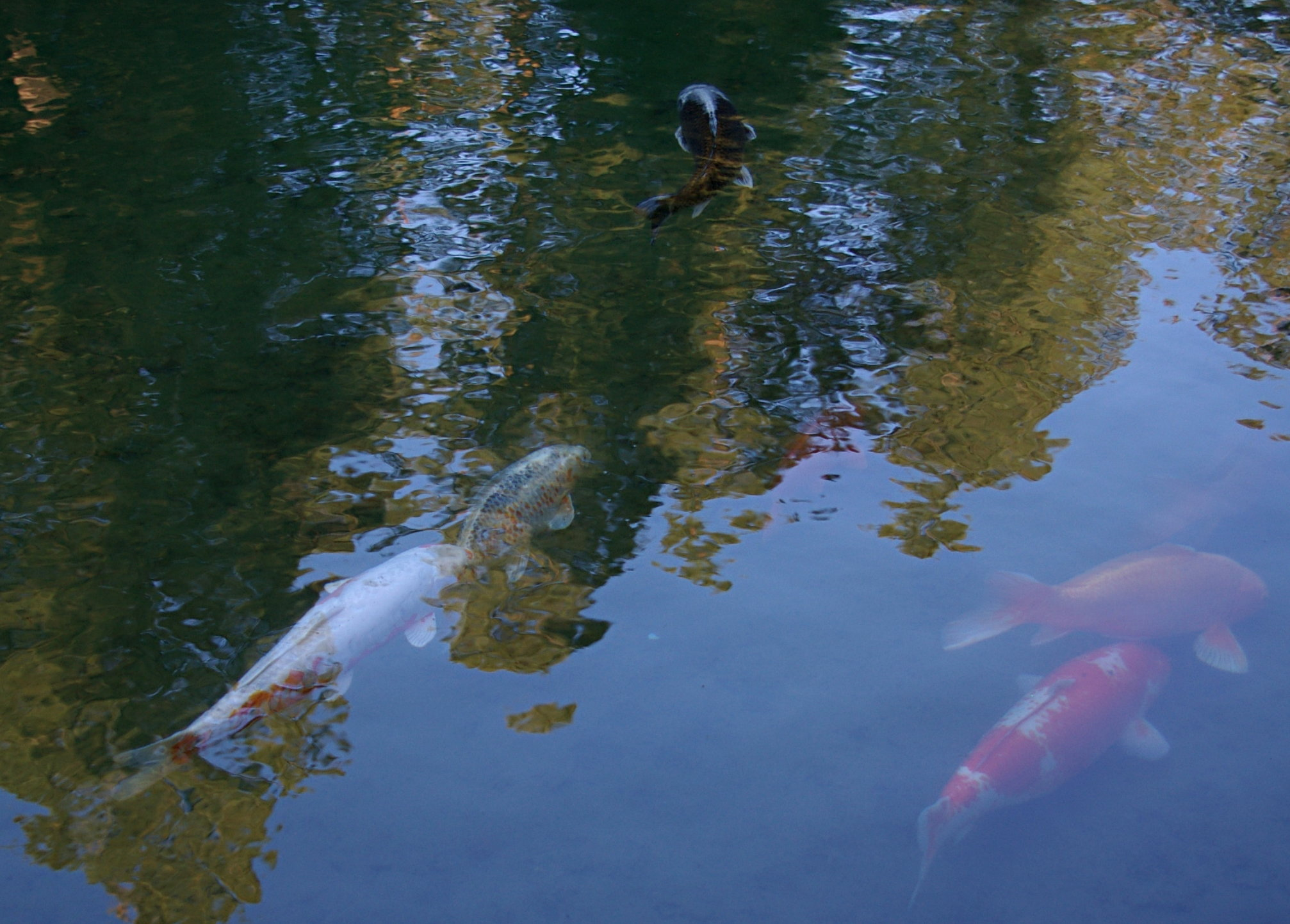
Koi fish seen in the Nishinomiya Japanese Garden

== See also ==
- List of botanical gardens in the United States
