= Nagao Sakurai =

Japanese landscape architect

Nagao Sakurai (桜井長雄) (November 5, 1896 – July 1973) of the Imperial Palace of Tokyo was a landscape architect.

In 1971, Sakurai experienced a stroke while he was working on the Nishinomiya Tsutakawa Japanese Garden. He died in 1973.

== Notable designs ==
- Japanese Tea Garden, Central Park, San Mateo, California
- Nishinomiya Tsutakawa Japanese Garden, Spokane, Washington, 1967
- Zen Garden and area in front of Tea House, both within the Japanese Tea Garden of Golden Gate Park in San Francisco
- The Hannah Carter Japanese Garden, Bel-Air, completed in 1961
- The Japanese Garden in Micke Grove Regional Park, Lodi, California, dedicated in 1965
- Japanese exhibit in the 1939-1940 Golden Gate International Exposition, a specialized World's Fair in Treasure Island, San Francisco
- Japanese exhibit in the 1939 New York World's Fair with Dr. Takashi Tamura

== See also ==
- Gilroy Yamato Hot Springs, after 1938
- William A. Pomeroy garden in Sausalito, 1956
- Robert Pomeroy garden, Quail Hill, in Ross, CA, 1970-1971
