= Rockwood =

Rockwood may refer to:

== Places ==
=== Canada ===
- Rockwood, Manitoba, rural municipality
  - Rockwood (electoral division), former provincial electoral division
- Rockwood, Winnipeg, a neighbourhood
- Rockwood, the main community in Guelph/Eramosa township, Ontario
  - Rockwood Conservation Area
- Rockwood Institution, federal prison in Manitoba
- Rockwood Village - Mississauga, a subdivision in Toronto, Ontario

=== United States ===
- Rockwood Museum and Park, Wilmington, Delaware, listed on the NRHP in Delaware
- Rockwood, Illinois
- Rockwood, Maine
- Rockwood, Michigan
- South Rockwood, Michigan
- Rockwood, Gresham, Oregon
- Rockwood, Pennsylvania
- Rockwood, Tennessee
- Rockwood, Texas
- Rockwood, Virginia
- Rockwood, Wisconsin
- Rockwood Library, Portland, Oregon
- Rockwood Lodge, former training facility of the Green Bay Packers
- Rockwood School District, St. Louis County, Missouri
- Rockwood Area School District, Somerset County, Pennsylvania
  - Rockwood Area Junior/Senior High School, Somerset County, Pennsylvania
- Rockwood Township, Minnesota (disambiguation)
- Rockwood (Dublin, Virginia), listed on the NRHP in Pulaski County, Virginia
- Rockwood (Montpelier Station, Virginia), historic house listed on the NRHP in Virginia
- Rockwood, a South Hill neighborhood in Spokane, Washington
  - Rockwood Historic District, Spokane, WA, listed on the NRHP in Spokane County, Washington
- Rockwood / East 188th Avenue, light rail station in Gresham, Oregon
- Rockwood Municipal Airport, general aviation airport near Rockwood, Tennessee
- Rockwood Precinct, Randolph County, Illinois
- Rockwood Chocolate Factory Historic District, Brooklyn, New York

== People ==
- Albert P. Rockwood (1805-1879), LDS leader
- Angela Rockwood, model and actress
- George G. Rockwood (1832-1911), New York City photographer
- John Rockwood (1881-1935), physician, army officer, and cricket administrator in Ceylon
- Lawrence Rockwood (b. 1958), human rights activist
- Roy Rockwood, pseudonym of several authors of books for boys
- W. G. Rockwood (1843-1909), physician and politician in Ceylon
- Wendell D. Rockwood, Massachusetts politician
- Ebenezer Rockwood Hoar (1816-1895), American politician and justice
- Rockwood Hoar (1855-1906), Massachusetts politician

== Other ==
- Rockwood & Company, chocolate company based in Brooklyn, New York, USA

== See also ==
- Rockwood Academy (disambiguation)
- Rockwood Park (disambiguation)
- Rookwood (disambiguation)
