= Rockwood Township, Minnesota =

Rockwood Township is the name of some places in the U.S. state of Minnesota:

- Rockwood Township, Hubbard County, Minnesota
- Rockwood Township, Wadena County, Minnesota
