= Rockwood Academy =

Rockwood Academy may refer to:

- Rockwood Academy, Birmingham, a secondary school in Alum Rock, Birmingham, England
- Rockwood Academy (Ontario), a former private school in Rockwood, Ontario, Canada

== See also ==
- Rockwood (disambiguation)
