= Rockwood Township, Hubbard County, Minnesota =

Rockwood Township, Minnesota
- Township
- Location of Rockwood Township, within Hubbard County, Minnesota
- Coordinates: 47°21′44″N 94°58′49″W
- Country: United States
- State: Minnesota
- County: Hubbard

Area
  - Total: 36.0 sq mi (93.3 km^{2})
  - Land: 33.2 sq mi (85.9 km^{2})
  - Water: 2.9 sq mi (7.4 km^{2})
- Elevation: 1,388 ft (423 m)

Population (2020)
  - Total: 390
  - Density: 12/sq mi (4.5/km^{2})
- Time zone: UTC-6 (Central (CST))
  - Summer (DST): UTC-5 (CDT)
- FIPS code: 27-55132
- GNIS feature ID: 0665442

Rockwood Township is a township in Hubbard County, Minnesota, United States, not to be confused with Rockwood Township in Wadena County. The population was 390 at the 2020 census.

Rockwood Township derives its name from Charles H. Rockwell, an early settler.

== Geography ==
According to the United States Census Bureau, the township has a total area of 36.0 square miles (93.3 km^{2}), of which 33.2 square miles (85.9 km^{2}) is land and 2.9 square miles (7.4 km^{2}) (7.97%) is water.

== Demographics ==
As of the census of 2000, there were 469 people, 158 households, and 139 families residing in the township. The population density was 14.1 people per square mile (5.5/km^{2}). There were 247 housing units at an average density of 7.5/sq mi (2.9/km^{2}). The racial makeup of the township was 96.16% White, 0.21% African American, 2.13% Native American, 0.85% Asian, and 0.64% from two or more races. Hispanic or Latino of any race were 0.43% of the population.

There were 158 households, out of which 41.1% had children under the age of 18 living with them, 82.3% were married couples living together, 4.4% had a female householder with no husband present, and 11.4% were non-families. 9.5% of all households were made up of individuals, and 3.8% had someone living alone who was 65 years of age or older. The average household size was 2.97 and the average family size was 3.14.

In the township the population was spread out, with 30.7% under the age of 18, 3.8% from 18 to 24, 29.9% from 25 to 44, 24.5% from 45 to 64, and 11.1% who were 65 years of age or older. The median age was 37 years. For every 100 females, there were 111.3 males. For every 100 females age 18 and over, there were 104.4 males.

The median income for a household in the township was $46,563, and the median income for a family was $47,639. Males had a median income of $36,250 versus $22,188 for females. The per capita income for the township was $15,305. About 7.1% of families and 8.6% of the population were below the poverty line, including 8.3% of those under age 18 and 22.5% of those age 65 or over.
