= Rockwood Township, Wadena County, Minnesota =

Rockwood Township, Minnesota
- Township
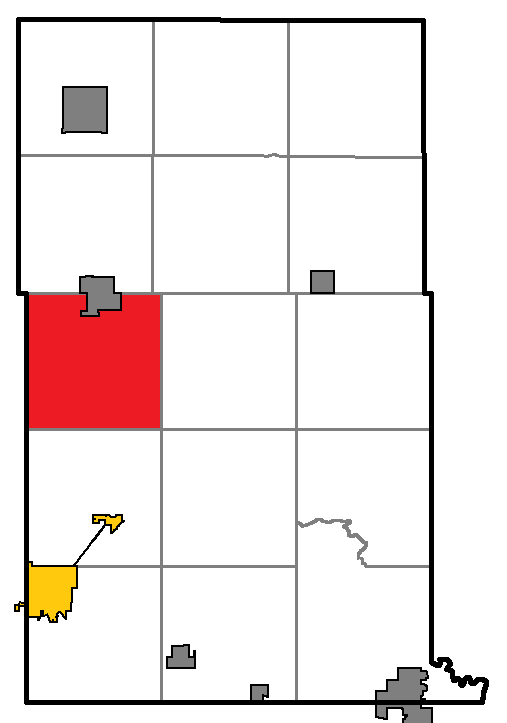
- Location of Rockwood Township, within Wadena County, Minnesota
- Coordinates: 46°34′54″N 95°4′2″W
- Country: United States
- State: Minnesota
- County: Wadena

Area
  - Total: 34.6 sq mi (89.5 km^{2})
  - Land: 34.6 sq mi (89.5 km^{2})
  - Water: 0 sq mi (0.0 km^{2})
- Elevation: 1,414 ft (431 m)

Population (2020)
  - Total: 386
  - Density: 11.2/sq mi (4.31/km^{2})
- Time zone: UTC-6 (Central (CST))
  - Summer (DST): UTC-5 (CDT)
- FIPS code: 27-55150
- GNIS feature ID: 0665443

Rockwood Township is a township in Wadena County, Minnesota, United States, not to be confused with Rockwood Township, Hubbard County, Minnesota. The population was 386 at the 2020 census.

According to Warren Upham, Rockwood Township was probably named after its forests and rocks deposited by glaciers in the Ice Age.

== Geography ==
According to the United States Census Bureau, the township has a total area of 34.6 square miles (89.5 km^{2}), all of it land.

== Demographics ==
As of the census of 2010, there were 390 people, 149 households, and 114 families residing in the township. The population density was 11.3 people per square mile (4.4/km^{2}). There were 166 total housing units at an average density of 4.8/sq mi (1.9/km^{2}). The racial makeup of the township was 97.4% White, 0.3% African American, 0.3% Asian, 1.1% from other races, and 1.0% from two or more races. Hispanic or Latino of any race were 1.8% of the population.

There were 149 households, out of which 28.9% had children under the age of 18 living with them, 66.4% were married couples living together, 5.4% had a female householder with no husband present, and 23.5% were non-families. 18.8% of all households were made up of individuals, and 8.7% had someone living alone who was 65 years of age or older. The average household size was 2.62 and the average family size was 2.99.

In the township the population was spread out, with 19.0% under the age of 15, 11.8% from 15 to 24, 19.2% from 25 to 44, 32.6% from 45 to 64, and 17.4% who were 65 years of age or older. The median age was 45 years. For every 100 females, there were 106.3 males. For every 100 females age 18 and over, there were 109.2 males.

The median income for a household in the township was $47,250, and the median income for a family was $51,250. Males had a median income of $38,438 versus $25,500 for females. The per capita income for the township was $22,267. About 7.4% of families and 9.2% of the population were below the poverty line, including 6.3% of those under age 18 and 19.7% of those age 65 or over.
