= Rockwood Historic District =

Historic district in Spokane, Washington

- U.S. National Register of Historic Places
- U.S. Historic district
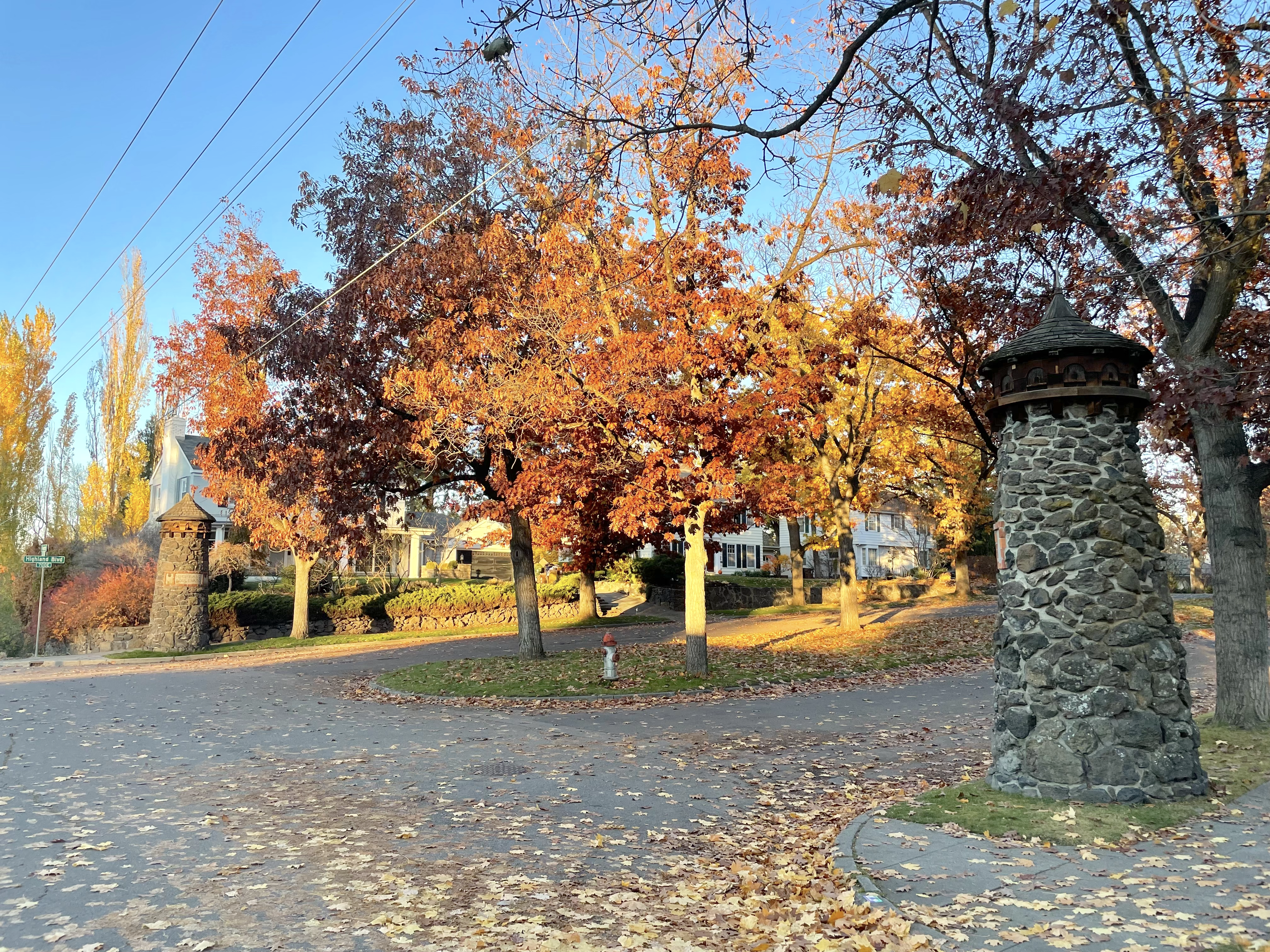
- Stone towers at the entrance to the district

- Location within Washington (state) Location within the United States
- Location: Rockwood, Spokane, Washington, United States
- Coordinates: 47°38′14.8″N 117°23′55.7″W
- Area: 180 acres (73 ha)
- Built: 1906–1950
- Architect: Multiple
- Architectural style: Tudor Revival, Classical Revival, Twentieth century architectural styles
- NRHP reference No.: 97000320
- Added to NRHP: April 14, 1997

The Rockwood Historic District is a historic residential area in the Rockwood neighborhood on the south side of Spokane, Washington. The district was listed on the National Register of Historic Places (NRHP) in 1997 due to the concentration of historic homes within the district as well as its significance in the areas of architecture, landscape architecture, and community planning and development.

The district, which at the time of its listing on the NRHP contained 297 contributing buildings along with 71 non-contributing buildings, stretches from roughly 10th Avenue in the north to 29th Avenue in the south, following Rockwood Boulevard and Garfield Road and extending approximately one block on either side of those two streets.

Multiple architects were responsible for the design and construction of the numerous historic homes in the district, which reflect the Tudor Revival and Classical Revival styles as well as many other residential designs common to the first half of the 20th century. From 14th Avenue south, the Olmsted Brothers were responsible for the landscape design which incorporates curving streets, boulevards and parkways which contrast with the surrounding street grid.

== Setting ==
Located in the Rockwood Neighborhood on Spokane's South Hill, the Rockwood Historic District follows Rockwood Boulevard from approximately 11th Avenue on the north as the boulevard winds its way along and up a steep basalt bluff. At around 21st Avenue Rockwood curves to the east and leaves the historic district, at that point Garfield Road continues up the final portion of the bluff and the historic district follows that road to 29th Avenue in the south.

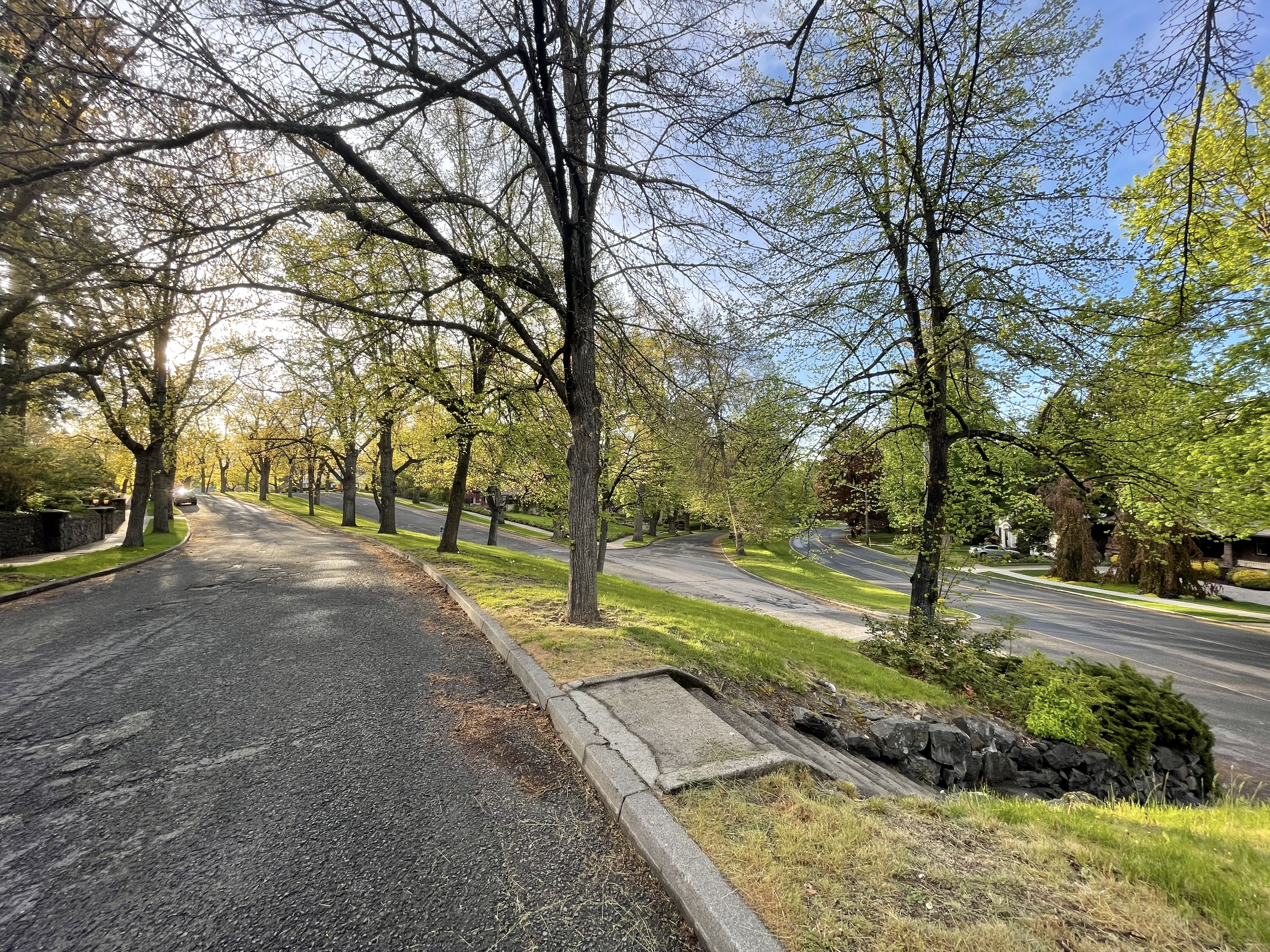
Intersection of Highland Road, Upper Terrace, and Rockwood Boulevard in Spring 2022.

Rockwood Boulevard enters the historic district at roughly 2,140 feet above sea level in the north. The elevation rises to approximately 2,340 feet at 29th Avenue on the southern boundary of the district. Rockwood Boulevard's curved path largely follows along the lower side of a steep bluff which winds across the area. Early neighborhood developer Jay P. Graves choose to embrace the terrain rather than view it as an obstacle, and as a result many of the district's oldest and grandest homes sit atop or immediately below the steep bluff, which in some places is a vertical cliff.

From the northern end of the district to approximately 23rd Avenue, the terrain is quite hilly. From 23rd Avenue to the southern edge at 29th Avenue the elevation gain is much more gradual and the terrain is relatively flat compared to the northern portions of the district. Exposed basalt rock is common in the more rugged area north of 23rd Avenue, with less dramatic basalt outcroppings in the south along Rhyolite Road and Plateau Road. Many of the Ponderosa Pine and Douglas Fir trees in the area at the time of development were left in place and now form an extensive canopy over large portions of the historic district. Along the parkways and boulevards designed by the Olmsted Brothers, many species of Maple, Oak and Linden were planted in rows as shade trees.

== History ==
The City of Spokane was formally incorporated in 1881 encompassing an area of 1.56 square miles that now comprises part of the downtown core. Part of what would become the Rockwood Historic District, specifically the area north of 14th Avenue and closest to the original city, was first incorporated into the city two years later in December 1883. The remainder of the current district was incorporated in April 1891.

Development of the area did not begin in earnest until around the turn of the century, when the northern portion of the district was replatted as part of the Rockwood Addition and Manito Park Second Addition in 1909. The first stage of major development lasted from 1908 through 1915 and the second took place between 1936 and 1942. During the first of those two periods, 64 homes were built with 21 in 1912 alone. During the latter period, 101 homes were built with a single-year high of 33 in 1939. Steady development also occurred between those two busier stages.

Some of the earliest and grandest homes in the district were built along the bluff above Rockwood Boulevard which offered views of the city and surrounding areas including a 24-room Tudor Revival home for businessman August Paulsen and a Mission Style home secluded behind a stucco wall for district investor Frank Graves. Around this time and surrounding these homes, numerous other large homes were built in the Tudor Revival, American Craftsman, American Foursquare and Colonial Revival styles between 1910 and 1914.

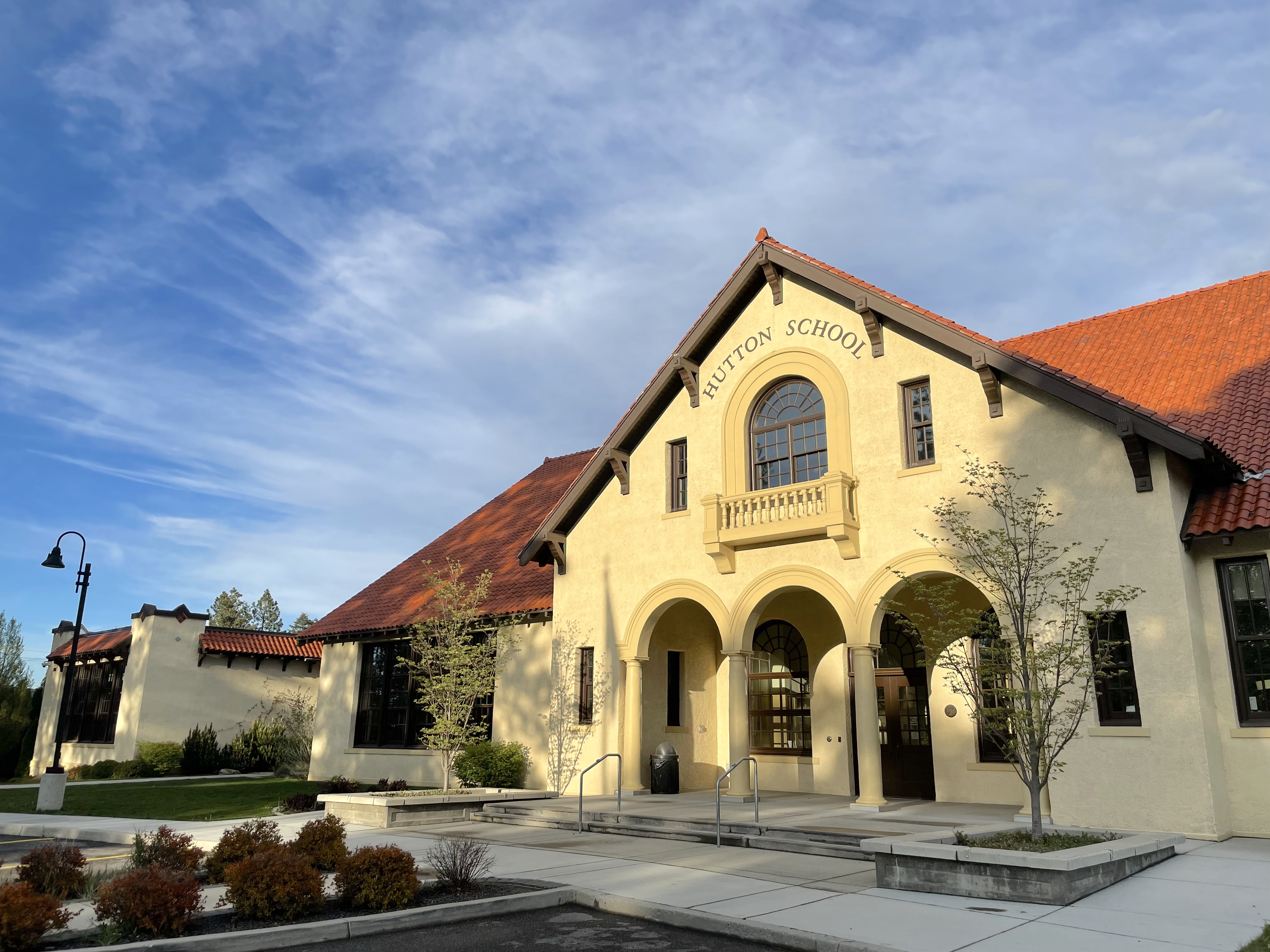
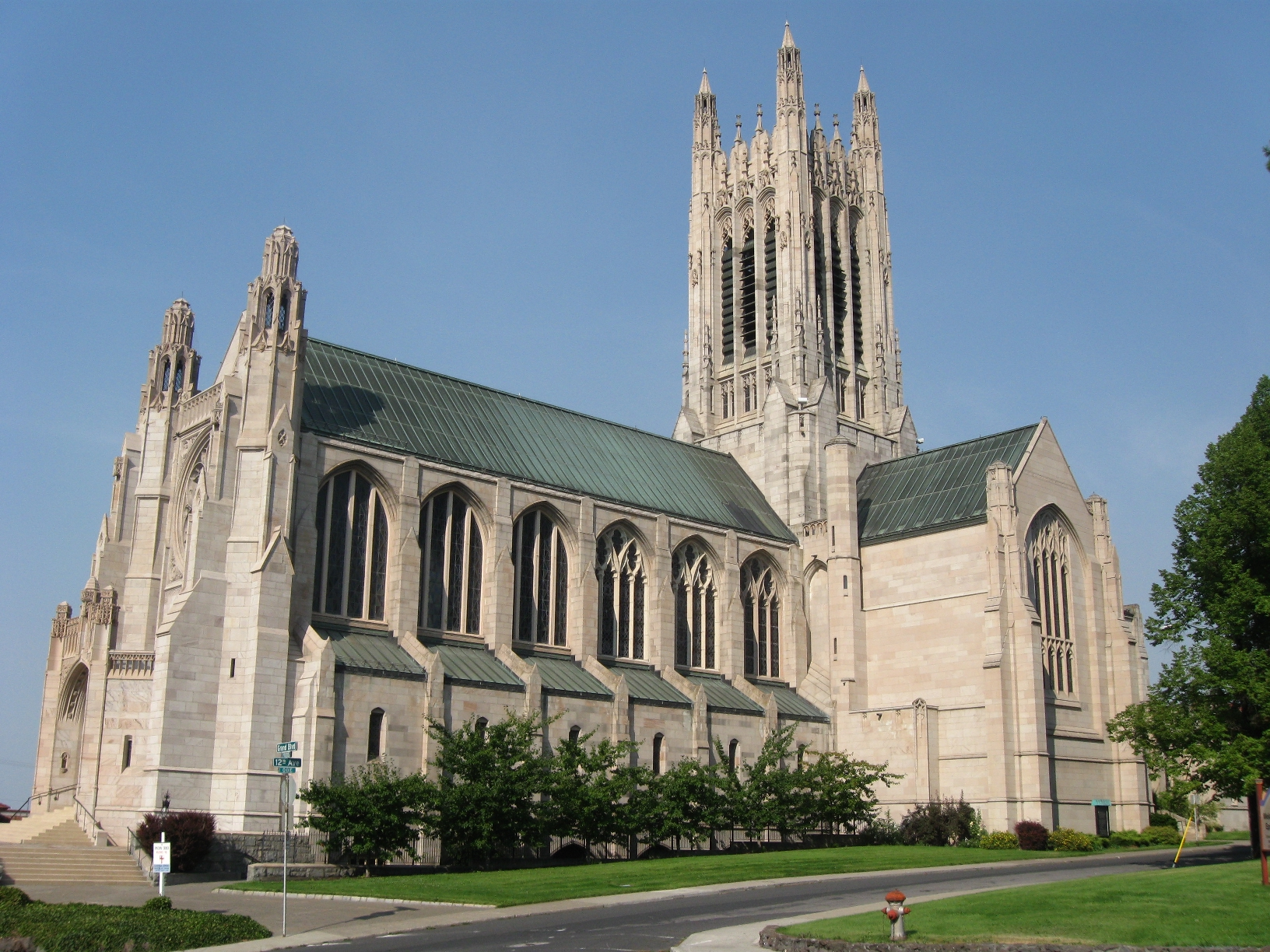
Hutton Elementary School and the Cathedral of St. John the Evangelist

There are two notable non-residential properties in the district, Hutton Elementary School and The Cathedral of St. John the Evangelist. Hutton Elementary, located at the intersection of Plateau Road and 24th Ave was built in a Spanish Eclectic style in 1921, with additional additions designed to match the original style were added in 1949. Those additions were removed during an expansion and modernization effort completed in 2015, but the original 1921 structure was left and subsequently added to the Spokane Historic Register. Construction on the English Gothic-style Cathedral of St. John the Evangelist in the far northwest end of the district began in 1925 and was completed in 1929, though further additions including the cathedral's iconic tower which is visible from locations around the city, continued until 1954.

World War I slowed construction across the city, including in Rockwood, but picked up again after the war ended. In the decade which followed, over 70 homes were built in the district. It was in the years and decades which followed World War I that stonemason and architect John E. Anderson put his mark on the visual aesthetic of the neighborhood with the addition of Spanish Colonial-style homes. In the recovery from the Great Depression most of the remaining lots in the district were developed, with limited development occurring in the district in the decades since.

Of the 350 homes in the district at the time of its listing on the NRHP in, 285 were built prior to 1950. Most of the non-contributing properties in the district, built after 1950, are clustered around the area of Crest Road and Crest Hill Drive. The few vacant plots remaining have proven challenging to build upon due to terrain considerations.

== Historical images ==
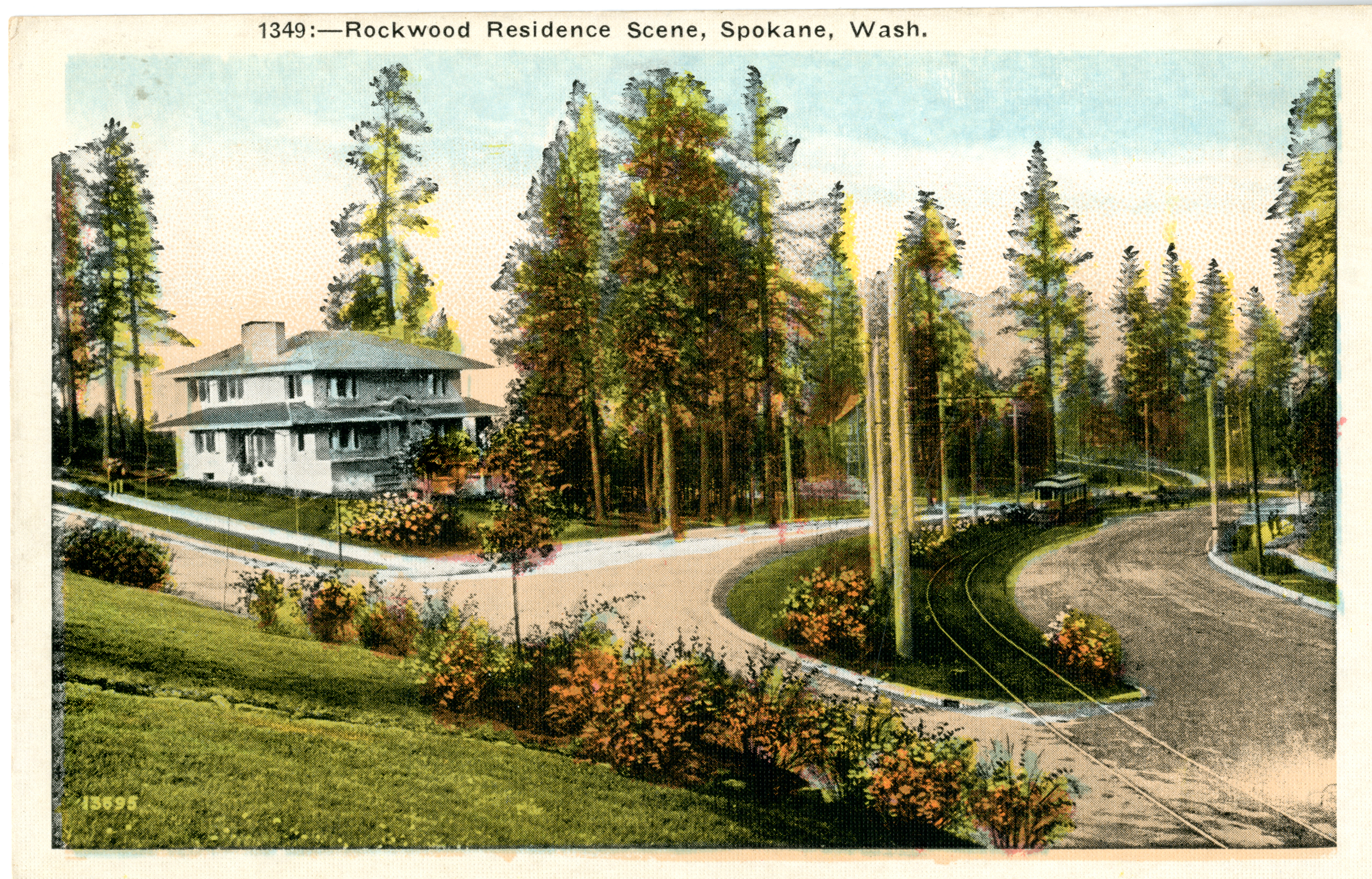
Intersection of Highland Road, Upper Terrace, and Rockwood Boulevard circa 1910–1925

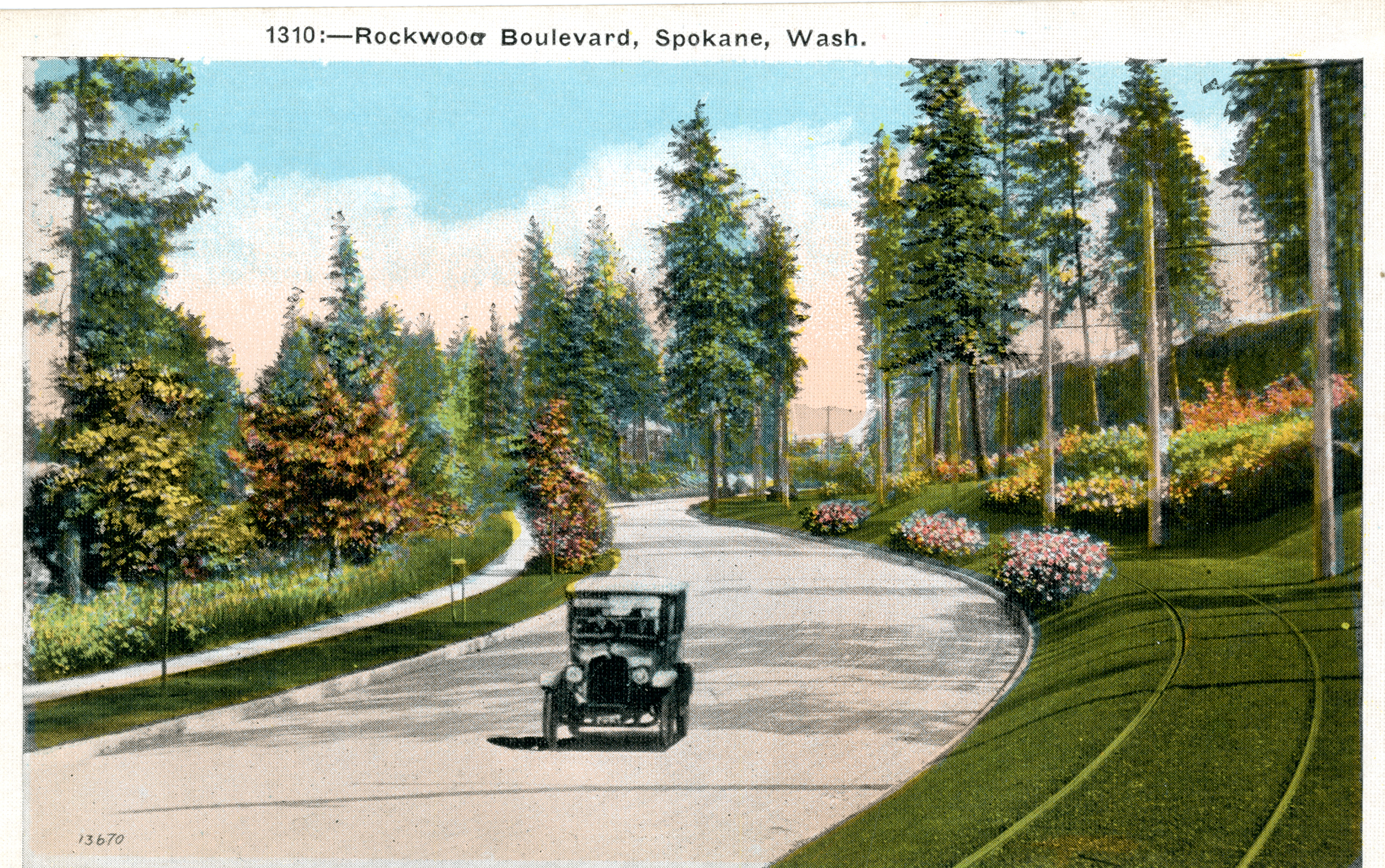
Rockwood Boulevard looking south circa 1910–1925

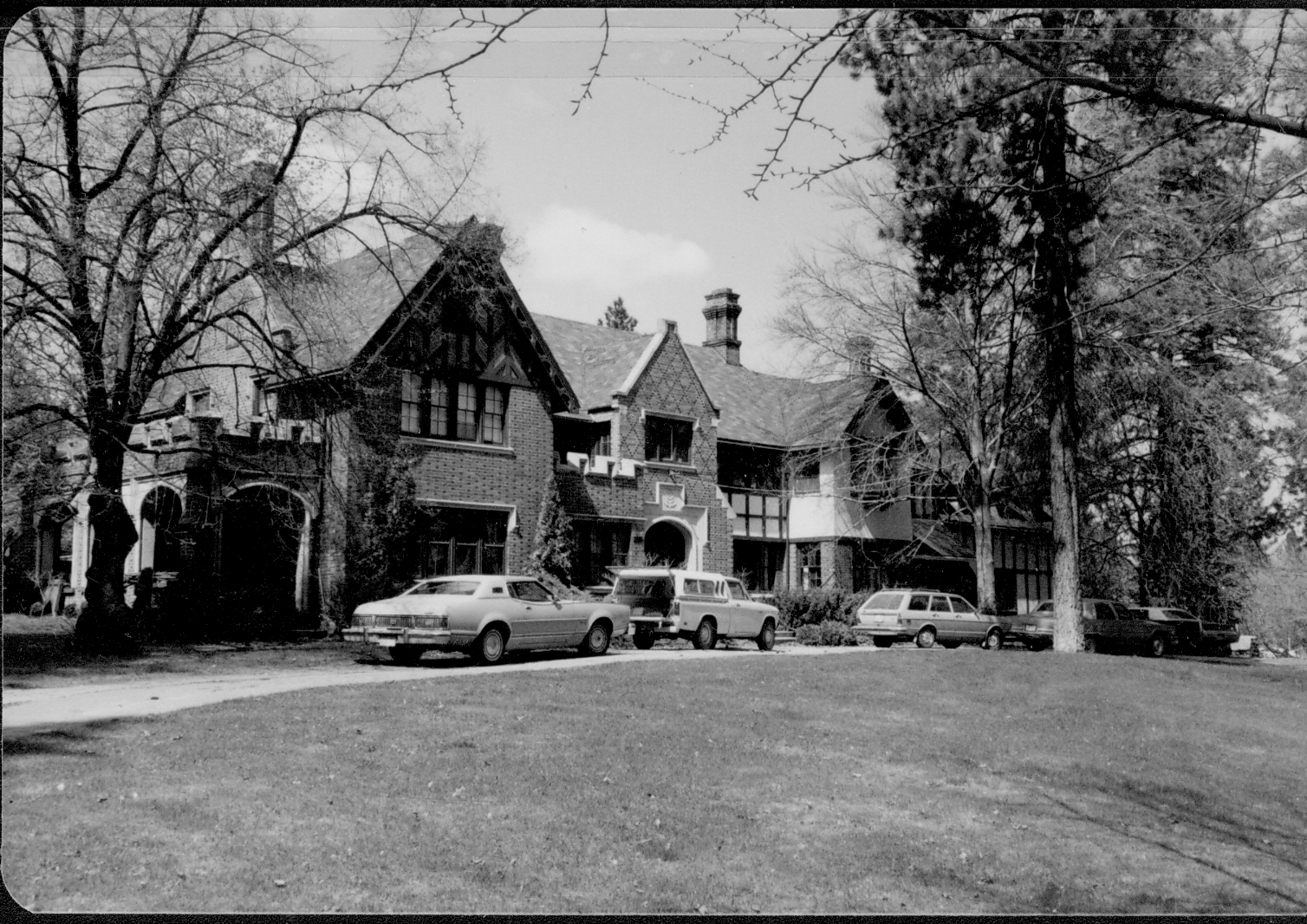
The Gibbs House at Rockwood and Garfield in 1979

== See also ==
- Rockwood, Spokane
- National Register of Historic Places listings in Spokane County, Washington
