= Rookwood =

Rookwood could refer to:

Places:

- Rookwood, New South Wales, a suburb of Sydney, Australia
- Rookwood Cemetery in Sydney, Australia
- Rookwood, Queensland, a locality in the Shire of Mareeba, Australia

People:

- Ambrose Rookwood, part of the Gunpowder Plot of 1605

Fictional characters:

- Augustus Rookwood, a minor Death Eater character in the Harry Potter novels
- Rookwood, a minor character V impersonates in V for Vendetta

Other:

- Rookwood Pottery Company, a pottery manufacturer based in Cincinnati, Ohio
- Rookwood (novel), a novel by William Harrison Ainsworth published in 1834
