= Rockwood, Spokane =

Rockwood
- Spokane Neighborhood
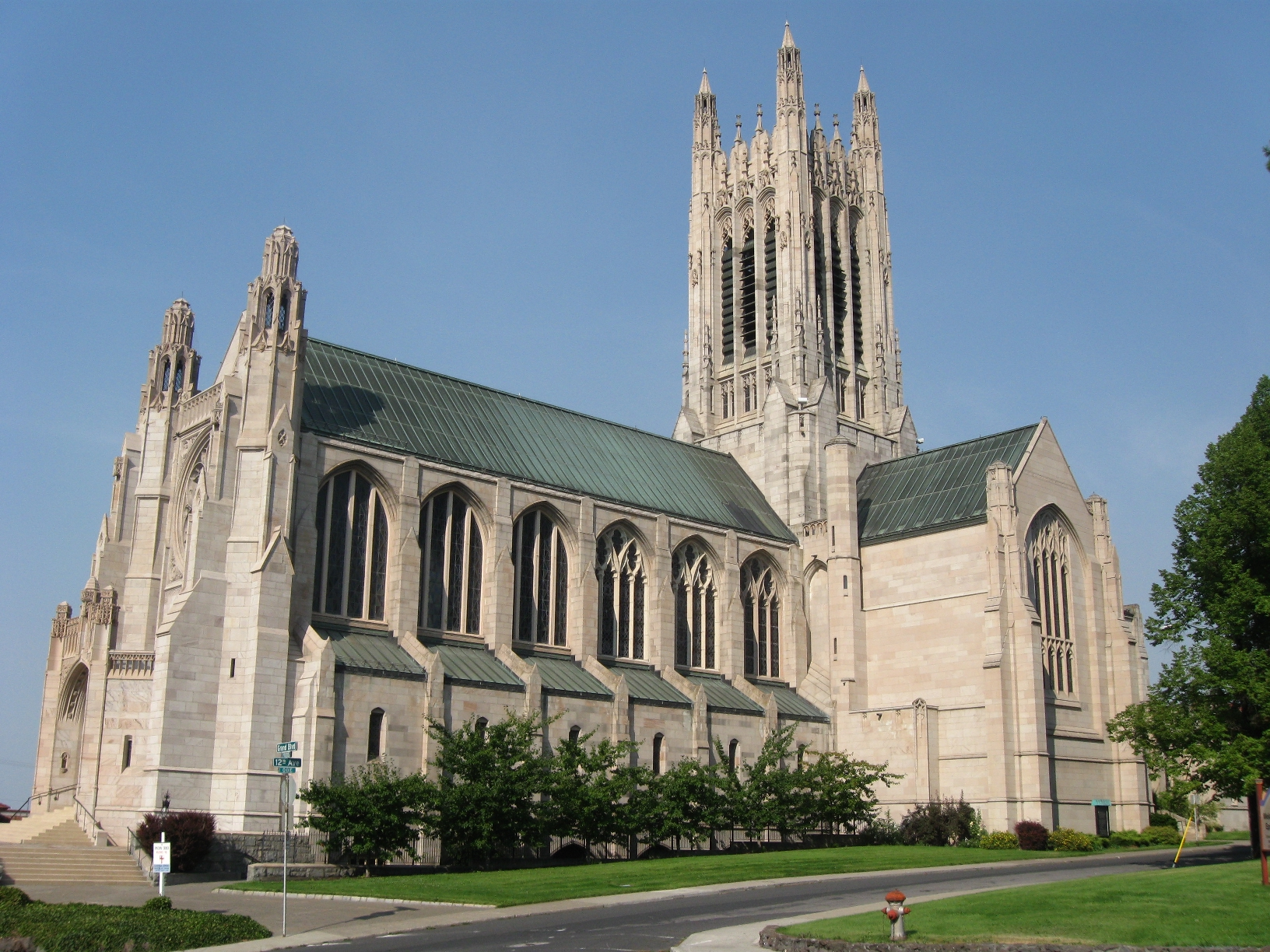
- St. John's Cathedral in Rockwood

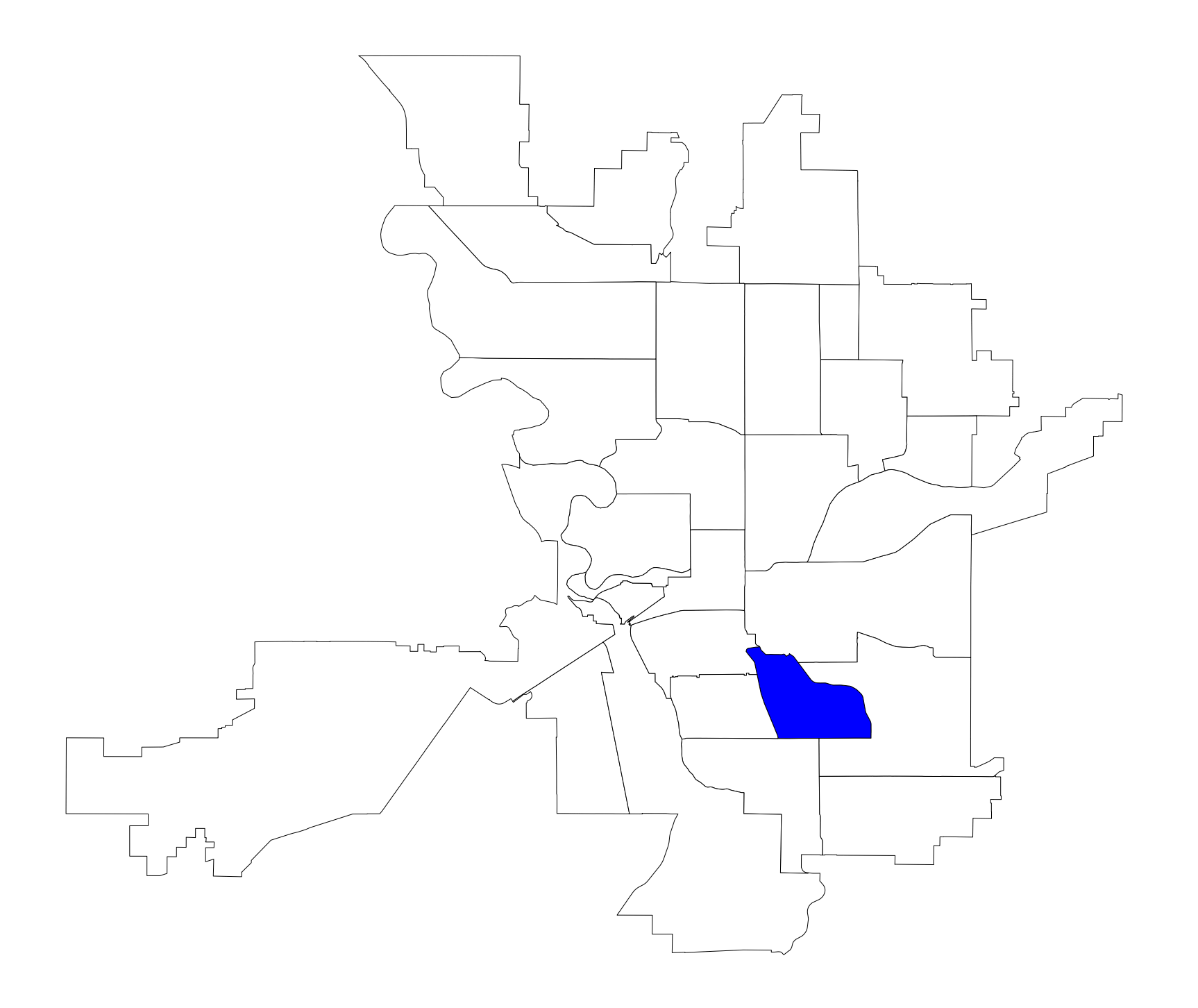
- Location within the city of Spokane
- Coordinates: 47°37′56.9″N 117°23′40.1″W
- Country: United States
- State: Washington
- County: Spokane
- City: Spokane

Population (2017)
  - Total: 4,337

Demographics 2017
  - White: 92.7%
  - Latinx: 3.7%
  - Asian: 1.8%
  - American Indian: 1.1%
  - Black: 0.8%
- Time zone: UTC-8 (PST)
  - Summer (DST): UTC-7 (PDT)
- ZIP Codes: 99203 and 99202
- Area code: 509

Rockwood is a neighborhood in Spokane, Washington. It is located on the south side of the city to the southeast of Downtown Spokane and expanding southeasterly from close to the city center. Its proximity to downtown makes it one of Spokane's older neighborhoods, with mature trees lining most of its streets. Due to its location on the hill leading up from the Spokane River Valley, the street grid breaks down in many places around Rockwood. The most notable of these is along the winding Rockwood Boulevard, which was designed by the Olmsted Brothers and weaves its way from the northwesternmost corner of the neighborhood through the center and across to the eastern border, highlighting the basalt bluffs and other natural topography.

It is one of the more affluent neighborhoods in the Spokane community. Many old, large homes are located in Rockwood, especially in the Rockwood Historic District. Unlike many of the other old neighborhoods surrounding the Spokane city center, the vast majority of the large homes in Rockwood continue to serve as single-family housing.

== Geography ==
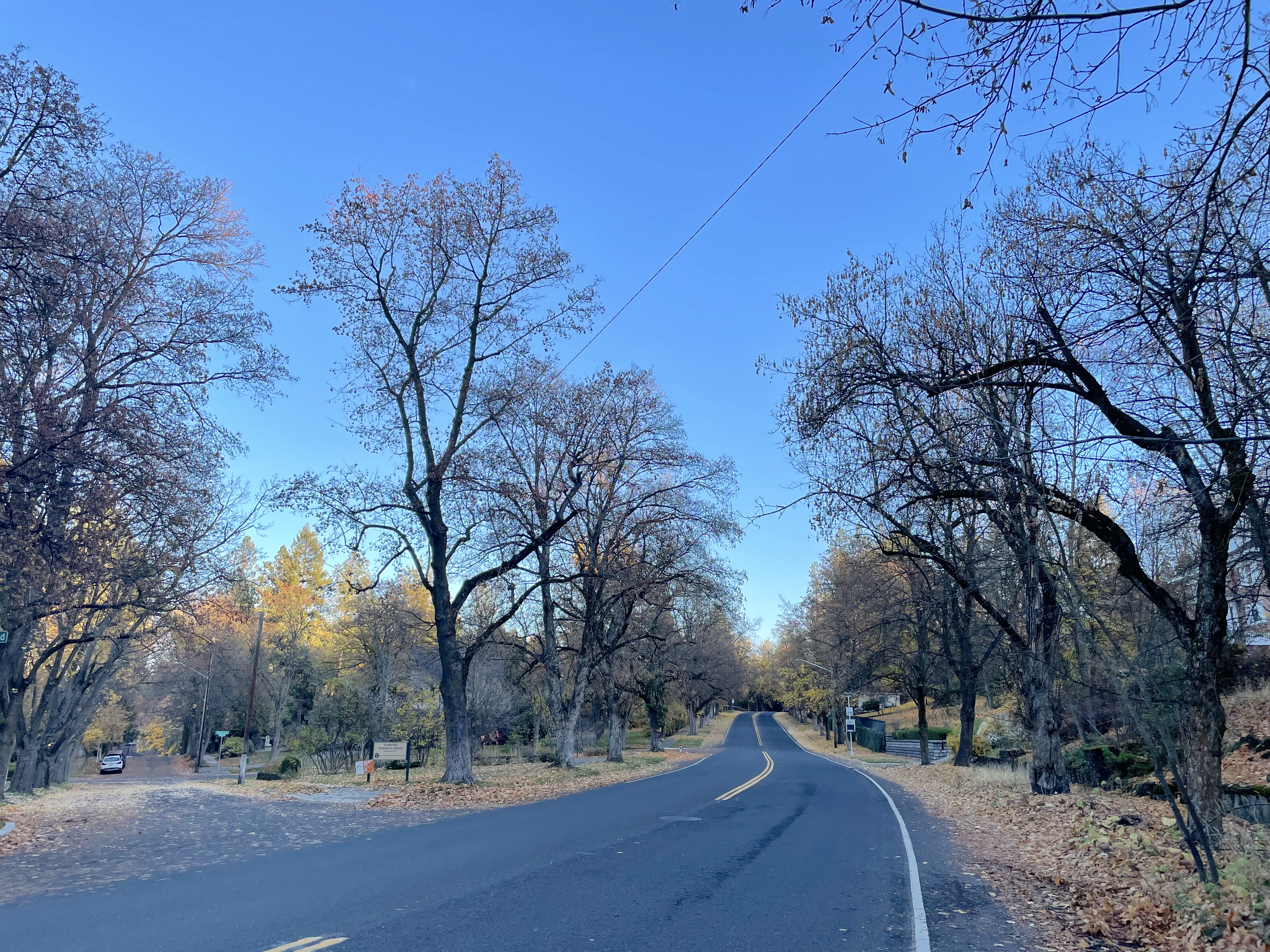
Rockwood Boulevard at 12th Avenue in autumn

Grand Boulevard, a major north–south thoroughfare, is the neighborhood's western boundary and 29th street, a major east–west thoroughfare, bounds Rockwood on the south. Southeast Boulevard serves as the majority of the neighborhood's eastern and northern boundaries. Between Grand and Southeast Boulevards, about five block lengths of side streets act as the boundary between Rockwood on the south and East Central to the north.

Within the neighborhood is the Rockwood Historic District, which is listed on the National Register of Historic Places. The district is about two blocks wide between Hatch and Arthur streets from 29th Avenue on the south to 14th Avenue on the north, from which it continues turns to the northwest and continues to the northwesternmost corner of the neighborhood. This area of the neighborhood was designed by noted landscape architects, the Olmsted Brothers. It features streets that curve around exposed basalt outcroppings and through old ponderosa pine and Douglas fir forest as they wind their way up the hill from downtown. The Olmsteds were fond of diagonal streets such as Southeast Boulevard that borders the neighborhood. The Rockwood neighborhood borders two of the city's larger parks, Manito Park to the west and Lincoln Park to the east, but does not contain any true parks within its boundaries. However, in the Rockwood Historic Districts, four small grassy islands are located on Garfield Road and Rockwood Boulevard, known as the Olmsted Triangle Parks, as well as a pair of grassy boulevards that intersect at the intersection of Upper Terrace Road and Rockwood and Highland Boulevards. The neighborhood's terrain is reflected in many of the street names, like the aforementioned Rockwood, Highland and Upper Terrace, as well as Crest Road and Overbluff Drive.

The neighborhood is overwhelmingly residential, though commercial districts exist in the northwest along Grand Boulevard extending north from 14th Avenue and in the southeast along 29th Avenue from Pittsburgh Street and extending east into the Lincoln Heights neighborhood. Hutton Elementary School is located in the middle of the neighborhood at 24th Avenue and Plateau Road.

== History ==
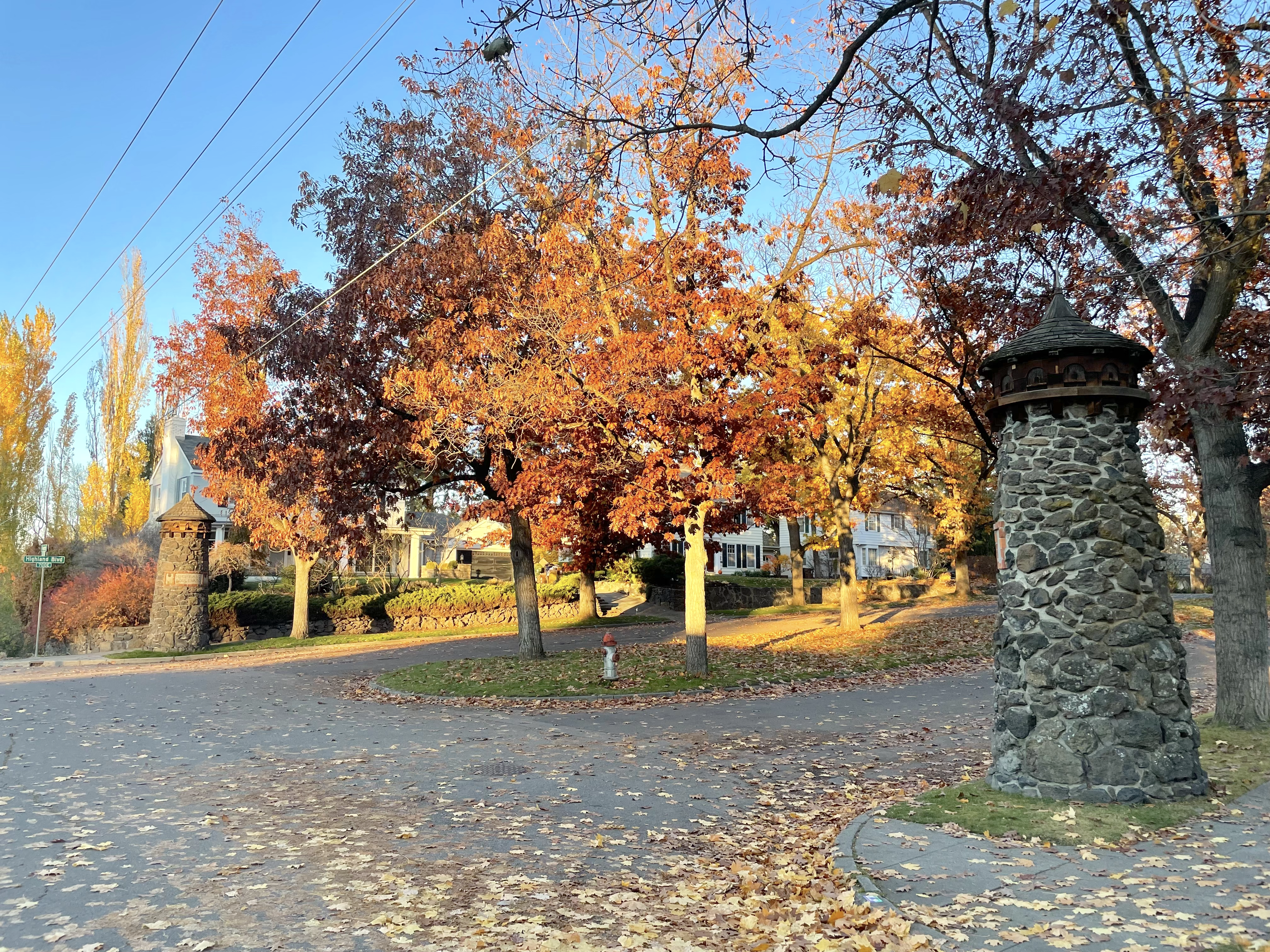
Stone towers topped with bird houses mark the entrance to the Rockwood Historic District on Highland Boulevard

In the 1880s, Rockwood was known as Montrose for the hilly terrain and patches of wild roses growing in the area. Frances Cook, one of the first European settlers in the area, owned much of the land now part of Rockwood. Cook laid a streetcar line into the neighborhood, and had plans for more development, but he was forced to sell his holdings during the Panic of 1893. Development of the neighborhood continued when mining magnate Jay P. Graves acquired much of the Cook's land and extended streetcar service through the area.

The neighborhood began to take on its current form in 1907, when the Olmsted Brothers were hired to plan and design the Rockwood area. Their plan was funded for $1 million in 1910. This area is now preserved as the Rockwood Historic District and is known for its tree-lined streets and large homes set well back from the curb.

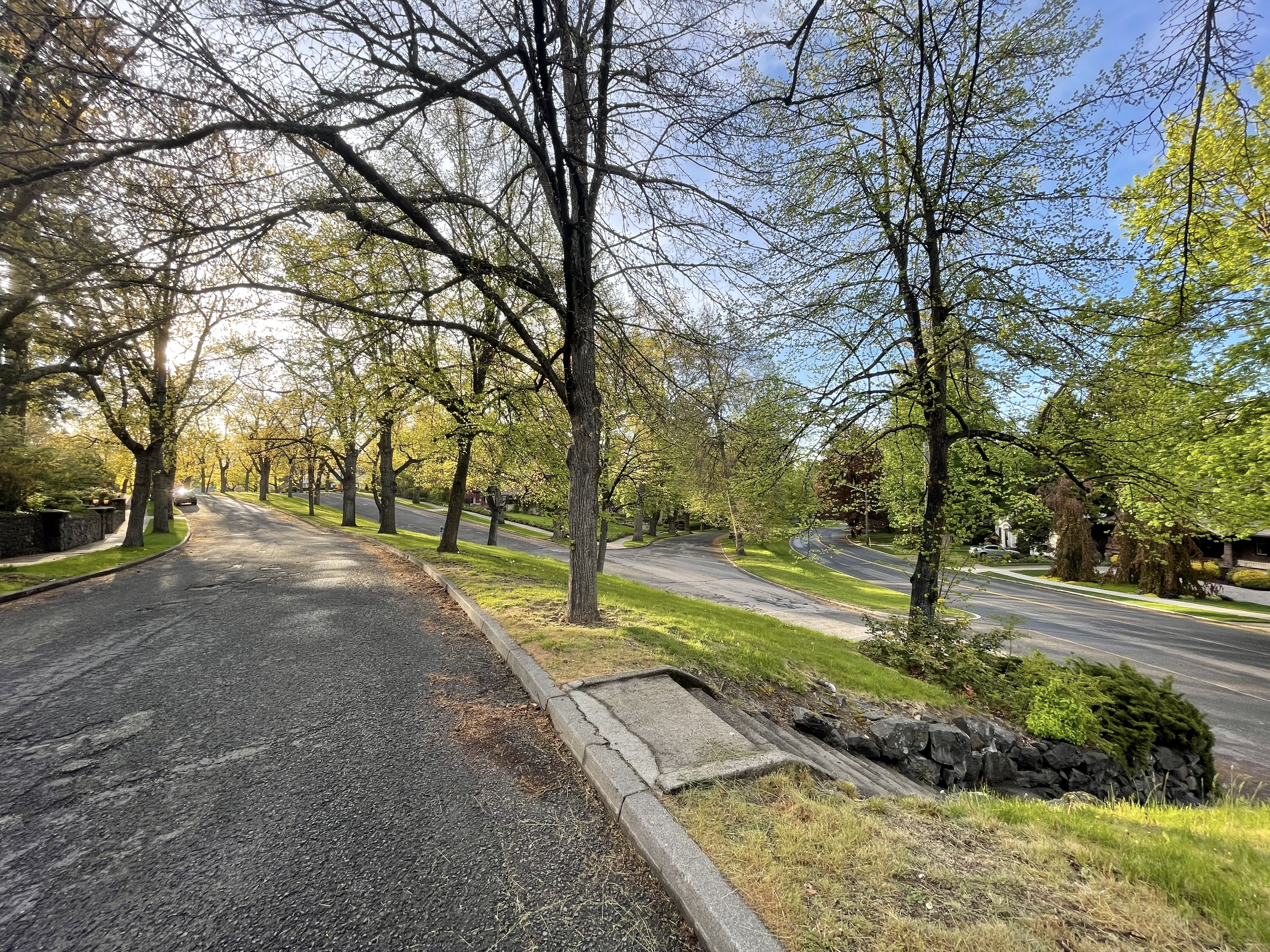
Intersection of Rockwood and Highland Boulevards and Upper Terrace Drive

With the neighborhood experiencing rapid growth and development in the second decade of the 20th century, there became the need for a school in Rockwood. A one-room school was built in 1917, and soon replaced by a much larger facility. In 1920, Hutton School was built in the south-central area of the neighborhood. It was designed in a Spanish eclectic style, with stucco walls, red tile roofing, arched entryways and windows, and exposed wooden beams. The school has subsequently been expanded on three occasions, in 1949 and 1956, and then in 2015 when the 1949 and 1956 expansions were removed and replaced with a new, two-story structure for cost of $29 million. The historic 1921 building remains intact and contains the main entrance, library, offices and some classrooms. The building was listed on the Spokane Register of Historic Places in 2015.

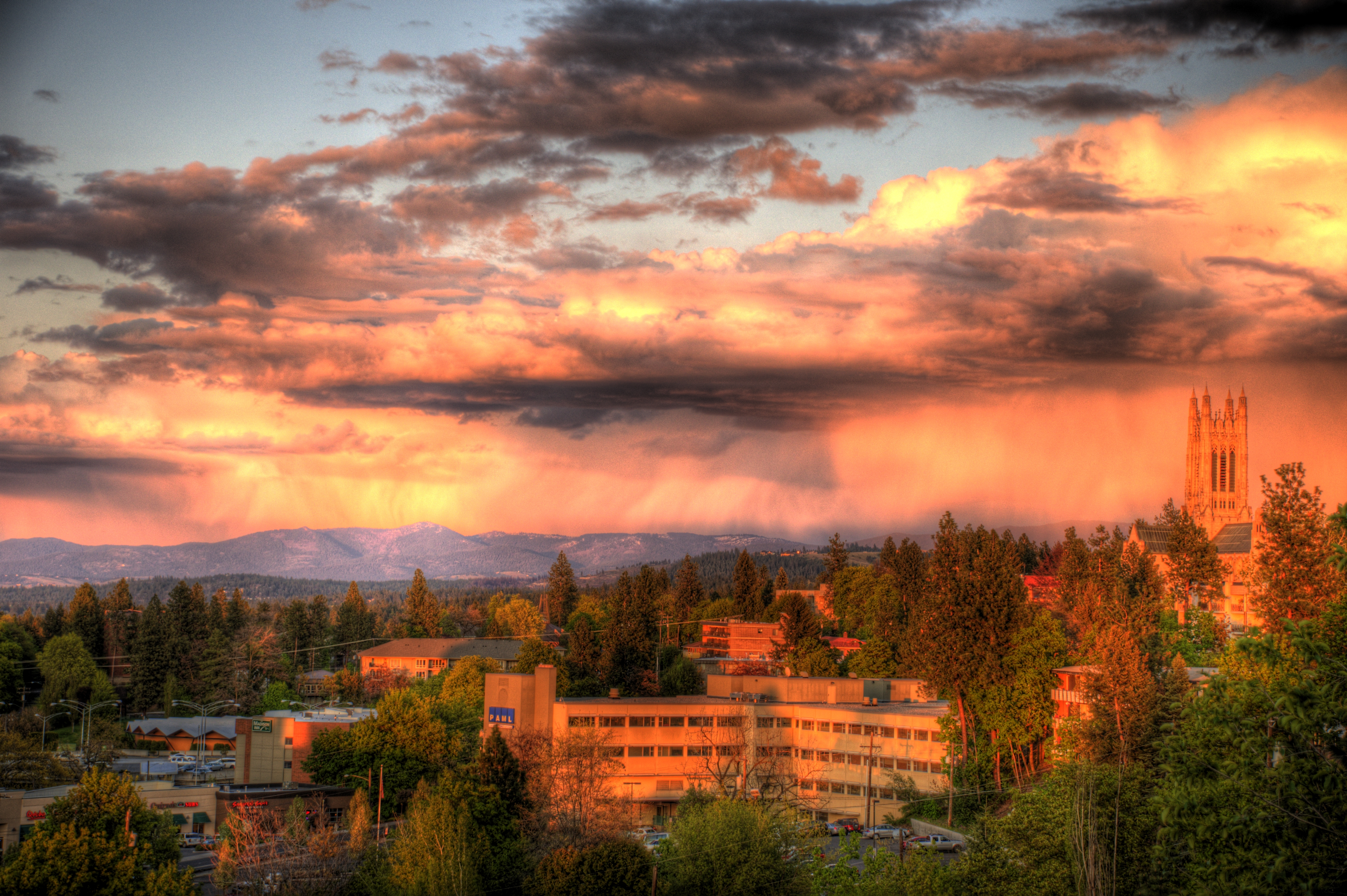
Cathedral of St. John the Evangelist

Construction on neighborhood's most iconic structure, St. John's Cathedral, began in 1925 on a bluff in Rockwood's far northwestern corner. The 180 foot tall Gothic Revival structure is built entirely from cut stone. Its height, combined with its setting on a bluff at the crest of the steep hill leading up from Downtown, makes the cathedral a landmark visible from areas to the north, east and west.

Streetcars connected Rockwood with the rest of the city until 1935, when the service was abandoned citywide. Remnants of the streetcar era are still visible in places along the former route, which followed Rockwood Boulevard. The grassy median on the south and west side of the winding road was once the streetcar platform. The median retains the step-up appearance of the former platform.

In 1997, the older portions of Rockwood were added to the National Register of Historic Places (NRHP) as the Rockwood Historic District.

=== Historic places ===
In addition to the Rockwood Historic District, the Rockwood neighborhood is home to 3 other properties listed on the NRHP on their own merit.

	Name on the Register	Image	Date listed	Location	Description
1	George and Blanche Christiansen House	George and Blanche Christiansen House	December 8, 2015 (#15000881)	1329 E. Overbluff Rd. 47°38′09″N 117°23′25″W	Built in 1926
2	McMillen-Dyar House	McMillen-Dyar House	August 26, 2019 (#100004330)	526 E 12th Ave. 47°38′39″N 117°24′11″W	
3	William and Margaret Solby House	William and Margaret Solby House	August 16, 2007 (#07000831)	1325 E. 20th Ave. 47°38′20″N 117°23′25″W	Built in 1926.

== Demographics ==
As of 2017, 4,337 people live in Rockwood across 1,855 households. Of those households, 25.8% are rented, well below the citywide average of 45.3%. 31.5% of residents are age 19 or younger while 19.1% are aged 65 or above. The median household income is $87,201, nearly double the citywide figure of $44,768. Residents with a bachelor's degree or higher account for 67.5% of Rockwood residents while those with a high school diploma or less account for 8.2%. 92.4% of residents were born in the United States or one of its territories. Among foreign-born residents, Canada accounts for the most at 25.6%, followed by the Philippines at 11%, Ukraine at 9.8% and Hungary at 7.6%.

== Education ==
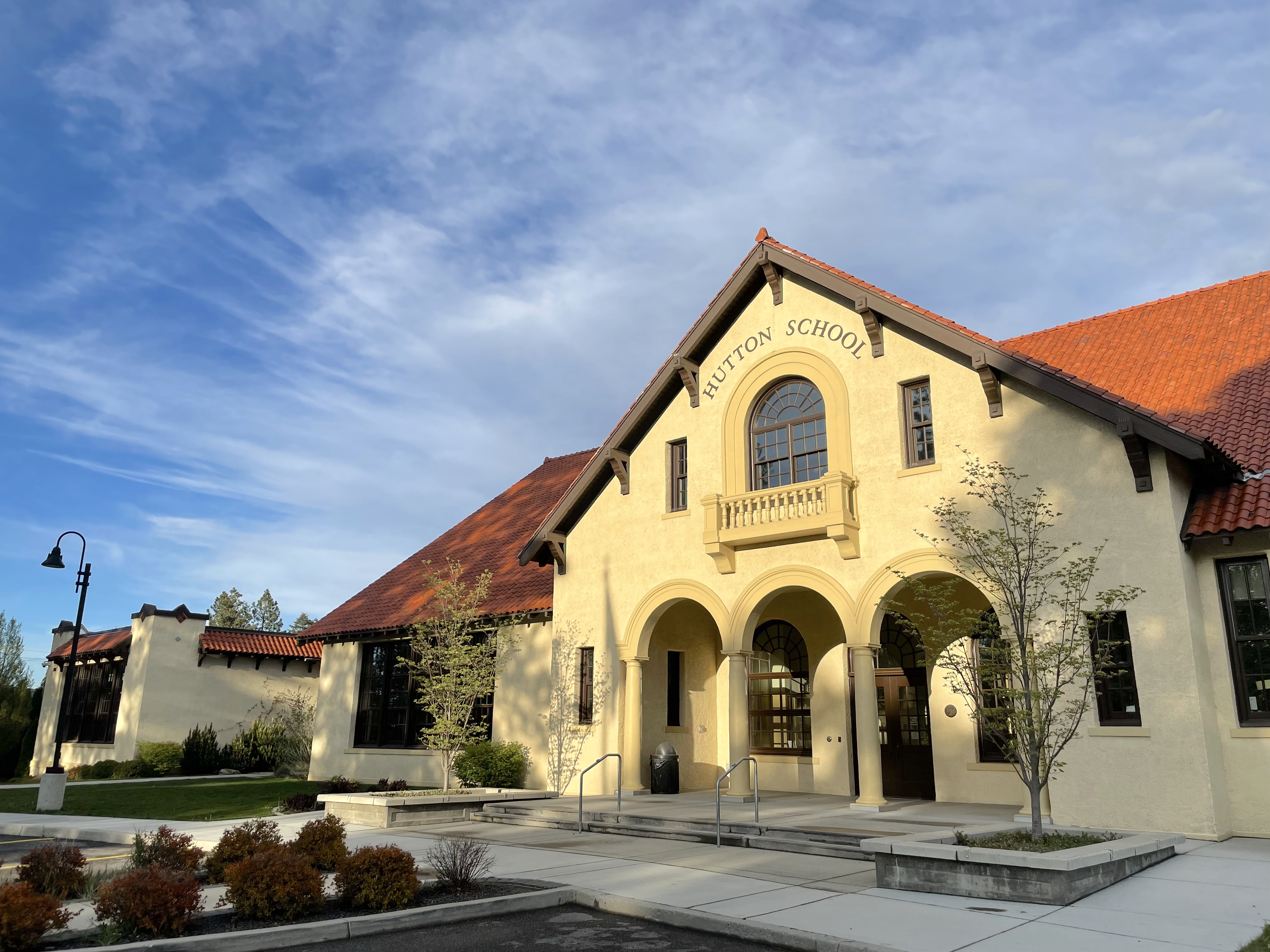
Hutton Elementary School

Rockwood is home to Hutton Elementary School, a public school in the Spokane Public Schools district. Hutton serves most of the neighborhood, though not all. In the northwest, 19th Avenue, Latawah Street and 17th Avenue separate the Hutton district from that of Roosevelt Elementary School, located in the adjacent Cliff/Cannon neighborhood. The areas north of 17th Avenue and east of Rockwood Boulevard are part of the Grant Elementary School district, located in the adjacent South Perry District.

Hutton, Roosevelt and Grant Elementaries all feed into Sacajawea Middle School, located in the adjacent Comstock neighborhood, which then feeds into Lewis and Clark High School in the adjacent Cliff/Cannon neighborhood.

== Transportation ==
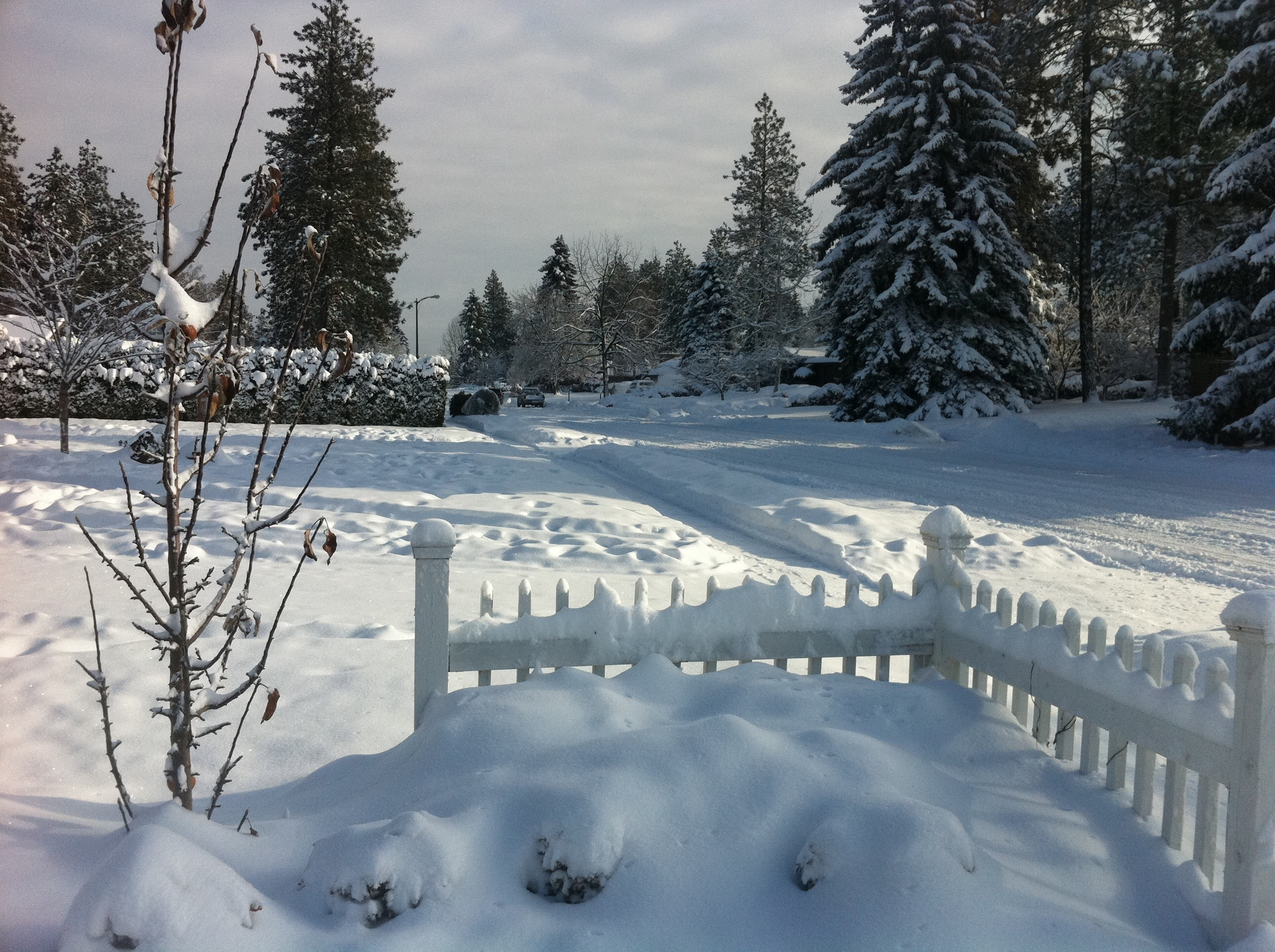
Rockwood Boulevard in winter

=== Surface Streets ===
Grand Boulevard and 29th Avenue are considered urban principle arterials, the highest classification in the city for non-limited access roadways. Southeast Boulevard is classified as an urban minor arterial. Rockwood Boulevard is classified as a major urban collector, a level between arterials and local access roads.

Bicycle routes run along Southeast Boulevard, which has a dedicated bike lane. A shared roadway bicycle route runs from Rockwood's southern boundary at Arthur Street south to Plateau Road, Garfield Road and Upper Terrace Road.

=== Public Transit ===
The Spokane Transit Authority, the region's public transportation provider, serves Rockwood with seven fixed schedule bus lines.

Route	Termini			Service operation and notes	Streets traveled
4; Moran Prairie	Downtown Spokane; STA Plaza	↔	Glenrose; Moran Station Park & Ride	High-frequency route	Grand Boulevard, 29th Avenue
45; Perry District	Downtown Spokane; STA Plaza	↔	Lincoln Heights; South Hill Park & Ride	Basic-frequency route	Southeast Boulevard

Both routes passing through Rockwood serve the South Hill Park and Ride center, which is located two blocks south of Rockwood's southeasternmost point. Route 12, the Southside Medical Shuttle, has a stop across the street from Rockwood's northernmost point, but does not pass through the neighborhood directly.
