= Rockwood Park =

Rockwood Park may refer to different places:

- Rockwood Park, Queens, a neighborhood in the New York City borough of Queens
- Rockwood Park, Saint John, a city park located in Saint John, New Brunswick
- Rockwood Museum and Park, a 72-acre (290,000 m^{2}) park located in Wilmington, Delaware, with the Rockwood Museum (a Victorian mansion) and a historic garden
