= Spokane Public Library (disambiguation) =

Spokane Public Library may refer to:

- Spokane Public Library, the public library system of Spokane, Washington
- Spokane Public Library - North Monroe Branch, 925 W. Montgomery St., listed on the National Register of Historic Places in Spokane County, Washington
- Spokane Public Library - Heath Branch, 525 Mission St., listed on the National Register of Historic Places in Spokane County, Washington
- Spokane Public Library - East Side Branch, 25 Altamont St., listed on the National Register of Historic Places in Spokane County, Washington
- Spokane Public Library - Main, 10 S. Cedar, Spokane, Washington, listed on the National Register of Historic Places in Spokane County, Washington
