= National Register of Historic Places listings in Spokane County, Washington =

Location of Spokane County in Washington

This is a list of the National Register of Historic Places listings in Spokane County, Washington.

This is intended to be a complete list of the properties and districts on the National Register of Historic Places in Spokane County, Washington, United States. Latitude and longitude coordinates are provided for many National Register properties and districts; these locations may be seen together in an online map.

There are 160 properties and districts listed on the National Register in the county. 136 of these properties and districts are located within the city of Spokane, while the remaining 24 properties and districts are located elsewhere. Another 2 properties were once listed but have been removed.

This National Park Service list is complete through NPS recent listings posted November 6, 2026.

== Listings (exclusive of Spokane) ==
	Name on the Register	Image	Date listed	Location	City or town	Description
1	American Firebrick Company	American Firebrick Company	March 9, 1982 (#82004289)	WA 27; 47°33′33″N 117°12′31″W	Mica	
2	American Legion Cenotaph – Riverside Park Cemetery	American Legion Cenotaph – Riverside Park Cemetery	May 23, 2024 (#100010340)	508 N Government Way; 47°39′39″N 117°27′57″W	Spokane vicinity	
3	California Ranch	California Ranch	August 11, 1980 (#80004010)	E of Mica on Jackson and Belmont Rds. 47°33′29″N 117°11′38″W	Mica	
4	Central Schoolhouse (District No. 49)	Central Schoolhouse (District No. 49)	August 27, 1992 (#92001040)	Jct. of Ritchey and Four Mound Rds., NW corner 47°47′19″N 117°42′49″W	Nine Mile Falls	Rural Public Schools of Washington State MPS
5	Cheney Interurban Depot	Cheney Interurban Depot	March 26, 1979 (#79002555)	505 2nd St. 47°29′17″N 117°34′32″W	Cheney	
6	Cheney Odd Fellows Hall	Cheney Odd Fellows Hall	October 25, 1990 (#90001639)	321 First St. 47°29′12″N 117°34′33″W	Cheney	
7	City of Cheney Historic District	City of Cheney Historic District	February 2, 2001 (#01000062)	Roughly bounded by Fifth St., C St., Front St., and F St. 47°29′18″N 117°34′35″W	Cheney	
8	Dybdall Gristmill		January 11, 1976 (#76001913)	10 mi. S of Cheney at Chapman Lake; 47°21′13″N 117°33′56″W	Cheney	
9	Hallett House	Hallett House	June 17, 1976 (#76001915)	E. 623 Lake, SE; 47°34′24″N 117°40′25″W	Medical Lake	
10	Ham-McEachern House	Ham-McEachern House	February 8, 1978 (#78002774)	Pine and 5th Sts. 47°16′59″N 117°09′24″W	Latah	
11	Italian Rock Ovens		September 29, 1976 (#76001914)	S of Cheney; 47°26′58″N 117°35′39″W	Cheney	
12	Latah School	Latah School	December 4, 2002 (#02001489)	515 North Main; 47°17′01″N 117°09′19″W	Latah	Rural Public Schools of Washington State MPS
13	David Lowe House	David Lowe House	October 13, 1983 (#83004264)	306 F St. 47°29′16″N 117°34′41″W	Cheney	
14	Marshall Bridge	Marshall Bridge	May 24, 1995 (#95000631)	Cheney-Spokane Rd. over the SP & S Railroad tracks 47°34′00″N 117°29′36″W	Marshall	Bridges of Washington State MPS
15	Millwood Historic District	Millwood Historic District	February 2, 2001 (#01000064)	Roughly bounded by Argonne and Sargent Rds., and by Euclid and Liberty Aves. 47°41′14″N 117°17′05″W	Millwood	
16	Mount Spokane Vista House	Mount Spokane Vista House	December 7, 2018 (#100003229)	N 26107 Mt. Spokane Park Dr. 47°55′26″N 117°06′44″W	Mead	
17	Nine Mile Hydroelectric Power Plant Historic District	Nine Mile Hydroelectric Power Plant Historic District	December 6, 1990 (#90001861)	Charles Rd. at Spokane R. 47°46′32″N 117°32′40″W	Nine Mile Falls	
18	Opportunity Township Hall	Opportunity Township Hall	March 15, 2005 (#05000190)	12114 E. Sprague Ave. 47°39′26″N 117°14′27″W	Spokane Valley	
19	Roosevelt Hall	Roosevelt Hall	September 8, 1997 (#97001084)	Eastern Washington Hospital; 47°34′18″N 117°41′46″W	Medical Lake	
20	Sutton Barn	Sutton Barn	November 20, 1975 (#75001871)	0.5 mi. SW of Cheney off U.S. 395; 47°29′09″N 117°35′18″W	Cheney	
21	Turnbull Pines Rock Shelter		May 6, 1975 (#75001872)	Address Restricted	Cheney	
22	Upper Kepple Rockshelters (45SP7)		July 26, 1985 (#85001640)	Address Restricted	Cheney	
23	Washington State Normal School at Cheney Historic District	Washington State Normal School at Cheney Historic District	October 1, 1992 (#92001287)	Jct. of Fifth and C Sts. 47°29′26″N 117°34′47″W	Cheney	
24	West Valley High School	West Valley High School	November 21, 1991 (#91001736)	N. 2805 Argonne Rd. 47°40′53″N 117°17′03″W	Millwood	Rural Public Schools of Washington State MPS. Demolished early 1990s.

== Spokane ==
	Name on the Register	Image	Date listed	Location	Description
1	Amman	Amman	February 12, 1987 (#87000086)	W. 1516 Riverside; 47°39′25″N 117°26′01″W	Built in 1904.
2	Louise Chandler Anderson House	Louise Chandler Anderson House	December 30, 2013 (#13001030)	3003 S. Manito Blvd. 47°37′37″N 117°24′25″W	
3	Alonzo and Louise Barnett House	Alonzo and Louise Barnett House	August 21, 2003 (#03000809)	902 W. Augusta Ave. 47°40′24″N 117°25′41″W	Built in 1903.
4	Harvey and Mary Bauer House	Harvey and Mary Bauer House	December 31, 2013 (#13001031)	420 W. 22nd St. 47°38′05″N 117°25′03″W	
5	Dr. Robert and Jessie Bell House	Dr. Robert and Jessie Bell House	August 24, 2005 (#05000921)	917 S. Lincoln St. 47°38′57″N 117°25′27″W	Built in 1908.
6	Benewah Milk Bottle	Benewah Milk Bottle	August 13, 1986 (#86001521)	S. 321 Cedar; 47°39′11″N 117°25′53″W	Built in 1935.
7	J. W. Binkley House	J. W. Binkley House	March 31, 1989 (#89000211)	628 S. Maple; 47°39′01″N 117°26′06″W	
8	Harry and Catherine Bleeker House	Harry and Catherine Bleeker House	December 23, 2019 (#100004787)	1707 North West Point Rd. 47°40′22″N 117°26′45″W	
9	Breslin	Breslin	February 12, 1987 (#87000095)	S. 729 Bernard; 47°38′56″N 117°24′54″W	Built in 1910.
10	Kenneth and Edna Brooks House	Kenneth and Edna Brooks House	September 15, 2004 (#04001006)	723 W. Sumner Ave. 47°38′48″N 117°25′15″W	Built in 1956.
11	Browne's Addition Historic District	Browne's Addition Historic District	July 30, 1976 (#76001916)	Roughly bounded by Sunset Blvd., Maple, Latah Creek, and Spokane River; 47°39′19″N 117°26′30″W	Roughly bounded by Sunset Blvd., Maple, Latah Creek, and Spokane River
12	Bump Block-Bellevue House-Hawthorne Hotel	Bump Block-Bellevue House-Hawthorne Hotel	August 10, 2000 (#00000977)	S 206 Post St. 47°39′16″N 117°25′22″W	Built in 1890.
13	Cambern Dutch Shop Windmill	Cambern Dutch Shop Windmill	March 16, 1989 (#89000213)	S. 1102 Perry; 47°38′43″N 117°23′20″W	Built circa 1929.
14	Campbell House	Campbell House	May 31, 1974 (#74001979)	W. 2316 1st Ave. 47°39′25″N 117°26′45″W	Built in 1898, this house is now part of the Northwest Museum of Arts and Culture.
15	George and Nellie Canfield House	George and Nellie Canfield House	December 29, 2014 (#14001109)	1301 N. Sherwood St. 47°40′08″N 117°27′23″W	
16	Central Steam Heat Plant	Central Steam Heat Plant	December 13, 1996 (#96001492)	152 S. Post St. and 815 W. Railroad Ave. 47°39′20″N 117°25′23″W	Built in 1916.
17	George and Blanche Christiansen House	George and Blanche Christiansen House	December 8, 2015 (#15000881)	1329 E. Overbluff Rd. 47°38′09″N 117°23′25″W	
18	City Ramp Garage	City Ramp Garage	December 26, 2012 (#12001099)	430 W. 1st Ave. 47°39′24″N 117°25′10″W	
19	Patsy Clark Mansion	Patsy Clark Mansion	October 31, 1975 (#75001873)	W. 2208 2nd Ave. 47°39′19″N 117°26′39″W	
20	Coeur d'Alene Park	Coeur d'Alene Park	December 12, 2018 (#100003228)	2111 W 2nd Ave. 47°39′13″N 117°26′41″W	
21	Columbia Building	Columbia Building	February 3, 2020 (#100004960)	107 South Howard St. 47°39′23″N 117°25′16″W	
22	Clemmer Theater	Clemmer Theater	December 1, 1988 (#88002758)	W. 901 Sprague Ave. 47°39′26″N 117°25′26″W	Built circa 1915; also known as the Bing Crosby Theater
23	Commercial Block	Commercial Block	October 15, 1993 (#93001103)	1111-1119 First Ave. W. 47°39′24″N 117°25′39″W	Built in 1906.
24	Coolidge-Rising House	Coolidge-Rising House	May 19, 1988 (#88000598)	W. 1405 Ninth Ave. 47°38′50″N 117°25′54″W	Built circa 1906.
25	Corbet-Aspray House	Corbet-Aspray House	November 30, 1999 (#99001454)	820 W. 7th Ave. 47°38′59″N 117°25′22″W	Built in 1908.
26	Corbin Park Historic District	Corbin Park Historic District	November 12, 1992 (#92001584)	Waverly Pl. (W205-733), Park Pl. (W203-738), W. Oval and E. Oval; 47°41′06″N 117°25′03″W	
27	Daniel C. and Anna Corbin House	Daniel C. and Anna Corbin House	May 10, 2004 (#04000157)	507 W. Seventh Ave. 47°39′02″N 117°25′11″W	Built in 1898.
28	Courthouse and Federal Office Building	Courthouse and Federal Office Building	September 30, 2024 (#100010892)	920 W. Riverside Avenue; 47°39′30″N 117°25′34″W	
29	Cowley Park	Cowley Park	February 6, 1973 (#73001891)	S. Division St. between 6th and 7th Aves. 47°38′58″N 117°24′39″W	Built in 1917
30	The Davenport Hotel	The Davenport Hotel	September 5, 1975 (#75001874)	807 W. Sprague; 47°39′26″N 117°25′23″W	Built in 1914.
31	Desmet Avenue Warehouse Historic District	Desmet Avenue Warehouse Historic District	May 27, 1997 (#97000450)	Roughly, N side of Desmet Ave., from Pearl St. to US 395-2; 47°40′04″N 117°24′30″W	
32	Dodd House	Dodd House	July 3, 2010 (#10000417)	603 S. Arthur St. 47°39′03″N 117°23′41″W	
33	Dodson Building	Dodson Building	January 29, 2021 (#100006068)	218-220 North Bernard St. 47°39′35″N 117°24′58″W	
34	East Downtown Historic District	East Downtown Historic District	August 29, 2003 (#03000860)	Roughly bounded by Main Ave., Second Ave., Division St., and Post St. 47°39′24″N 117°25′05″W	
35	Gus and Florence Ehrenberg House	Gus and Florence Ehrenberg House	August 16, 2007 (#07000832)	1304 S. Cook St. 47°38′43″N 117°22′25″W	Built in 1911.
36	Eldridge Building	Eldridge Building	November 12, 1992 (#92001588)	1319-1325 W. First Ave. 47°39′24″N 117°25′51″W	Built circa 1925.
37	Empire State Building	Empire State Building	August 18, 1977 (#77001361)	W. 901 Riverside St. 47°39′28″N 117°25′27″W	Built circa 1900, this is also known as the Great Western Building.
38	Fairmont Hotel	Fairmont Hotel	September 18, 2001 (#01001204)	315 W. Riverside Ave., 314 W. Sprague Ave. 47°39′27″N 117°25′00″W	
39	Felts Field Historic District	Felts Field Historic District	September 24, 1991 (#91001442)	Roughly, Rutter Ave. between Fancher and Dollar Rds. 47°40′50″N 117°19′15″W	
40	Finch House	Finch House	July 12, 1976 (#76001917)	W. 2340 1st Ave., S. 104 Poplar; 47°39′27″N 117°26′48″W	Built circa 1897, this home was designed by Kirtland Cutter & Karl G. Malmgren of Cutter & Malmgren.
41	John A. Finch Memorial Nurses Home	John A. Finch Memorial Nurses Home	May 28, 1991 (#91000631)	N. 852 Summit Blvd. 47°39′57″N 117°27′16″W	Built in 1929.
42	John A. Finch School	John A. Finch School	January 8, 2014 (#13001061)	3717 N. Milton St. 47°41′32″N 117°27′10″W	
43	First Congregational Church of Spokane	First Congregational Church of Spokane	April 26, 1978 (#78002775)	W. 311-329 4th Ave. 47°39′08″N 117°24′59″W	Built in 1890.
44	Five Mile Prairie School	Five Mile Prairie School	September 9, 2004 (#04000952)	8621 N. Five Mile Rd. 47°44′19″N 117°27′16″W	Built in 1939. Rural Public Schools of Washington State MPS
45	Fort George Wright Historic District	Fort George Wright Historic District	May 17, 1976 (#76001918)	W. 4000 Randolph Rd. 47°40′42″N 117°28′27″W	Founded in 1897.
46	Fox Theater	Fox Theater	November 30, 2001 (#01001287)	1005 W. Sprague Ave. 47°39′25″N 117°25′34″W	Built in 1931, this theater was remodeled and renamed the Martin Woldson Theater at the Fox in 2007.
47	Franklin Elementary School	Franklin Elementary School	May 1, 2017 (#100000946)	2627 E. 17th Ave. 47°38′26″N 117°22′17″W	
48	Frequency Changing Station	Frequency Changing Station	June 19, 1979 (#79002556)	E. 1420 Celesta Ave. 47°39′06″N 117°23′14″W	Built in 1908.
49	W. P. Fuller and Company Warehouse	W. P. Fuller and Company Warehouse	January 11, 1996 (#95001529)	E. 111 and E. 115 Desmet; 47°40′03″N 117°24′27″W	Built circa 1915.
50	Garland Theater	Garland Theater	December 24, 2013 (#13000999)	924 W. Garland Ave. 47°41′38″N 117°25′32″W	Part of the Movie Theaters in Washington State MPS
51	Germond Block	Germond Block	January 8, 2014 (#13001062)	830 W. Sprague Ave. 47°39′27″N 117°25′29″W	
52	The Globe Hotel	The Globe Hotel	December 17, 1998 (#97001080)	204 N. Division St. 47°39′34″N 117°24′35″W	Built in 1908.
53	Glover House	Glover House	August 14, 1973 (#73001892)	W. 321 8th Ave. 47°38′54″N 117°24′57″W	Built circa 1888, this home was designed by Kirtland Cutter.
54	Grace Baptist Church	Grace Baptist Church	October 2, 1992 (#92001289)	1527 W. Mallon St. 47°39′55″N 117°26′03″W	Built in 1908.
55	Hill–Hilscher House	Hill–Hilscher House	January 8, 2014 (#13001063)	1638 S. Cedar St. 47°38′22″N 117°25′58″W	
56	Hillyard High School	Hillyard High School	August 24, 2005 (#05000920)	5313 N. Regal St. 47°42′23″N 117°22′04″W	Built in 1912, the building was converted to apartments in the 1940s.
57	Hillyard Historic Business District	Hillyard Historic Business District	August 9, 2002 (#02000860)	N. 4912-5220 Market St., E. 3108-3117 Olympic Ave. 47°42′15″N 117°21′49″W	
58	Holley-Mason Building	Holley-Mason Building	October 13, 1983 (#83004262)	S. 157 Howard; 47°39′19″N 117°25′12″W	Built circa 1905.
59	Holy Names Academy Building	Holy Names Academy Building	May 2, 1986 (#86000959)	1216 N. Superior St. 47°40′08″N 117°23′28″W	Built in 1891.
60	Hotel Collins	Hotel Collins	May 19, 2025 (#100011857)	701-705-1/2 West Second Avenue (202-212 South Wall Street); 47°39′16″N 117°25′21″W	
61	Hotel Upton	Hotel Upton	July 29, 1994 (#94000798)	S. 106 Cedar St. 47°38′52″N 117°25′54″W	Built in 1910, this is also known as the Grand Coulee Building.
62	Hutton Building	Hutton Building	January 27, 1983 (#83004037)	9 S. Washington St. 47°39′25″N 117°25′00″W	Built circa 1907.
63	Hutton Settlement	Hutton Settlement	January 1, 1976 (#76001919)	9907 Wellesley; 47°42′00″N 117°15′53″W	
64	Levi and May Arkwright Hutton House	Levi and May Arkwright Hutton House	February 21, 2002 (#02000088)	2206 E. 17th Ave. 47°38′24″N 117°22′40″W	Built in 1914, this was the home of May Arkwright. Street direction is wrong on coversheet.
65	Kemp & Hebert Building	Kemp & Hebert Building	July 1, 1994 (#94000660)	404 W. Main Ave. 47°39′35″N 117°25′03″W	Built in 1908.
66	Kiesow-Gentsch House	Kiesow-Gentsch House	January 7, 2015 (#14001144)	618 W. 23rd Ave. 47°38′02″N 117°25′17″W	
67	Knickerbocker	Knickerbocker	February 12, 1987 (#87000096)	S. 501-507 Howard; 47°39′05″N 117°25′10″W	Built in 1912.
68	Knight House	Knight House	November 30, 1999 (#99001459)	1715 N. West Point Rd. 47°40′28″N 117°26′41″W	Built in 1910.
69	Koerner House	Koerner House	July 28, 1999 (#99000915)	1824 S. Mount Vernon St. 47°38′20″N 117°22′11″W	Built in 1912.
70	Levesque-Majer House	Levesque-Majer House	January 14, 2015 (#14001162)	1708 S. Maple Blvd. 47°38′20″N 117°26′03″W	
71	Lewis and Clark High School	Lewis and Clark High School	December 6, 1990 (#90001860)	W. 521 4th Ave. 47°39′08″N 117°25′09″W	
72	Littlebrook	Littlebrook	July 26, 1996 (#96000840)	16704 N. Dartford Dr. 47°48′36″N 117°24′29″W	Built in 1905.
73	Manito Park and Boulevard	Manito Park and Boulevard	December 15, 2015 (#15000909)	1702 S. Grand Blvd. 47°38′07″N 117°24′30″W	
74	Marycliff-Cliff Park Historic District	Marycliff-Cliff Park Historic District	December 21, 1979 (#79002557)	Roughly bounded by Lincoln St., 7th, 12th, and 14th Aves. 47°38′46″N 117°25′06″W	
75	McKinley School	McKinley School	December 7, 2018 (#100003257)	117 N Napa St. 47°39′31″N 117°22′53″W	
76	McMillen-Dyar House	McMillen-Dyar House	August 26, 2019 (#100004330)	526 E 12th Ave. 47°38′39″N 117°24′11″W	
77	Gustav Meese Building	Gustav Meese Building	February 16, 1996 (#96000049)	1727 Sinto Ave. 47°40′11″N 117°26′13″W	
78	Miller Block	Miller Block	May 4, 1998 (#98000370)	808 W. Sprague Ave. 47°39′28″N 117°25′22″W	Built circa 1890.
79	Mission Avenue Historic District	Mission Avenue Historic District	August 14, 1986 (#86002644)	E. 220-824 Mission Ave. 47°40′19″N 117°24′04″W	
80	Dr. Hans & Rosaleen Moldenhauer House	Dr. Hans & Rosaleen Moldenhauer House	June 4, 2024 (#100010388)	808 S. Lincoln St. 47°38′53″N 117°25′29″W	
81	Monroe Street Bridge	Monroe Street Bridge	May 13, 1976 (#76001920)	Monroe St. between Ide Ave. and Riverfalls Blvd. 47°39′40″N 117°25′32″W	Built in 1911, this bridge had the longest concrete span in the US when it was built. Historic Bridges and Tunnels in Washington TR
82	Montvale Block	Montvale Block	April 13, 1998 (#98000369)	1001-1009 W. First Ave. 47°39′24″N 117°25′31″W	Built in 1899 and also known as the Montvale Hotel, the building was renovated and reopened in 2005, after 25 years of vacancy.
83	Mount Saint Michael	Mount Saint Michael	May 5, 2000 (#00000456)	8500 N. Saint Michael Rd. 47°43′55″N 117°20′21″W	Built in 1916.
84	Muzzy-Shine House	Muzzy-Shine House	December 20, 2010 (#10001045)	1506 W. Mission Ave. 47°40′19″N 117°26′04″W	
85	Natatorium Carousel	Natatorium Carousel	September 19, 1977 (#77001362)	Spokane Falls Blvd. 47°39′39″N 117°25′10″W	Built circa 1909 and also known as the Natatorium Carousel, this carousel was designed by Charles I. D. Looff and moved from Natatorium Park to its current site at Riverfront Park in 1975.
86	Nettleton's Addition Historic District	Nettleton's Addition Historic District	March 22, 2006 (#06000176)	Area bounded by W. Summit, Mission, N Summit, A St. Bridge, and Chestnut; 47°40′08″N 117°26′34″W	Established in 1887.
87	Ninth Avenue Historic District	Ninth Avenue Historic District	July 21, 1994 (#94000679)	Roughly bounded by 7th Ave., Monroe St., 12th Ave. and the Burlington Northern RR tracks 47°38′51″N 117°26′02″W	
88	Otis Hotel	Otis Hotel	October 2, 1998 (#98001227)	1101-1109 W. First; 47°39′24″N 117°25′38″W	Built in 1911.
89	Eben and Cynthia Palmer Farmstead	Eben and Cynthia Palmer Farmstead	January 14, 2015 (#14001163)	6616 E. Orchard Rd. 47°44′18″N 117°18′55″W	
90	Parkade	Parkade	December 29, 2025 (#100012444)	511 W Main Avenue; 47°39′32″N 117°25′13″W	
91	Peaceful Valley Historic District	Peaceful Valley Historic District	April 19, 1984 (#84003617)	Roughly bounded by the Spokane River, Wilson Ave., Elm, and Cedar Sts. 47°39′32″N 117°26′03″W	
92	Peyton Building and Peyton Annex	Peyton Building and Peyton Annex	March 15, 2005 (#05000191)	722 W. Sprague Ave./10 N. Post St. 47°39′34″N 117°25′24″W	Built in 1898 and 1908.
93	John F. “Jack” and Barbara E. Phillips House		November 2, 2026 (#100013562)	611 S Montavilla Drive; 47°38′59″N 117°27′55″W	
94	Victor & Jean Piollet House	Victor & Jean Piollet House	December 13, 2010 (#10001019)	606 W. 16th Ave. 47°38′28″N 117°25′15″W	
95	John and Mary Ralston House	John and Mary Ralston House	December 3, 2002 (#02001488)	2421 W. Mission Ave. 47°40′17″N 117°26′53″W	Built in 1900.
96	Review Building	Review Building	February 24, 1975 (#75001875)	SE corner, Riverside Ave. and Monroe St. 47°39′28″N 117°25′31″W	Built in 1890.
97	Royal Riblet House	Royal Riblet House	March 26, 1979 (#79002558)	East of Spokane on Fruit Hill Rd. 47°41′52″N 117°14′57″W	Built in 1925.
98	Richardson-Jackson House	Richardson-Jackson House	March 22, 2006 (#06000178)	1226 N. Summit Blvd. 47°40′13″N 117°27′29″W	Built in 1906.
99	Ridpath Hotel	Ridpath Hotel	December 24, 2013 (#13001000)	515 W. Sprague Ave. 47°39′25″N 117°25′13″W	
100	Riverside Avenue Historic District	Riverside Avenue Historic District	July 30, 1976 (#76001921)	Riverside Ave. 47°39′27″N 117°25′44″W	
101	Robinwood Apartments	Robinwood Apartments	March 30, 2005 (#05000248)	209-223 West Ninth Ave. 47°38′57″N 117°24′54″W	Built in 1939.
102	Rockwood Historic District	Rockwood Historic District	April 14, 1997 (#97000320)	Roughly, Rockwood Blvd. from 11th to 29th Aves. 47°38′12″N 117°23′56″W	
103	John R. Rogers High School	John R. Rogers High School	December 29, 2010 (#10001104)	1622 E. Wellesley Ave. 47°47′58″N 117°23′09″W	
104	Roosevelt Apartments	Roosevelt Apartments	August 10, 2000 (#00000969)	524 W. Seventh Ave. 47°38′59″N 117°24′59″W	Built in 1929.
105	Rosebush House	Rosebush House	November 22, 2000 (#00001446)	3318 N. Marguerite Rd. 47°41′15″N 117°17′02″W	
106	Salvation Army Building	Salvation Army Building	November 22, 2000 (#00001445)	245 W. Main Ave. 47°39′32″N 117°24′53″W	Built in 1921.
107	San Marco	San Marco	February 12, 1987 (#87000090)	W. 1229 Riverside; 47°39′27″N 117°25′48″W	Built in 1904.
108	Schade Brewery	Schade Brewery	December 8, 1994 (#94001441)	E. 528 Trent Ave. 47°39′40″N 117°24′05″W	Originally built 1902-03, additional construction was in 1907 and 1934–1937.
109	Sears, Roebuck Department Store	Sears, Roebuck Department Store	June 4, 1991 (#91000629)	W. 902 Main Ave. 47°39′34″N 117°25′28″W	Built in 1929 and also known as the Comstock Library, this art deco building was demolished in 1992.
110	Seehorn-Lang Building	Seehorn-Lang Building	January 23, 1998 (#97001674)	151-165 S. Lincoln St. 47°39′20″N 117°25′25″W	
111	William O. and Stella M. Seligman House	William O. and Stella M. Seligman House	December 16, 2014 (#14001054)	2203 S. Manito Blvd. 47°38′03″N 117°24′27″W	
112	Edwin A. Smith House	Edwin A. Smith House	August 23, 1985 (#85001808)	N. 1414 Summit Blvd. 47°40′14″N 117°27′19″W	Built circa 1912.
113	William and Margaret Solby House	William and Margaret Solby House	August 16, 2007 (#07000831)	1325 E. 20th Ave. 47°38′20″N 117°23′25″W	Built in 1926.
114	Spokane City Hall Building	Spokane City Hall Building	February 21, 1985 (#85000350)	N. 221 Wall St. and W. 711 Spokane Falls Blvd. 47°39′35″N 117°25′18″W	Built 1912-13, this was planned to be a "temporary" city hall, but functioned in this capacity for 70 years.
115	Spokane Club Building-Legion Building	Spokane Club Building-Legion Building	August 8, 1994 (#94000800)	108 N. Washington St. 47°39′30″N 117°25′00″W	Built in 1901 and designed by John K. Dow.
116	Spokane County Courthouse	Spokane County Courthouse	January 21, 1974 (#74001980)	W. 1116 Broadway; 47°39′54″N 117°25′40″W	Built 1894-95 and designed by Willis Ritchie.
117	Spokane Fire Station No. 3	Spokane Fire Station No. 3	December 9, 1994 (#94001439)	1229 N. Monroe St. 47°40′09″N 117°25′33″W	
118	Spokane Flour Mill	Spokane Flour Mill	February 8, 1978 (#78002778)	W. 621 Mallon Ave. 47°39′45″N 117°25′13″W	Built in 1895, but did not begin operation until 1900 due to legal issues.
119	Spokane & Inland Empire Railroad Car Facility	Spokane & Inland Empire Railroad Car Facility	September 10, 2010 (#10000749)	800 E. Spokane Falls Blvd. 47°39′42″N 117°23′52″W	
120	Spokane Public Library	Spokane Public Library	August 3, 1982 (#82004292)	925 W. Montgomery St. 47°40′42″N 117°25′31″W	Carnegie Libraries of Washington TR
121	Spokane Public Library	Spokane Public Library	August 3, 1982 (#82004291)	525 Mission St. 47°40′20″N 117°24′02″W	Built circa 1913. Carnegie Libraries of Washington; Included in the Mission Avenue Historic District.
122	Spokane Public Library	Spokane Public Library	August 3, 1982 (#82004290)	25 Altamont St. 47°39′24″N 117°22′26″W	Carnegie Libraries of Washington TR
123	Spokane Public Library	Spokane Public Library	August 3, 1982 (#82004910)	10 S. Cedar; 47°39′25″N 117°25′54″W	Carnegie Libraries of Washington TR; Included in the Riverside Avenue Historic District.
124	Spokane Sash and Door Company Flats	Spokane Sash and Door Company Flats	August 24, 2005 (#05000924)	1302-1312 W Broadway Ave. 47°40′00″N 117°25′52″W	Built in 1909 and designed by Kirtland Cutter.
125	Sunset Boulevard Bridge	Sunset Boulevard Bridge	July 16, 1982 (#82004293)	Spans Latah Creek; 47°39′00″N 117°26′48″W	Built 1911-14. Historic Bridges and Tunnels in Washington TR
126	Dr. Charles and Elsie Thomas House	Dr. Charles and Elsie Thomas House	August 15, 2007 (#07000834)	1212 N. Summit Blvd. 47°40′12″N 117°27′28″W	Built in 1907.
127	Frank and Maude Tuell House	Frank and Maude Tuell House	August 9, 2006 (#06000702)	416 W. 22nd Ave. 47°38′12″N 117°25′03″W	
128	Luther P. and Jane Marie Turner House	Luther P. and Jane Marie Turner House	December 23, 2003 (#03001343)	E. 1521 Illinois Ave; 47°40′47″N 117°22′20″W	Built in 1916.
129	US Post Office, Courthouse, and Custom House	US Post Office, Courthouse, and Custom House	December 8, 1983 (#83004269)	904 W. Riverside Ave. 47°39′30″N 117°25′31″W	
130	William and Ella Warner House	William and Ella Warner House	December 23, 2019 (#100004788)	2627 South Manito Blvd. 47°37′48″N 117°24′26″W	
131	Washington Street Bridge	Washington Street Bridge	July 16, 1982 (#82004294)	Spanned Spokane River; 47°39′48″N 117°25′01″W	Built in 1908, this bridge was the oldest of its type in Washington when it was demolished in 1983.
132	Lawrence and Lydia Weaver House	Lawrence and Lydia Weaver House	March 13, 2002 (#02000186)	520 W. 16th Ave. 47°38′29″N 117°25′07″W	Built in 1910.
133	West Downtown Historic Transportation Corridor	West Downtown Historic Transportation Corridor	December 30, 1999 (#99001631)	Roughly bounded 2nd Ave., Maple St., Sprague Ave., and Howard St. 47°39′22″N 117°25′40″W	
134	Whitten Block	Whitten Block	May 14, 1993 (#93000362)	N. 1 Post St. 47°39′28″N 117°25′22″W	Built 1889-90, it is also known as Hamer's, currently houses the Hotel Lusso.
135	Ralston and Sarah Wilbur House	Ralston and Sarah Wilbur House	March 15, 2006 (#06000136)	2525 E. 19th Ave. 47°38′26″N 117°22′18″W	Built in 1916.
136	James and Corinne Williams House	James and Corinne Williams House	December 23, 2003 (#03001344)	1225 W. 19th Ave. 47°38′16″N 117°25′44″W	Built in 1911.

== Former listings ==
	Name on the Register	Image	Date listed	Date removed	Location	City or town	Description
1	Hyde Building and Annex		February 8, 1978 (#78002776)	January 20, 1988	Formerly at 611½ Riverside Ave.	Spokane	Built in 1890, this building was demolished in 1979.
2	Strahorn Pines		July 25, 1974 (#74002298)	1974	Formerly at W. 2216 1st Ave.	Spokane	Built in 1904, and designed by Kirtland Cutter, this home was demolished in 1974.

== See also ==
- List of National Historic Landmarks in Washington (state)
- National Register of Historic Places listings in Washington state
