= Spokane Public Library =

Public library system in Washington

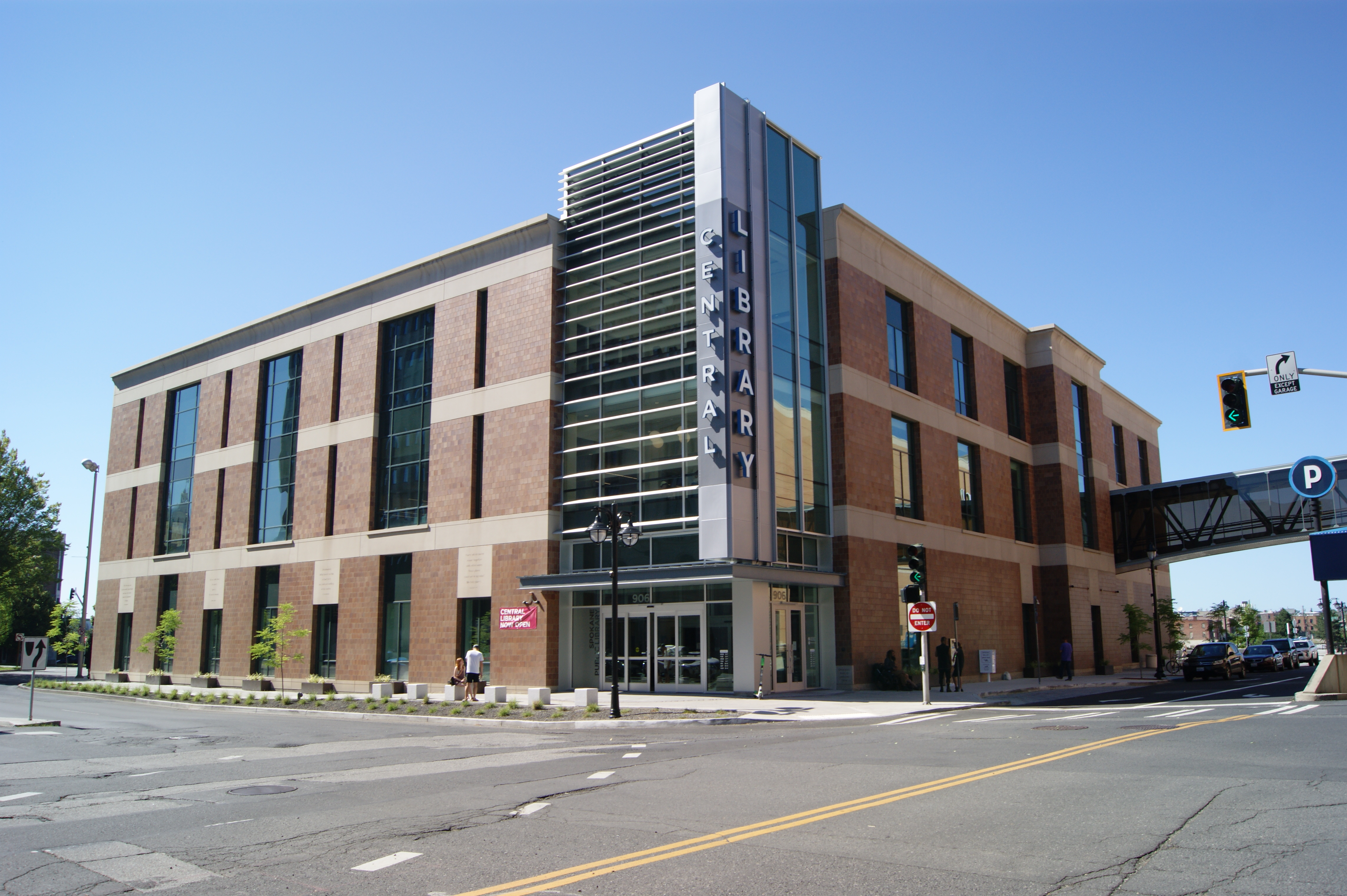
- Spokane Public Library Central branch
- 47°39′34″N 117°25′32″W
- Location: Spokane, Washington, US
- Type: Public library
- Established: 1894
- Branches: 7

Collection
- Size: 423,107

Access and use
- Circulation: 2.2 million
- Population served: 214,500
- Members: 146,979

Other information
- Budget: $18.8 million (2023)
- Director: Andrew Chanse
- Employees: 88
- Website: spokanelibrary.org
- References: Washington Public Library Statistical Report, 2016

The Spokane Public Library is a public library system serving the city of Spokane, Washington, US. It has six branches and a central library in downtown Spokane, along with a bookmobile and online services. The library system was acquired by the municipal government in 1894 and is funded by the city budget and a separate property tax.

== History ==
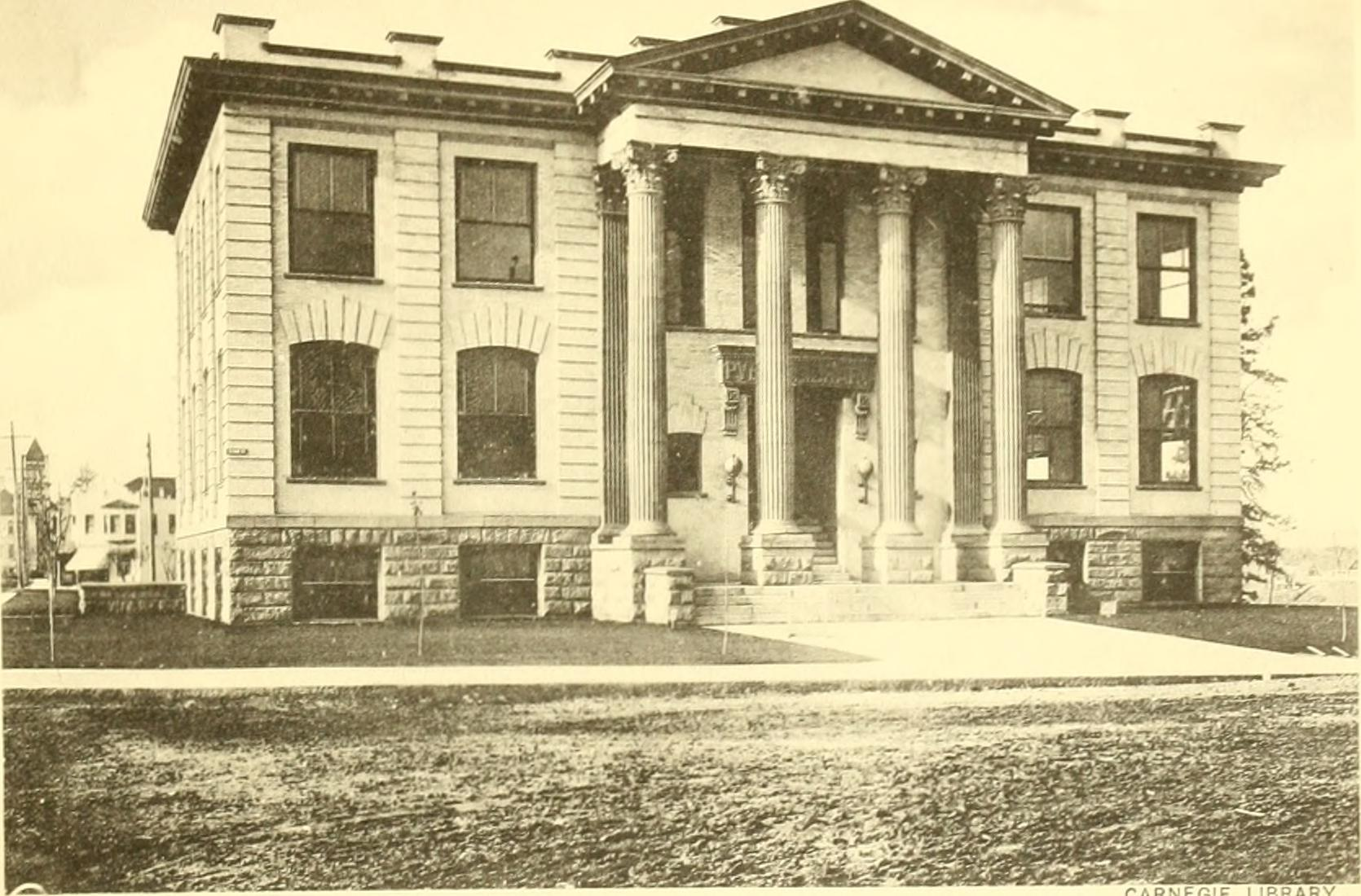
Carnegie Library ca. 1890s

The Spokane Public Library was established in 1894, after two unsuccessful attempts at creating a library system in the city. The system was acquired by the city from the Union Library Association, a partnership between the Sorosis Club and Carpenters Union, who had started the private library in 1891. The library rented space inside the city hall's basement, with a permanent location sought with funding from philanthropist Andrew Carnegie. The three-story Carnegie Library opened in 1904 at the western edge of downtown. The library system established three branches, also built with funds from Carnegie, in the early 1910s. The downtown library was replaced in 1963 with a branch in the Comstock Building, a former Sears Roebuck department store.

A bond issue passed by voters in 1990 enabled the library system to replace all four of its locations, including the Comstock branch. The current five-branch system and downtown library were all completed by 1998. In 2013, voters approved a property tax to partially fund library services, alongside allocated funds from the city budget. It was renewed by a referendum in 2017. All library branches were renovated or rebuilt as a part of a 2018 property tax bond worth and estimated $77 million and completed work in 2023. The $33 million renovation to the main branch in downtown sought to make the library more useful as a creative center as well as an information center and features study and co-working spaces, lecture, conference, and event spaces, play spaces for children, and a café in the atrium. Audio and video studio production facilities are housed on the third floor, where local community low-power radio station, KVFS-LP broadcasts live from the library.

== Branches ==
The Spokane Public Library system has six total locations, including branches established in the early 20th century. All of the branches were replaced with new libraries in the 1990s and all were renovated or replaced in between 2018 and 2023.

- Central (downtown) Library is located at the corner of Lincoln Street and Main Avenue, near the River Park Square shopping mall. It opened in January 1994 to replace the Comstock Library. The library was closed from February 2020 to July 2022 for a renovation project and was replaced by a temporary branch inside the STA Plaza transit center.
- Hillyard Library is located in the Hillyard neighborhood near Empire Avenue and Cook Street. It opened in January 1994.
- The Hive, a non-traditional library, is located in the East Central neighborhood on Sprague Avenue. It opened in 2021 under a partnership with Spokane Public Schools.
- Liberty Park Library is located in the East Central neighborhood. It opened in November 2021.
- Indian Trail Library is located in northwestern Spokane, near Indian Trail Road. It opened in March 1998.
- Shadle Park Library is located in Shadle Park on Wellesley Avenue. It opened in 1997.
- South Hill Library is located in the Comstock neighborhood on South Perry Street. It opened in January 1996.

== Former libraries ==
- Main (Carnegie Library) - 10 South Cedar
- North Monroe Branch - 925 West Montgomery Street
- Heath Branch - 525 Mission Street
- East Side Branch - 25 Altamont Street
- Hillyard Library - 2936 E Olympic Ave
