= Miller Block =

Miller Block may refer to:

- Miller Block (Tempe, Arizona), formerly listed on the National Register of Historic Places in Maricopa County, Arizona
- Miller Block (Cleveland, Ohio), listed on the National Register of Historic Places in Cuyahoga County, Ohio
- Miller Block (Spokane, Washington), listed on the National Register of Historic Places in Spokane County, Washington
