= The Globe Hotel (Spokane, Washington) =

- U.S. National Register of Historic Places
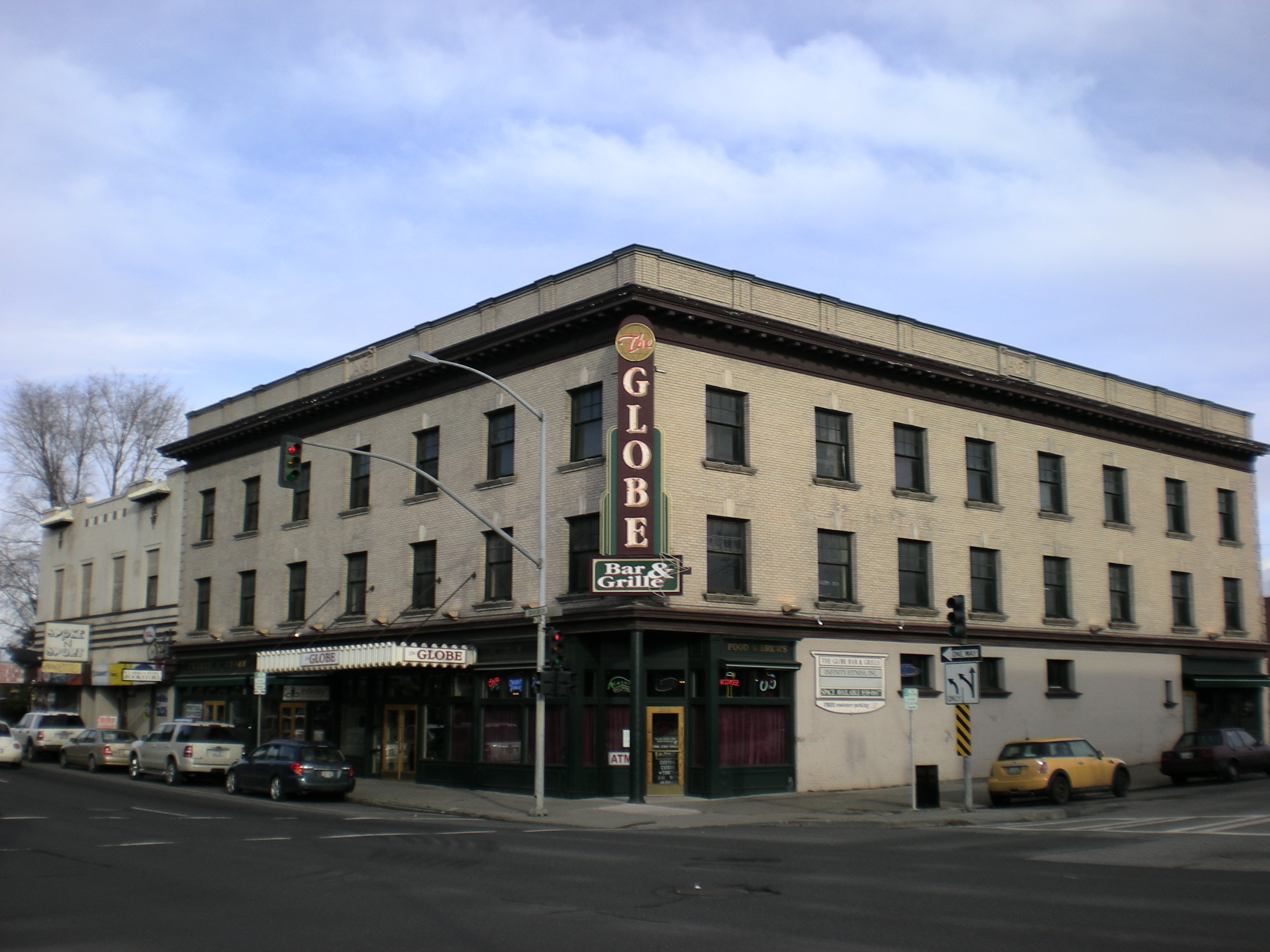
- The building in 2008

- Location within Spokane riverfront area
- Location: 204 North Division Street, Spokane, Washington
- Coordinates: 47°39′34″N 117°24′35″W
- Area: less than one acre
- Built: 1908
- Architect: Albert Held
- Architectural style: Early Commercial
- MPS: Single Room Occupancy Hotels in Central Business District of Spokane MPS
- NRHP reference No.: 97001080
- Added to NRHP: December 17, 1998

The Globe Hotel, also known as The Janet Block, is a historic three-story building in Spokane, Washington. It was designed by architect Albert Held, and built in 1908 at a cost of $80,000 for the Inland Investment Company. When it opened, the hotel had 32 en-suite rooms out of 72. It has been listed on the National Register of Historic Places since December 17, 1998.
