= Albert Held =

American architect

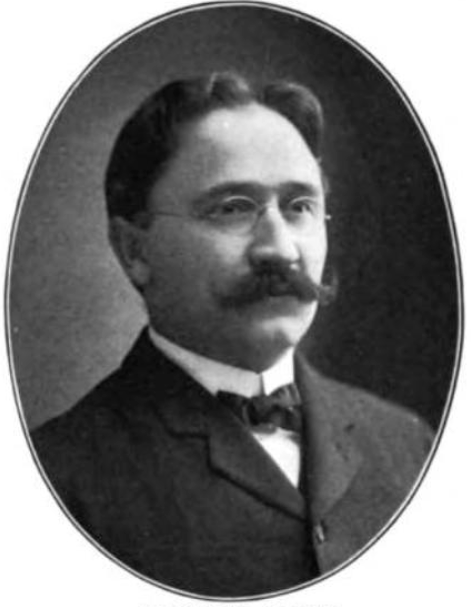
- Born: March 25, 1866; New Ulm, Minnesota, United States
- Died: June 28, 1924 (aged 58); Spokane, Washington
- Education: University of Minnesota
- Occupation: Architect
- Spouse: Kate C. Logan (m. 1903)
- Buildings: National Register of Historic Places listed buildings in Spokane, Washington

Albert Held (March 25, 1866 – 1924) was an American architect. He was born in New Ulm, Minnesota on March 25, 1866, and studied for two years at the University of Minnesota. He first worked as a draftsman

Held moved to Spokane, Washington after the fire of 1889 because of the work necessary to rebuild the city. He was the first architect in the American Institute of Architects from Spokane/Eastern Washington. He died in 1924 after a long illness.

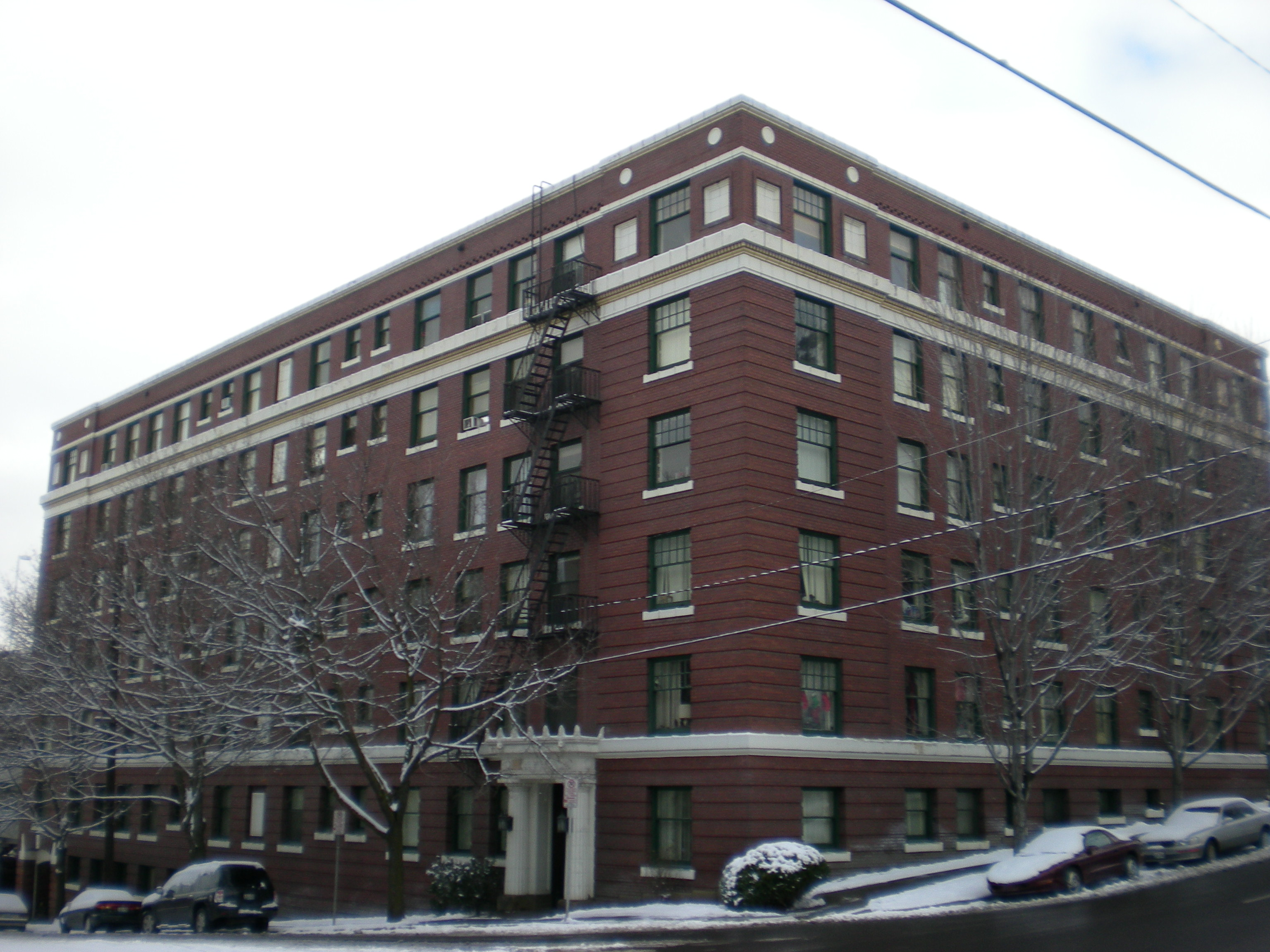
The Breslin

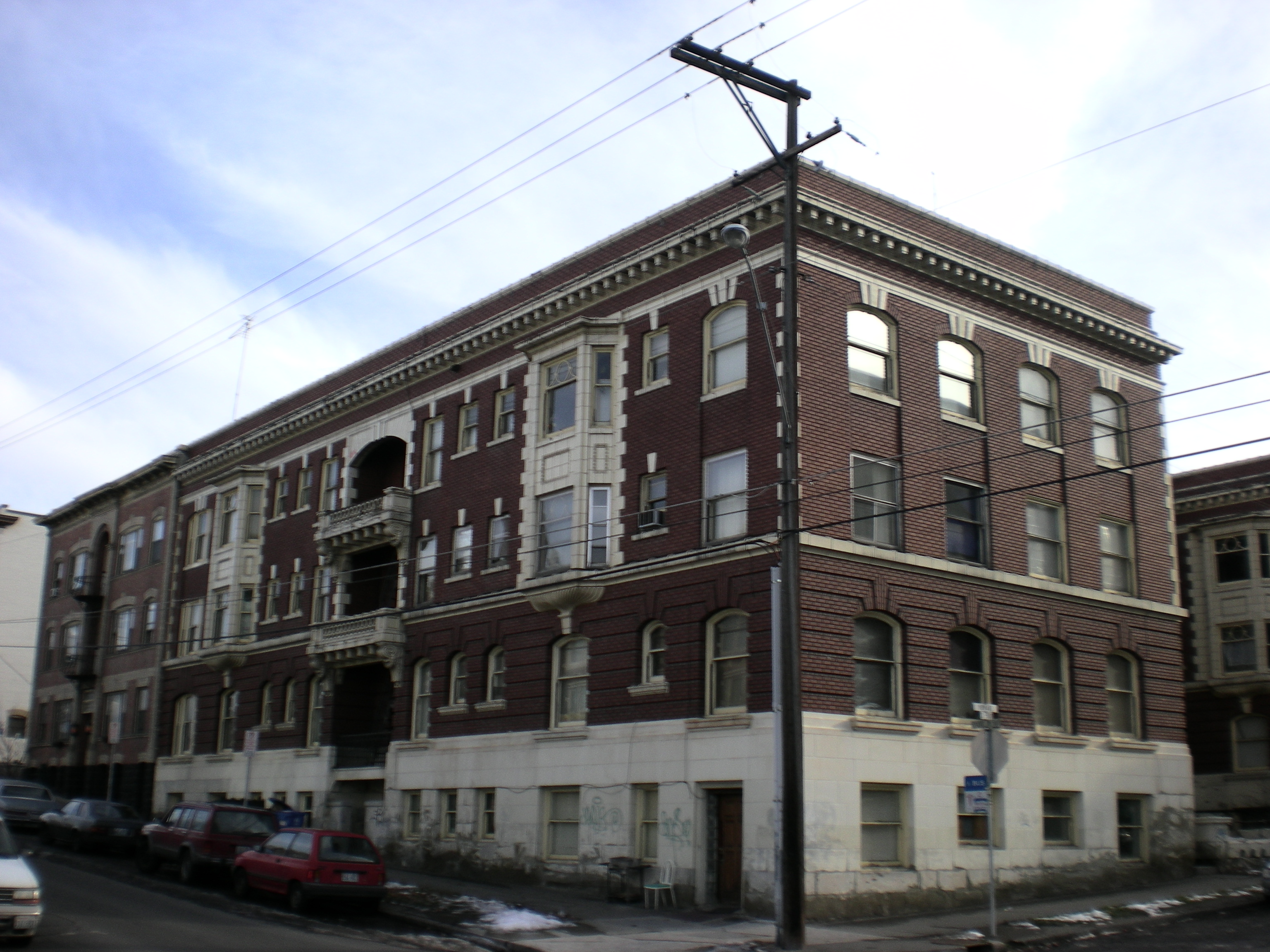
The Knickerbocker

He designed a number of buildings in Spokane, Washington that are listed on the U.S. National Register of Historic Places.

Works include (with attribution):

- Amman, W. 1516 Riverside
- Breslin, S. 729 Bernard
- Frequency Changing Station, E. 1420 Celesta Ave.
- The Globe Hotel, 204 N. Division St.
- Holley-Mason Building, S. 157 Howard
- Knickerbocker, (built 1911) S. 501-507 Howard
- San Marco, W. 1229 Riverside
- Spokane Public Library-East Side Branch, 25 Altamont St.
- Spokane Public Library-North Monroe Branch, 925 W. Montgomery St.
- James and Corinne Williams House, 1225 W. 19th Ave.
