= Spokane Club Building-Legion Building =

- Spokane Club Building--Legion Building
- U.S. National Register of Historic Places
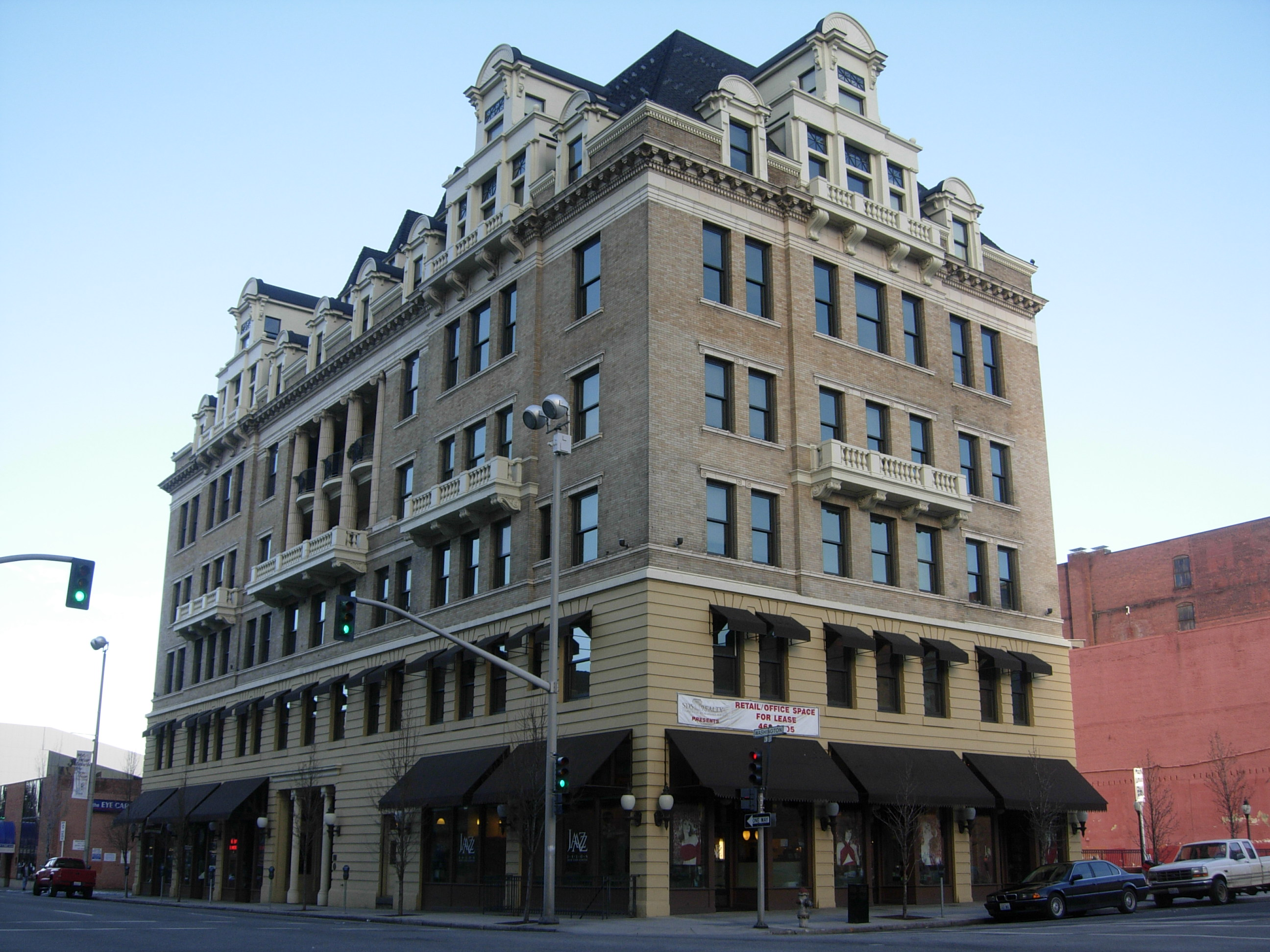
- The building in 2007

- Location within Spokane riverfront area
- Location: 108 North Washington Street, Spokane, Washington
- Coordinates: 47°39′30″N 117°25′00″W
- Area: less than one acre
- Built: 1901
- Built by: Peter Peterson
- Architect: John K. Dow
- Architectural style: Renaissance Revival
- NRHP reference No.: 94000800
- Added to NRHP: August 8, 1994

The Spokane Club Building-Legion Building is a historic five-story building in Spokane, Washington. It was designed by architect John K. Dow in the Renaissance Revival style, and built by Peter Peterson in 1901 for businessman F. Lewis Clark, the founder of the Spokane Club. It has been listed on the National Register of Historic Places since August 8, 1994.
