= Breslin (Spokane, Washington) =

- U.S. National Register of Historic Places
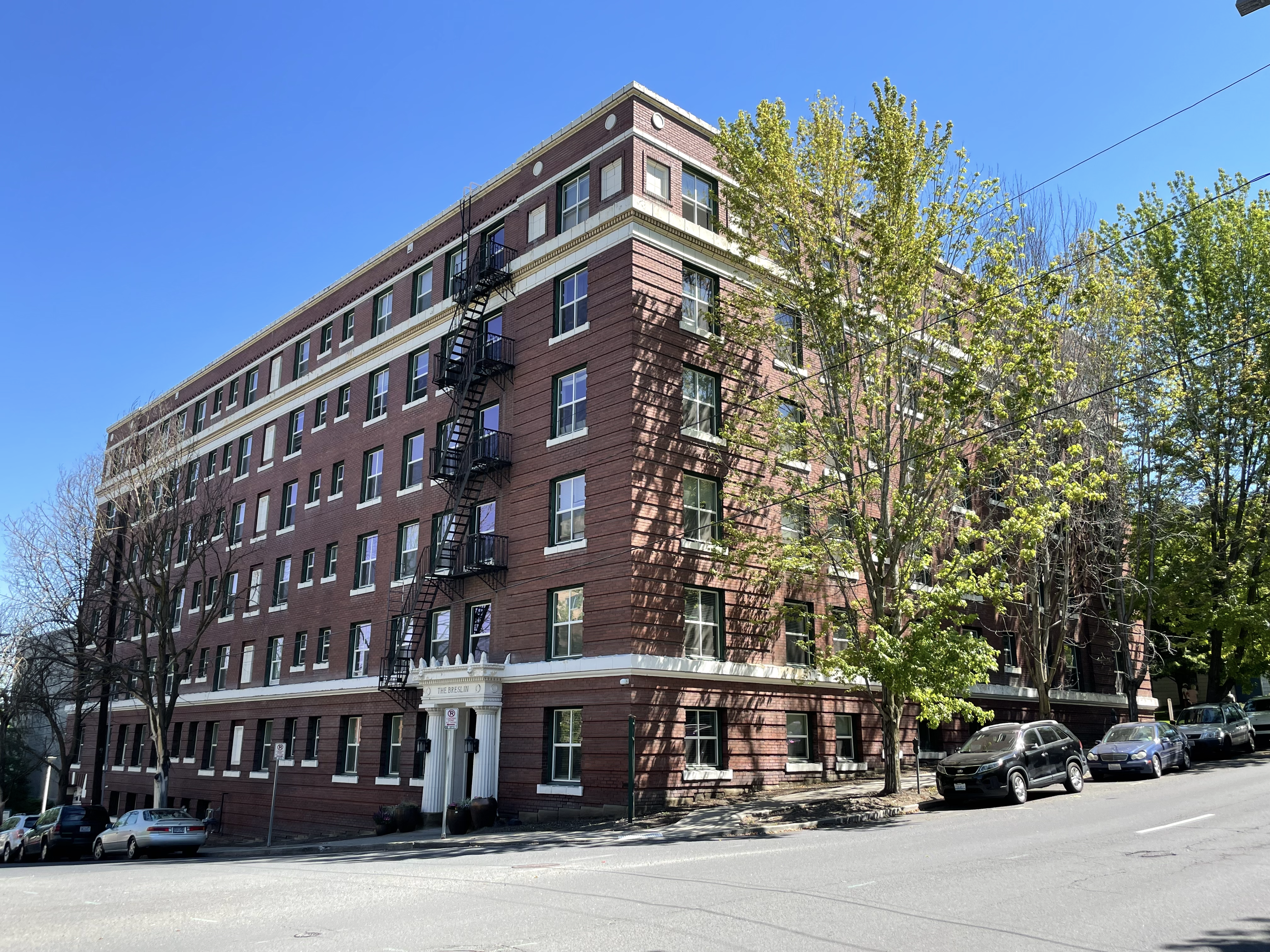
- The building in June 2022

- Location within Spokane riverfront area
- Location: South 729 Bernard, Spokane, Washington
- Coordinates: 47°38′56″N 117°24′54″W
- Area: less than one acre
- Built: 1910
- Built by: W.H. Stanley
- Architect: Albert Held
- Architectural style: Classical Revival
- MPS: Apartment Buildings by Albert Held TR
- NRHP reference No.: 87000095
- Added to NRHP: February 12, 1987

The Breslin is a historic six-story building in the Cliff/Cannon neighborhood of Spokane, Washington. It was designed by architect Albert Held in the Classical Revival style, and built in 1910 by W.H. Stanley with "Tenino sandstone, press red brick and cream-colored terra cotta" at a cost of $100,000.

The six-story, flat-roofed building is L-shaped, with wings along Eighth Avenue and Bernard Street. The two wings surround a courtyard in the rear of the building. This design gives each apartment a view out either onto Eighth Avenue, Bernard Street or the courtyard. There is also a daylight basement allowed for by the sloping hill along Bernard. The exterior is composed of red brick with white terra cotta ornamentation.

Aside from its age alone, the Breslin is a historically significant building due to the community it was built to house. Spokane's population boomed in late 19th and early 20th centuries, and the city faced a housing shortage. For poor and working class people, the shortage was alleviated by the presence of hotels, boarding houses and flats for rent. However, there was little available housing stock for middle class people who did not own a home. Prior to 1900, the city listings showed no "apartment homes" in Spokane. Between 1900 and 1907 the city added over 40,000 people, and the city turned to the construction of apartment homes to help ease the housing shortage. Unlike other early apartment homes, which appeared as if they were large single-family homes or luxury clubs and hotels, the Breslin's design was forthright about its purpose. The Breslin, along with other buildings designed by Held, were among the very first apartment homes built in Spokane specifically for middle and upper-middle class tenants.

It has been listed on the National Register of Historic Places since February 12, 1987. The Breslin, along with the Amman, Knickerbocker and San Marco buildings, all designed by Held, were listed on the NRHP together as part of a thematic group nomination. All four are considered significant examples of early 20th century apartment construction.

The Breslin was sold for $6.5 million in 2021. At the time, the Breslin was home to 46 units ranging from studio apartments to one and two-bedroom units. In June 2022, the new owners filed a permit for renovations that would include the addition of eight studio apartment units to the basement and first story of the building.

== Gallery ==
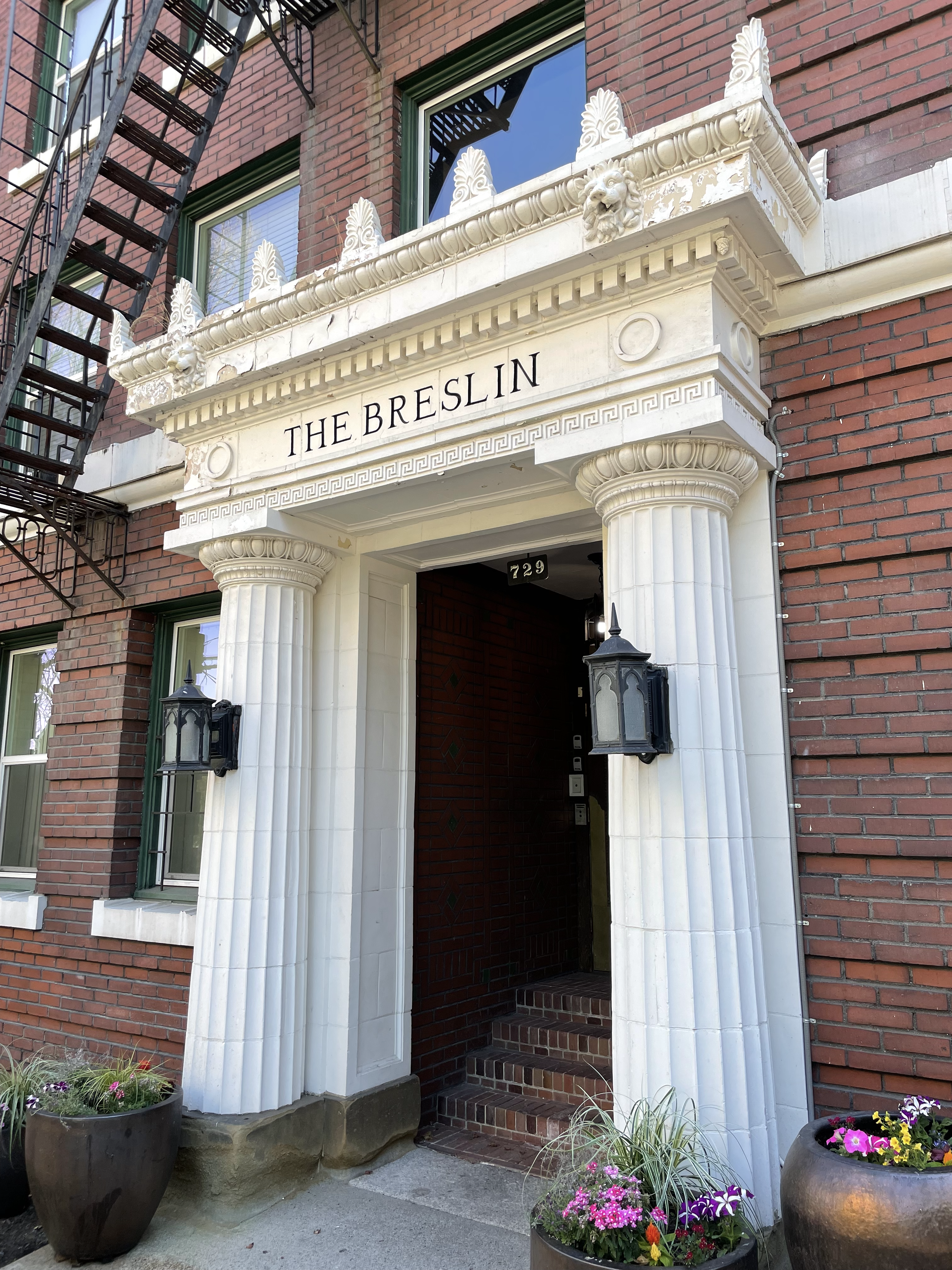
Detail view of the Breslin's main entrance

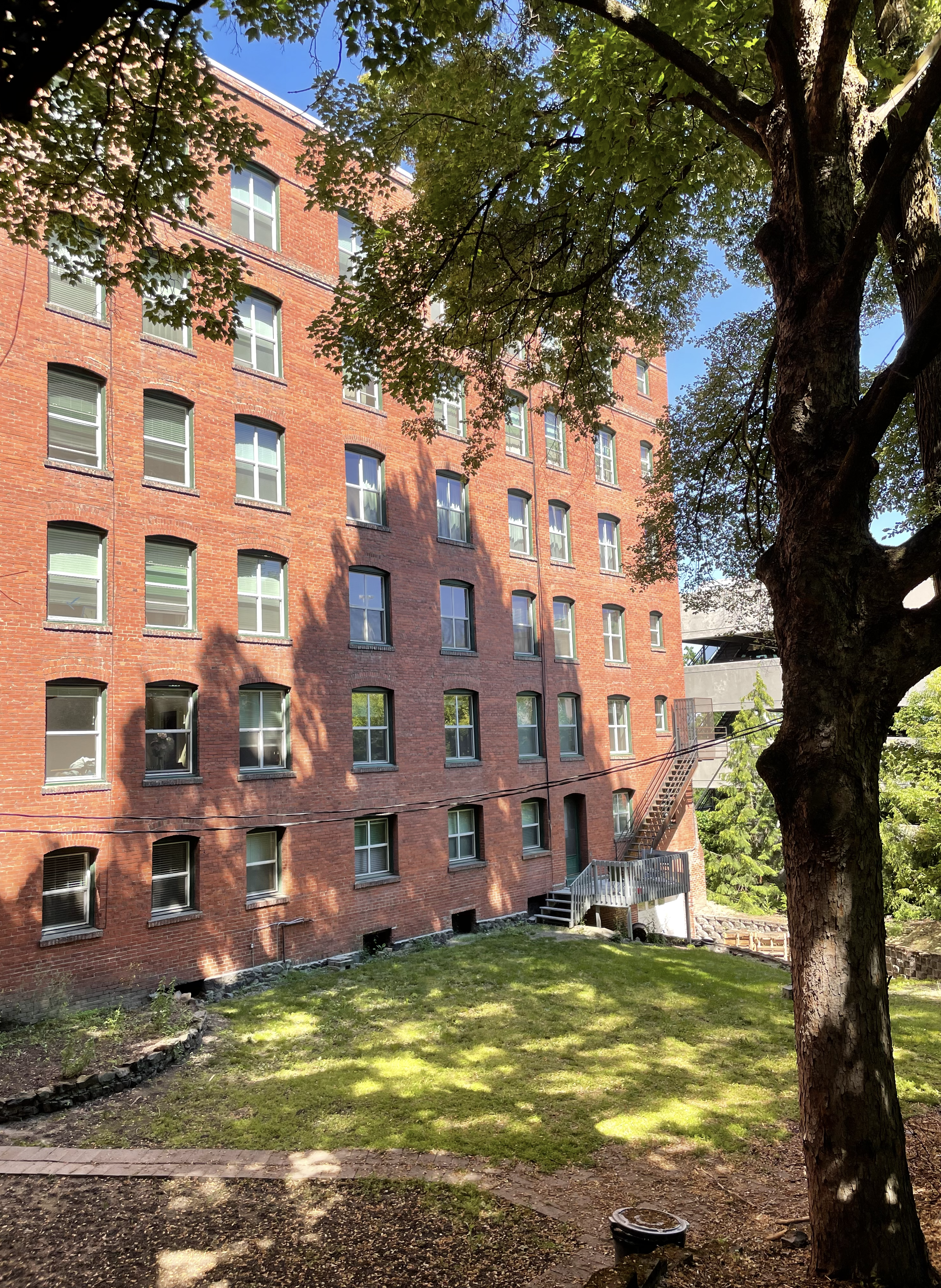
View of the Breslin's rear courtyard

== See also ==
- National Register of Historic Places listings in Spokane County, Washington
