= Holley-Mason Building =

- U.S. National Register of Historic Places
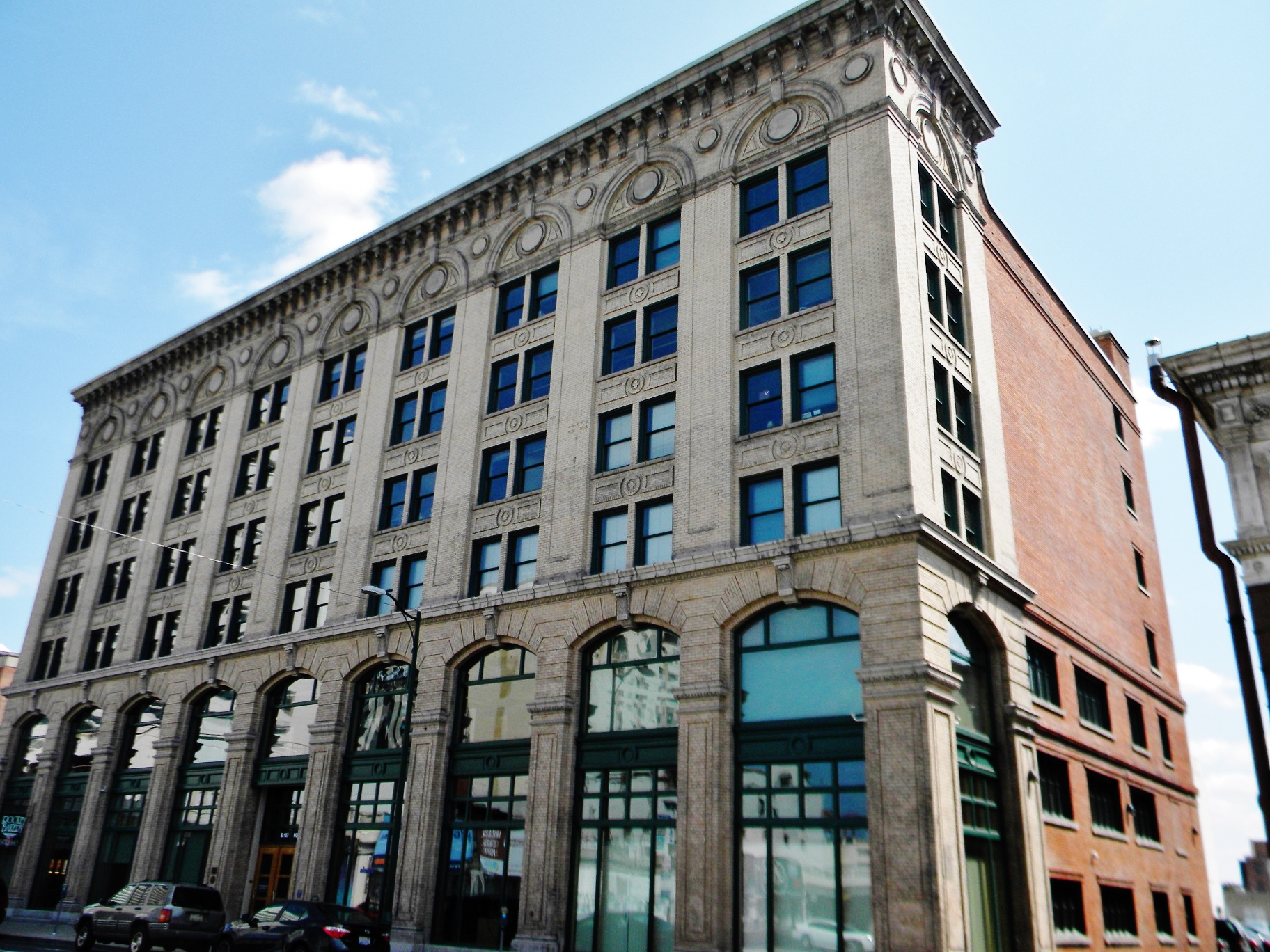
- The building in 2015

- Location within Spokane riverfront area
- Location: South 157 Howard, Spokane, Washington
- Coordinates: 47°39′19″N 117°25′12″W
- Area: less than one acre
- Built: 1905
- Architect: Albert Held
- Architectural style: Renaissance Revival
- NRHP reference No.: 83004262
- Added to NRHP: October 13, 1983

The Holley-Mason Building is a historic six-story building in Spokane, Washington. It was designed by architect Albert Held in the Renaissance Revival style, and built in 1905 at a cost of $200,000 for the Holley-Mason Hardware Company. It has been listed on the National Register of Historic Places since October 13, 1983.
