= Amman (Spokane, Washington) =

- Amman / Ammann
- U.S. National Register of Historic Places
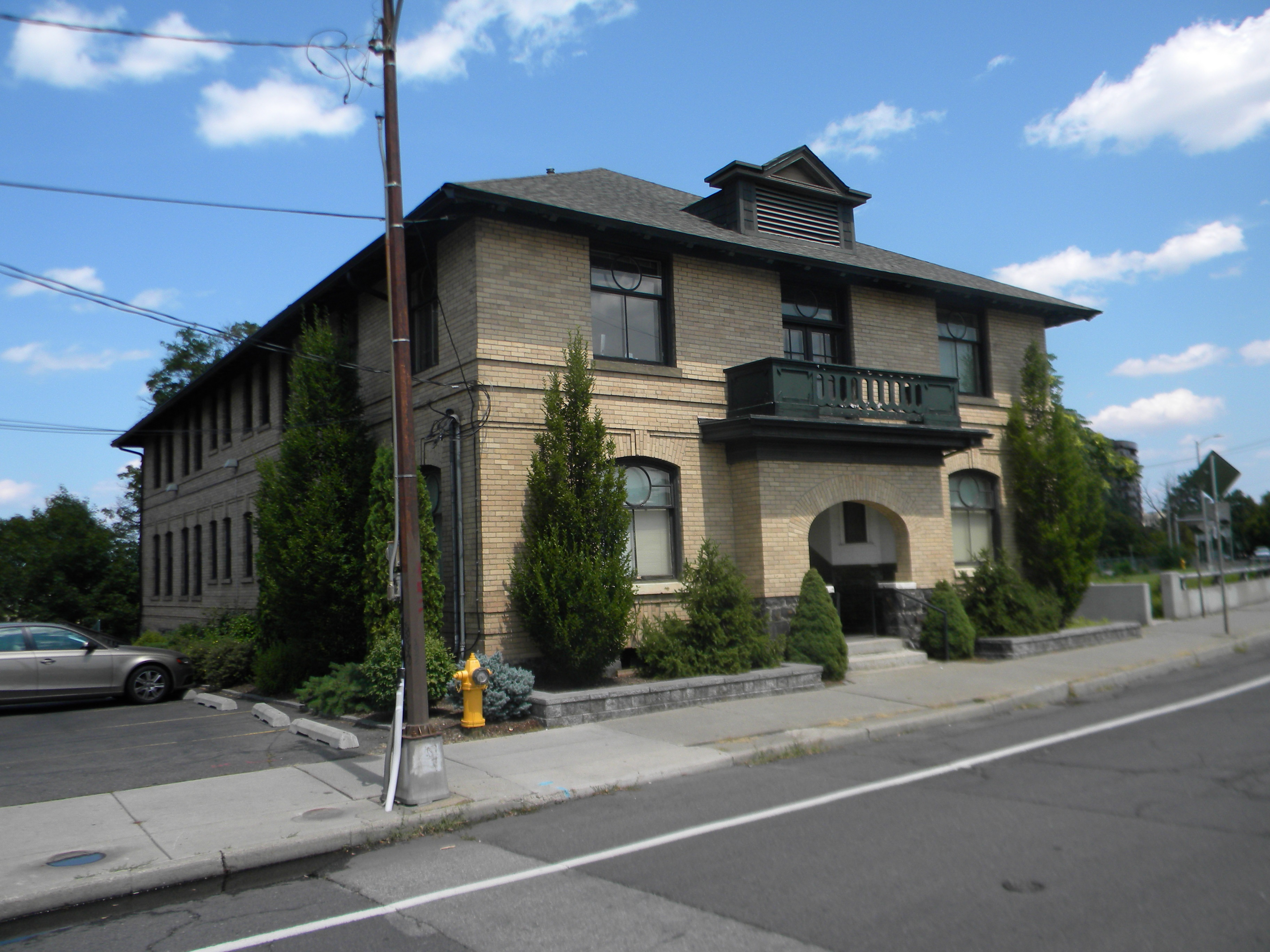

- Location within Spokane riverfront area
- Location: W. 1516 Riverside, Spokane, Washington
- Coordinates: 47°39′23.9″N 117°26′5.1″W
- Area: less than one acre
- Built: 1904
- Architect: Albert Held
- MPS: Apartment Buildings by Albert Held TR
- NRHP reference No.: 87000086
- Added to NRHP: February 12, 1987

Amman or Ammann, in the Browne's Addition neighborhood of Spokane, Washington is a building constructed in 1904. It was designed by architect Albert Held. The building was listed on the U.S. National Register of Historic Places in 1987. Although the National Register of Historic Places list the property under the name Amman the Spokane Register of Historic Places lists the building as Ammann.

As of 2022, the building is known as The Dormitory and home to a mix of retail and office space surrounding the central common area on the first and second stories. Retail on the first floor, as of 2022 includes a coffee shop and roaster, and a bakery and cheese shop.

== History ==
In August 1903, the lot Amman stands on was sold to Caroline Ammann by the Northwestern and Pacific Hypotheekbank. Construction began by March 1904, when Apartment units in the building were advertised in the local paper, The Spokesman-Review. The building was used as housing until 1985, when it underwent a National Park Service certified rehabilitation turning the apartments into office space. The renovation was done by Wells & Company, a company specializing in certified renovations of old and historic buildings. The building was added to the National Register of Historic Places as part of a thematic group containing San Marco, Breslin and Knickerbocker Apartment Buildings.

== Description ==
The two-story building sits on a tree lined street in Browne's Addition, the neighborhood has a uniquely residential feel considering its proximity to the city center. The lot to the west of the building is used for parking. Due to its location, the building offers views of the Spokane River. Of the buildings in the thematic group, the Amman Apartments had the simplest design, with a square footprint rather than the U, H and L shapes of the other apartment buildings built by Held. The building design can most easily be described as classical. The apartment units had clear delineation of living and entertainment spaces by use of narrow hallways in order to separate the design from common "railroad" plans. Another unique feature is that all rooms had an exterior view, instead of the common light court of the era. The common hallway features a large curved stairway and access to the balcony above the portico on the second story.

== Gallery ==
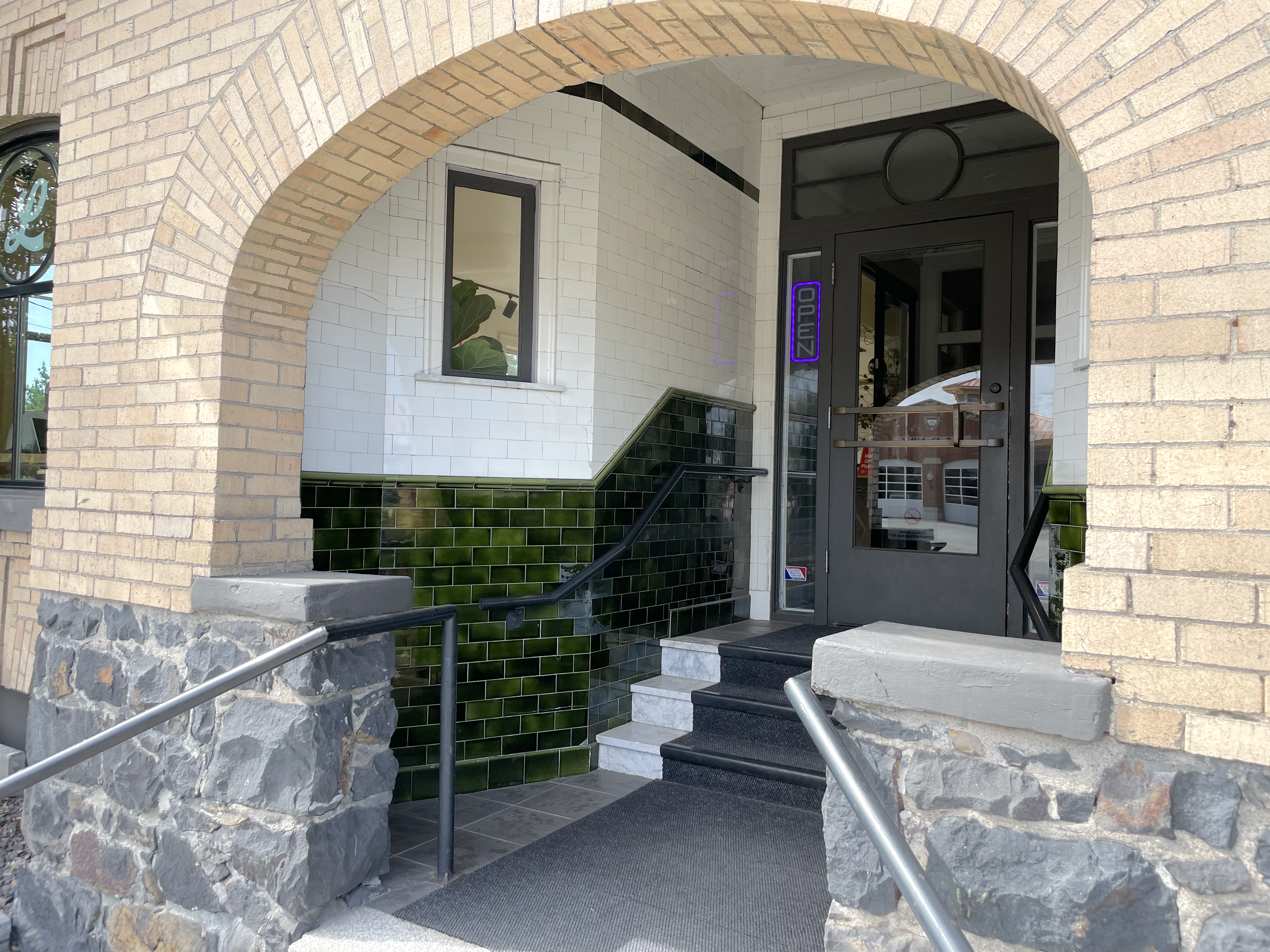
Detail view of the main entrance

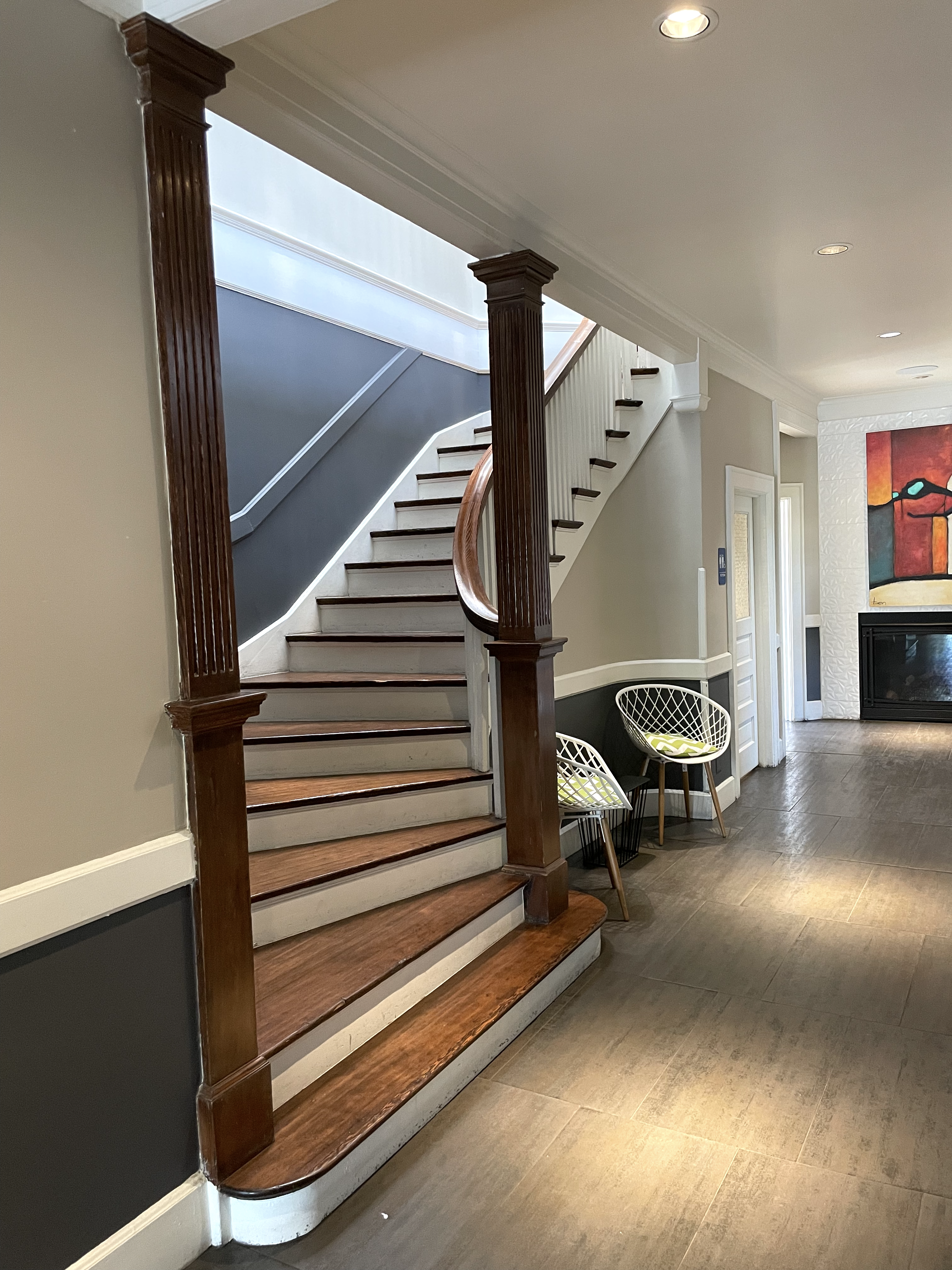
Staircase to second story

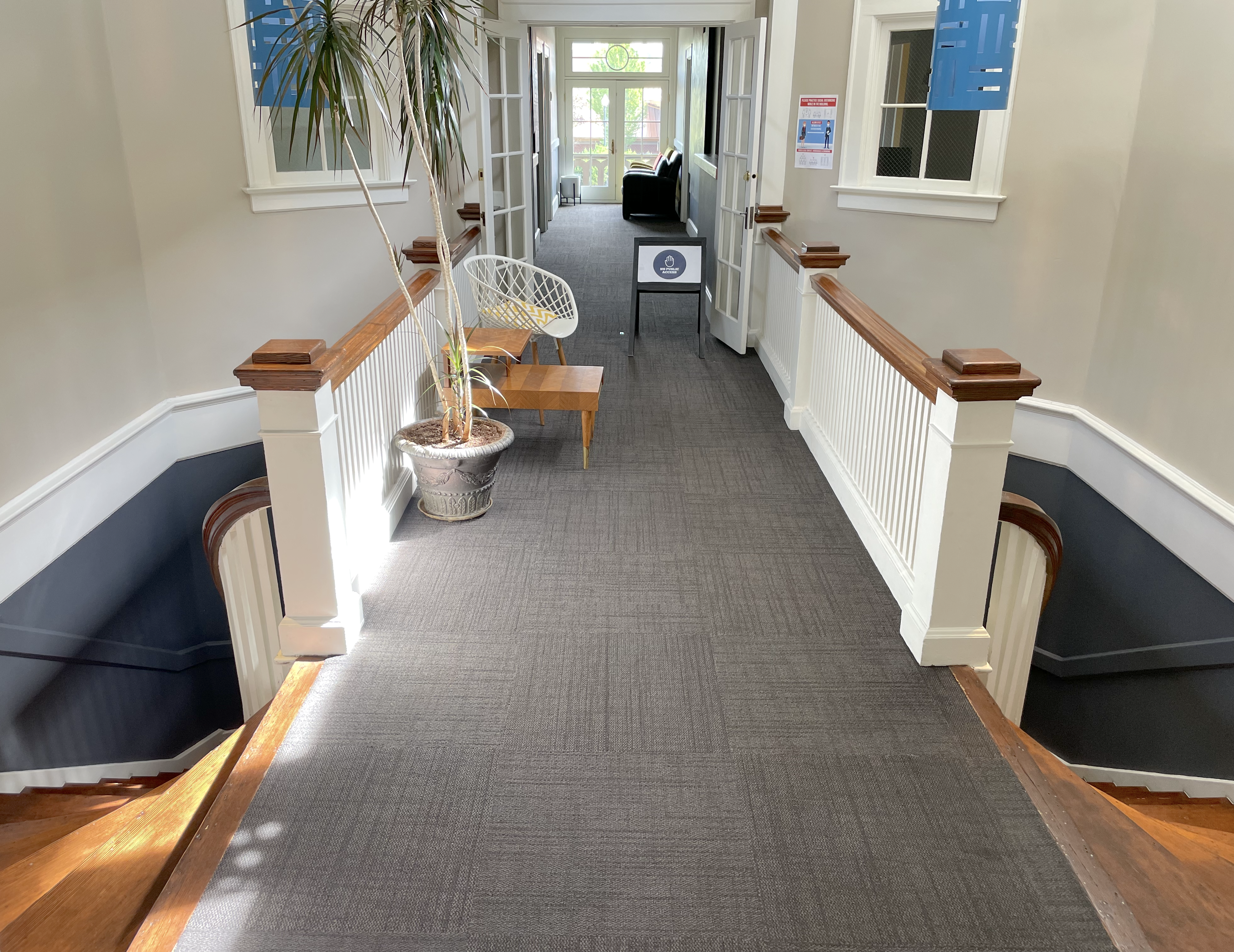
Second story showing parallel staircases
