= San Marco (Spokane, Washington) =

- U.S. National Register of Historic Places
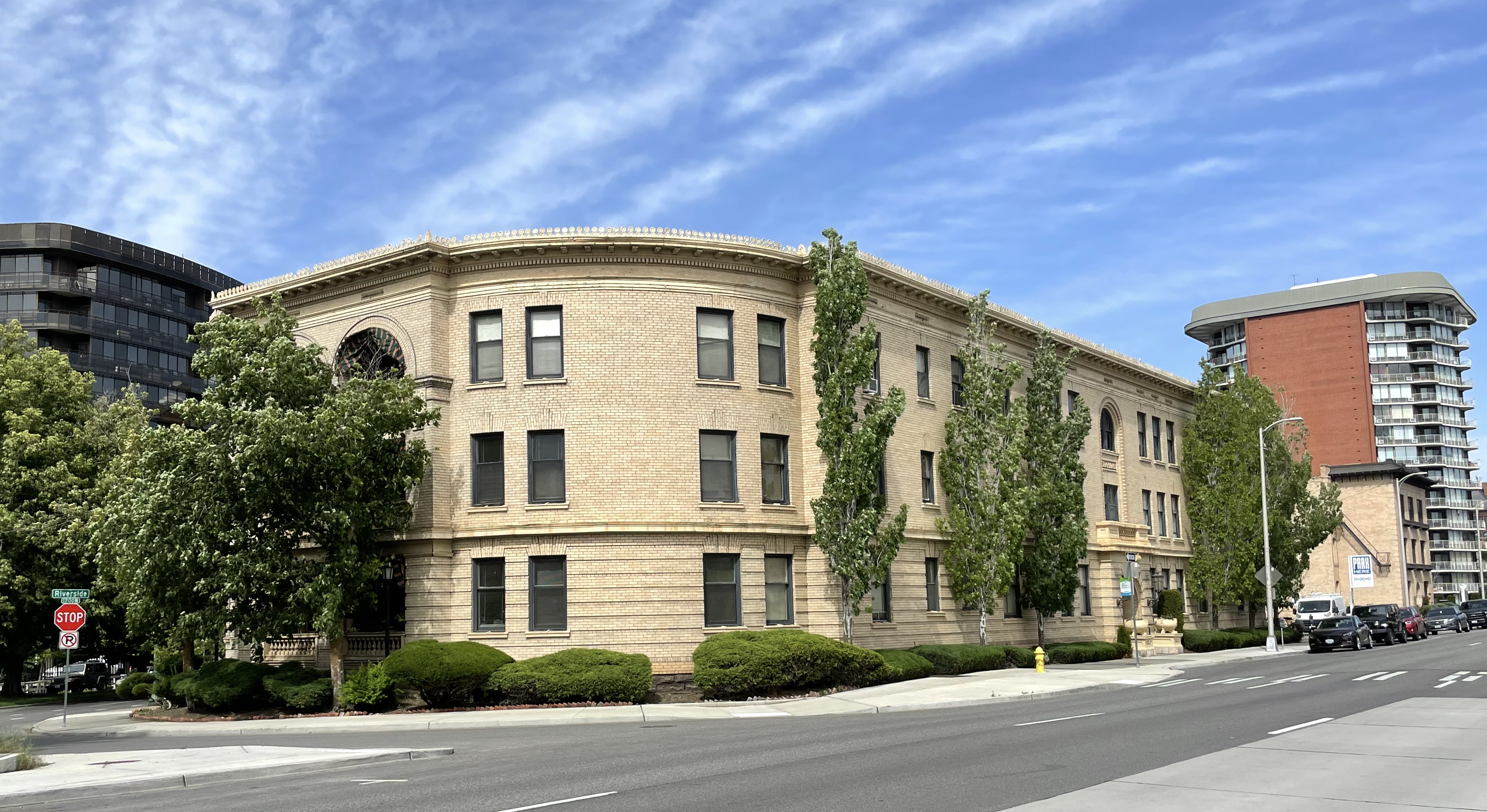
- San Marco on Sprague Avenue

- Location within Spokane riverfront area
- Location: W. 1229 Riverside, Spokane, Washington
- Coordinates: 47°39′27″N 117°25′48″W
- Area: less than one acre
- Built: 1904
- Architect: Held, Albert
- Architectural style: Late 19th and 20th Century Revivals architecture, Renaissance Revival
- MPS: Apartment Buildings by Albert Held TR
- NRHP reference No.: 87000090
- Added to NRHP: February 12, 1987

The San Marco is a historic Renaissance Revival apartment building in Downtown, Spokane, Washington that was built in 1904. It was designed by architect Albert Held. San Marco was listed on the U.S. National Register of Historic Places in 1987. It is also listed on the NRHP as a contributing property in the Riverside Avenue Historic District.

== History ==
Built in 1904 by owner George C. Beck, who intended the San Marco to be, "one of the most elegant, expensive buildings" in the city and home to, "flats to lease to the upper crust." The intention to lease apartments to members of upper class society was one of the contributing factors to the San Marco, along with three other apartment buildings designed by Held in the first decade of the 20th century — Amman, Breslin and Knickerbocker — being listed on the NRHP together as part of a thematic group. The San Marco, like the Amman, Breslin and Knickerbocker, represents the initial wave of apartment homes built in Spokane. At the turn of the century the city of Spokane was experiencing a population surge, which was accompanied by a housing shortage. Prior to 1900, city listings showed no "apartment homes" in Spokane. The upper and middle classes tended to own property, while the lower and working classes could rent from hotels, boarding houses or in commercial structures. There was a stigma against apartment homes for upper and middle class tenants at the time, but the housing shortage necessitated their construction. To alleviate the stigma, Held designed the San Marco like he did with other early apartment homes, to appear as if it was a grand hotel or exclusive club. The residential setting of the San Marco was also emphasized to help alleviate the stigma. It was set on the tree-lined Riverside Avenue, and an interior courtyard was included in the plans.

The San Marco's historic importance was recognized first in 1976, when it was listed on the NRHP as a contributing property in the Riverside Avenue Historic District, and then again in 1987 when it along with three of Held's other buildings were listed as individual properties on the NRHP.

Developer Ron Wells bought the San Marco, as well as seven other buildings within a one block radius of First and Cedar, in the 1980s. At the time, the area was considered undesirable and home to many vagrants. Wells renovated the San Marco, along with his other properties, in the 1980s and early 1990s. Renovation and preservation work on the San Marco and surrounding area helped spur massive investment in Downtown's west end, which continues into the 2020s.

== Description ==
San Marco is a U-shaped building situated at the triangular intersection of Riverside Avenue and Sprague Avenue in the west end of Downtown Spokane and the western extremity of the Riverside Avenue Historic District. The two wings of the building, along Riverside and Sprague, surround an interior courtyard with an open end to the east. The Riverside wing is about 200 feet long while the Sprague wing is about 130 feet in length. It is a three-story building with a tan brick exterior above a similarly colored sandstone foundation.

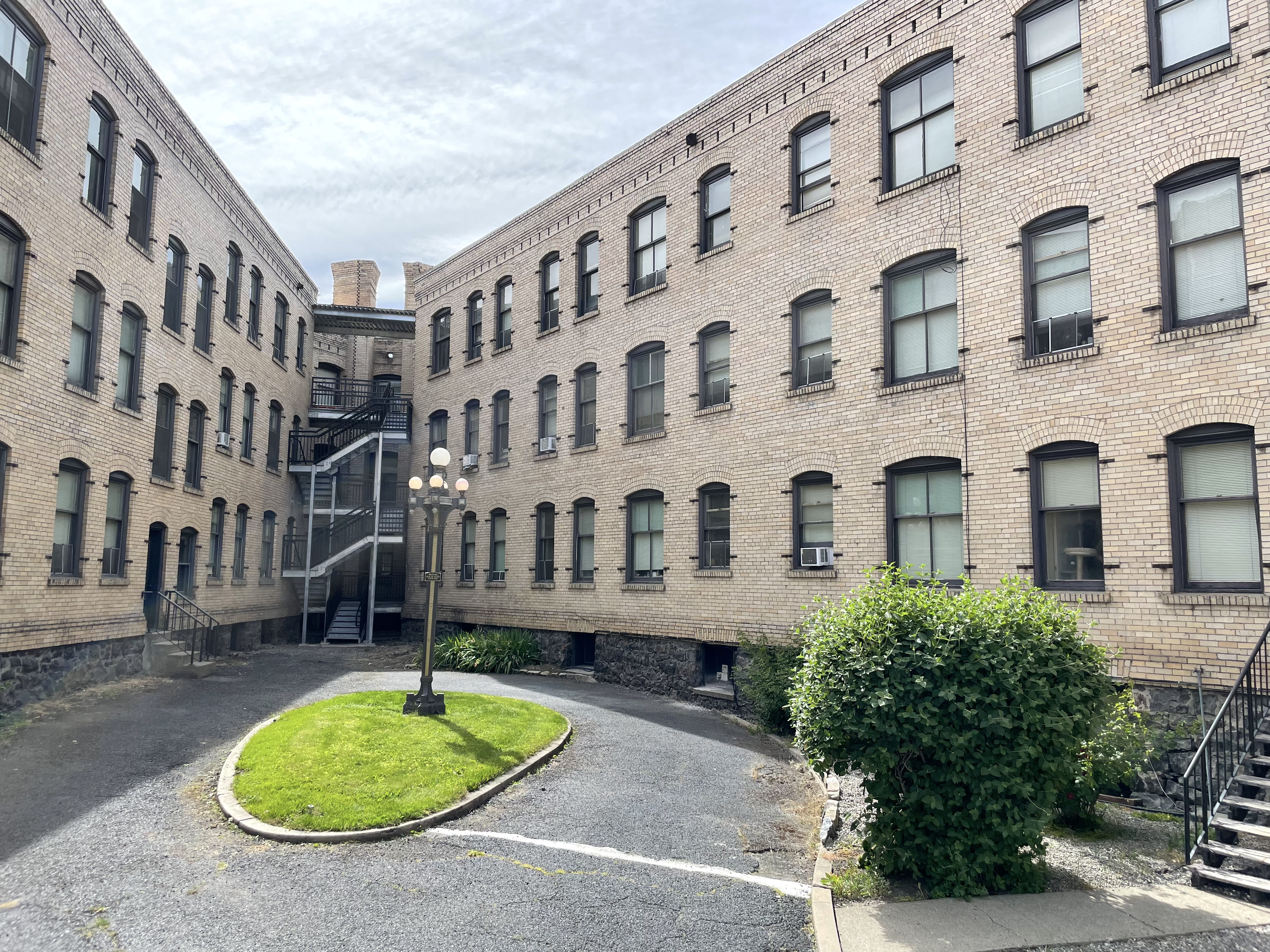
Interior courtyard

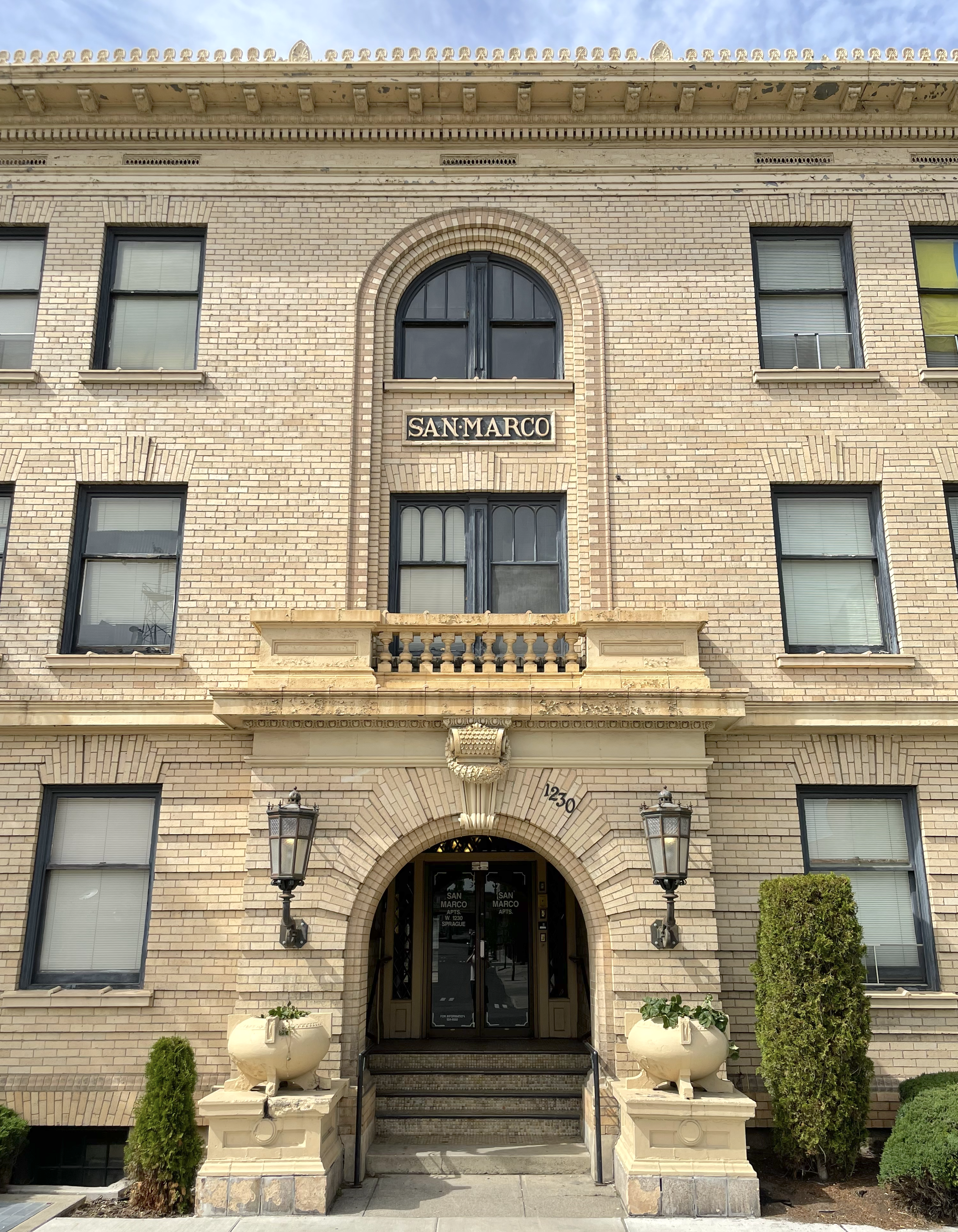
Sprague Ave. entrance

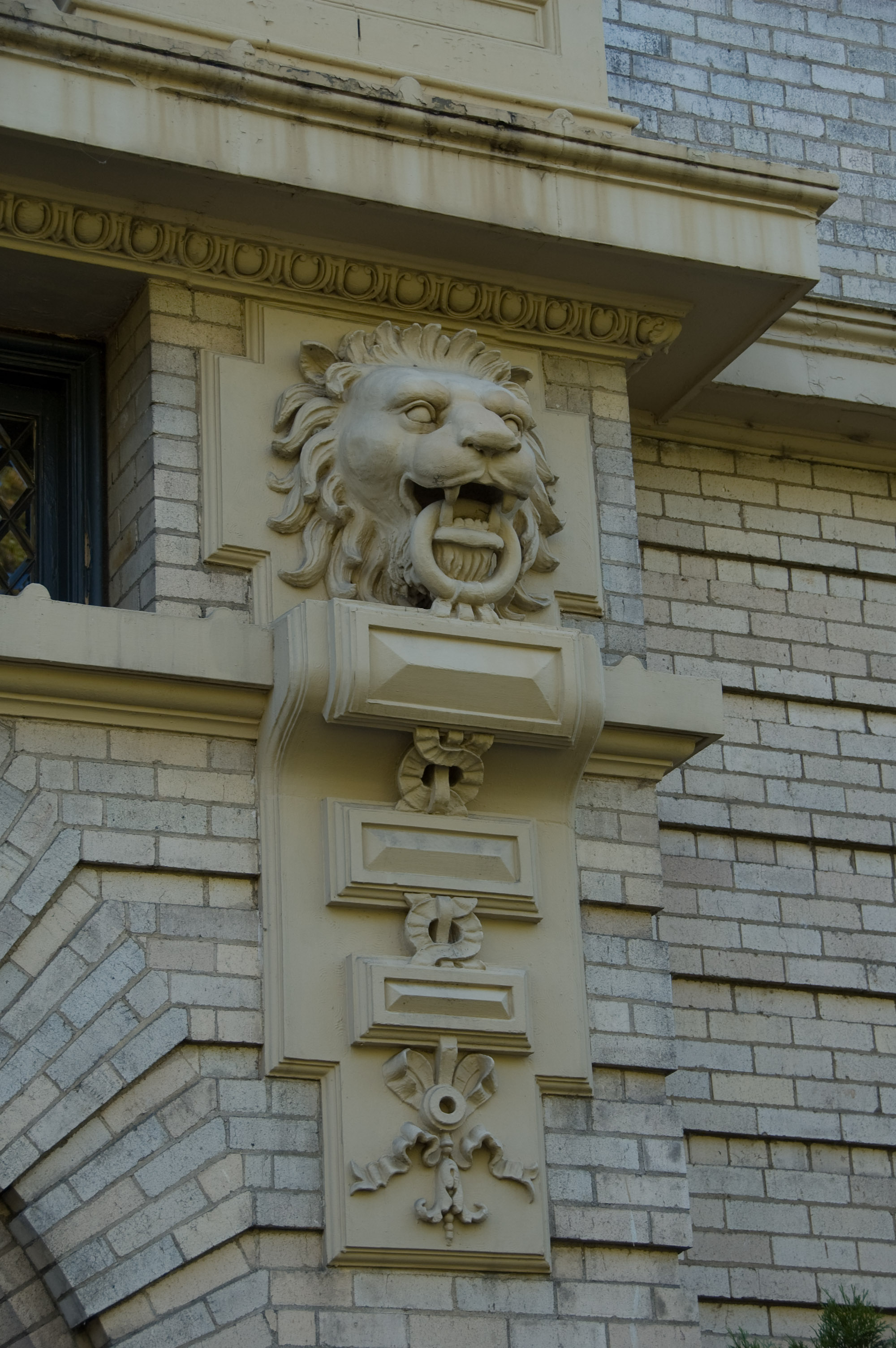
Architectural embellishment
