= Miller Block (Spokane, Washington) =

- U.S. National Register of Historic Places
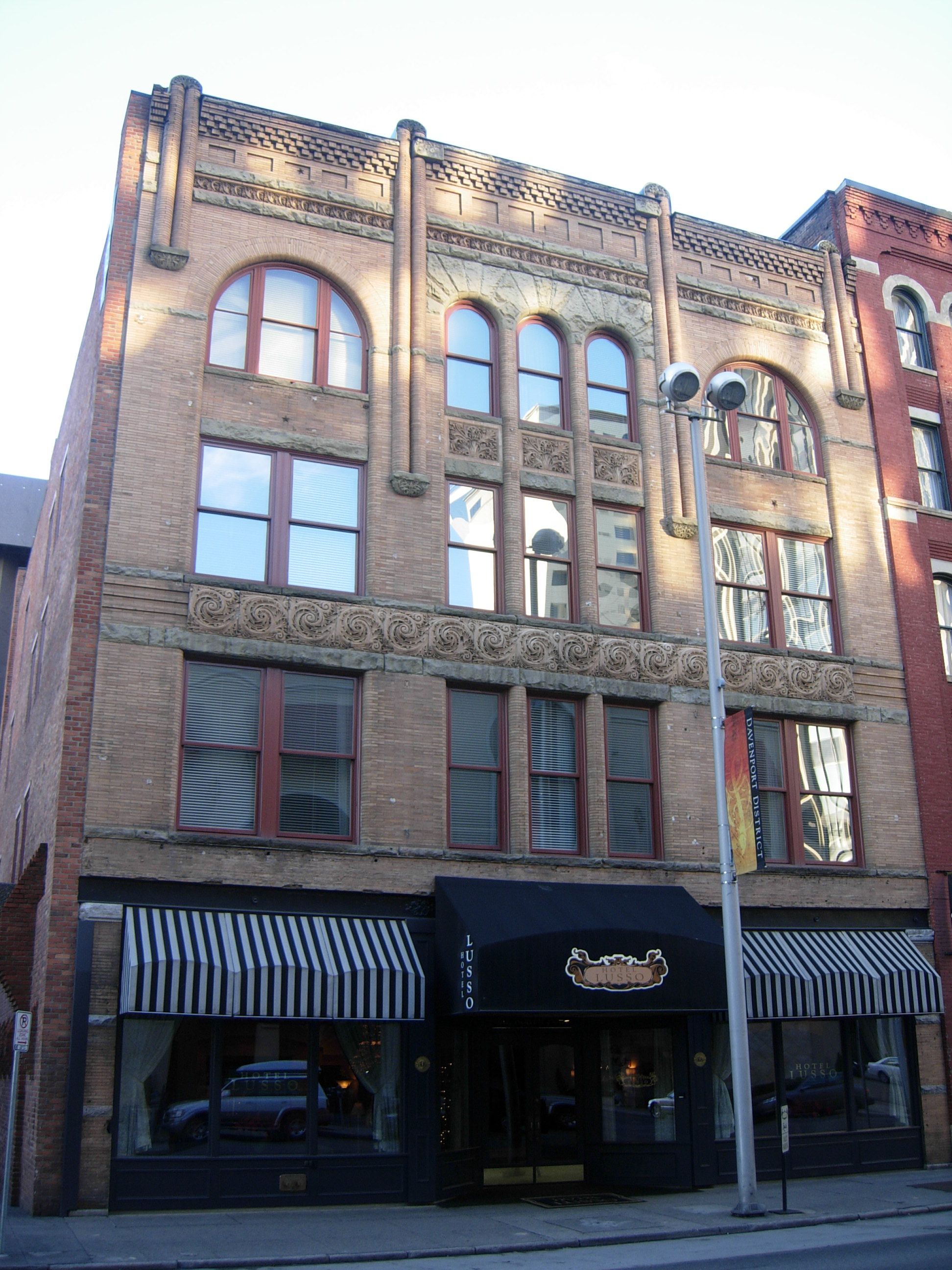
- The building in 2007

- Location within Spokane riverfront area
- Location: 808 West Sprague Avenue, Spokane, Washington
- Coordinates: 47°39′28″N 117°25′22″W
- Area: less than one acre
- Built: 1890
- Architect: William J. Carpenter
- Architectural style: Romanesque Revival
- NRHP reference No.: 98000370
- Added to NRHP: May 4, 1998

The Miller Block is a historic four-story building in Spokane, Washington. It was designed by William J. Carpenter in the Romanesque Revival style, and built in 1890. It has been listed on the National Register of Historic Places since May 4, 1998.
