= Knickerbocker (Spokane, Washington) =

- U.S. National Register of Historic Places
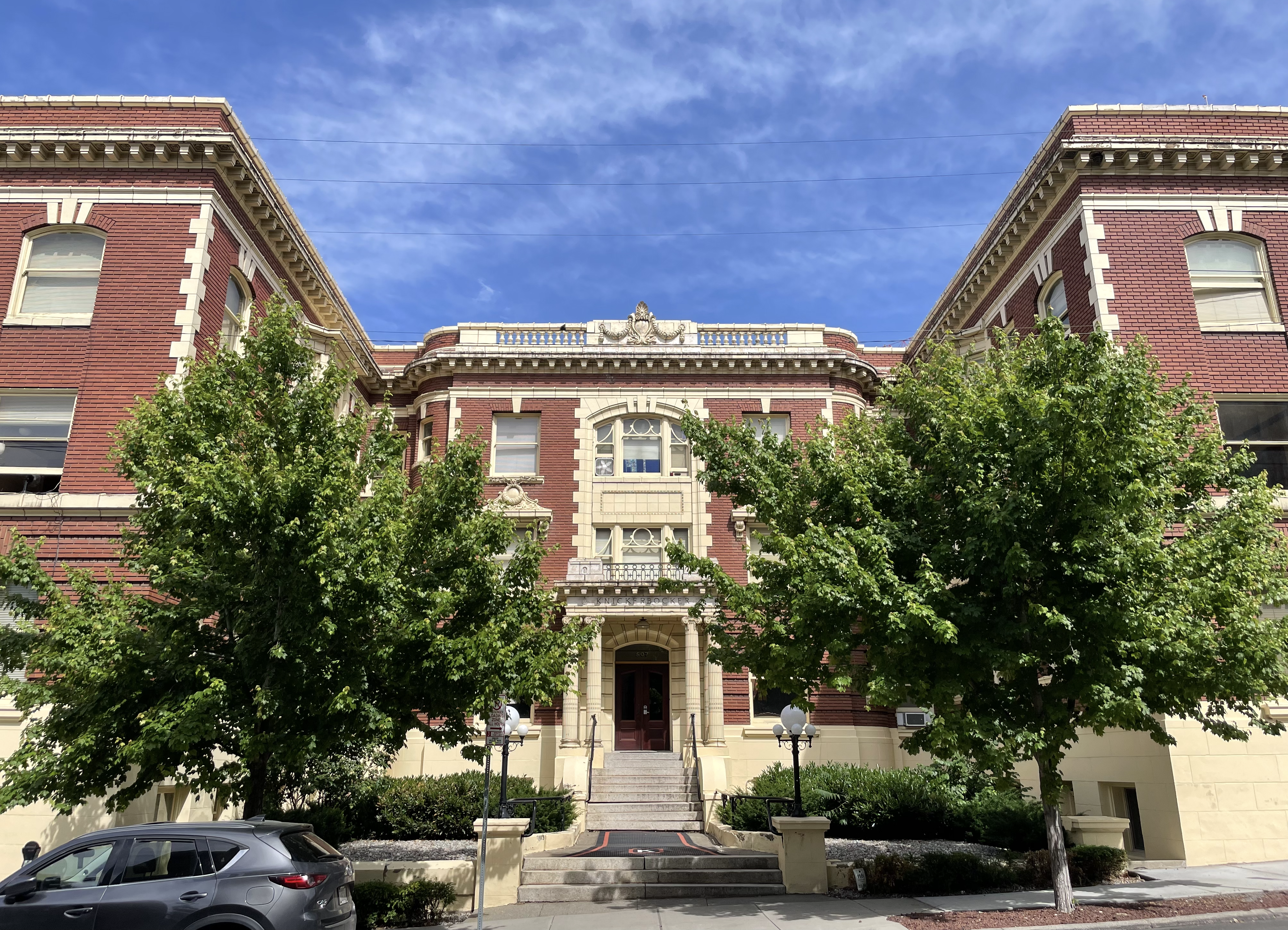
- Knickerbocker in 2022

- Location within Spokane riverfront area
- Location: S. 501-507 Howard, Spokane, Washington
- Coordinates: 47°39′5″N 117°25′10″W
- Area: less than one acre
- Built: 1911
- Architect: Held, Albert
- Architectural style: Beaux Arts
- MPS: Apartment Buildings by Albert Held TR
- NRHP reference No.: 87000096
- Added to NRHP: February 12, 1987

Knickerbocker is a historic Beaux Arts building located in the Cliff/Cannon neighborhood of Spokane, Washington. It was designed by architect Albert Held and was built in 1911. It was listed on the National Register of Historic Places in 1987. The building is also listed on the Spokane Register of Historic Places, under the name Knickerbocker Apartments.

== History ==
The Knickerbocker was financed by local civic leader and mining magnate Graham B. Dennis at a price of $200,000 in 1911. Architect Albert Held, who designed many other luxury apartment buildings of the day, was expected to produce the “finest apartment house west of New York.” At the time of construction, Spokane was experiencing a population surge as well as an accompanying housing shortage. Prior to 1900, "apartment homes" did not exist in Spokane. Middle and upper class residents owned property, while lower and working class residents lived largely in rental units at hotels, commercial buildings and boarding houses. The Knickerbocker, along with three other buildings designed by Held — Amman, San Marco and Breslin — were the first apartment homes designed for middle and upper class tenants. However, there was still a stigma against apartment homes for middle and upper class residents, so early designs that of the Knickerbocker took on the appearance of a grand hotel or exclusive club to help disguise their true purpose.

When the building opened in 1911 it was hailed as the grandest apartment home in the city, and its units rented for higher prices than any others in Spokane. Residents had access to an in-house porter, chef and servants, for whom there were quarters in the building.

By the end of the 20th century and start of the 21st, however, the building had lost its original grandeur and fell into disrepair. Graffiti marked the outside walls and squatters lived inside them. In 2010, owners Eric and Mary Braden took over and began renovating the building. Additional resources for preservation were allocated in 2015 when the building was named to the Spokane Historic Register. That same year, the Bradens were honored by Spokane Preservation Advocates with an award honoring their restoration and preservation work on Knickerbocker. The Bradens sold Knickerbocker to local developer Rob Brewster in 2018 for $2.7 million.

== Description ==
Knickerbocker is a three-story, H-shaped building made of red brick with terra cotta trim. There are two courtyards inside the wings of the H-shape. The front courtyard is where the main entrance is located while the rear courtyard is a walled-off garden. The building is three stories tall plus a basement, which on the north side of the building is a daylight basement at street level due to the slope of Howard Street. The west side of the building, where the main entrance is located, has a highly embellished facade. The entrance itself is located within a portico with fluted columns of the Ionic order. The north face, along Fifth Avenue, also has a highly embellished facade. A cream colored terra cotta basement level with daylight windows extends along Fifth Avenue with red brick and terra cotta embellishment above. There are recessed balconies on the first, second and third stories which are flanked by, on the second and third stories, oriel windows which match those facing the front courtyard on the west face. The east face, part of which abuts an adjacent apartment building, and the south face, which looks out upon an alley, are plain red brick with little embellishment.

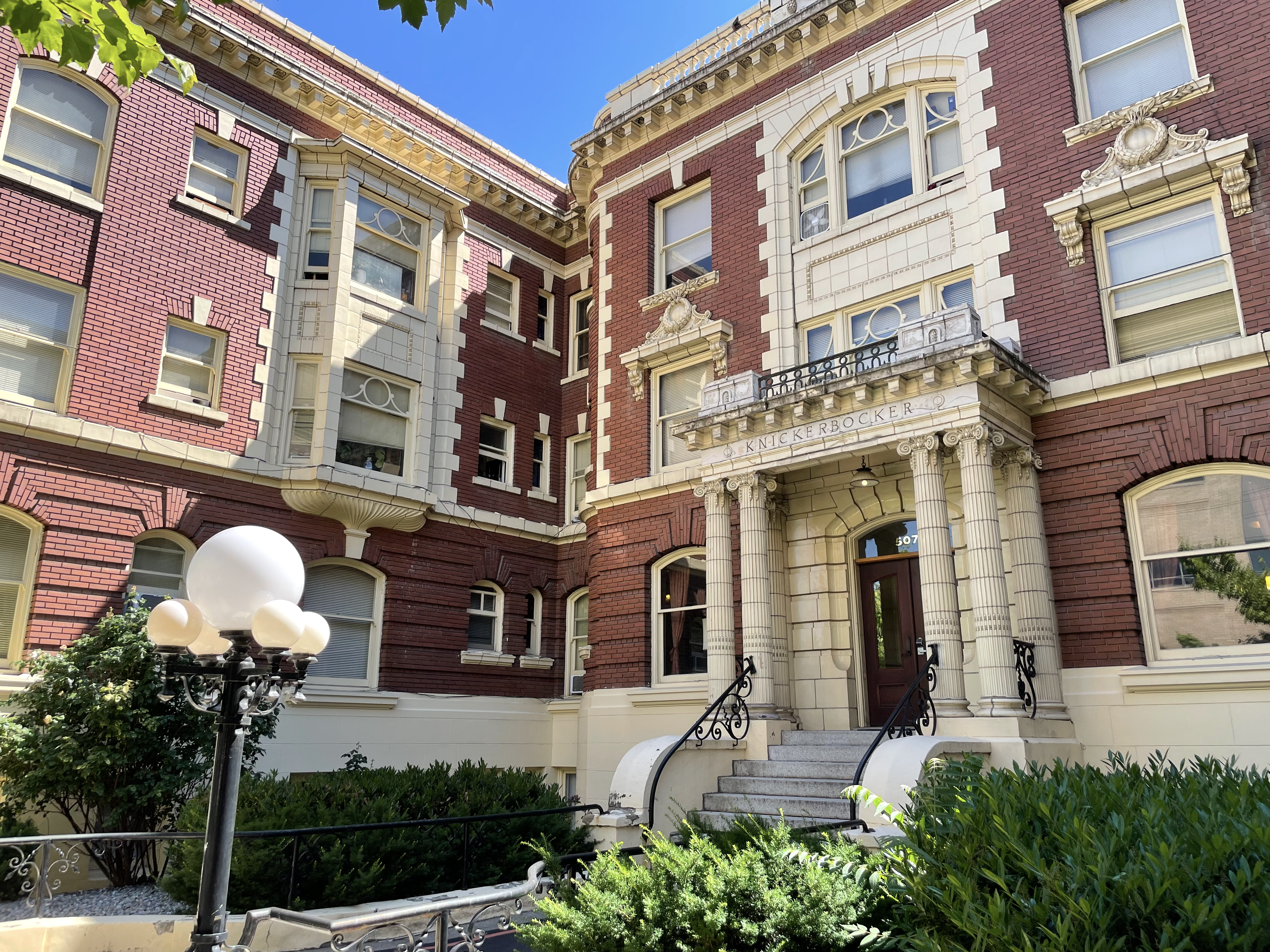
Detail view of the main entrance

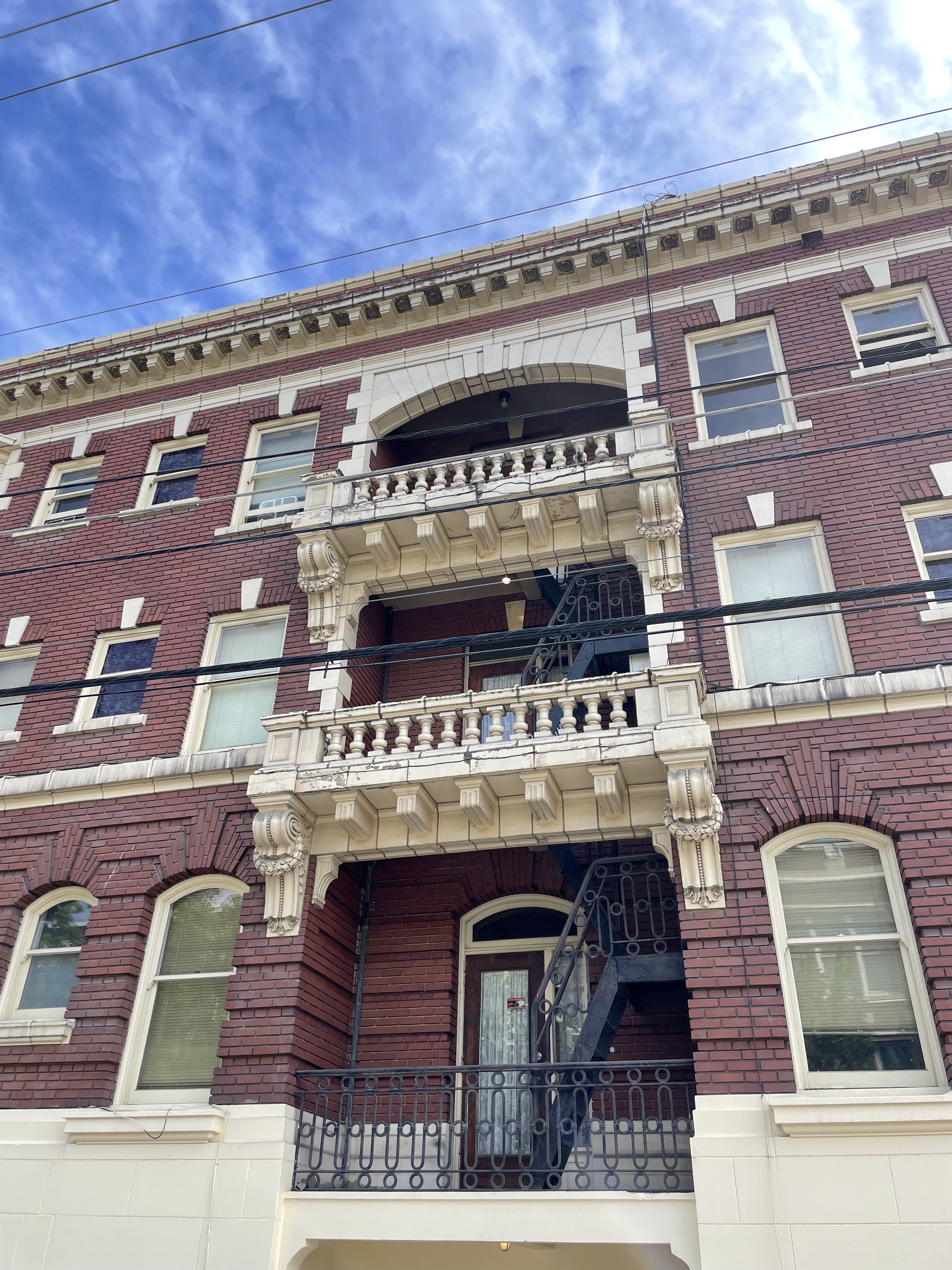
Balconies and fire escape on the north face

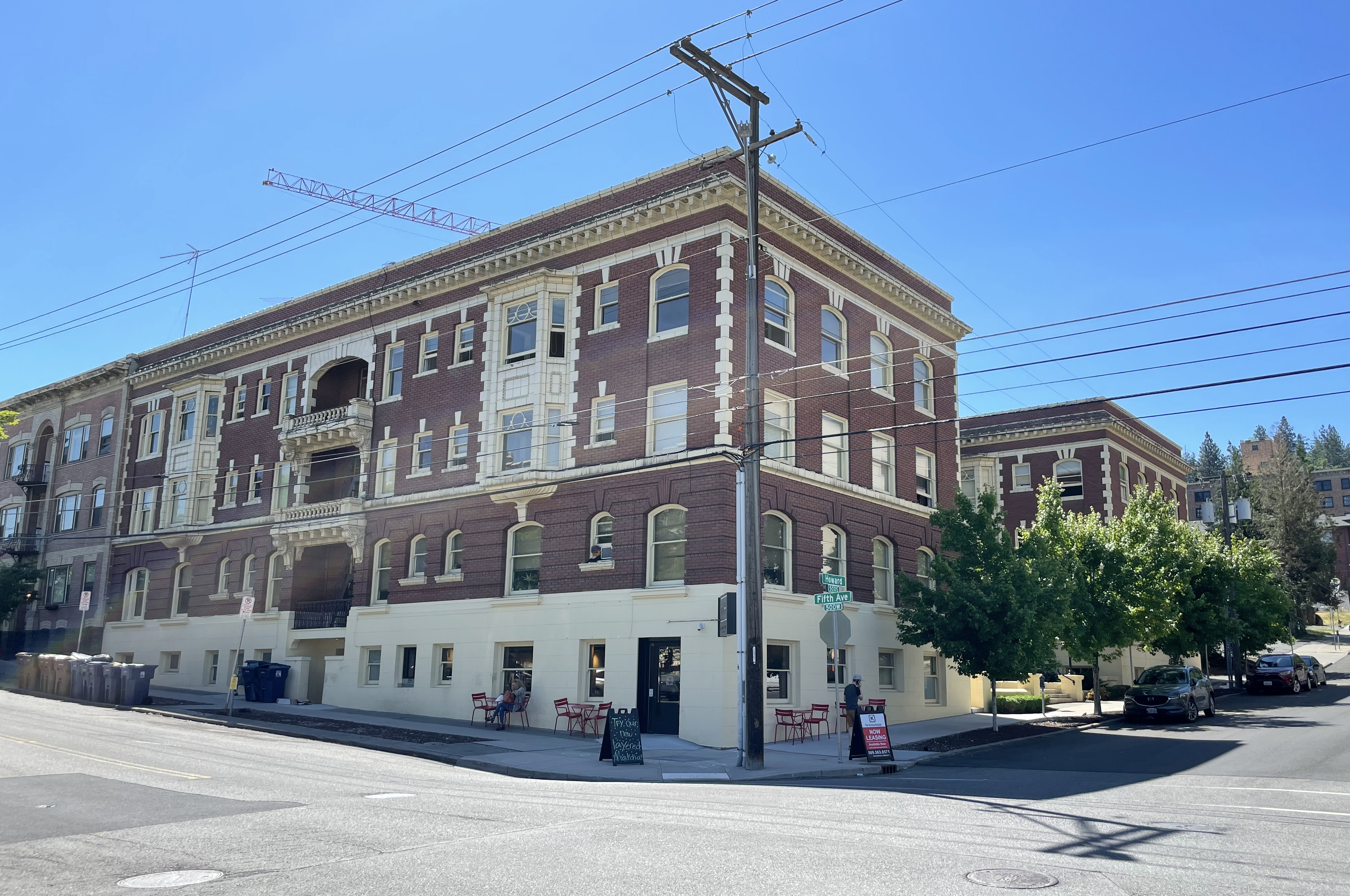
Broad view of Knickerbocker from the northwest
