= Spokane City Hall Building =

- U.S. National Register of Historic Places
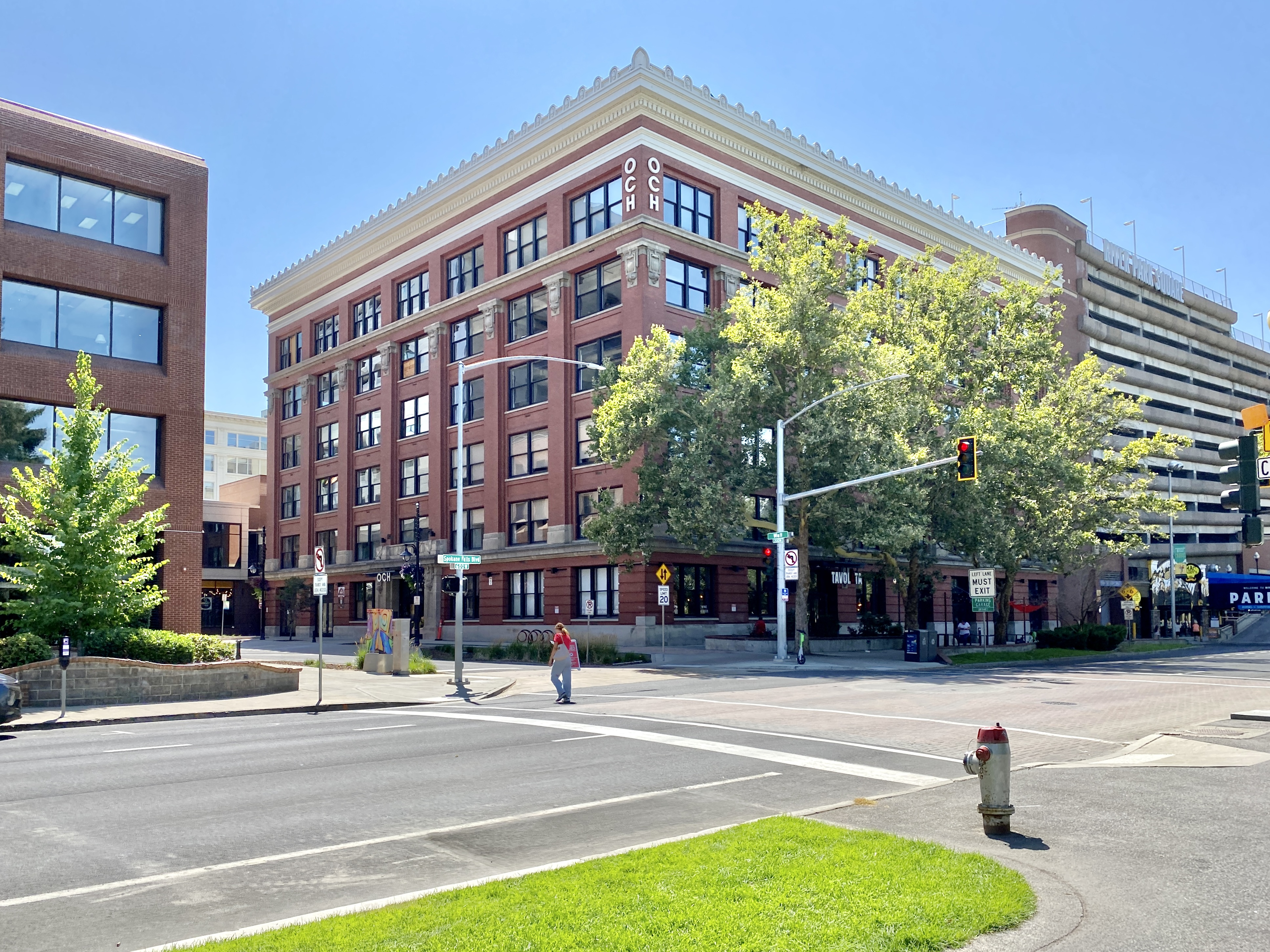
- The building in 2023

- Location within Spokane riverfront area
- Location: North 221 Wall Street and West 711 Spokane Falls Blvd., Spokane, Washington
- Coordinates: 47°39′35″N 117°25′18″W
- Area: less than one acre
- Built: 1912
- Architect: Julius Zittel
- Architectural style: Chicago, Commercial Style
- NRHP reference No.: 85000350
- Added to NRHP: February 21, 1985

The Spokane City Hall Building is a historic building in Spokane, Washington, United States. It was designed by German-born architect Julius Zittel, and built in 1912. It was used as Spokane's city hall until 1982, when it was replaced with new offices in a former Montgomery Ward department store. The old city hall was listed on the National Register of Historic Places on February 21, 1985.

On April 29, 1996, the Spokane City Hall Building was bombed by white supremacist terrorists Chevie Kehoe and Daniel Lewis Lee, damaging the building. The pipe bomb did not hurt or kill anyone since nobody was present.
