= Spokane Public Library - North Monroe Branch =

- Spokane Public Library
- U.S. National Register of Historic Places
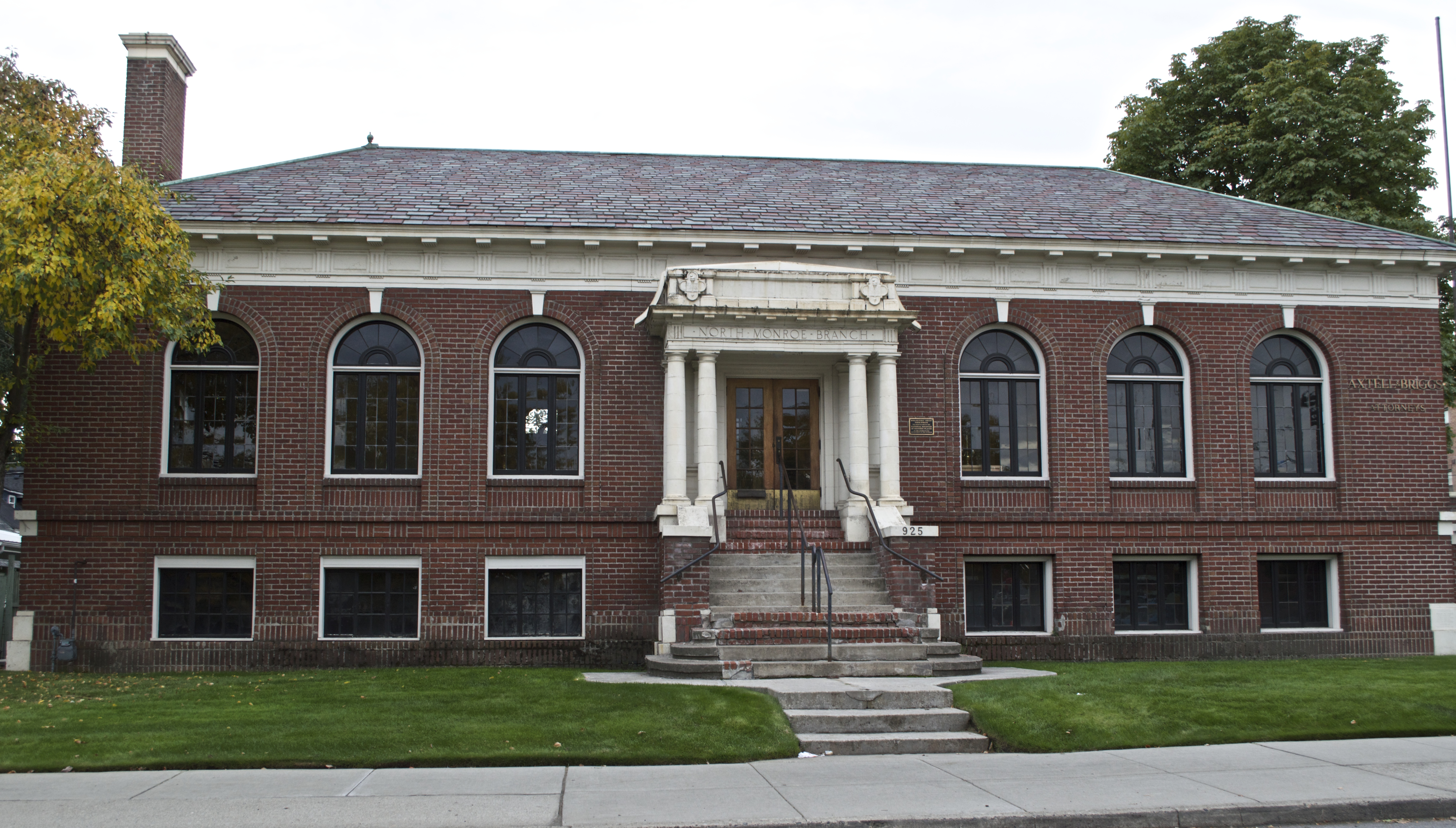
- The building in 2014

- Location within Washington (state) Location within the United States
- Location: 925 West Montgomery Street, Spokane, Washington
- Coordinates: 47°40′42″N 117°25′31″W
- Area: less than one acre
- Built: 1914
- Architect: Albert Held
- MPS: Carnegie Libraries of Washington TR
- NRHP reference No.: 82004292
- Added to NRHP: August 3, 1982

The Spokane Public Library - North Monroe Branch is a historic building in the Emerson/Garfield neighborhood of Spokane, Washington. It was designed by Albert Held, and built in 1914 with $17,500 from Andrew Carnegie. It has been listed on the National Register of Historic Places since August 3, 1982.
