= Spokane Public Library - East Side Branch =

- Spokane Public Library
- U.S. National Register of Historic Places
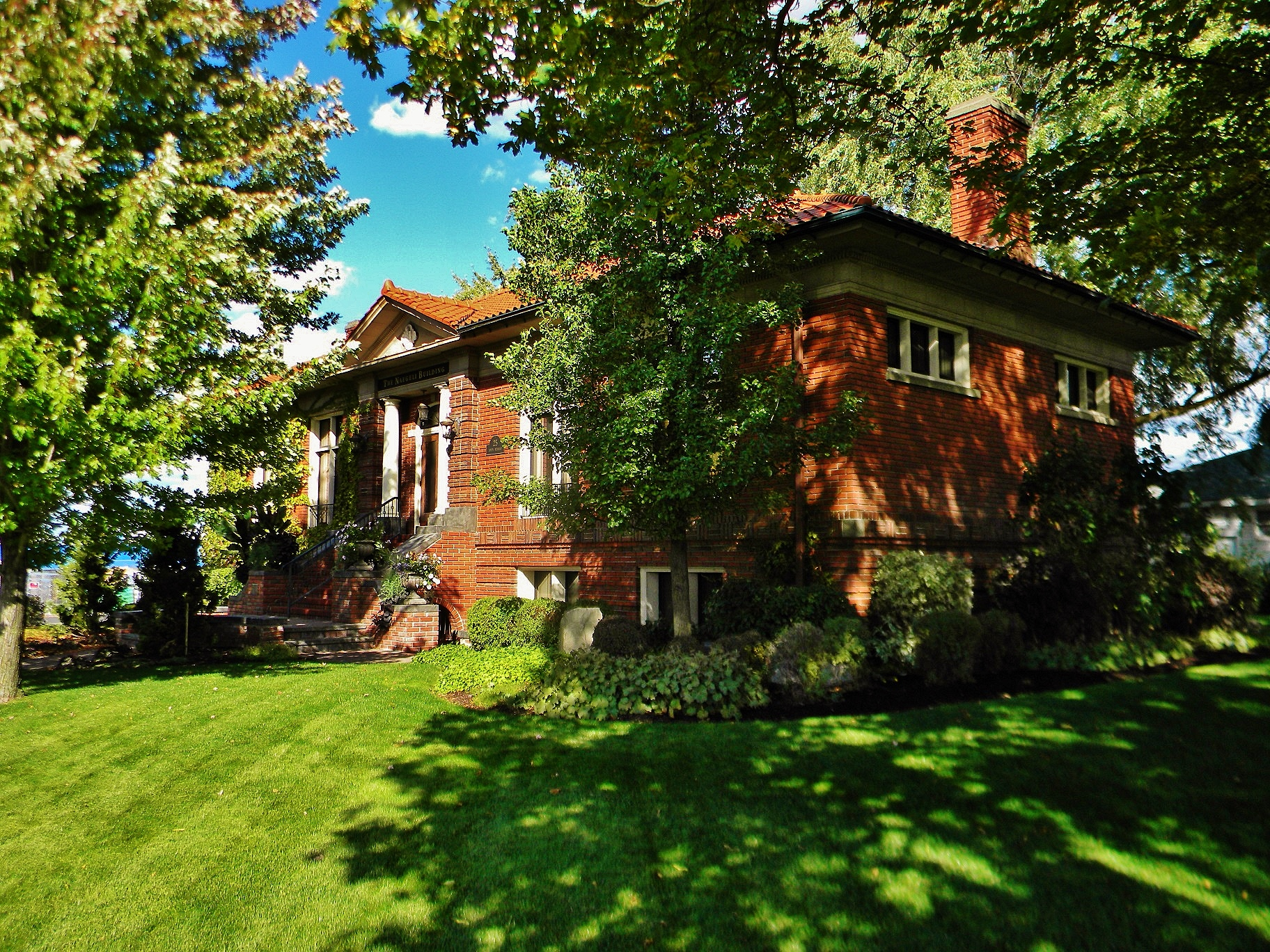
- The building in 2016

- Location within Washington (state) Location within the United States
- Location: 25 Altamont Street, Spokane, Washington
- Coordinates: 47°39′24″N 117°22′26″W
- Area: less than one acre
- Built: 1913
- Architect: Albert Held
- MPS: Carnegie Libraries of Washington TR
- NRHP reference No.: 82004290
- Added to NRHP: August 3, 1982

The Spokane Public Library - East Side Branch is a historic building in East Central, Spokane, Washington. It was designed by architect Albert Held, and built in 1913 with a donation from Andrew Carnegie. It was used as a library until 1980. It has been listed on the National Register of Historic Places since August 3, 1982.
