= Otis Hotel =

- U.S. National Register of Historic Places
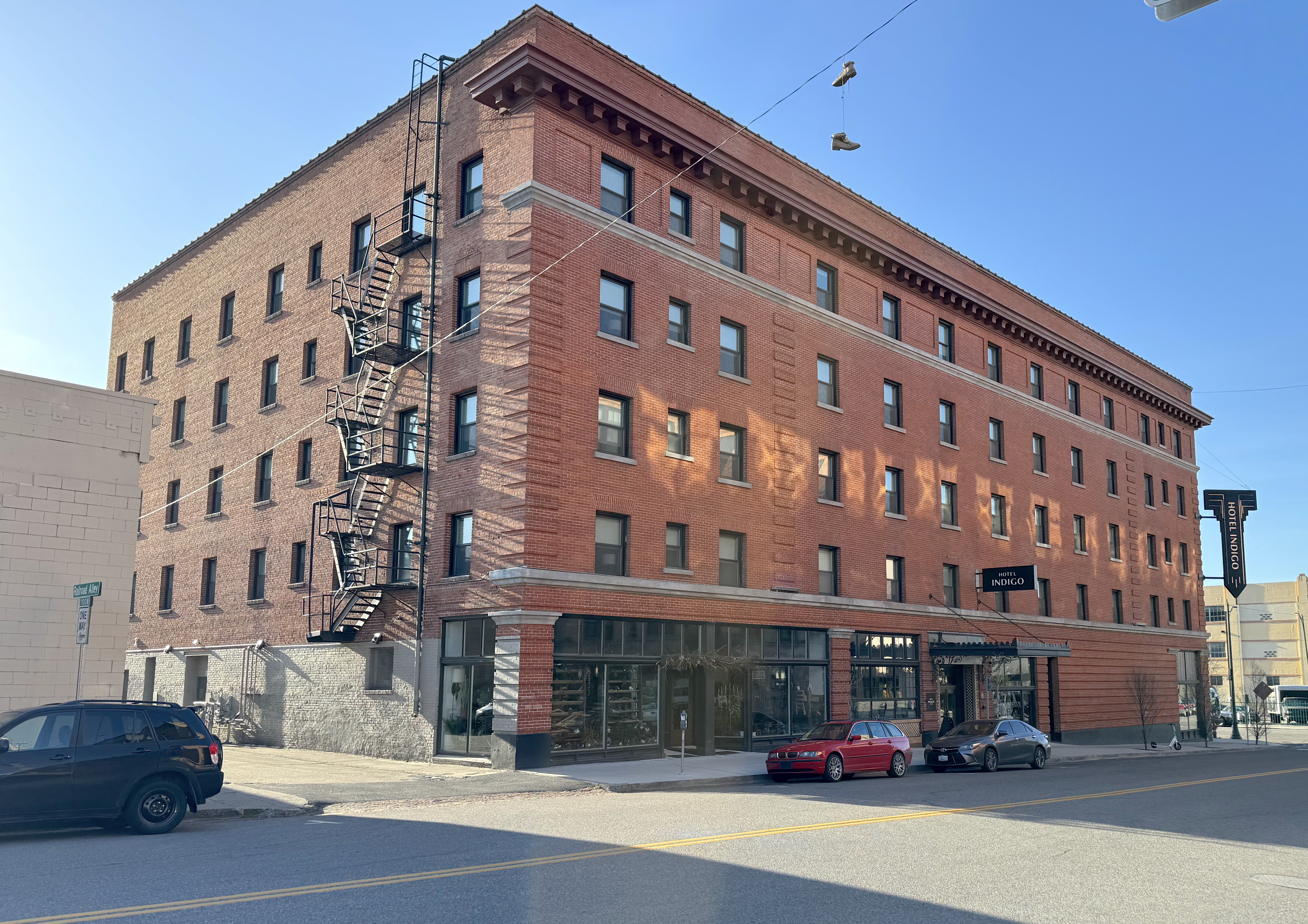
- The building in 2025

- Location within Spokane riverfront area
- Location: 1101-1109 West First, Spokane, Washington
- Coordinates: 47°39′23″N 117°25′42″W
- Area: less than one acre
- Built: 1911
- Architect: Arthur W. Cowley & Archibald G. Rigg
- Architectural style: Early Commercial
- Website: Hotel Indigo Spokane Downtown
- MPS: Single Room Occupancy Hotels in Central Business District of Spokane MPS
- NRHP reference No.: 98001227
- Added to NRHP: October 2, 1998

The Otis Hotel, also known as the Hotel Indigo Spokane Downtown, is a historic five-story building in Spokane, Washington. It was designed by Arthur W. Cowley and Archibald G. Rigg, and built in 1911 for Dr. Joseph E. Gandy. The single room occupancy (SRO) was first known as the Willard Hotel, and later through ownership changes as the Atlantic Hotel, the Earle Hotel, and then the Otis Hotel in 1956. It has been listed on the National Register of Historic Places since October 2, 1998. The building is also listed as a contributing property to the NRHP's West Downtown Historic Transportation Corridor.

After the completion of a $15 million renovation to convert the building from low income apartments back into a hotel in early 2020, the building was reopened as the Hotel Indigo Spokane and is part of the InterContinental Hotels Group.

== History ==
Commissioned by Dr. Joseph E. Gandy the Otis Hotel was built in 1911. Gandy was one of Spokane's early civic leaders. After arriving in 1880, he became the first president of the Spokane City Council and helped finance numerous building projects in Downtown Spokane. The building was designed by Arthur W. Cowley and Archibald G. Rigg, the latter of whom was a noted Canadian-American architect who was a prolific designer in the Northwestern United States.

Upon completion, the building was originally known as the Willard Hotel. Built as a single room occupancy facility to house migrant workers who at the time were a large factor in Spokane's workforce. It was one of a number of similar hotels constructed along this stretch of First Avenue to serve the same population, which contributes to its inclusion of the wider West Downtown Historic Transportation Corridor historic district. These workers were largely transient members of the community, traveling to work in construction as cities around the American West experienced building booms during the late-1800s and early-1900s.

Spokane hotelier Victor Dessert took over ownership in 1921 and changed the name from the Willard Hotel to the Atlantic Hotel, a compliment to another one of Dessert's properties, the Pacific Hotel. The Great Depression of the 1930s saw Spokane, like the rest of the country, fall upon hard economic times, which brought cheap lodging back into high demand. The Willard Hotel name was shortlived, as by 1941 the name had been changed to the Milner Hotel. By 1948 the name had been changed once more, this time to the Earle Hotel. In 1946, the commonly known Otis Hotel name had been applied to the property. During this period, as the United States experienced economic recovery, coupled with the slowdown of the building boom that had expanded Spokane during the early decades of the 20th century, the Otis Hotel's clientele changed from migrant workers to elderly, physically challenged and low-income tenants who would often reside in the hotel for extended stays due to its low rates.

During the final decades of the 20th century, the Otis Hotel became a symbol of urban decay in Spokane's city center. By the mid-1990s, the Otis Hotel and its immediate surroundings were home to over 400 people paying rents of as low as $140 per month to live in the former single room occupancy units. Local daily newspaper The Spokesman-Review referred to the area as "litter-strewn" and considered it to be the "most dangerous" area of the city center. Despite its reputation as a representation of urban decay, the building itself maintained its appearance and historic significance and was listed on the National Register of Historic Places in 1998. The Otis Hotel continued to serve as low-income housing until 2007 when the property was purchased by an investment firm and residents were removed, after which it was left vacant for more than a decade.

In June of 2017, investor Curtis Rystadt purchased the property with the intention of converting the derelict structure into a boutique hotel. Estimates for the renovation effort were placed at $6 million. It was reopened as the 108-room Hotel Indigo in July of 2020.

== Description ==
=== Setting ===
The Otis Hotel is located at the intersection of West First Avenue and South Madison Street in Downtown Spokane, Washington. It is a contributing property to the West Downtown Historic Transportation Corridor, an NRHP-listed historic district that stretches along First Avenue from Post Street in the east to Walnut Street in the west, straddling elevated railroad tracks that run behind the building and extending south to Second Avenue.

=== Architecture ===
Designed by architects Arthur W. Cowley and Archibald G. Rigg is a red brick-clad, wood-frame Commercial Style building that rises five stories above a poured concrete foundation. The two primary facades face north and east, along First Avenue and Madison Street respectively. The south and west faces of the building front along Railroad Alley and adjacent structures. They are not as visible as the other two sides, and are lacking the decorative elements of the main facades.

The primary facades feature a parapet atop the building, beneath which runs a metal block cornice. Windows along all sides are evenly spaced, though directly below the fifth story windows runs a gray concrete string course. Another similar gray concrete string course runs below the second story windows. Street level windows run along most of the first floor, from almost floor to ceiling. There are multiple storefront entries on the east and north sides, with the main entrance to the hotel in the center of the east facade. Storefront entries are recessed into the building and the hotel entrance features a black metal canopy supported by chains. The northeast corner of the building long featured a sign advertising the Otis Hotel, that has subsequently been replaced by one for the Hotel Indigo.

Along the south and west sides of the building, the ornamentation from the primary facades is missing though the windows are the same metal-hung style as on the other two sides. From the primary facades the building appears rectangular, but two air and light corridors that cut into the west side of the building give it the appearance of a block "W" from above. These openings are broken up at floor level on third, fourth and fifth stories by brick arches capped with sills. The northern half of the building, including the north air and light corridor below the fifth story, is not visible due to the adjacent Commercial Hotel building, which directly abuts the Otis Hotel along First Avenue.

== Gallery ==
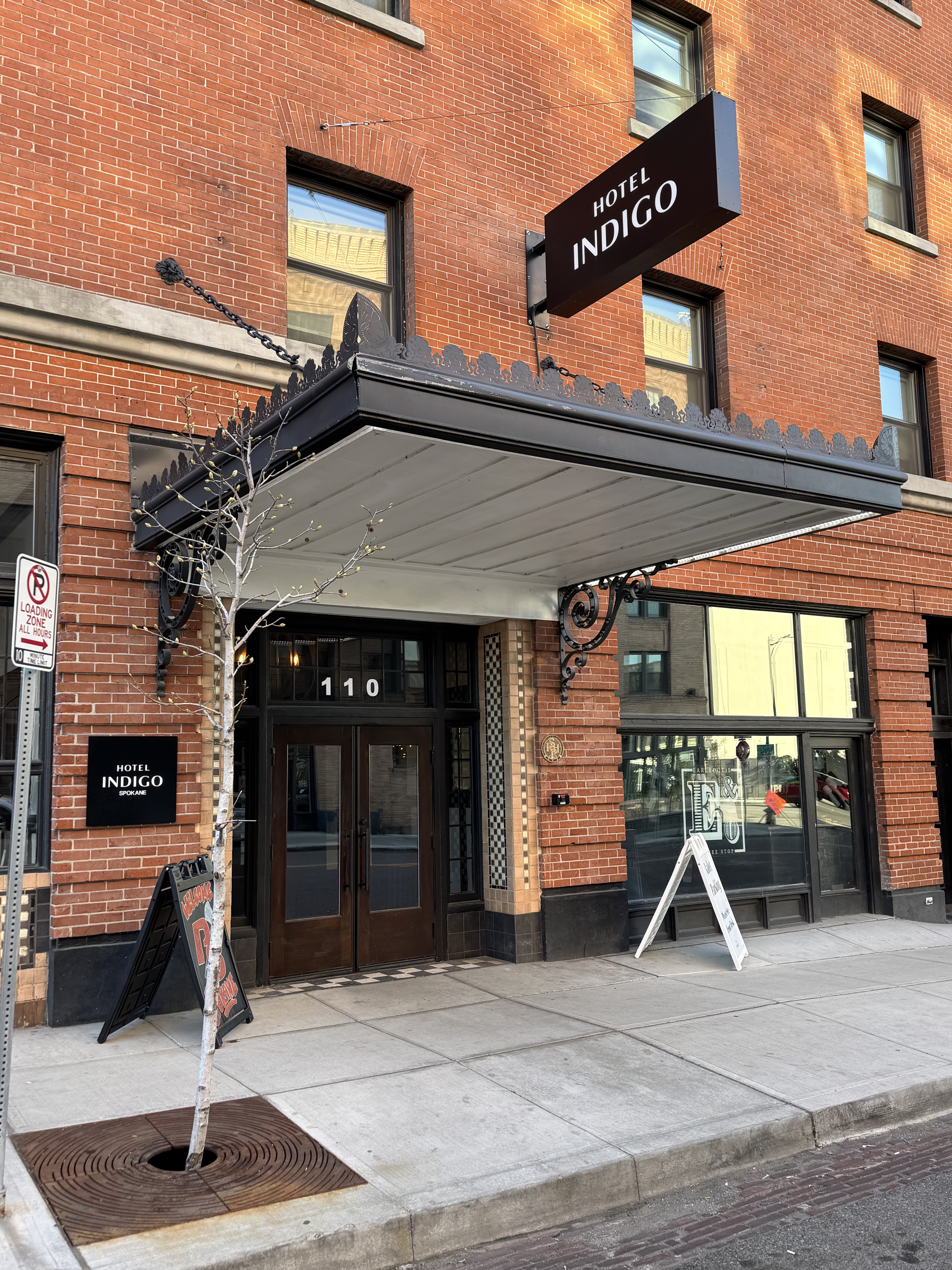
Main entrance

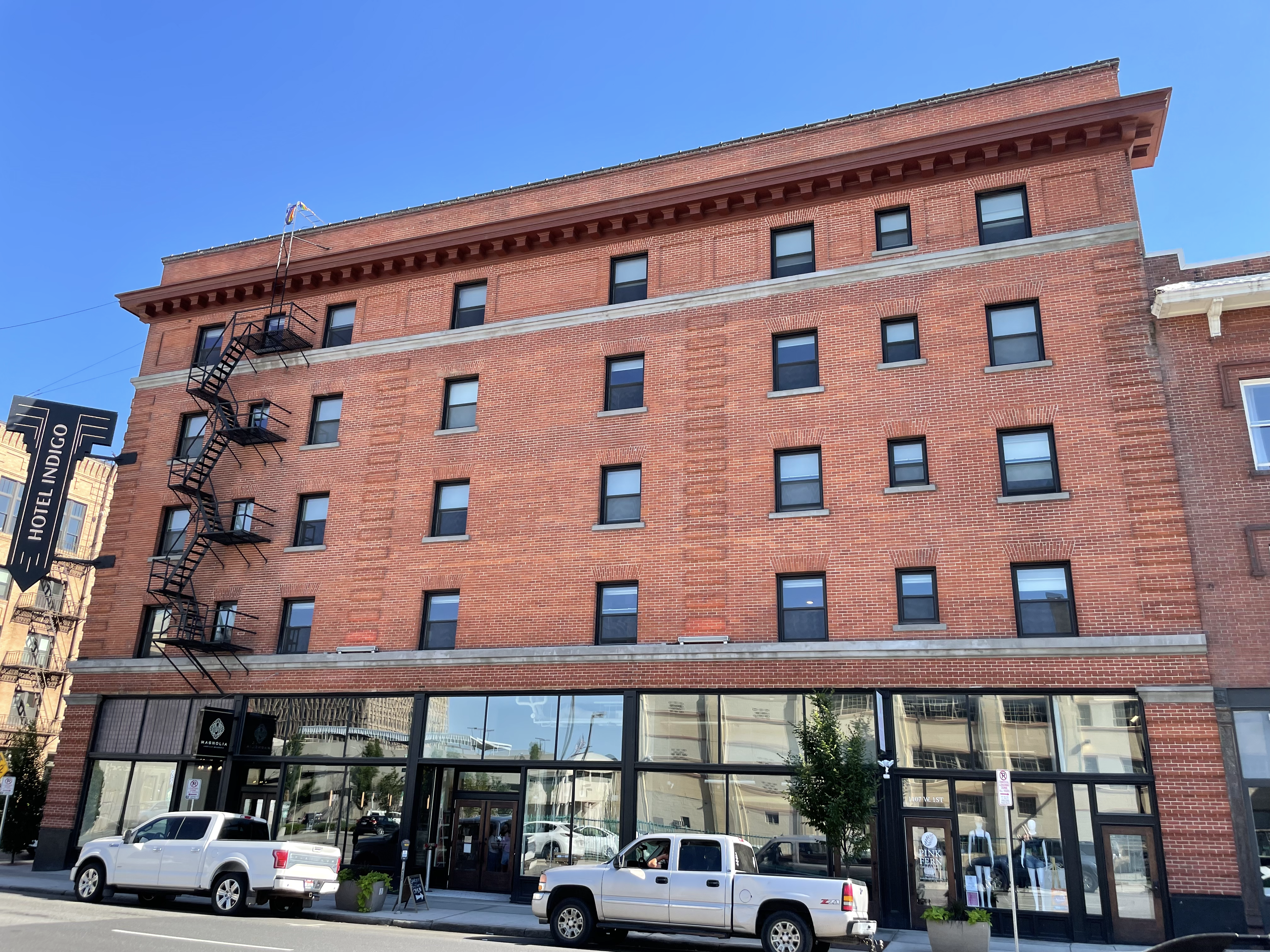
North facade

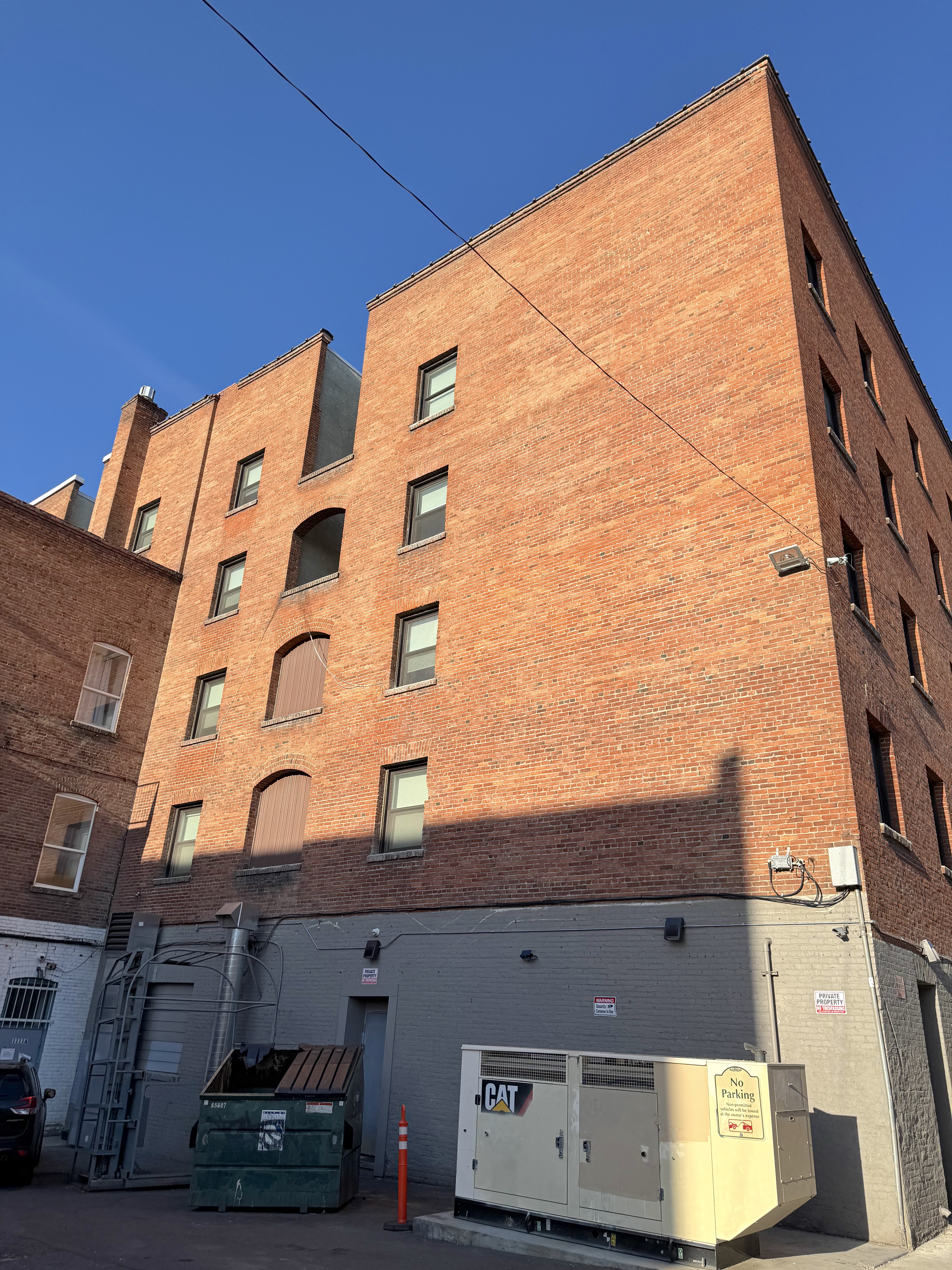
Rear facade
