= Seehorn-Lang Building =

- U.S. National Register of Historic Places
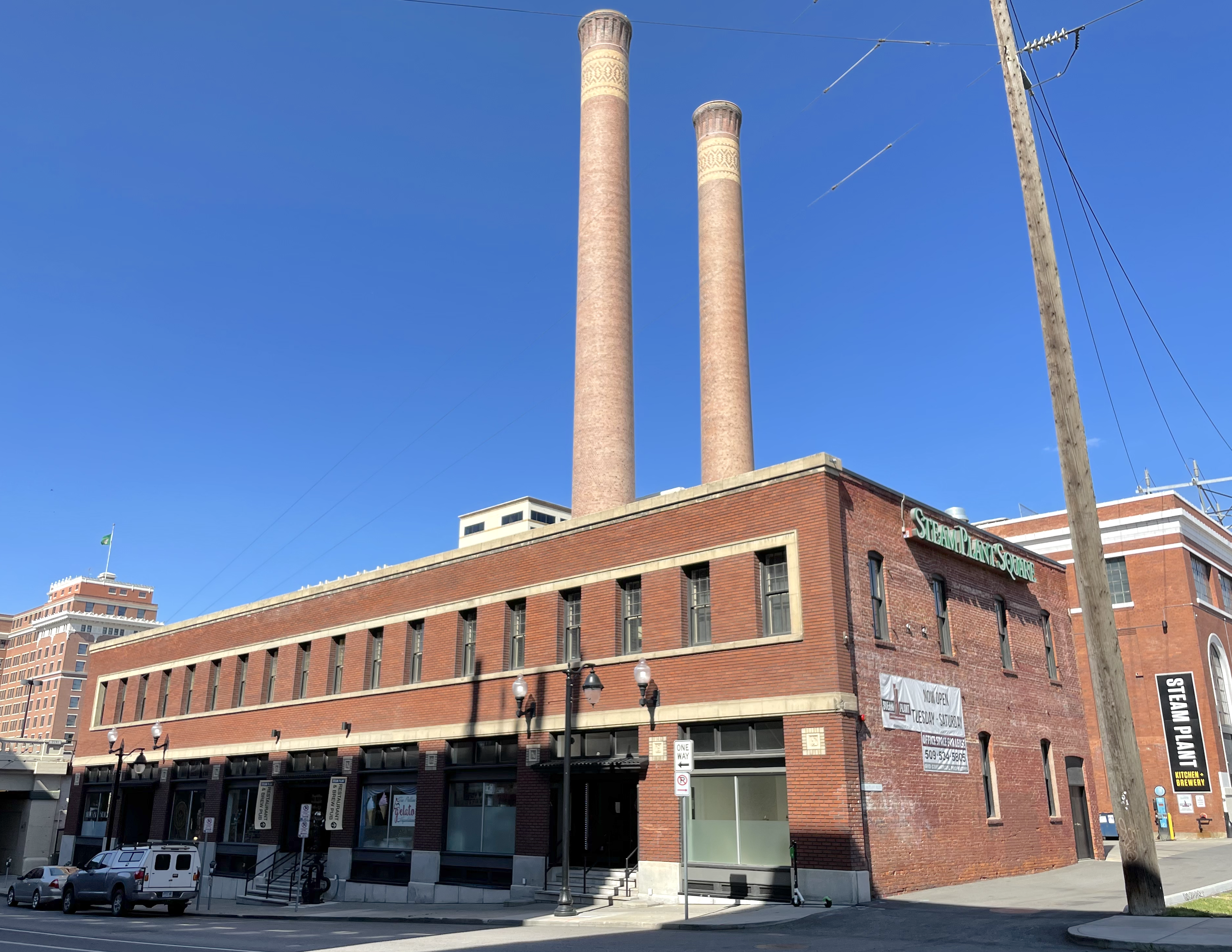

- Location within Spokane riverfront area
- Location: 165 S. Lincoln St., Spokane, Washington
- Coordinates: 47°39′19″N 117°25′29″W
- Area: less than one acre
- Built: 1890
- Architectural style: Commercial Style
- NRHP reference No.: 97001674
- Added to NRHP: January 23, 1998

The Seehorn-Lang Building is a historic building in Downtown Spokane, Washington. Since the late 1990s it has been commonly known as part of Steam Plant Square, a commercial and retail center which it forms together with the adjacent Central Steam Heat Plant building. Built in 1890, it is one of the oldest buildings in Spokane, as many buildings constructed prior were destroyed in the Great Spokane Fire of 1889. The building is listed on the National Register of Historic Places (NRHP) as well as the state and local historic registers. Additionally, it is a contributing property in the West Downtown Historic Transportation Corridor, a historic district added to the NRHP in 1999.

== History ==
Prior to 1889, the lot on which the Seehorn-Lang Building sits was vacant. Spokane businessmen Gile O. Bump and C. W. Ide purchased the property and deeded it to the Spokane Storage Company, which built a storage structure on the site. However, the structure would quickly be replaced after the Great Spokane Fire by the brick Seehorn-Lang Building. Built in 1890, the original structure of the building was smaller than it is at present, occupying only two-thirds of its lot. Early tenants were food distributors and packing companies. By 1910, the building had been expanded north to fill nearly its entire lot.

Also in 1910, prominent early Spokane businessman Elihu "Billy" Seehorn moved his Seehorn Transfer and Storage Company into the building. Though the company would leave the building 15 years later and move a block to the east, the Seehorn-Lang Building would retain the Seehorn name in public use. The title for the property was acquired by local businessman John Lang in 1925, giving the building the second part of its hyphenated name.

When the Seehorn company moved out in 1925, alterations were made to the building. A new facade along Lincoln Street was constructed, which as of 2022 remains to this day. The interior was also renovated, converting the building into a retail sales space with nine rooms for lease. John Lang died in 1926, and ownership of the building was passed to his widow, Wilhelmina, who managed the property until her death 14 years later. At that time, in 1940, the Lang's son, Otto Lang took over ownership of the property until his death, when it then passed to his widow Mary Lang. The Lang family owned the building until 2017, when Deborah Lang-Westwood, John Lang's great-granddaughter, sold the building to Avista Utilities. Avista, through its predecessor company Washington Water Power, had owned the adjacent Central Steam Heat Plant for nearly 100 years. Avista sold both the Seehorn-Lang Building and the Steam Plant, which together form the Steam Plant Square, to Spokane developer Jerry Dicker in 2021.

== Description ==
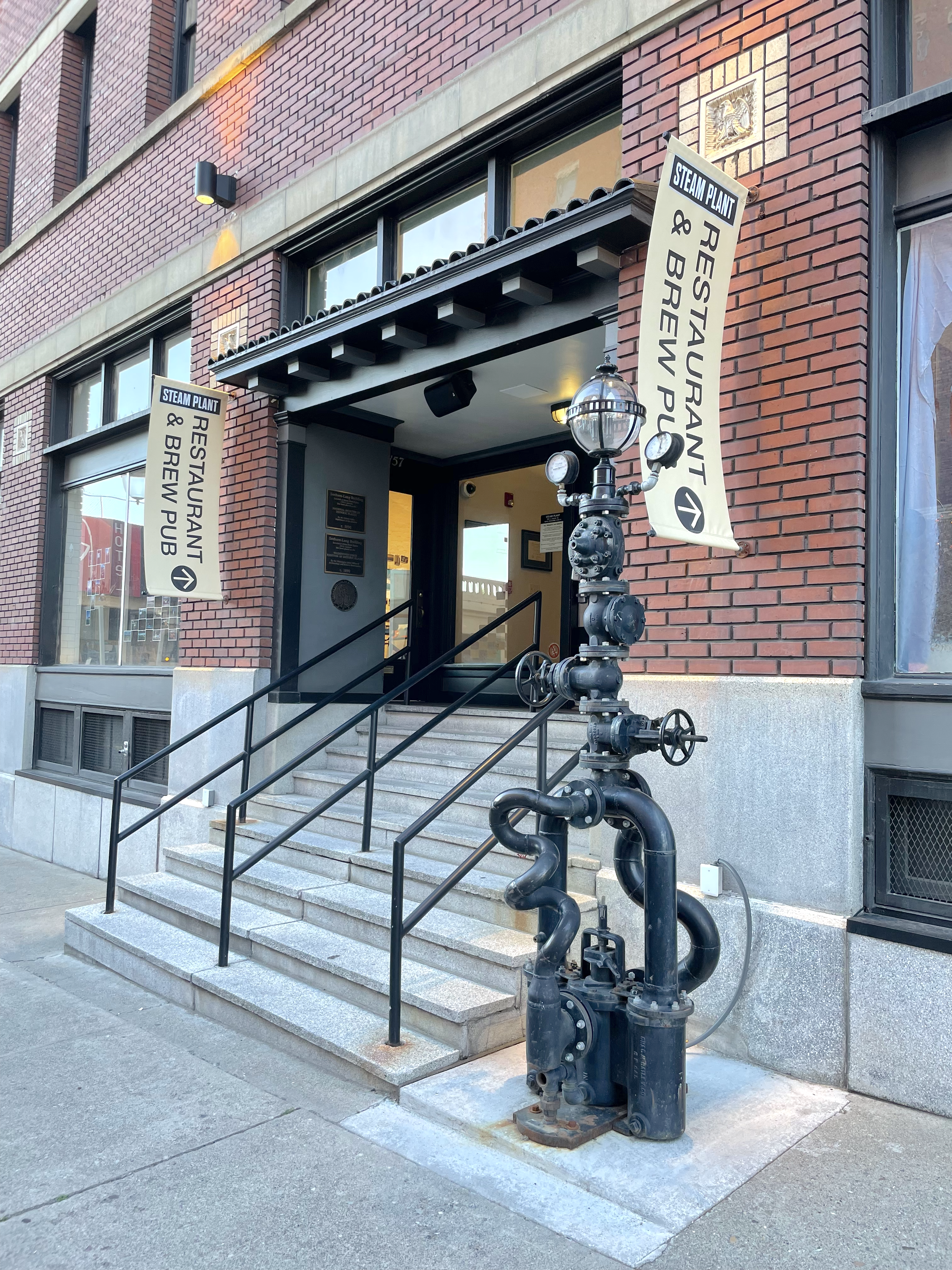
Main entrance on Lincoln Street

The Seehorn-Lang Building is located between 151 and 165 South Lincoln Street in Downtown Spokane. A raised railroad right-of-way runs along the building's northern side, with an alleyway between the two. A publicly accessible alley, Steam Plant Alley, runs along the south side of the building. Lincoln Street runs along the western side of the building, where the main entrance and storefronts are located. To the east the building is connected to the Central Steam Heat Plant, together which it forms Steam Plant Square.

The building is 50 feet deep, 137 feet long and stands two stories tall. The western facade along Lincoln Street is on a slight slope, dropping as the road goes to the north. There are three storefront entry bays along Lincoln Street. The Lincoln Street facade was constructed in 1925 with dark red brick and white concrete trim. Piers along the facade have terracotta ornamental panels near the top of the first story. The second story is lined with 18 rectangular, vertically oriented windows. Terrazzo staircases extend out from the building's three recessed entrances into the sidewalk. The lower half of the south facade was part of the original 1890 structure.

An aspect of the building's significance, beyond just its age, is that it is representative of the style of architecture from the turn of the century that once dominated the West Downtown Historic Transportation Corridor historic district. Numerous surrounding buildings in the district have been demolished or lost original street front architectural features. The Seehorn-Lang Building is the only remaining example of a 1920s-era wood-framed storefront with original windows and doors in the city's central business district. It is simultaneously a symbol of the past and an example of the area's evolution from a warehouse district into a commercial area and ultimately a cultural district known as the Davenport Arts and Entertainment District.
