= First Presbyterian Church of Whitefish =

Historic church in Montana, United States

- U.S. National Register of Historic Places
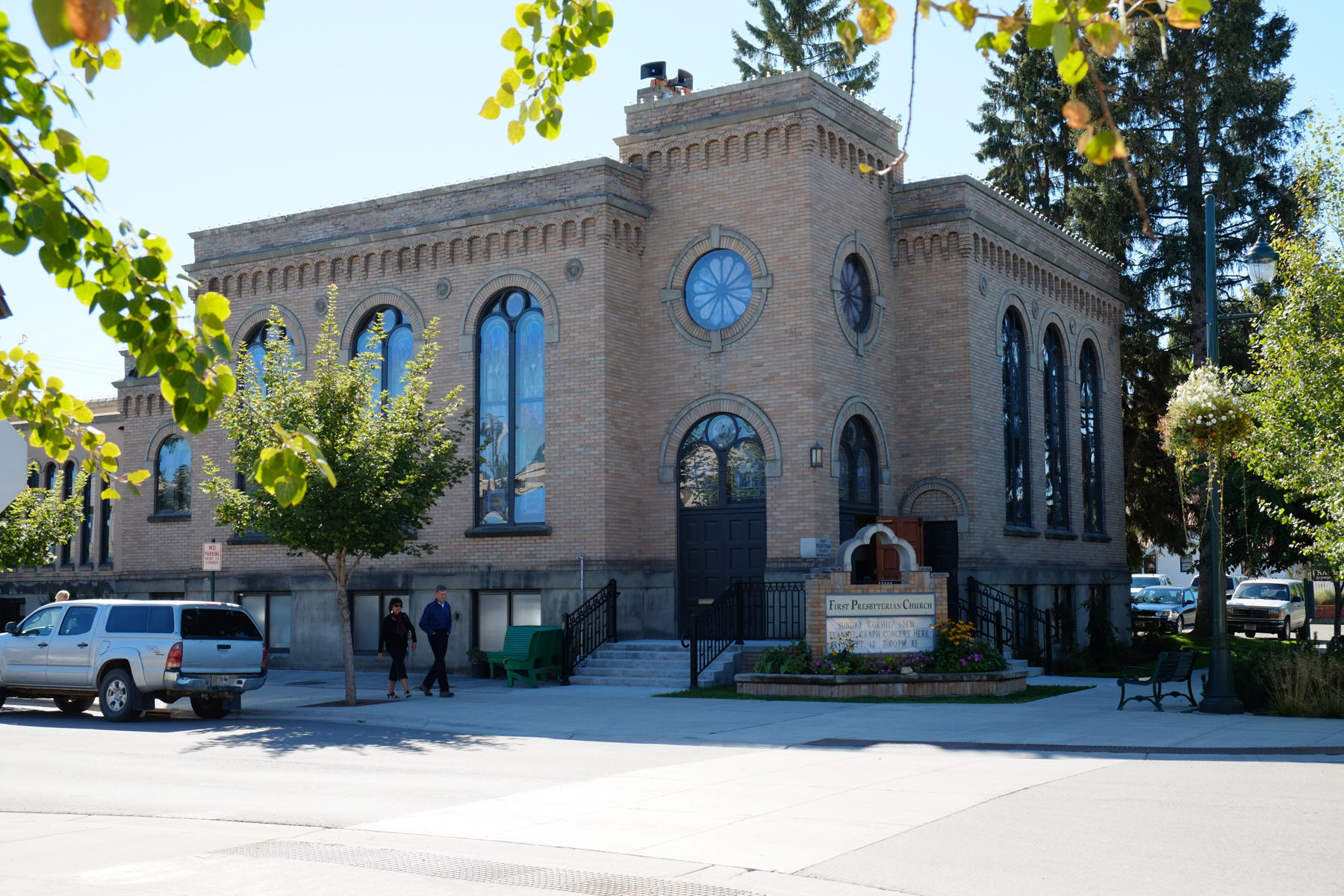

- Location within Montana Location within the United States
- Location: 301 Central Ave., Whitefish, Montana
- Coordinates: 48°24′33″N 114°20′8″W
- Area: less than one acre
- Built: 1921
- Architect: Archibald Rigg and Roland Vantyne
- Architectural style: Romanesque Revival
- NRHP reference No.: 04001085
- Added to NRHP: October 1, 2004

First Presbyterian Church of Whitefish is a historic Presbyterian church at 301 Central Avenue in Whitefish, Montana.

It was built in 1921 and added to the National Register of Historic Places in 2004.

It was deemed significant for its associations with the social history of Whitefish and from its Romanesque Revival architecture, "a fine representation of work by regional architects Rigg and Vantyne".
