= Salvation Army Building (Spokane, Washington) =

- U.S. National Register of Historic Places
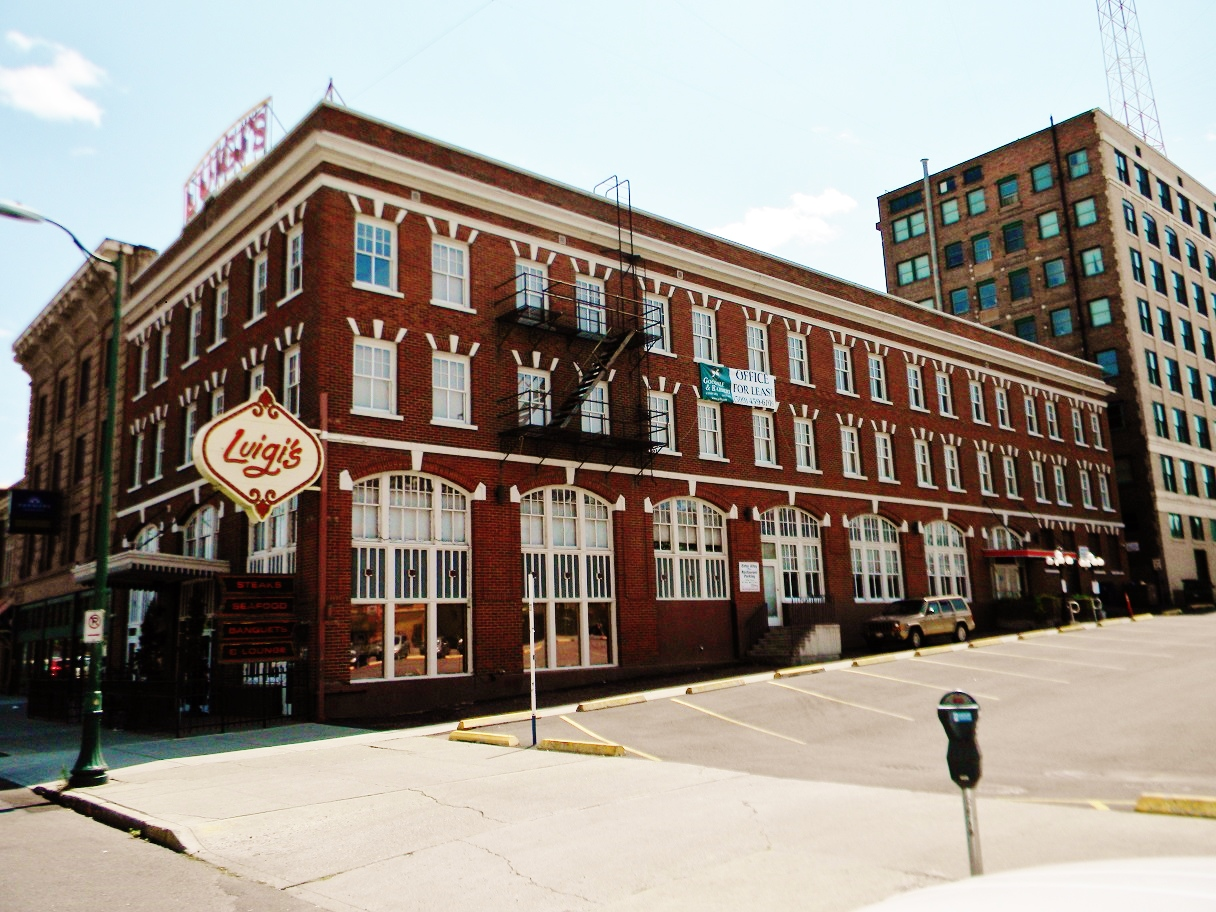
- The building in 2015

- Location within Spokane riverfront area
- Location: 245 West Main Avenue, Spokane, Washington
- Coordinates: 47°39′32″N 117°24′53″W
- Area: less than one acre
- Built: 1921
- Built by: Frederick Phair
- Architect: Archibald G. Rigg
- Architectural style: Early Commercial
- NRHP reference No.: 00001445
- Added to NRHP: November 22, 2000

The Salvation Army Building is a historic building in Spokane, Washington. It was built in 1921, and designed by Archibald G. Rigg. It belonged to The Salvation Army until 1973. It has been listed on the National Register of Historic Places since November 22, 2000.
