= Montvale Hotel =

- Montvale Block
- U.S. National Register of Historic Places
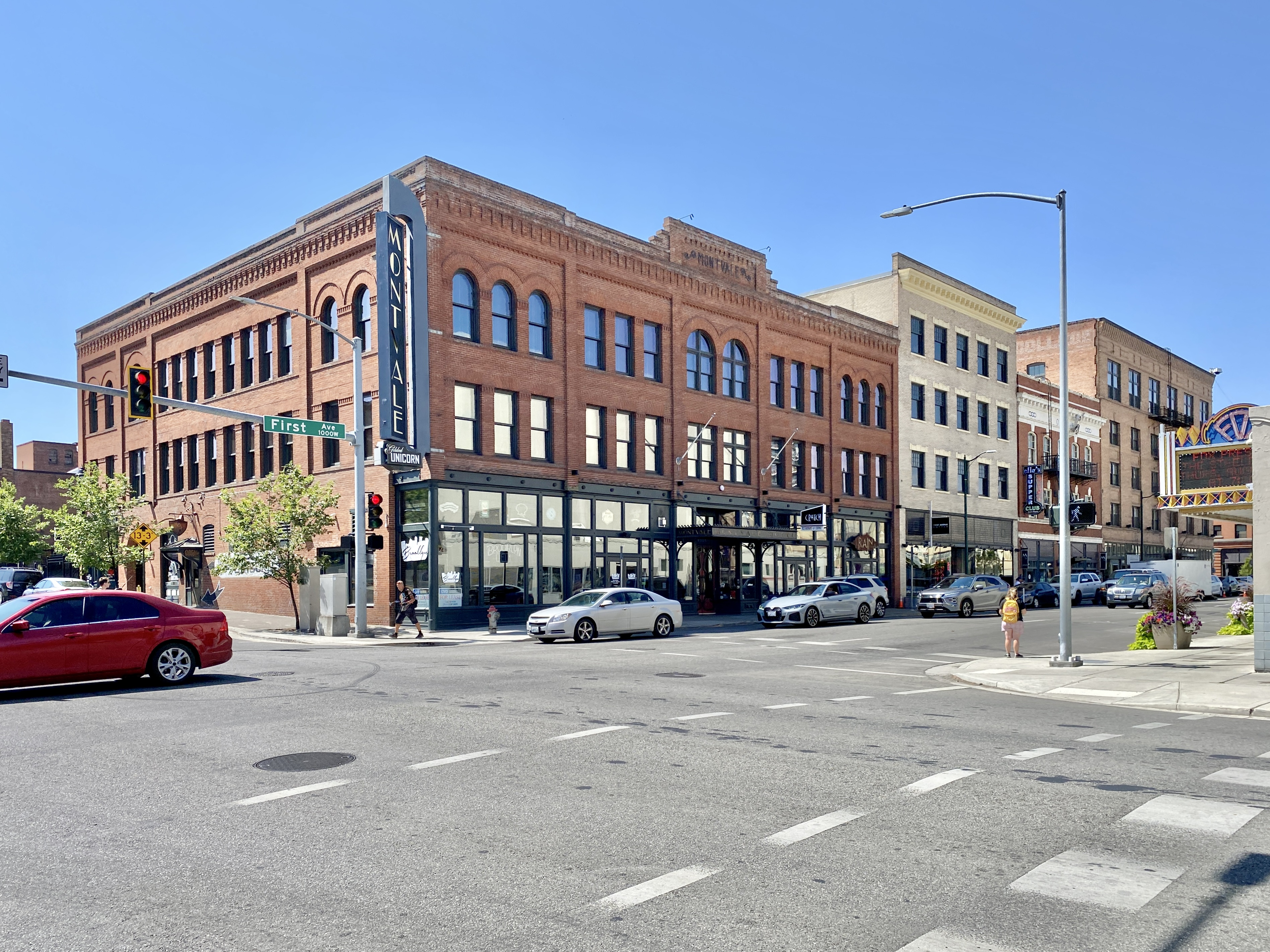
- Montvale Hotel and the Montvale Block in 2023

- Location within Spokane riverfront area
- Location: Spokane, Washington
- Coordinates: 47.6563°N 117.4269°W
- Built: 1889
- Architectural style: Early Commercial
- MPS: Single Room Occupancy Hotels in Central Business District of Spokane MPS
- NRHP reference No.: 98000369
- Added to NRHP: April 13, 1998

The Montvale Hotel is a boutique hotel in Spokane, Washington. Originally built in 1889 as an SRO (Single Room Occupancy Hotel), the Montvale Hotel also served Spokane as an apartment building, a brothel, and as a youth hostel during Expo '74 and then was abandoned for 30 years. The building is listed on the National Register of Historic Places on its own merit, and is also listed as a contributing property to the West Downtown Historic Transportation Corridor. It was restored and re-opened in January 2005 as a 36-room boutique hotel, becoming one of Spokane's premier hotels with The Davenport Hotel and the Hotel Lusso.

With the demolition of the Pennington Wing at the Davenport Hotel, the Montvale gained the distinction as Spokane's oldest hotel. Kilmer and Son's Hardware was located on buildings' main floor for over 60 years. Kilmer once employed Henry J. Kaiser.

== See also ==
- List of Historic Hotels of America
