= Roland Vantyne =

American architect

- Born: 1887
- Died: November 26, 1938 (aged 50–51); Spokane, Washington, U.S.
- Education: Buffalo Polytechnic Institute
- Occupation: Architect
- Spouse: Olga Vantyne
- Children: 2 sons

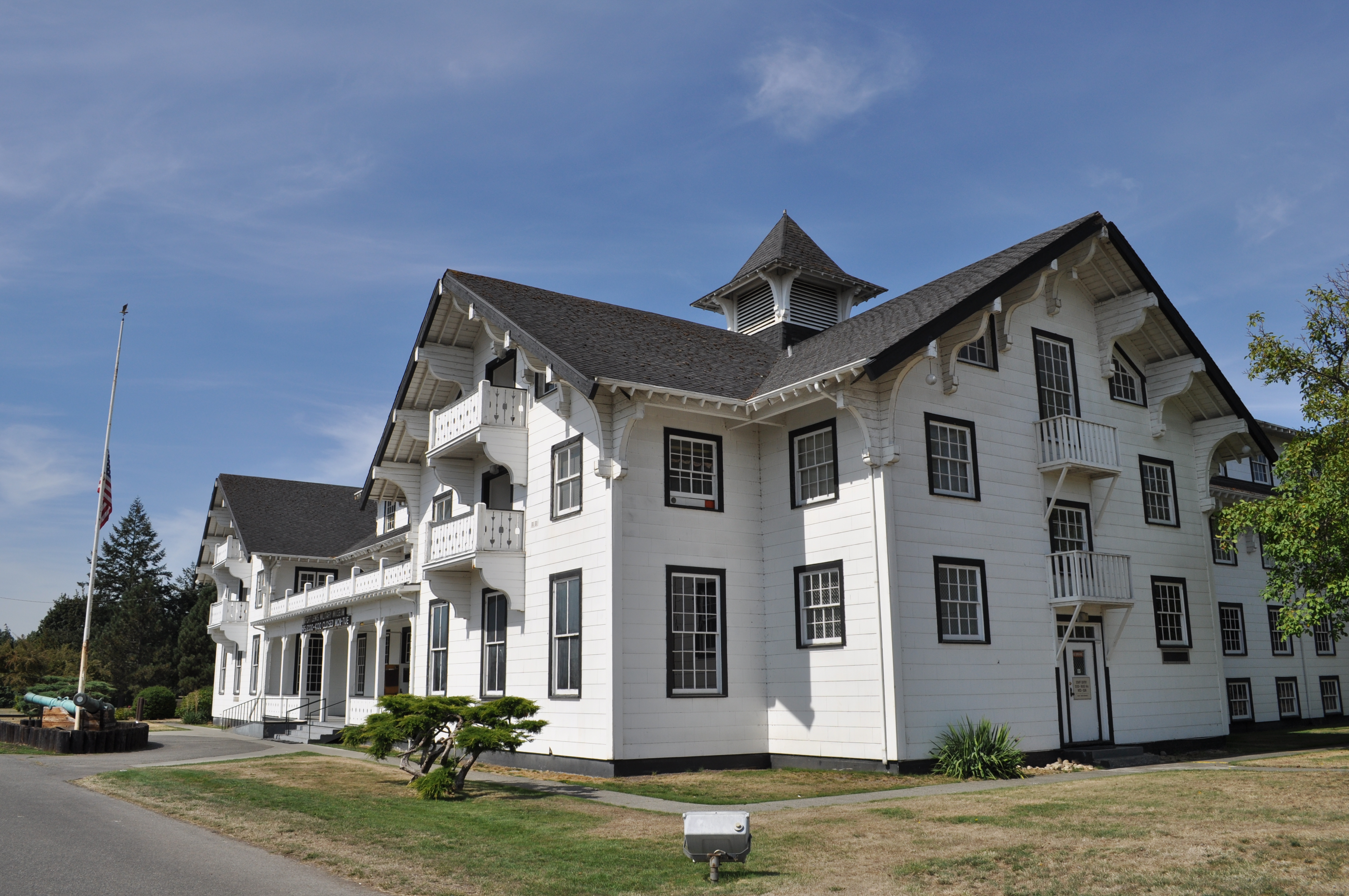
The Red Shield Inn, designed by Rigg and Vantyne.

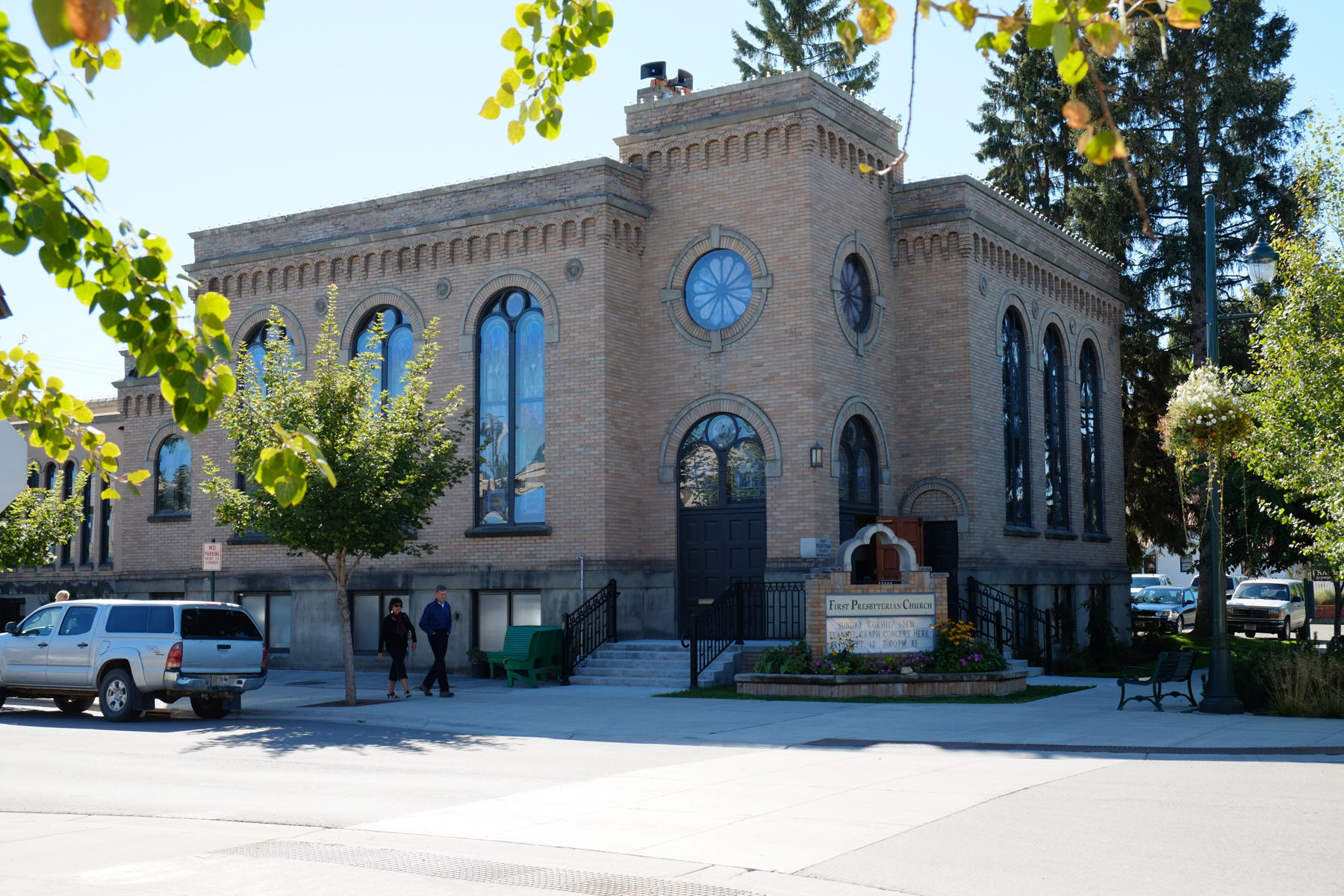
The Presbyterian Church of Whitefish, designed by Rigg and Vantyne.

Roland Vantyne (1887 - November 26, 1938) was an American architect. He attended the Buffalo Polytechnic Institute, and he was a draftsman for Albert Held and Julius Zittel. He co-founded a firm with Archibald G. Rigg in 1919, and they designed the Shriner's Hospital and Hutton Elementary School in Spokane. They designed at least two buildings listed on the National Register of Historic Places: the Red Shield Inn (now known as Lewis Army Museum) in Fort Lewis, Washington, and the First Presbyterian Church of Whitefish in Montana. Vantyne was a Rosicrucian.
