= Archibald Rigg =

New Zealand cricketer

Personal information
- Full name: Archibald Anthony Rigg
- Born: 18 April 1865; Wellington, New Zealand
- Died: 2 September 1918 (aged 53); Wellington, New Zealand

Domestic team information
- Years: Team
- 1884/85: Wellington
- Source: Cricinfo, 27 October 2020

Archibald Anthony Rigg (18 April 1865 – 2 September 1918) was a New Zealand cricketer. He played in one first-class match for Wellington during the 1884–85 season.

Rigg was born at Wellington in 1865, the son of one of the early settlers of the city. He was educated at Mount Cook High School, where he played cricket, and was employed by John Duthie and Co, an ironmongers firm in Wellington. He worked for the company for more than 33 years, travelling throughout the West Coast Region and North Island for a number of years before being promoted to the role of manager at the company's Wellington store.

A member of the Pōneke cricket and football clubs and later the Midland Cricket Club, Rigg played both rugby union and cricket. Considered a "fine cricketer" and described as "a fast bowler and a dashing batsman", his only first-class match was a January 1885 fixture against Auckland at the Basin Reserve. He scored a single run in the only innings that he batted in and did not take a wicket during the match.

After suffering from lung problems for a number of years, Rigg collapsed in June 1918 and was bed-ridden until his death in September. He was married with three children and aged 53 when he died.
