= Archibald G. Rigg =

Canadian-born American architect (1878–1959)

- Born: April 5, 1878; Stratford, Ontario, Canada
- Died: February 18, 1959 (aged 80); Spokane, Washington, US
- Education: Trinity College; Columbia University
- Occupation: Architect
- Children: 1

Archibald G. Rigg (April 5, 1878 – February 18, 1959) was a Canadian-born American architect. Over the course of his career, he designed hundreds of buildings in the Northwestern United States.

== Biography ==
Rigg was born on April 5, 1878, in Stratford, Ontario. His parents were William Rigg and Arabella (née Harvey) Rigg, immigrants from Scotland and England, respectively. He studied at Trinity College and Columbia University.

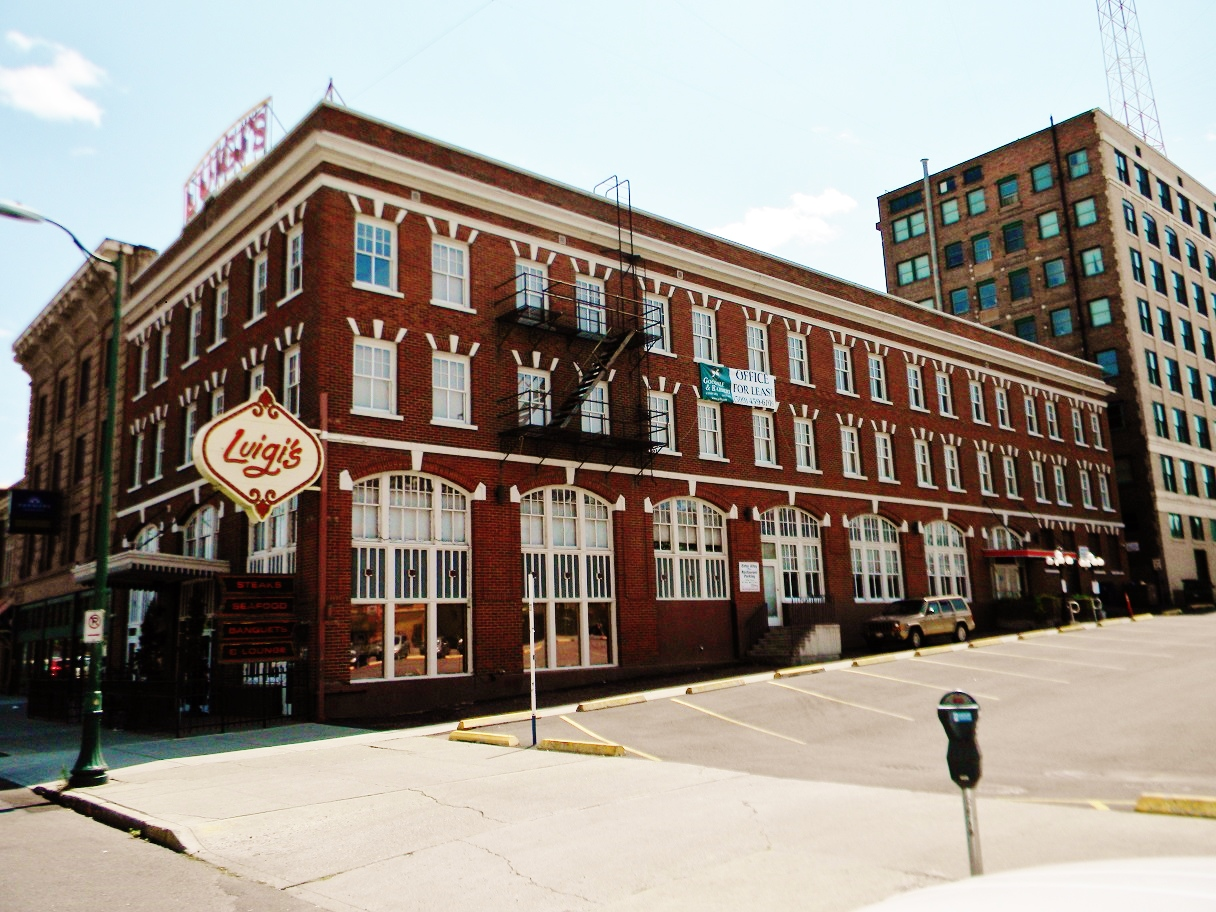
The Salvation Army Building in Spokane, Washington, designed by Rigg.

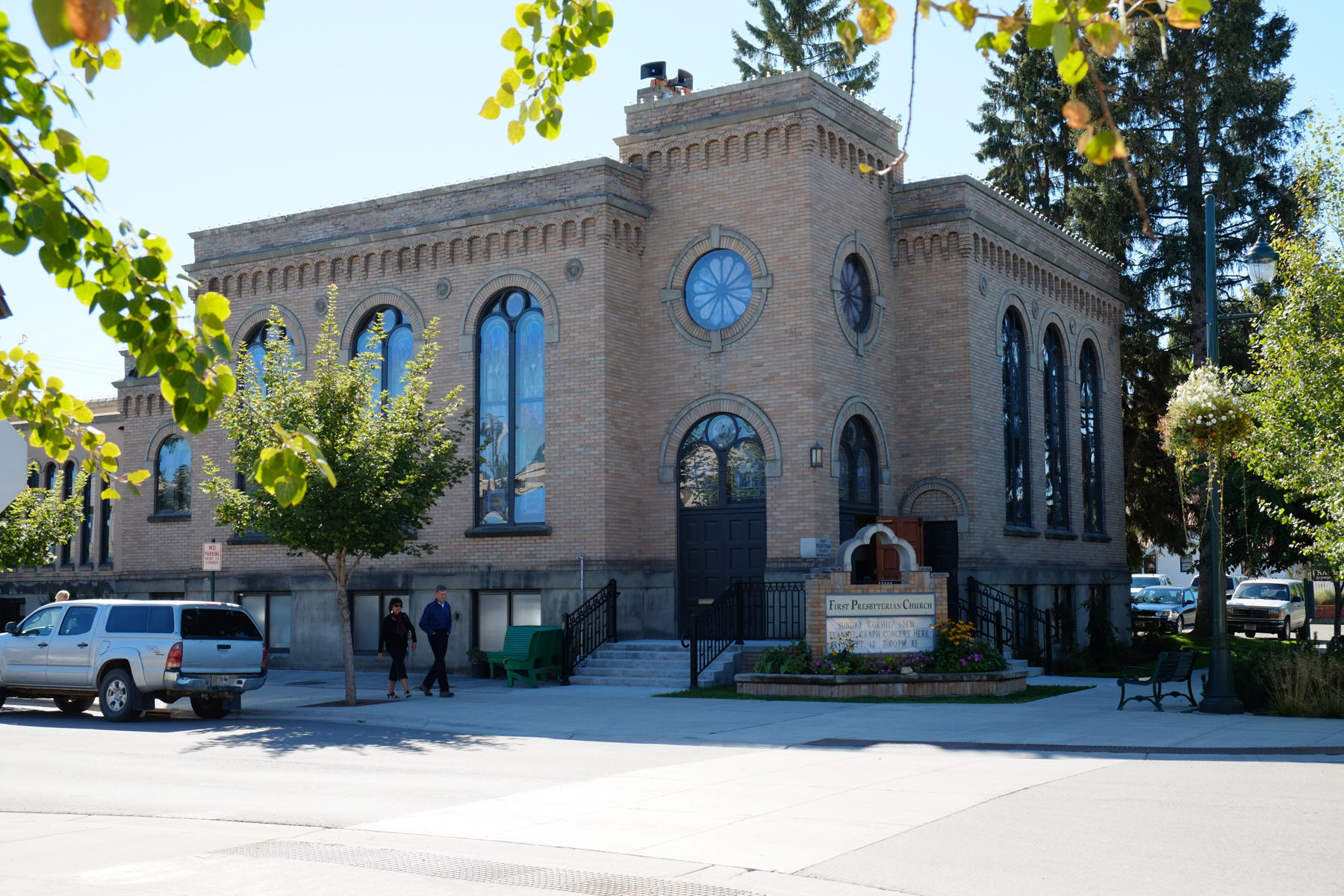
The First Presbyterian Church of Whitefish in Whitefish, Montana, designed by Rigg & Vantyne.

Rigg began his career as an architect in Danville, Illinois. He subsequently designed residential and commercial buildings in Spokane, Washington and Edmonton, with another Canadian architect, Arthur W. Cowley. Rigg designed the Salvation Army Building in Spokane in 1921; it was listed on the National Register of Historic Places (NRHP) in 2000.

With Roland Vantyne, Rigg designed many buildings in Spokane and Tacoma. They also designed the First Presbyterian Church in Whitefish, Montana, which is listed on the NRHP. He designed two buildings on the campus of Washington State University: Abelson Hall with Vantyne in 1935, and Engineering Laboratory Building in 1942. Over the course of his career, he designed hundreds of buildings, in multiple architectural styles.

Rigg was married to Mayme Ethel Beck. They resided in Spokane and had a daughter together. He was also a Freemason. He died on February 18, 1959, aged 80, in Spokane.

== Works ==
Rigg's works include:

- First Presbyterian Church (1921) in Whitefish, Montana, NRHP-listed
- Salvation Army Building (1921), 245 W. Main Ave., Spokane, Washington, NRHP-listed
- Abelson Hall (1935), Washington State University (with Vantyne)
- Engineering Laboratory Building (1942), Washington State University
