= West Downtown Historic Transportation Corridor =

Historic district in Spokane

- U.S. National Register of Historic Places
- U.S. Historic district
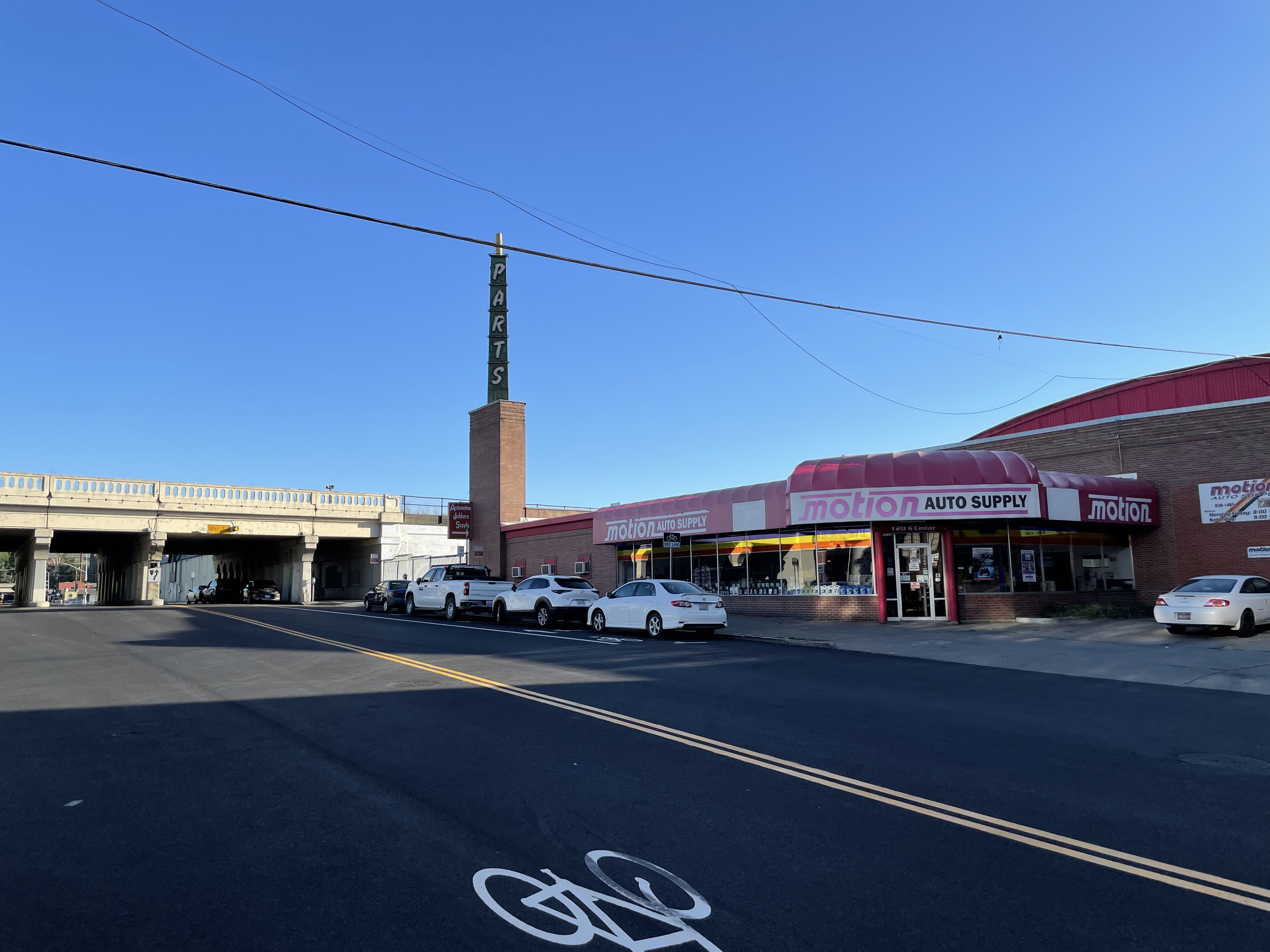

- Location within Spokane riverfront area Location within Washington (state) Location within the United States
- Location: Downtown, Spokane, Washington
- Coordinates: 47°39′20″N 117°25′44″W
- Area: 32 acres (13 ha)
- Built: 1890-1949
- Architect: Multiple
- Architectural style: Commercial Style
- NRHP reference No.: 99001631
- Added to NRHP: December 30, 1999

The West Downtown Historic Transportation Corridor is a historic commercial district in Spokane, Washington located, as the name suggests, in the western portion of the city's downtown neighborhood. The district, which was listed on the National Register of Historic Places (NRHP) in 1999, consists mostly of buildings constructed between the late 19th century and 1949. It contained at the time of listing 65 buildings or structures, 50 of which are considered contributing properties to the district. Seven properties in the district are listed on the NRHP individually as well.

It draws its name from its location along the Union Pacific and BNSF Railways and former route of U.S. Route 10, which ran along First Avenue one block north of the railroad grade. The district was constructed to serve the transportation industry of the railroad and later of the highway as well. Buildings in the district served purposes that originally fell into one of three categories: lodging for travelers, automotive service stations and showrooms, or railroad-dependent warehouses. Most of the buildings are constructed of red brick or reinforced masonry.

Prior to the construction of Interstate 90 in the 1960s, most travelers passing through Spokane were funneled through the district. In the decades after the arrival of the interstate, with much of its original purpose no longer in place, the district fell into decline and became a center for blight and crime in the city center. Starting in the late-1990s and continuing into the 2020s, the area has seen considerable investment and revitalization. It is now a vibrant part of the city center, home to numerous boutiques, restaurants, breweries and residences. While the district has largely moved on from its original transport-dependent industries, with the exception of a few hotels which still operate in the area, the visual integrity of the district remains mostly intact.

== Setting ==
Located on the west side of downtown Spokane, the West Downtown Historic Transportation Corridor stretches from Post St. on the east to Walnut St. on the west, between First and Second Avenues. Elevated railroad tracks run east to west through the middle of the district, midway between First and Second Avenues. There are also a pair of alleyways on both sides of the tracks, between First and Second, respectively. The northern of the two is named Railroad Avenue.

Like the rest of downtown south of the Spokane River, the area is located on relatively flat tableland above the Spokane River Gorge at roughly 1,900 feet above sea level. The land drops off dramatically into the gorge just one city block from the district's western edge.

The West Downtown Historic Transportation District is adjacent to three other historic districts listed on the NRHP. Immediately to the northwest is the Riverside Avenue Historic District. On the other side of Post St., between the two alleyways on either side of the railroad tracks, is the westernmost extension of the East Downtown Historic District. The Browne's Addition Historic District begins less than a block west along First Ave.

First and Second Avenue traverse the district in a west−east direction as one-way streets. First carries traffic eastbound into the central business district from the adjacent Browne's Addition neighborhood and also from across the northern side of the city as the busy Maple Street Bridge feeds into the street. Second Avenue carries traffic westbound. Both are classified as principal arterials by the city. Monroe Street on the district's western edge is also a principal arterial in the city as it features one of the six automobile river crossings in the city center, the Monroe Street Bridge, a few blocks north of the district.

== History ==
The city of Spokane was founded in 1873 a few blocks to the north of what would become the West Downtown Historic Transportation Corridor. As the city grew in the following years, an area known as Railroad Addition was platted in 1881. Most of the district is located in Railroad Addition, with the westernmost portions located in an addition to the Railroad Addition which was platted a year later.

The arrival of the Northern Pacific Railroad in 1881 linked Spokane with the rest of the nation and allowed the city to grow into the major distribution center for the Inland Northwest. Many of the buildings which comprise the district were constructed as warehouses to support the distribution industry brought to the city, to serve it and the wider region, by the railroad. By 1900, nine railroads passed through Spokane. Of the railroad-based districts around the city, the west side of downtown is at this day the most intact as it was originally developed.

As the city saw its population boom around the turn of the 20th century, the city had a housing shortage. Many of the new arrivals to Spokane were single males who moved to the city seeking work as craftsmen or laborers. A large number of single-room occupancy hotels were constructed in the city, with many built along the railroad on First Avenue.

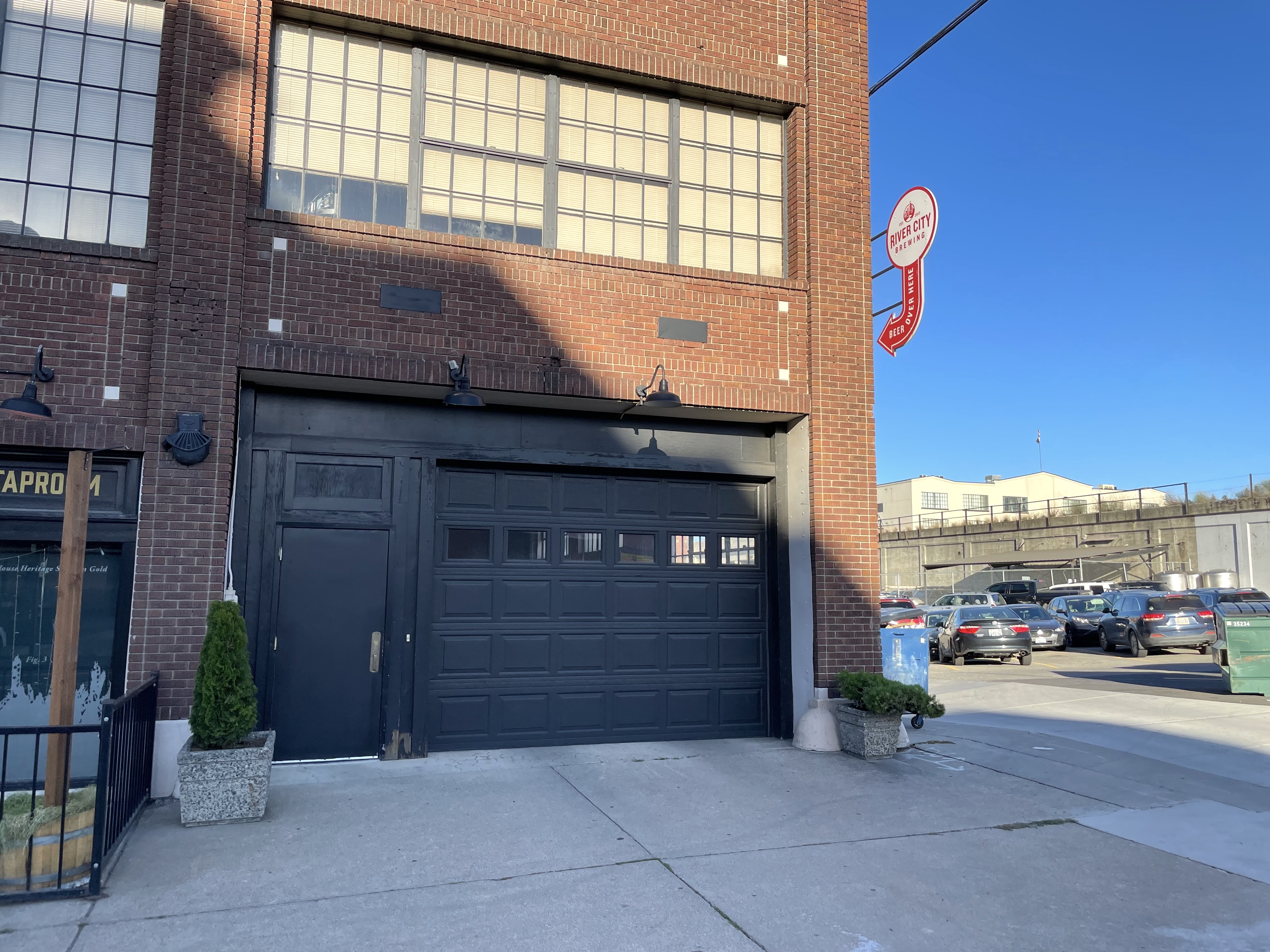
Garage door on the Eldridge Building, a former car dealership, with the elevated railroad in the background

In 1908, the railroad tracks were raised above grade in order to alleviate traffic congestion in the city center. The poured-concrete embankment raised the tracks 12-to-14 feet above the street level. As of 2022, the raised tracks continue to exist, though they often cause problems with the size of modern vehicles attempting to cross underneath. When the tracks were initially constructed, they caused another problem by sealing off some of the businesses which had been built to face the previously street-level tracks. This issue led to a flurry of legal action which brought the construction of the embankment to a halt for two years. Construction was completed in 1916 at a cost of $2.5 million.

With the expansion of the automobile in the early-20th century, an "auto row" district developed along west First Avenue. Numerous dealerships appeared in the area, and in 1911 Regal Motor Car Company made Spokane its distribution center for the Northwest.

The district's transition from railroad-dependent to automobile-dependent continued in 1925 when U.S. Route 10 was established and routed through Spokane. Its original alignment ran down what is now First Avenue. The road would be rerouted twice in the coming decades, first to Sprague Avenue and then in the 1930s it was moved to Third Avenue. Neither rerouting moved the highway more than one block on either side of the current historic district, however.

Things changed dramatically for downtown Spokane as a whole when Interstate 90 was routed through the southern part of the city center in the 1960s. The interstate replaced U.S. Route 10 from street level to an elevated, controlled access highway three blocks south. The arrival of the interstate, along with related factors like suburbanization and the development of shopping centers outside of the city's core, led to a period of economic decline across downtown Spokane in the 1960s and 1970s. Paradoxically, that period of decline would ultimately lead in part to the vibrant and historic nature of the district today, as lack of economic development spared the historic buildings from being torn down to make way for modern construction.

By the late 20th century, the west end of downtown had become a center for drug use, prostitution and gang activity. In 1996, a turf war broke out on West First Avenue that resulted in multiple shootings. Many of the buildings had fallen into disrepair or outright abandonment, while others were holding on as low-income housing. The neighborhood was viewed unfavorably by many in the city, with The Spokesman-Review calling the area “headquarters for vagrants and pigeons.”

Redevelopment efforts began in the area around that time. Derelict apartment and former hotels were renovated and converted into working-class apartments. Street level storefronts began to be leased to bars, restaurants, cafes and shops, especially on First Avenue. The Davenport Arts District was established surrounding the nearby Davenport Hotel and overlapped with the eastern section of the transportation corridor along First Avenue, allowing the nascent arts district to spill into the historic district.

By the 2020s, the district had turned into one of the more vibrant areas in downtown Spokane. The area is home to numerous restaurants and shops and five breweries, three of which are located at the intersection of First and Cedar alone. In 2023, the City Line bus rapid transit system began service in Spokane, passing through the district along First Avenue and making two stops in it, at Adams and Monroe Streets.

== Contributing properties ==
At the time the district was listed on the NRHP, it contained 65 buildings, 50 of which were considered to be contributing properties. Of those, seven are listed individually on the NRHP on their own merit.

=== Central Steam Heat Plant ===
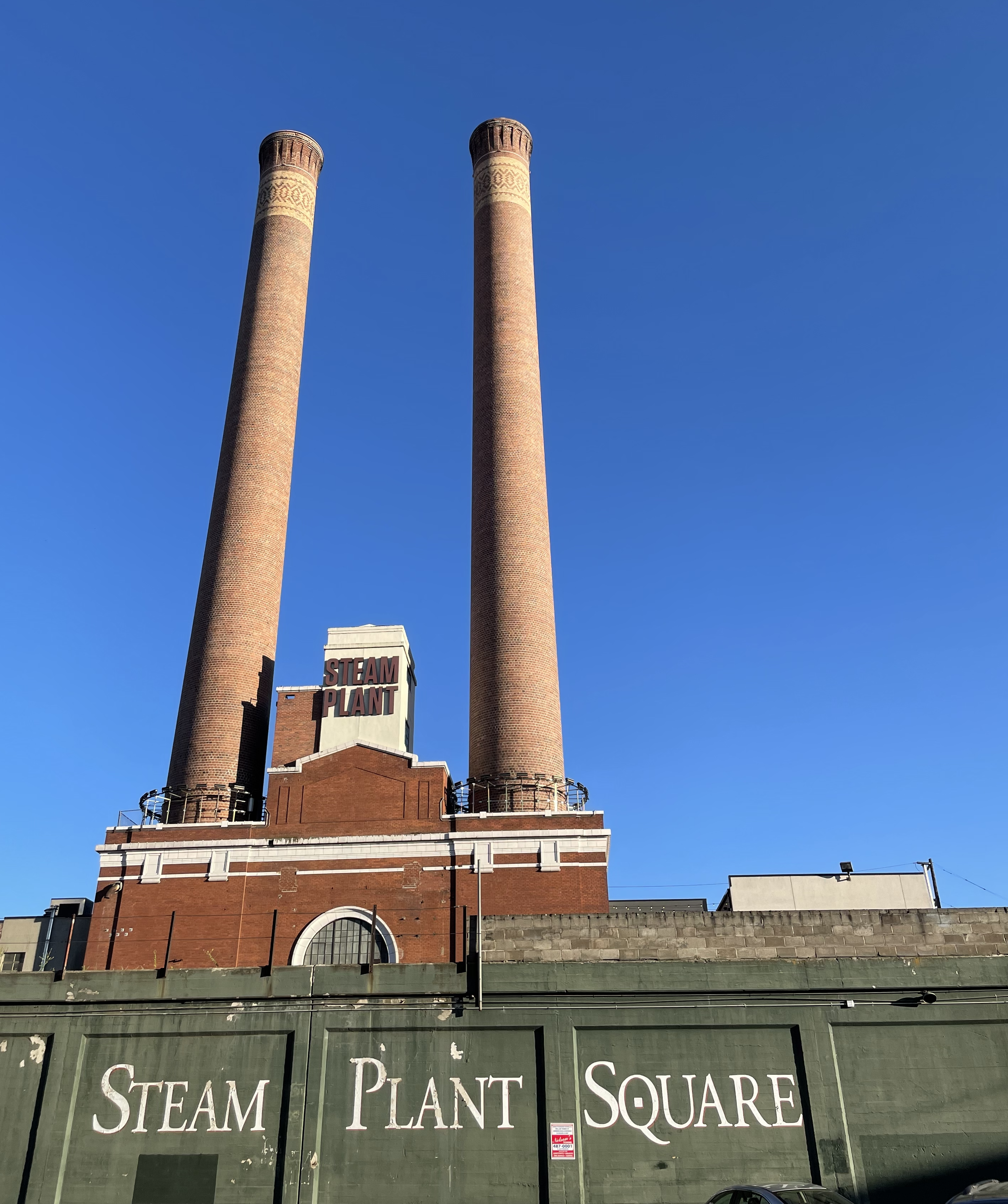
The Steam Plant

The Central Steam Heat Plant, commonly known as Steam Plant Square, or simply as the Steam Plant, is a historic building in originally built to provide steam heating to more than 300 buildings in Spokane's city center. The Steam Plant served that purpose until the 1980s, when it was no longer viable. In the 1990s, the Steam Plant and adjacent Seehorn-Lang Building were converted into Steam Plant Square, a commercial, retail and restaurant center. The conversion maintained many of the industrial steam plant structures such as furnaces, boilers, catwalks and pipe networks, which can still be seen and explored by visitors and patrons. The Steam Plant's pair of 225 foot tall stacks have been a unique and iconic aspect of the city's skyline for more than a century, and are illuminated from their base at night. If the stacks were considered to be a building, they would rank as the third tallest in the city.

=== Commercial Block ===
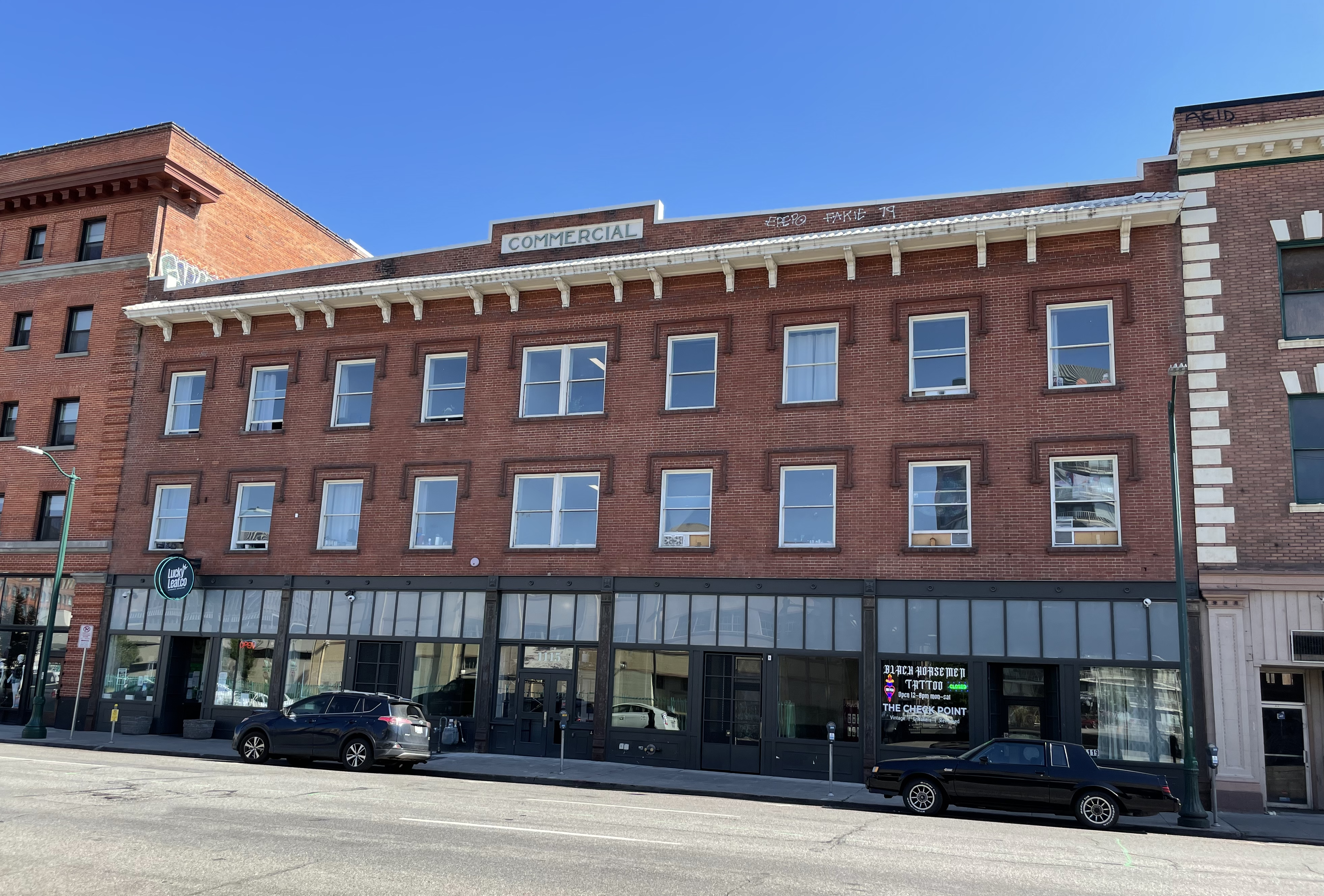
Commercial Block

The Commercial Block is a historic, three-story building at 1111-1119 W. 1st Avenue designed by architect Isaac J. Galbraith in 1906 for Dr. Joseph Gandy on property owned by his wife, Harriet Ross Gandy. With commercial space on the ground floor, originally housing a meat market and a furniture store, and apartments above, it was one of the first mixed-use buildings in the neighborhood. It later served as a hotel until the early-1980s. By the 1990s, the building served as low-income housing, a transition made by numerous other buildings in the district at the time. As the area saw revitalization around the turn of the 21st century, the building has served as a corporate office and student housing.

As of 2023, the building has returned to its original use, with commercial space on the street level and housing on the floors above.

=== Eldridge Building ===
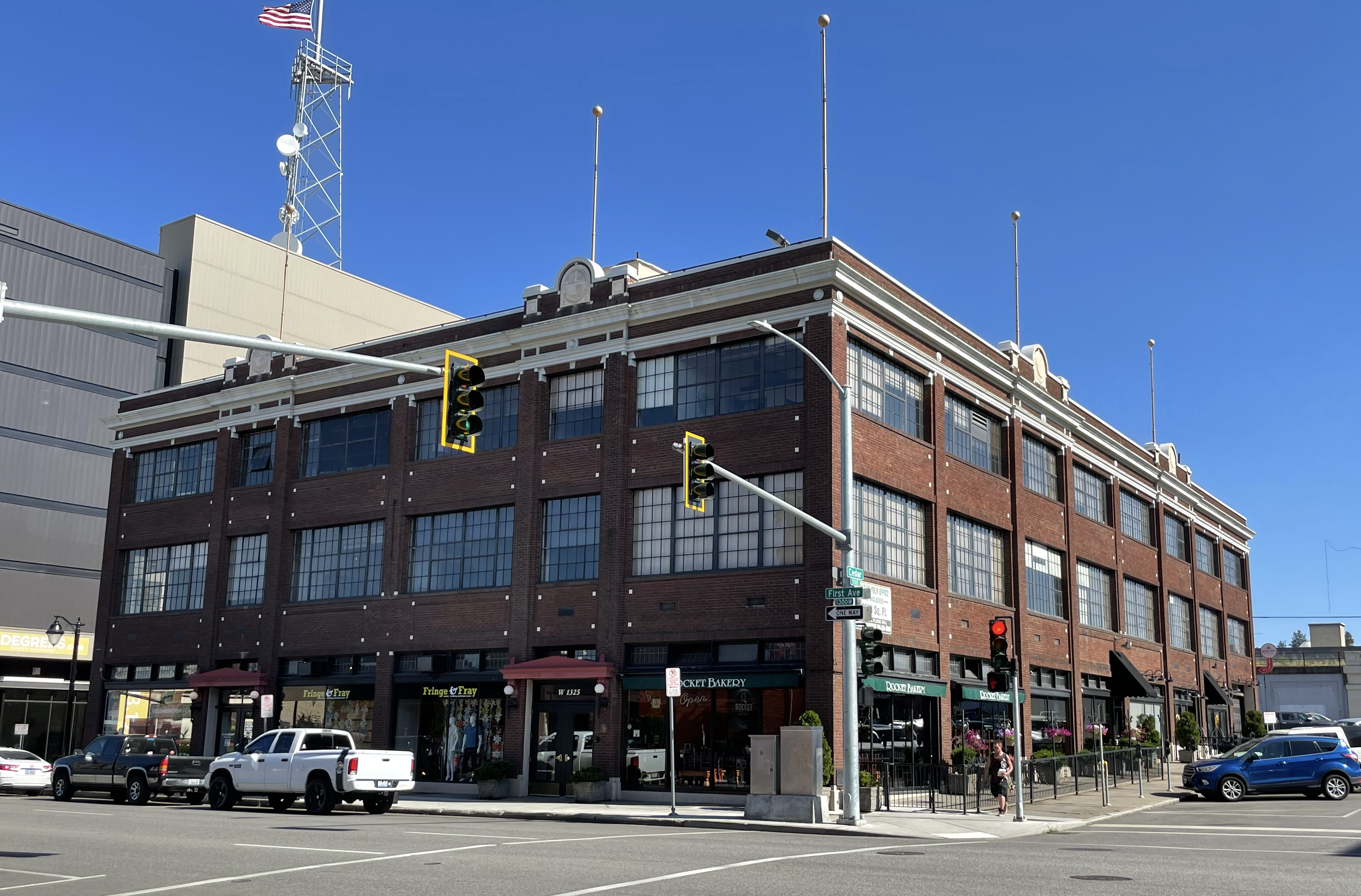
Eldridge Building

The Eldridge Building is a historic building designed by architect Gustav Albin Pehrson and built in 1925. It has been listed on the National Register of Historic Places (NRHP) since November 12, 1992. It is one of three historic buildings listed on the NRHP at the intersection of First Avenue and Cedar Street. To the west across Cedar is the Grand Coulee building and to the northwest, kitty-corner from the Eldridge Building, is the former Carnegie Library.

Originally built to serve as a Buick dealership, the Eldridge Building has retained its commercial purpose throughout the years, unlike many of the residential buildings in the district which fell into periods of disrepair or abandonment. As of 2023 it is home to shops, a cafe and a brewery on the street level with office space on the levels above.

=== Hotel Upton ===
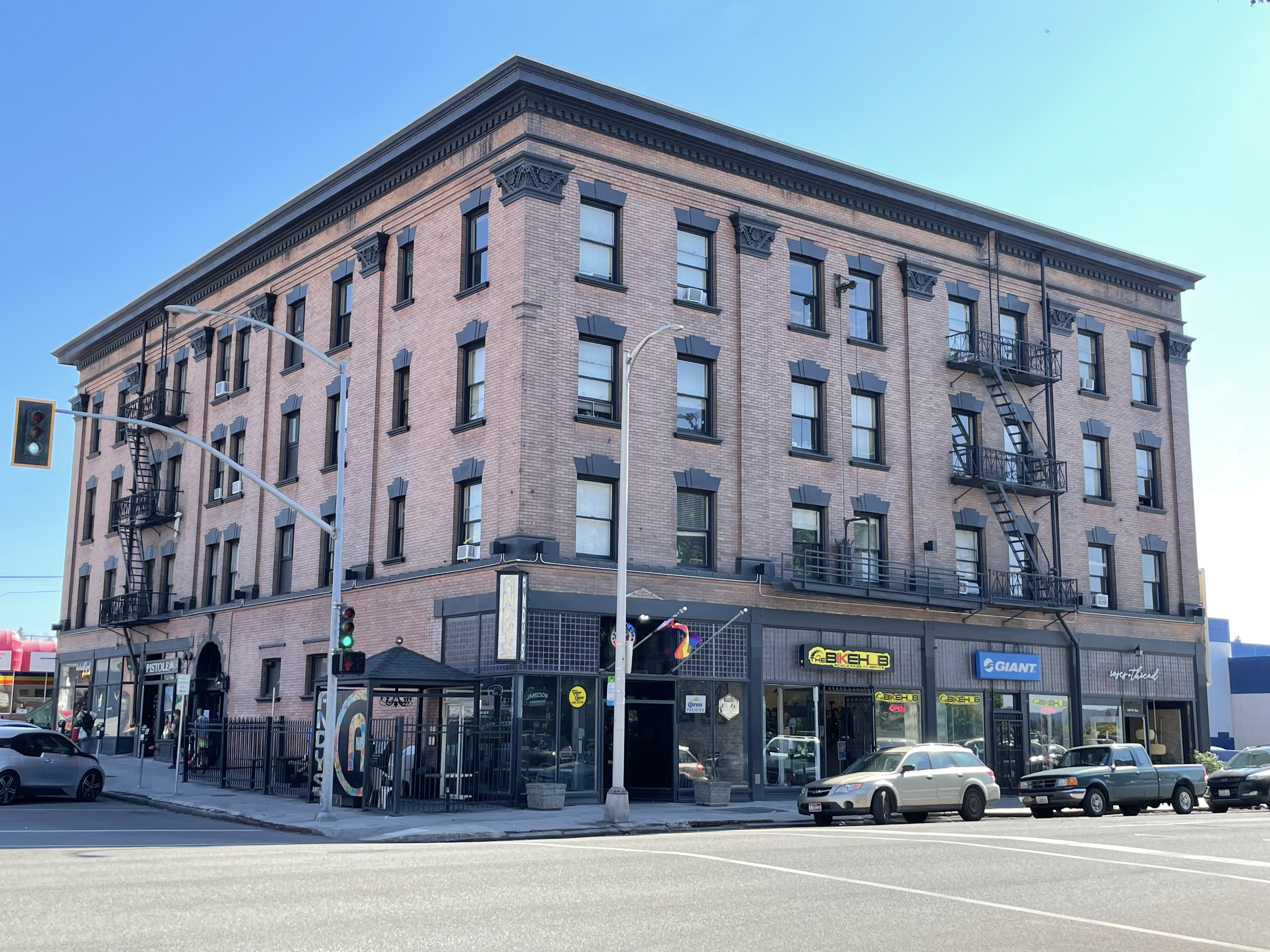
Hotel Upton

Hotel Upton, also known as Grand Coulee Hotel and at present as the Grand Coulee Apartments, is a historic four-story building in Spokane, Washington. It was designed by Loren L. Rand, and built as a 102-room hotel in 1910. It was renamed the Grand Coulee Hotel in 1933. It has been listed on the National Register of Historic Places since July 29, 1994. A renovation project in the 1990s uncovered aspects of the building, like its prism-glass transom doorways, which had been hidden during decades of neglect.

It is one of three historic buildings at the intersection of First Avenue and Cedar Street listed on the NRHP. To the east across Cedar is the Eldridge Building and to the north across First is the former Carnegie Library. As of 2023, it contains commercial space on the street level including shops and a bar, with apartment housing on the upper levels.

=== Montvale Hotel ===
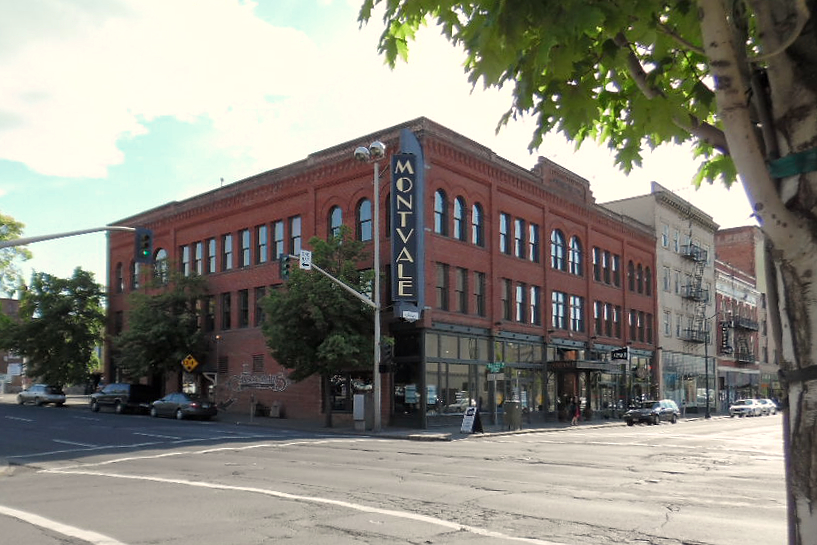
Montvale Hotel

The Montvale Hotel is a boutique hotel originally built in 1889 as an SRO (Single Room Occupancy Hotel). It is the oldest hotel still standing in Spokane. The building also previously served as an apartment building, a brothel, and as a youth hostel during Expo '74, and then was abandoned for 30 years. It was restored and re-opened in January 2005 as a 36-room boutique hotel with restaurant spaces on the street and lower levels, a purpose it continues to serve as of 2023.

=== Otis Hotel ===
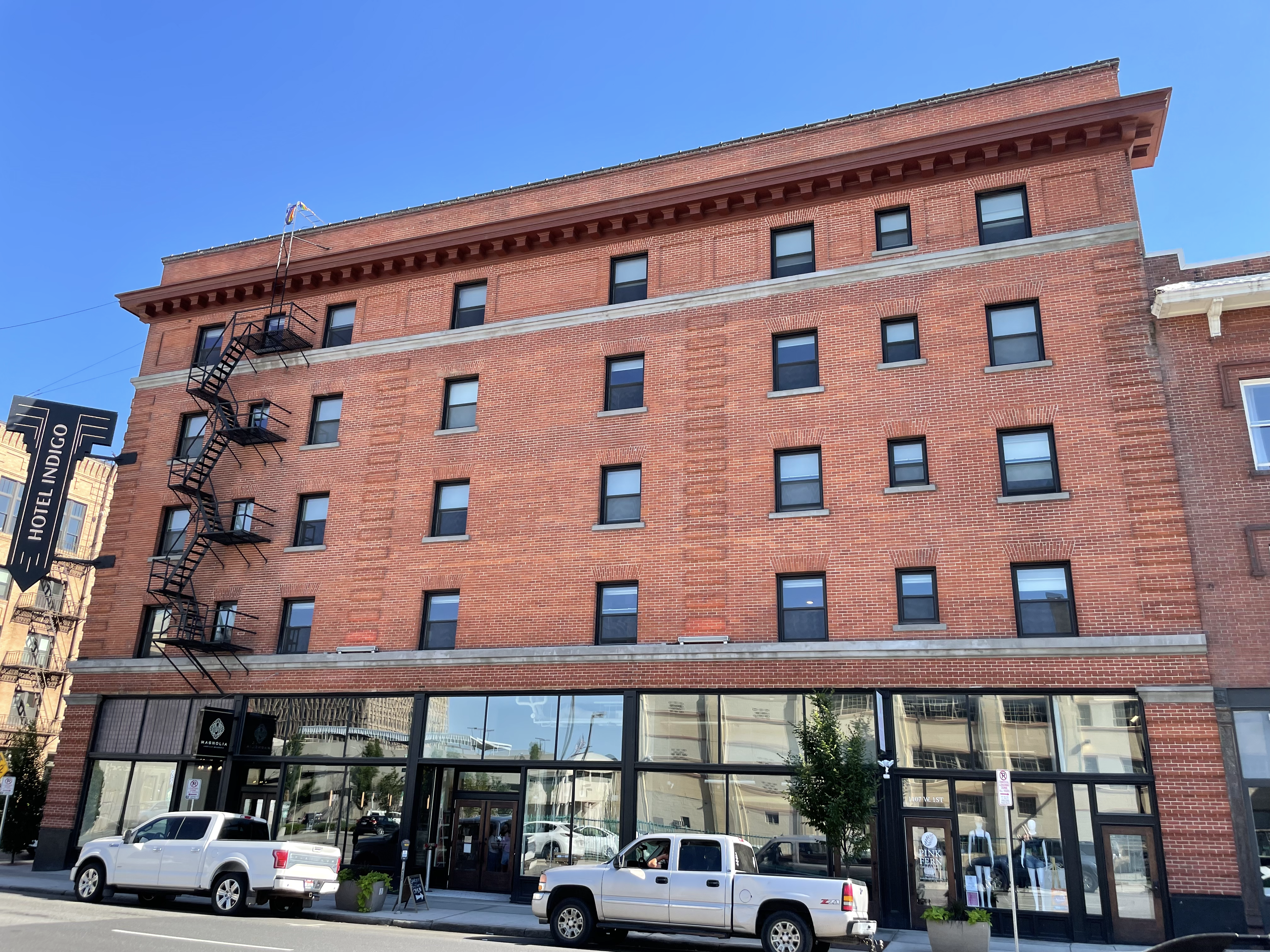
Otis Hotel

The Otis Hotel is a historic five-story building, designed by Arthur W. Cowley and Archibald G. Rigg, and built in 1911 for Dr. Joseph E. Gandy. It was first known as the Willard Hotel, and later as the Atlantic Hotel, followed by the Earle Hotel, and finally the Otis Hotel. It has been listed on the National Register of Historic Places since October 2, 1998.

Like much of the district, the building fell into disrepair and neglect in the second-half of the 20th century. By the 1990s it was used as housing for transients and was called a "symbol of downtown’s decay" by the local newspaper, The Spokesman-Review. Since a $15 million renovation completed to convert the building back into a hotel in early 2020, the building has been reopened as the Hotel Indigo Spokane and is part of the InterContinental Hotels Group with a restaurant on the street level and hotel rooms above.

=== Seehorn-Lang Building ===
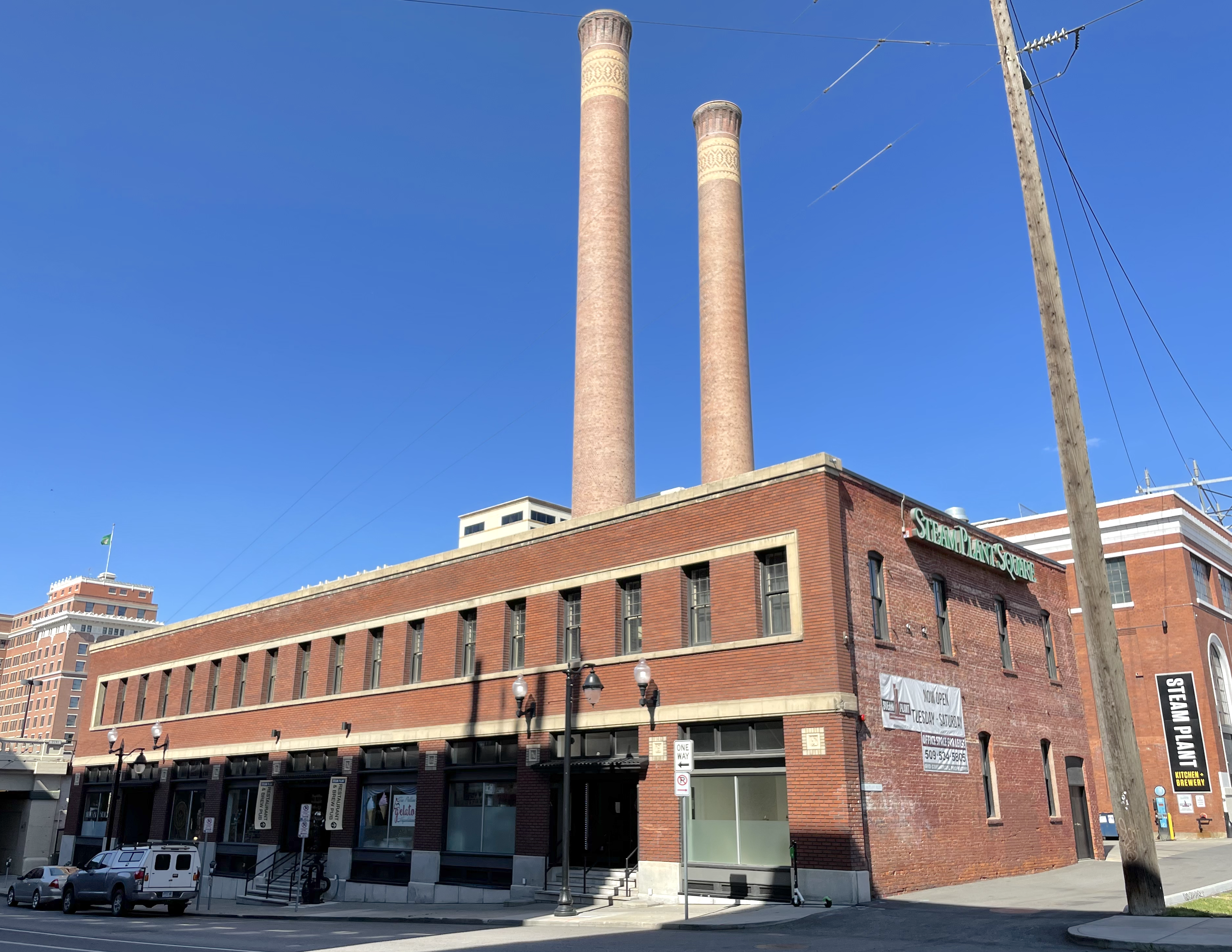
Seehorn-Lang Building

The Seehorn-Lang Building is a historic building at 165 S. Lincoln Ave., that since the late 1990s has been commonly known as part of Steam Plant Square, a commercial and retail center which it forms together with the adjacent Central Steam Heat Plant building. Built in 1890, it is one of the oldest buildings in Spokane, as many buildings constructed prior were destroyed in the Great Spokane Fire of 1889. The building is listed on the National Register of Historic Places (NRHP) as well as the state and local historic registers. The building is named for Elihu "Billy" Seehorn, who operated the Seehorn Transfer and Storage Company on the premises from 1910 to 1925, and John Lang, who acquired the building from Seehorn.

The Seehorn-Lang Building is the only remaining example of a 1920s-era wood-framed storefront with original windows and doors in the city's central business district.

== See also ==
- Riverside, Spokane
- National Register of Historic Places listings in Spokane County, Washington
