= Eldridge Building =

- U.S. National Register of Historic Places
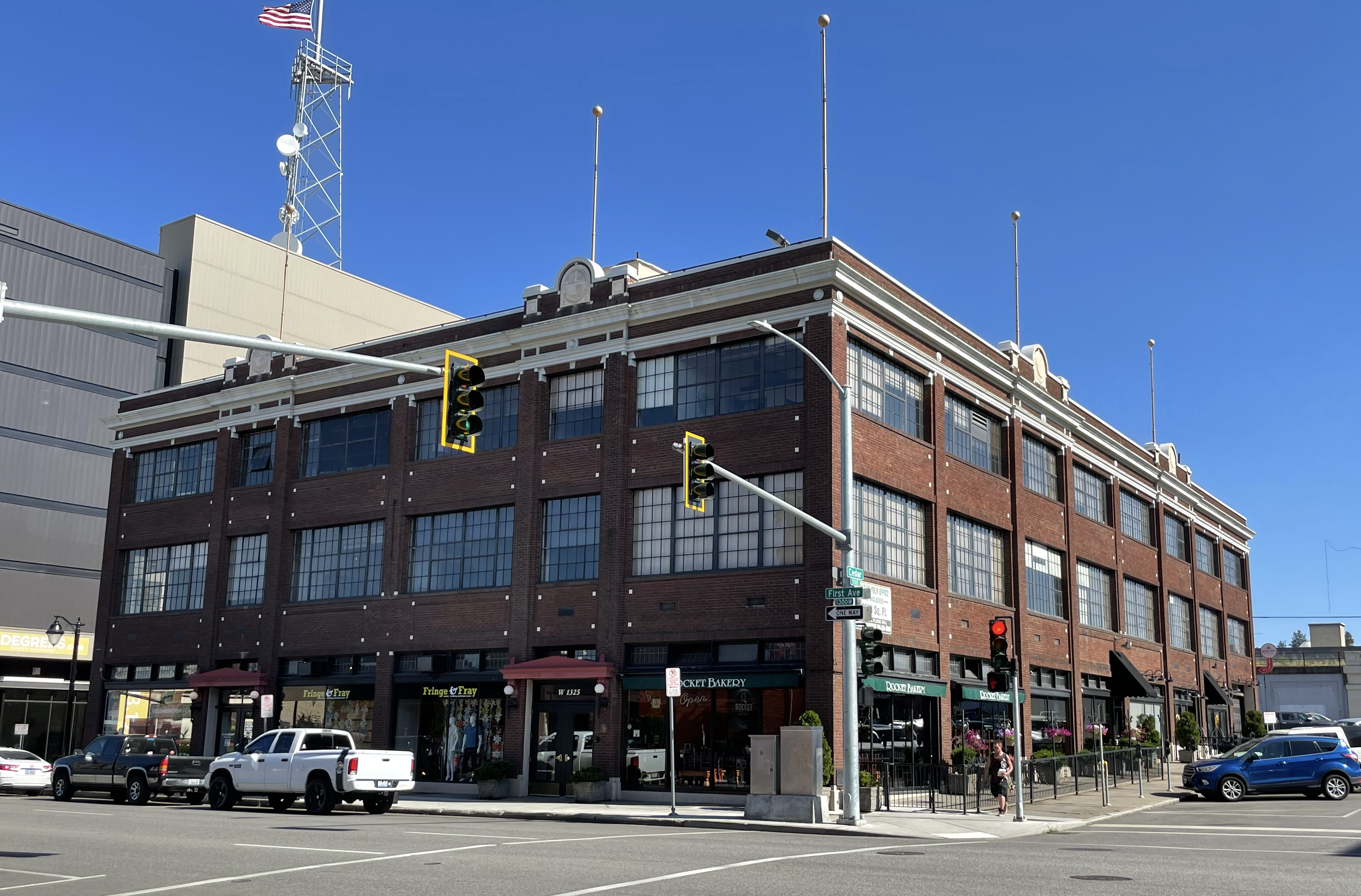
- The building in 2022

- Location within Spokane riverfront area
- Location: 1319--1325 West First Avenue, Spokane, Washington
- Coordinates: 47°39′24″N 117°25′51″W
- Area: 0.3 acres (0.12 ha)
- Built: 1925
- Architect: Gustav Albin Pehrson
- Architectural style: Chicago, The Commercial Style
- NRHP reference No.: 92001588
- Added to NRHP: November 12, 1992

The Eldridge Building is a historic building in Spokane, Washington. It was designed by architect Gustav Albin Pehrson, and built in 1925. It has been listed on the National Register of Historic Places (NRHP) since November 12, 1992. It is one of three historic buildings listed on the NRHP at the intersection of First Avenue and Cedar Street. To the west across Cedar is the Grand Coulee building and to the northwest, kitty-corner from the Eldridge Building, is the former Carnegie Library.

Originally built to house a Buick dealership, the Eldridge Building has maintained its commercial nature over the years.

== History ==
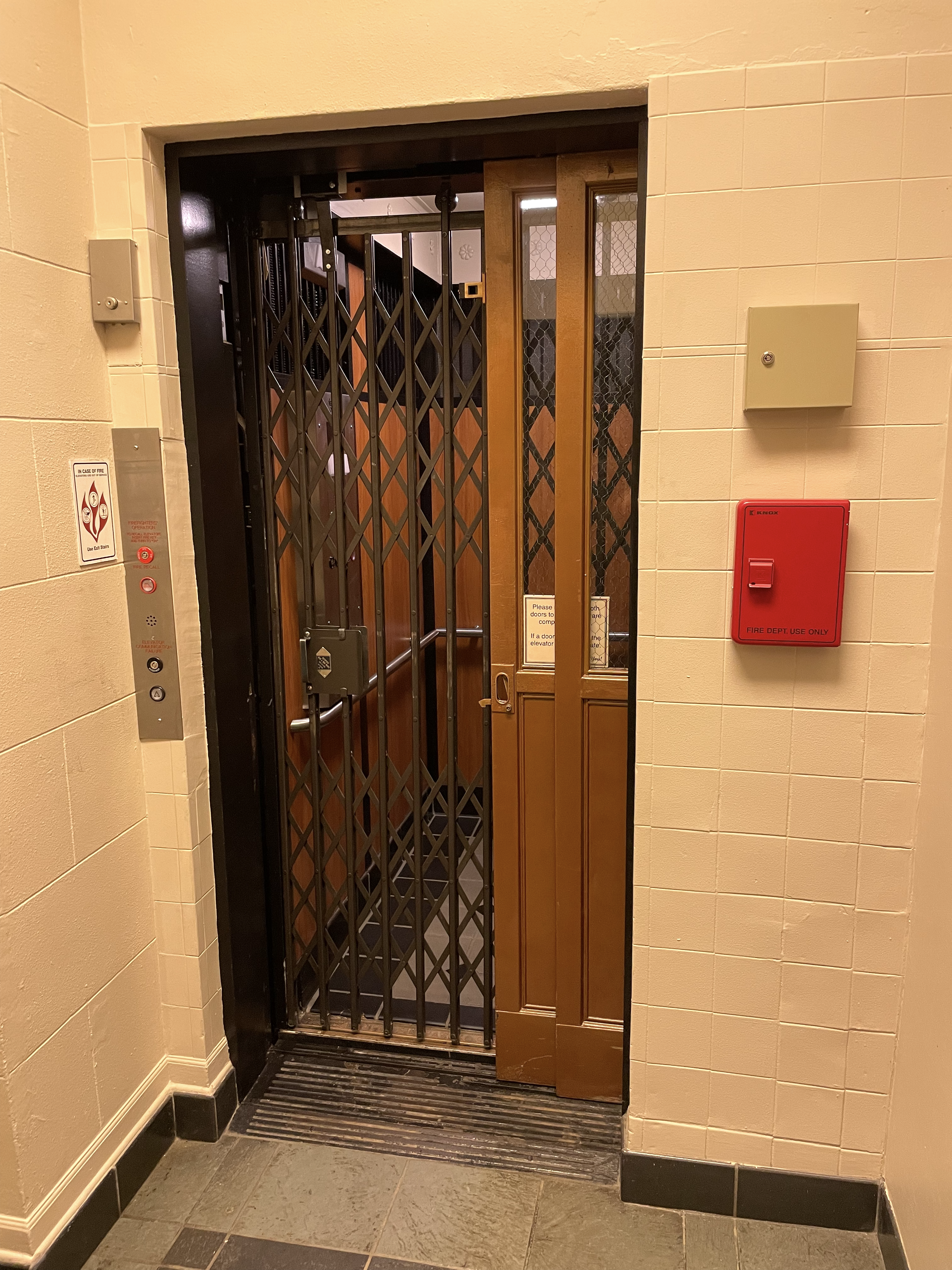
Old-fashioned elevator door in the Eldridge Building

Arthur S. Eldridge, a distributor for Buick who owned the rights to sell their cars in the state of Washington, founded Eldridge Buick in 1916. In 1925, Eldridge Buick moved into the then newly constructed Eldridge Building. At the time, the area surrounding the Eldridge Building on the west edge of downtown was home to numerous one and two story buildings catering to the city's automotive community. At three stories and 60,000 square feet, the Eldridge Building was one of the largest automotive facilities in the area and considered to be one of the most modern. It was outfitted with an elevator that could take cars to any level of the building including the roof, air exhaust systems, automatically timed lighting, and full service parts and repair service centers.

Eldridge Buick was sold to Clayton and Lester Kauffman in 1936 and renamed Kauffman Buick, though the Eldridge Building remained under the ownership of the Eldridge family. Kaufman Buick would become Becker Buick, which operated at the Eldridge Building until 1958 when it relocated to the east side of Downtown in 1958. Since the Buick dealership moved out in the late 1950s, the Eldridge Building has been home to a variety of retail businesses on its lower floors and offices on the upper floors.

Arthur Eldridge died in 1954, while the building he commissioned was still serving its original purpose, as a Buick dealership.

By the 1980s the area surrounding the Eldridge Building had deteriorated and become home to vagrants. It was at that time that Spokane developer and preservationist Ron Wells purchased the Eldridge Building, along with numerous others in the immediate vicinity including the Grand Coulee and Buena Vista buildings across the street from the Eldridge Building, as well as the San Marco and three other buildings around the intersection of First and Cedar. Wells' company began rehabilitating the buildings in what he dubbed Carnegie Square, due to the presence of an old Carnegie Library in the area, in the early 1990s. Economic development and rehabilitation in the Eldridge Building and its neighbors has continued into the 2020s, with over $50 million in plans for the area as of 2018. Continued revitalization around the Eldrige Building has included a change in the neighborhood's character and name, which began to be referred to as downtown Spokane's "West End" in recent years. Since the 2010s the area has become a hub for breweries, with the Eldridge Building home to River City Brewing since 2012.

== Description ==
The Eldridge Building is a three-story structure built in the commercial style located on the southeast corner of the intersection of First Ave. and Cedar St. in the west end of Downtown Spokane. It is a contributing property to the West Downtown Historic Transportation Corridor, a historic district listed on the NRHP. Another NRHP-listed historic district, the Riverside Avenue Historic District, begins just to the north across Cedar. An elevated railway carrying BNSF and Amtrak trains passes through the block east-to-west to the south of the building. First Ave. is a one-way street carrying traffic eastbound into the downtown core, and classified as a major arterial by the city. Cedar is a two-way street classified as a local-access street.

Rectangular in shape, the Eldridge Building stretches for 100 feet along First Ave. and 156 feet down Cedar St. It is built of reinforced concrete with red brick facades and terra cotta accents on its two street-facing sides. These two sides are covered extensively by large, rectangular windows separated by piers. They are nearly symmetrical in design with the exception of the difference in length and that the Cedar St. facade has a garage door entrance located on its southern end.

The upper floors house office space while the ground floor is home to numerous shops and retail stores. As of 2022, longtime retail tenants include a coffee shop and bakery, a boutique resale clothing shop, and a craft brewery and taproom.
