= Riverside Avenue Historic District =

Historic district in Washington, United States

- U.S. National Register of Historic Places
- U.S. Historic district
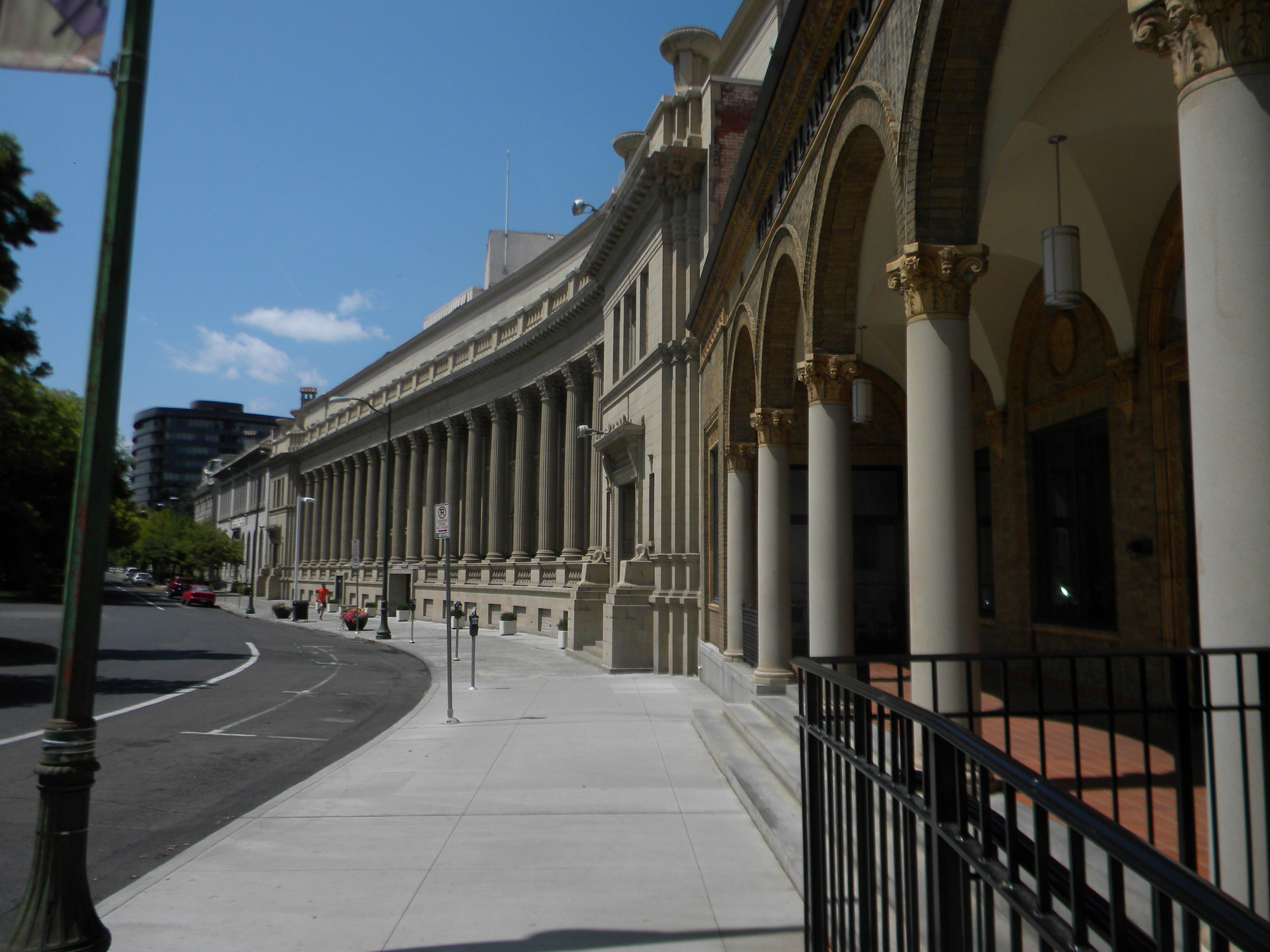
- Colonnaded facade of Masonic Temple

- Location within Spokane riverfront area Location within Washington (state) Location within the United States
- Location: Riverside Ave., Spokane, Washington
- Coordinates: 47°39′27″N 117°25′44″W
- Area: 16.5 acres (6.7 ha)
- Built: 1902
- Architect: Multiple
- Architectural style: Late 19th And 20th Century Revivals, Romanesque
- NRHP reference No.: 76001921
- Added to NRHP: July 30, 1976

The Riverside Avenue Historic District is a 16.5 acres (6.7 ha) historic district in Downtown Spokane, Washington consisting of buildings constructed in the early 20th century, and was listed on the National Register of Historic Places in 1976. The listing includes 14 contributing properties, nine of which are considered primary and five are considered secondary.

The district runs primarily along Riverside Avenue for five blocks from Monroe Street on the east to Walnut Street on the west. Additionally, some adjacent buildings that front Main Street, one block north of Riverside; Sprague Avenue, one block south of Riverside; and Cedar Street, which intersects Riverside in the west are also included. A tree-lined parkway in the middle of the street runs through this stretch of Riverside from Monroe to Cedar, then up Cedar for one block to First Ave.

Initially known as the Civic Center due to its concentration of monumental buildings and public spaces, designed and built as part of the City Beautiful movement. Over the years, the district has seen a handful of more modern intrusions within its bounds, but generally retains its historic character. The rear of the buildings are considerably higher than the southern façades, with north-facing walls occasionally being basements.

== Setting ==
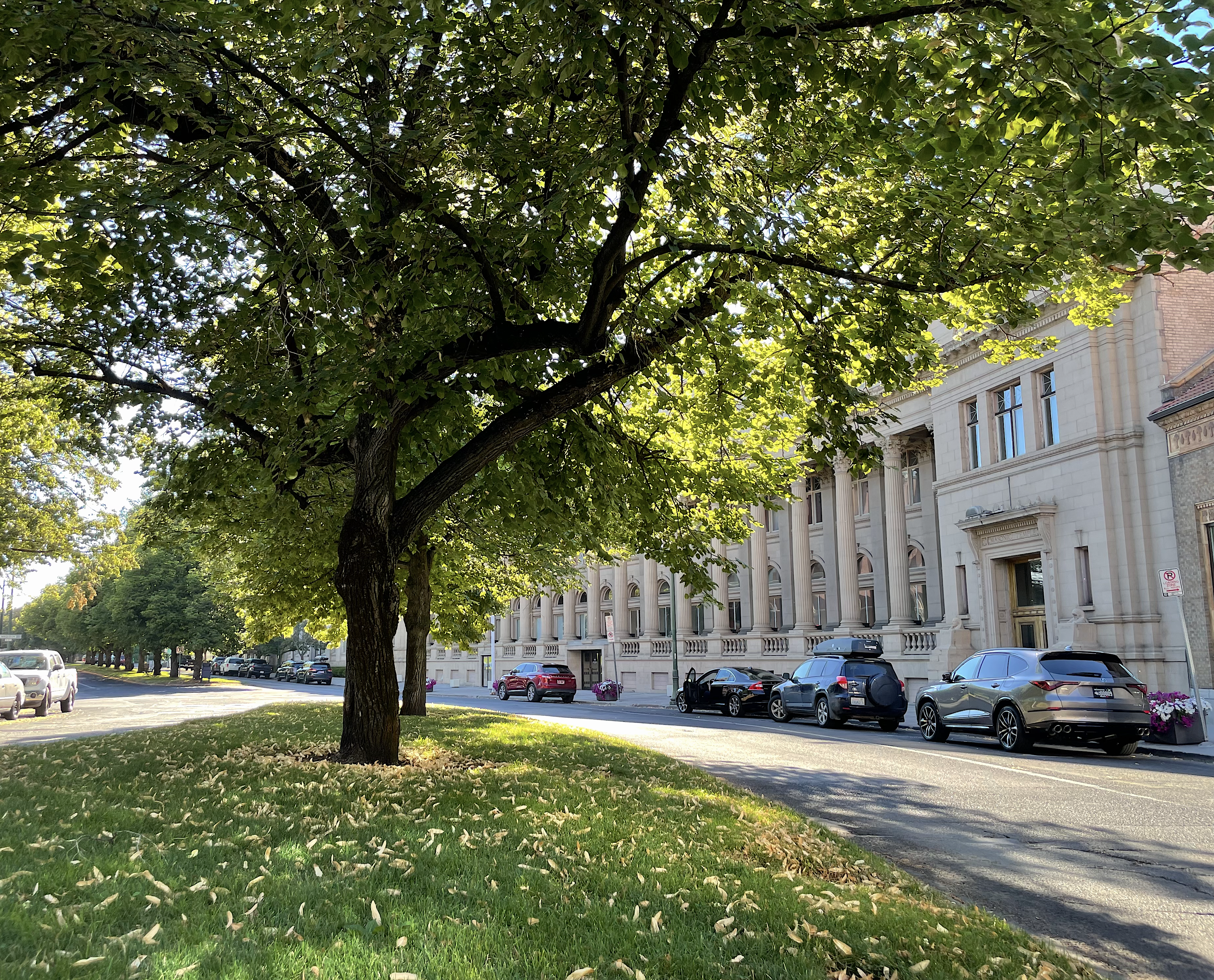
Riverside Avenue Parkway looking west

Located on the west side of Downtown Spokane, the Riverside Avenue Historic District sits atop the crest of the hill rising up from the Spokane River Gorge to the north. The district's elevation is between roughly 1,860 and 1,880 feet above sea level, but it quickly drops off to the north of Riverside and falls more than 150 feet to the level of the Spokane River just over one city block to the north. This ridge trends slightly to the south as it moves downstream (east to west), making land on the north side of Riverside in the western portion of the historic district unsuitable for development.

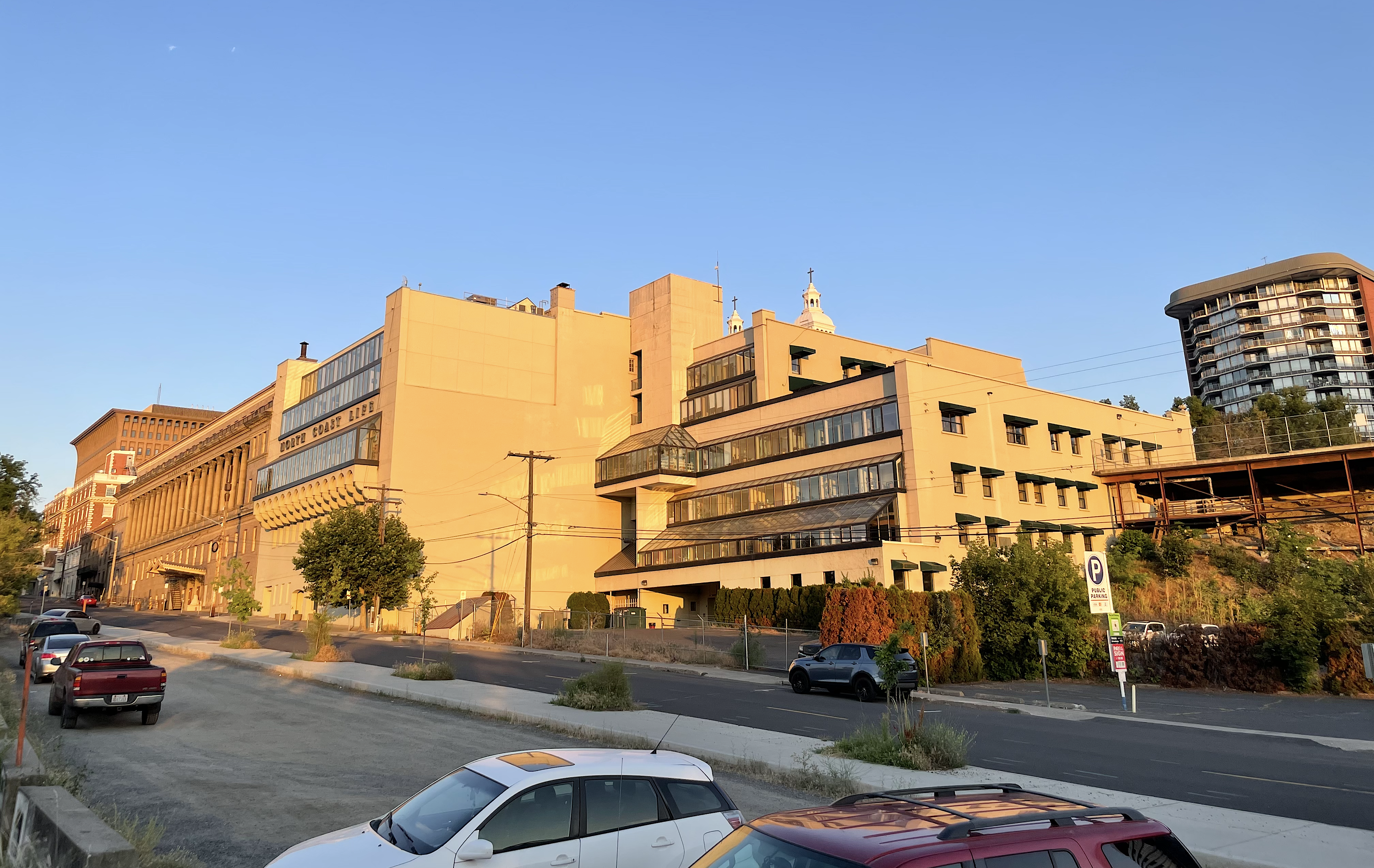
Rear view of properties from Main

Monroe Street, a north-south street marking the eastern boundary of the district, is classified as a primary arterial by the city of Spokane and serves as a busy thoroughfare connecting both sides of the river across the Monroe Street Bridge, located a block north of the historic district. Riverside Avenue itself is classified as a minor arterial through the city center east of Monroe, but is classified as a collector as it passes through the historic district.

It is one of many national historic districts in the immediate area. The Riverside Avenue Historic District directly borders the Peaceful Valley Historic District down the bluff to the northwest, and the West Downtown Historic Transportation Corridor to the south. To the west, the large Browne's Addition does not directly border the Riverside Avenue Historic District, but the two come within half-a-block of each other. The East Downtown Historic District's western edge is at Post Street, two blocks southeast of the intersection of Riverside and Monroe.

== Contributing properties ==
=== Spokane Club ===
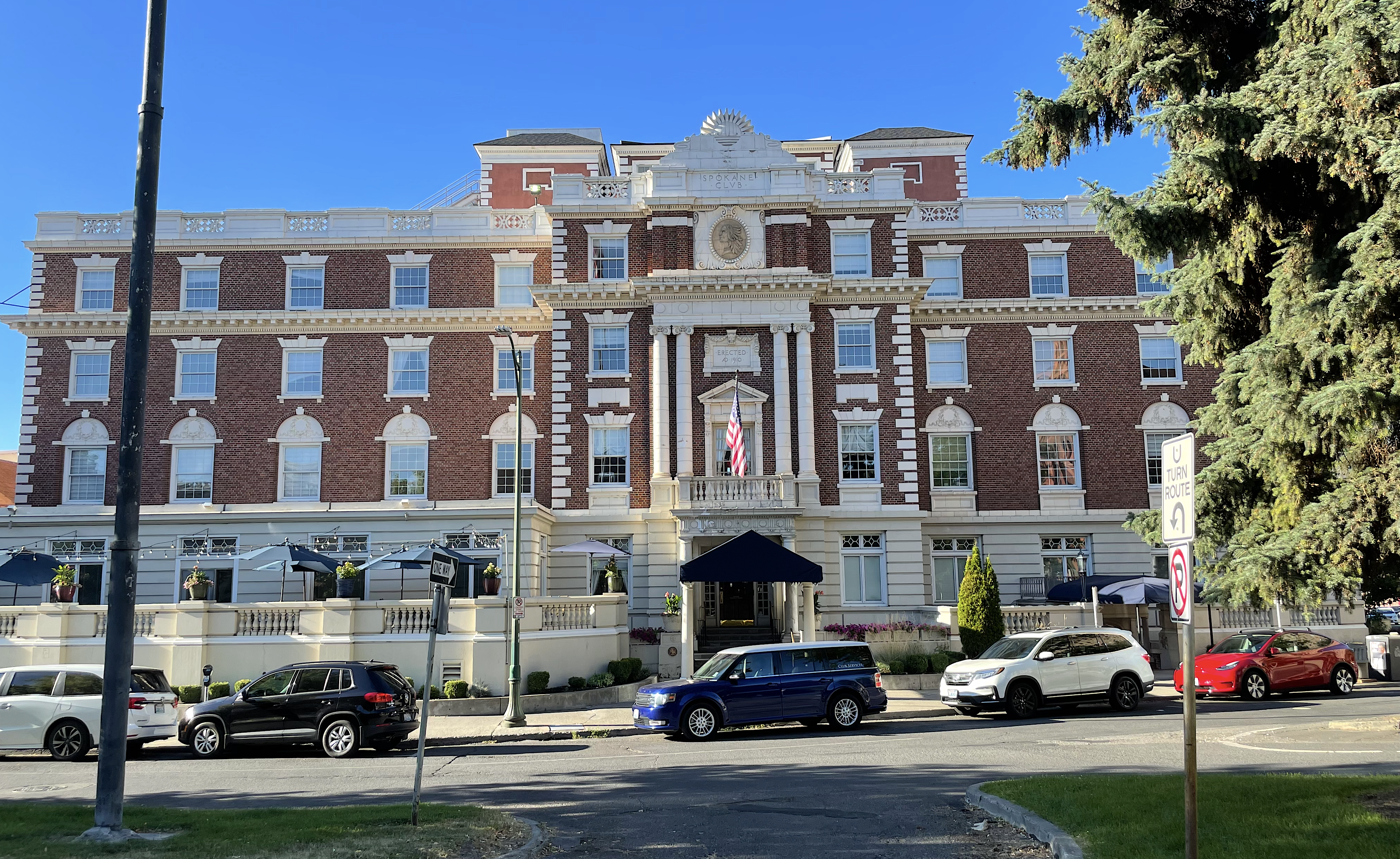
Spokane Club

Located at 1002 W. Riverside Ave., the Spokane Club is a Georgian Revival structure designed by Cutter and Malmgren. It was built in 1910 for a price of $425,000 ($14.7 million in 2025 dollars) and opened in 1911 as the clubhouse for the members-only Spokane Club. A rectangular building with a brick façade it measures 150 feet long along Riverside and 57 feet deep. It has four stories in addition to three basement levels, which are made possible due to its location along the steep and in places precipitous drop to the level of the Spokane River, just a block to the north. The first story is at approximately 1,875 feet above sea level while the river flows at approximately 1,830 feet within one block to the north. Riverside Avenue, to the south, is relatively flat but Main Avenue to the north falls off along that elevation drop from Downtown Spokane into the Peaceful Valley neighborhood.

The building's south and main façade has an extended central entrance area surrounded by six window bays on each side, with brick walls with terra-cotta trim extending to the east and west in both directions. The main story is almost entirely terra-cotta on the exterior while the upper three stories are predominately red brick with white terra-cotta trim. At the entryway on the ground floor are Doric columns supporting a second-story balcony above which Ionic columns lead into a terra-cotta cornice between the third and fourth stories.

As of 2022, the Spokane Club building is the main clubhouse for the Spokane Club, a members-only club providing dining, hospitality and sporting opportunities to the Spokane community.

=== Civic Building ===
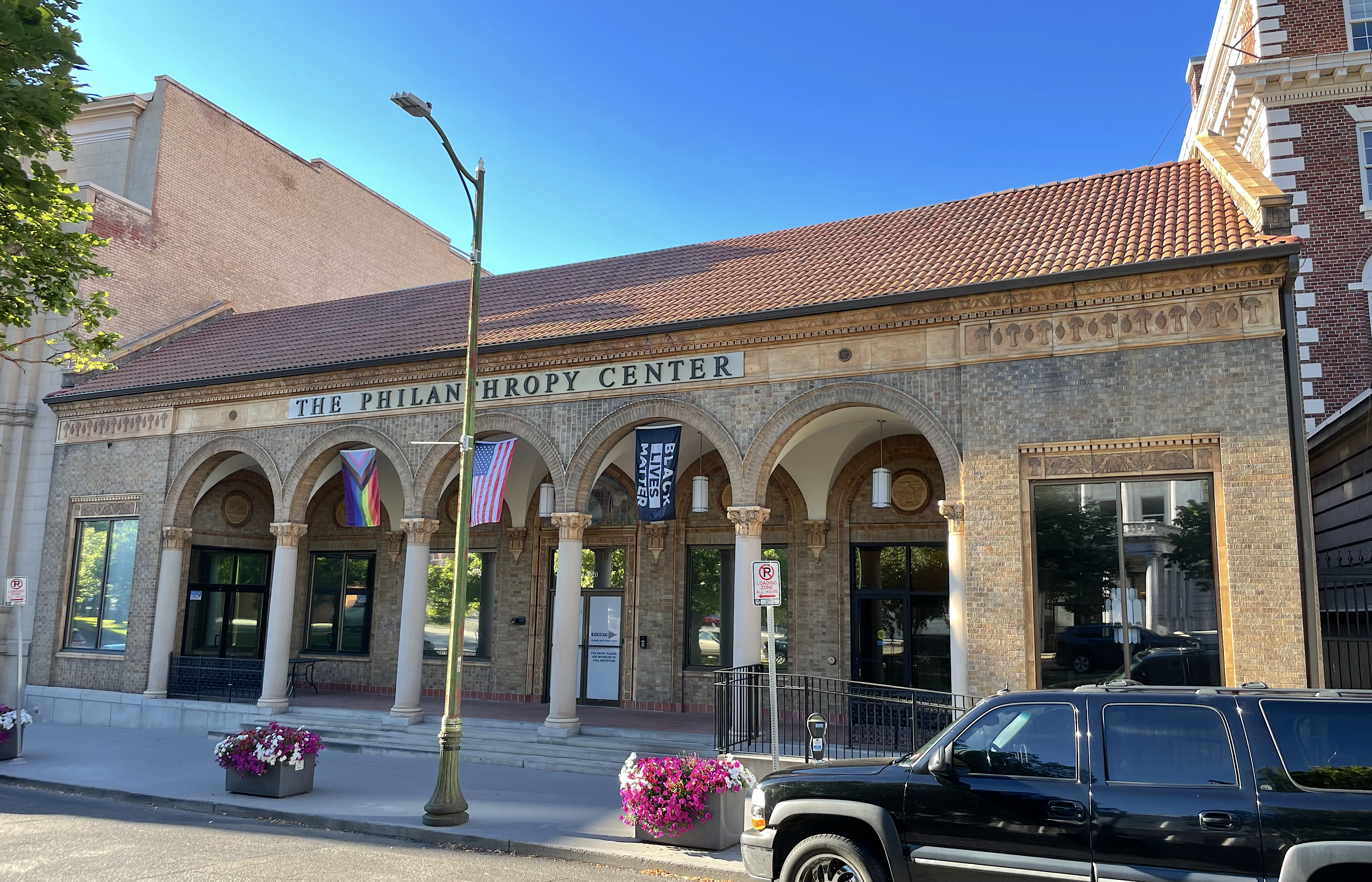
Civic Building

Located at 1020 W. Riverside, the Civic Building, known later as the Chamber of Commerce and as of 2022 as The Philanthropy Center, is a Renaissance Revival building designed by Waterhouse and Price. It was built in 1931 at a cost of $125,000 ($2.65 million in 2025 dollars). It is a rectangular building with roughly 100 feet of façade along Riverside. The structure is reinforced concrete with a façade of multi-colored brick. The building rises one story above Riverside on its southern face but it rises four stories above Main Street on the north. The three basement levels are made possible by the cliff between Riverside and Main that was cut by the adjacent Spokane River. The first floor at Riverside is at approximately 1,885 feet elevation while the river a block away is at approximately 1,720 feet above sea level. The central feature of the Riverside facade is the loggia which houses the main entrance to the building. It is the easternmost of the three buildings in a row along Riverside which feature prominent colonnades along their southern faces.

=== Masonic Temple ===
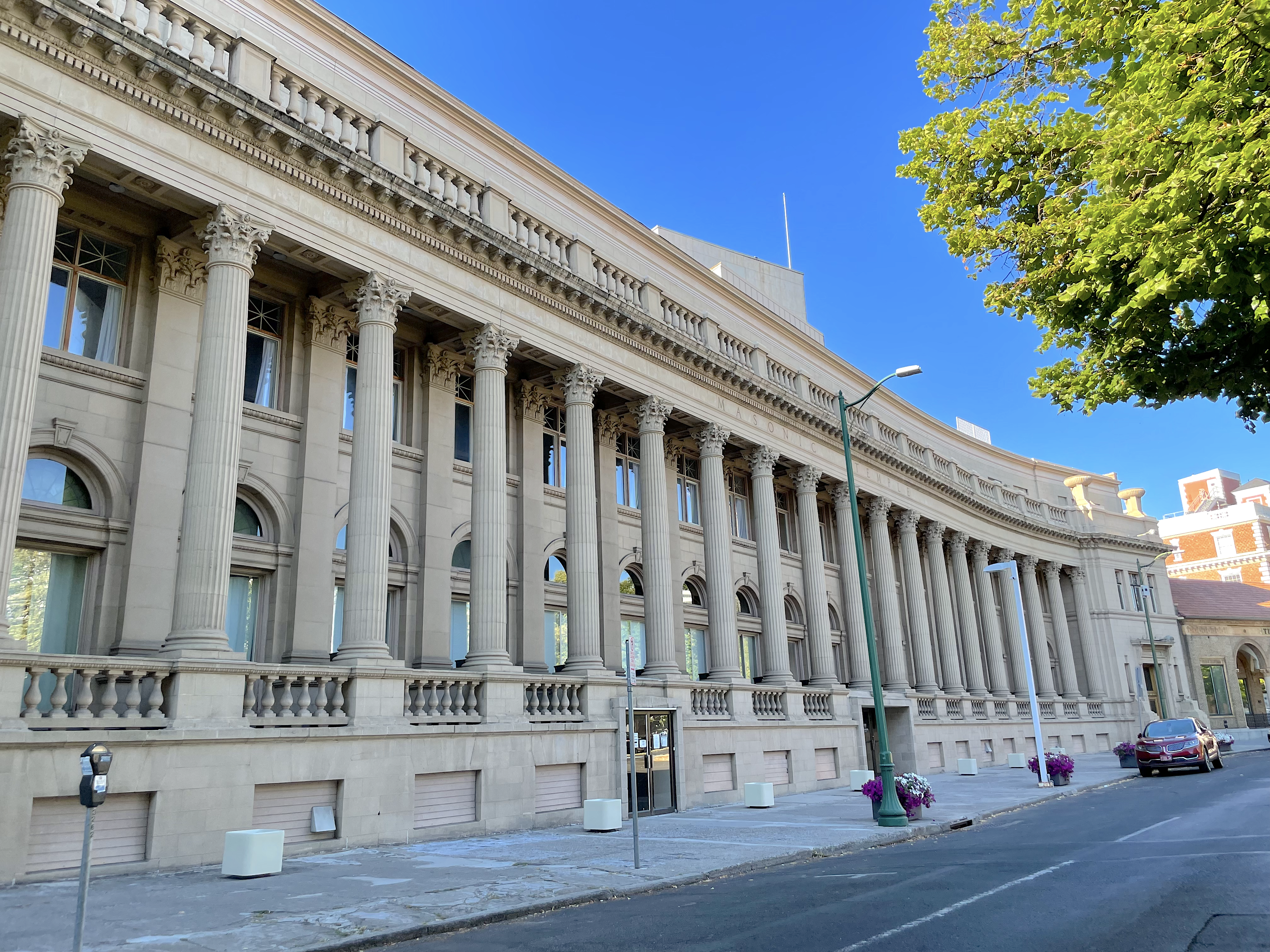
Masonic Temple colonnade

Located at 1108 W. Riverside, the Masonic Temple is a monumental structure built in Neo-Classical Revival and to conform to the City Beautiful movement. The Masonic Temple has a 222-foot length along Riverside, most of which is dominated by a Corinthian colonnade. Above the colonnade a balustrade runs most of the length of the façade Riverside has a curved appearance in this area, but the Masonic Temple is the only building with a curved façade along that stretch. The curve of Riverside gives the building a trapezoidal shape, which has resulted in the interior walls meeting at noticeably few right angles. The building's structure is made of reinforced concrete and rises three stories above Riverside, and five stories in the rear along Main Avenue to the north. The first floor at Riverside is at approximately 1,885 feet elevation while the river a block away is at approximately 1,720 feet above sea level.

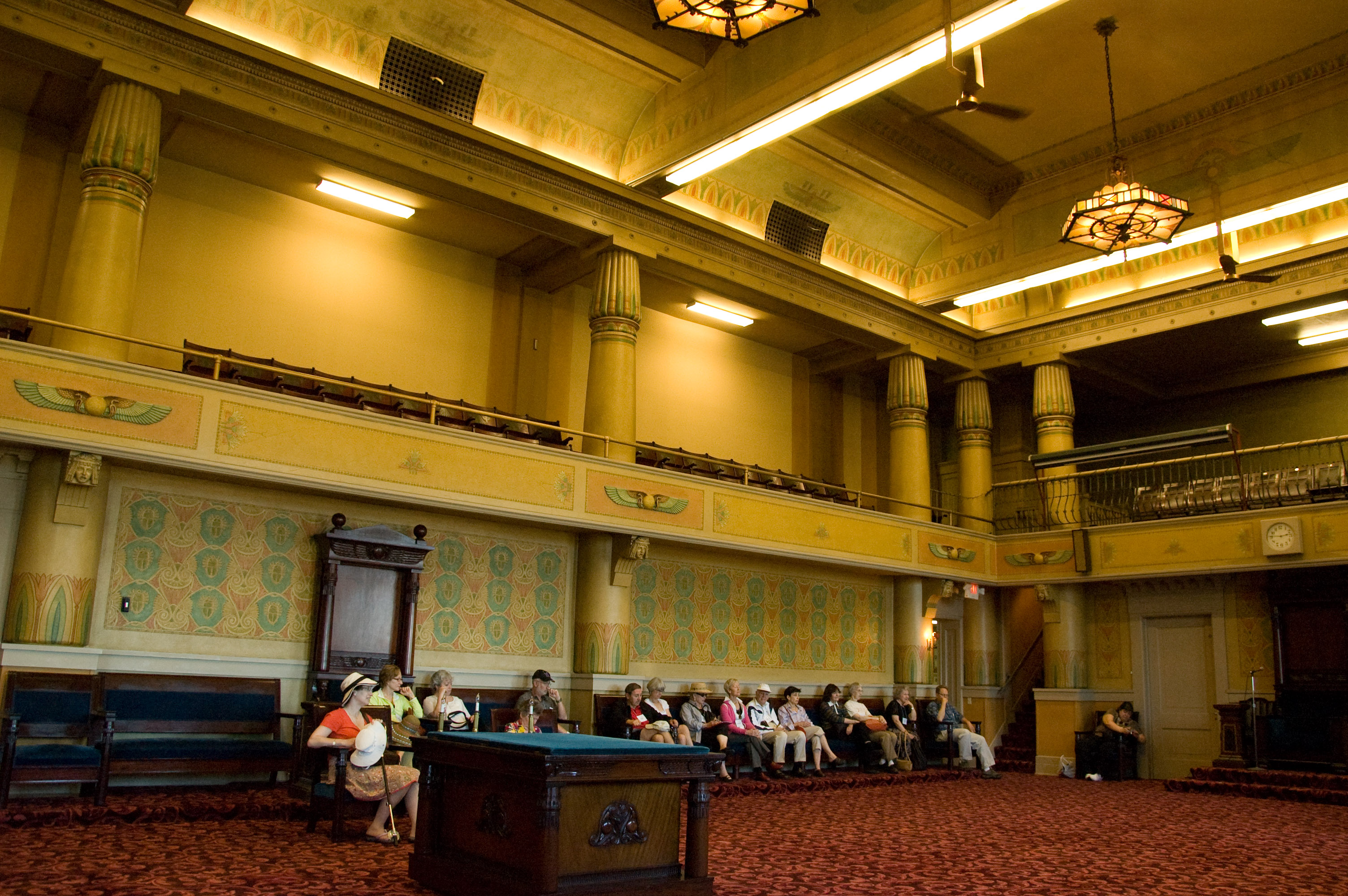
The Masonic Temples' Blue Room

The interior of the building matches the grandeur of the Riverside façade, and maintains the theme of ancient Egyptian style motifs. The ballroom features a spring-supported "floating floor" while the Blue Room features the original red floral carpeting, the same used by Louis Davenport in his elegant Davenport Hotel. A fifth floor skylight that was covered up during World War II was brought back during an early-2000s restoration, allowing it to shine natural light onto the oak staircase leading to the fifth floor. On the fifth floor, the aptly named Falls Room offers views overlooking the Spokane Falls. There is also a 500-seat auditorium with horseshoe seating and a full balcony.

The Masonic Temple was built at a cost of $150,000 ($5.38 million in 2025 dollars) and became operational in 1905. President Teddy Roosevelt, a Mason himself, was present at the groundbreaking and performed the ceremonial shoveling of the first dirt. Expansion of the building took place between 1924 and 1925, spurred on by membership growth in the city's Masonic lodge. Expansion saw the original five bays of the colonnade extended along Riverside to the present 19-bay colonnade. An attic level was added at this time as well. The building was sold for $1.1 million ($1.52 million in 2025 dollars) to an Australian business man in 2013. As of 2022, the Masonic Temple building is used as an event hall.

=== Elks Temple ===
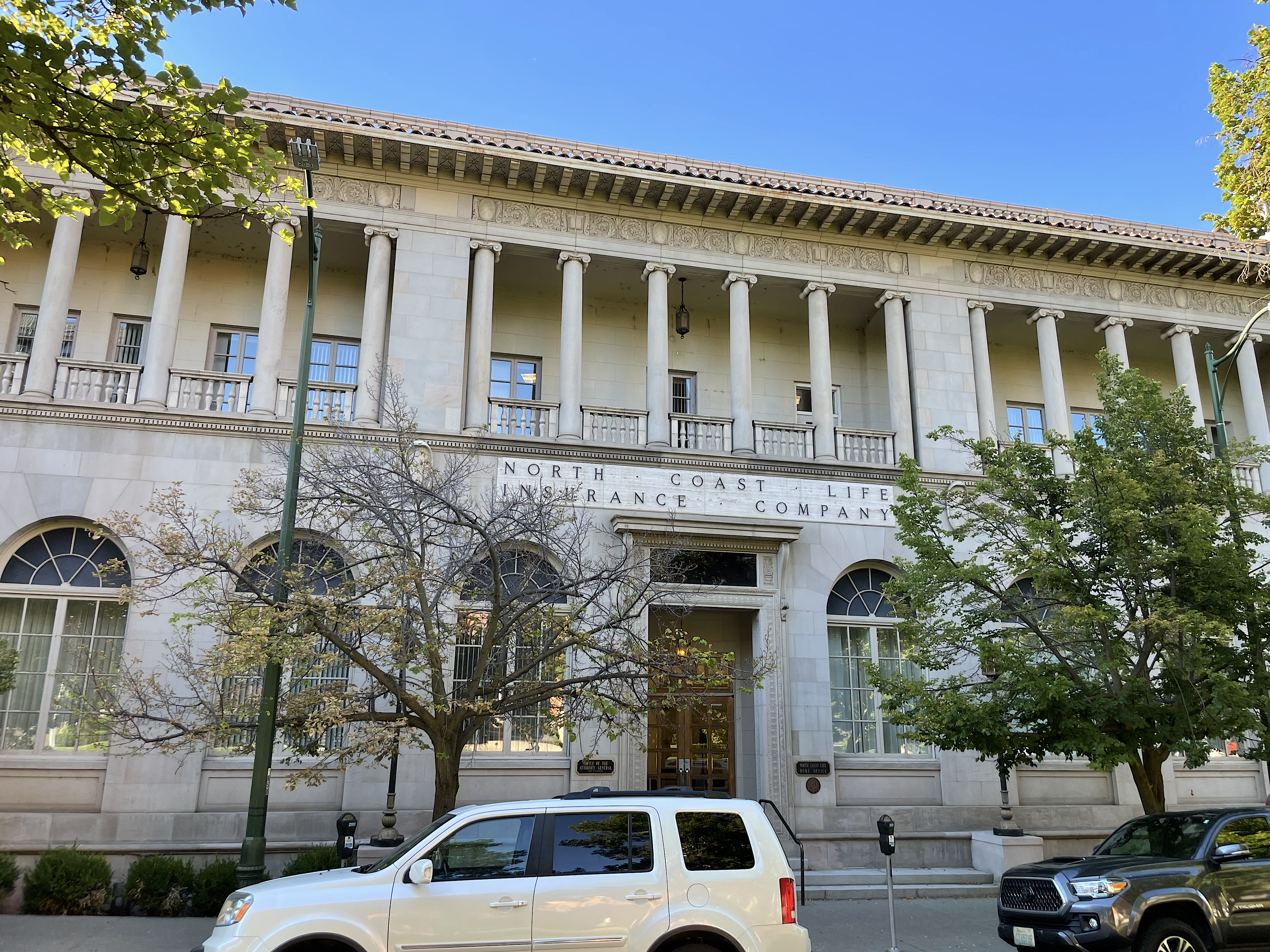
Elks Temple

Located at 1116 W Riverside, the Elks Temple is a Renaissance Revival building completed in 1921 at a cost of $200,000 ($3.61 million in 2025 dollars). Its design is attributed to a little-known architect named Edward J. Baume, though renowned architect Kirtland Cutter has also been attached to the building's design. It is a rectangular building made of reinforced concrete with smooth sandstone on the exterior. Atop the façade runs a decorative frieze made of tile. An Ionic colonnade runs along the second story exterior, continuing the theme of exterior colonnades that began with the Civic Building on the east and continued through the Masonic Temple to the Elks Temple. A balustrade runs between each column. The ground level features a recessed central entryway surrounded on each side by four bays with arched windows extending approximately 110 feet along Riverside.

Originally built to serve as a meetinghouse for the Spokane chapter of the Benevolent and Protective Order of Elks, a fraternal order which had a membership of nearly 8,000 in the Spokane area at the time of construction. Among Elks clubs of the time, Spokane's had the second-highest membership rate behind only the chapter in Los Angeles. Membership dwindled in later years, and the club moved to a smaller facility in Spokane Valley. The building was purchased by North Coast Life Insurance in 1981 and restored in 1983. The renovation work earned the Award of Outstanding Merit from the Washington Trust for Historic Preservation.

=== Smith Funeral Home and Apartment Building ===
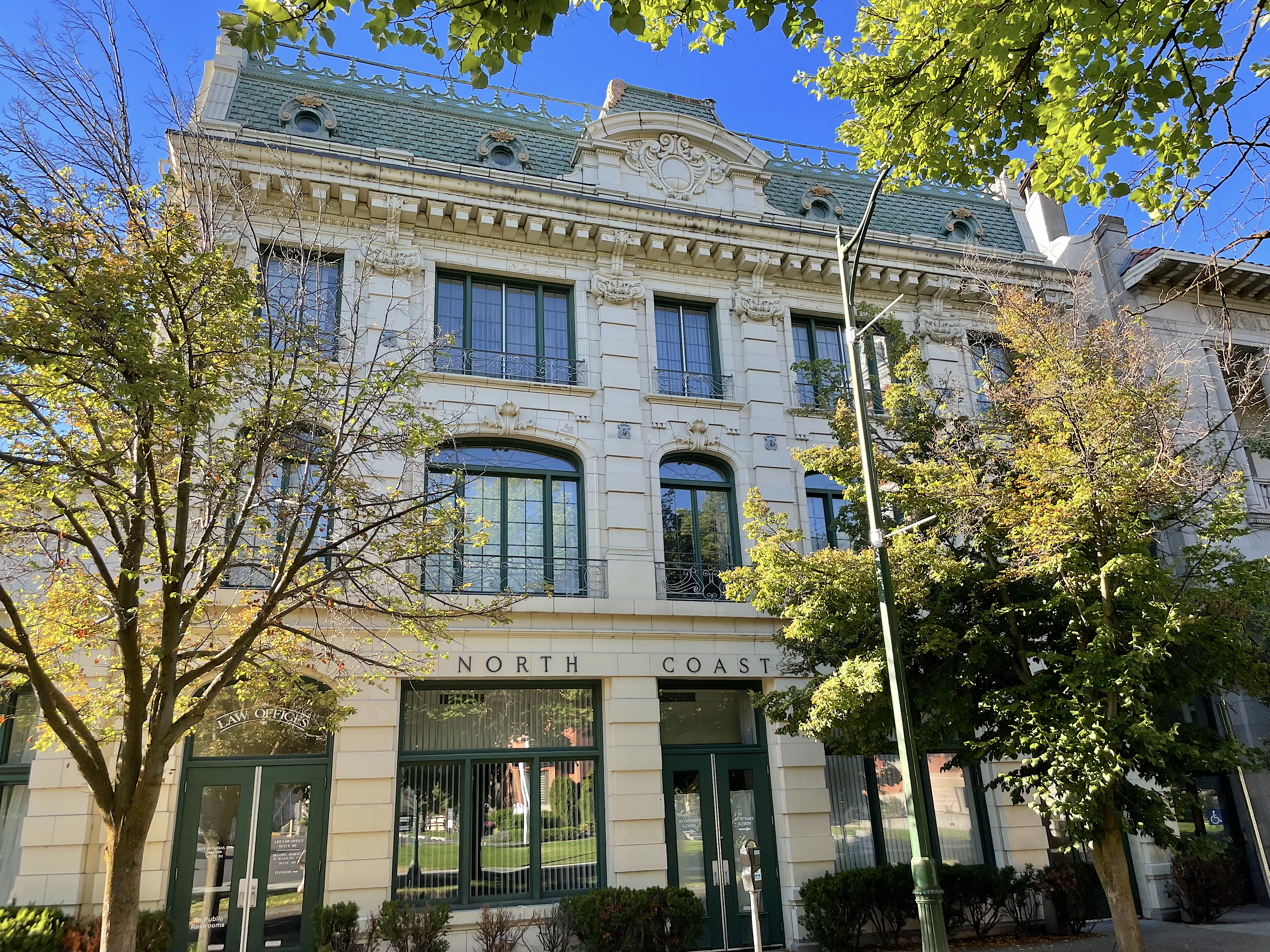
Smith Funeral Home

Located at 1124 W. Riverside, the former Smith Funeral Home is a Baroque Revival structure built in 1921 at a cost of $130,000 ($2.35 million in 2025 dollars). It was designed by local architectural firm Jones and Levesque. The four-story building is rectangular in plan and composed of reinforced concrete and brick masonry. The façade along Riverside stretches for approximately 50 feet and is covered with cream colored terra cotta, while the side walls are pressed red brick that has been painted over. The Riverside façade is composed of five bays containing windows or doors. The central and exterior bays are thinner compared to the wider second and fourth bays. On the ground level the first, third and fifth bays contain doors. Every other bay contains windows, with arched windows on the second floor and rectangular windows in the rest. A mansard roof of stamped copper sits atop the façade, above a bracketed cornice and balustrade. In the center is a domed pavilion with an arched pediment. On either side of the dome are a pair of oeil-de-boeuf dormer windows.

Originally constructed to house apartments and a funeral home. The fourth floor was to contain laundry and work rooms, with apartments on the second and third stories and the funeral home on the ground level and in the basement. The Smith Funeral Home was the oldest operational funeral home in Spokane at the time of its closing in the late 1970s. The building was left vacant for a decade after the closure, and threatened with demolition, until North Coast Life Insurance purchased it along with the neighboring Elks Temple in the early 1980s and set out to do rehabilitation work on the two buildings. Subsequently, the building has been commonly known as North Coast Plaza.

=== Roman Catholic Chancery Building ===
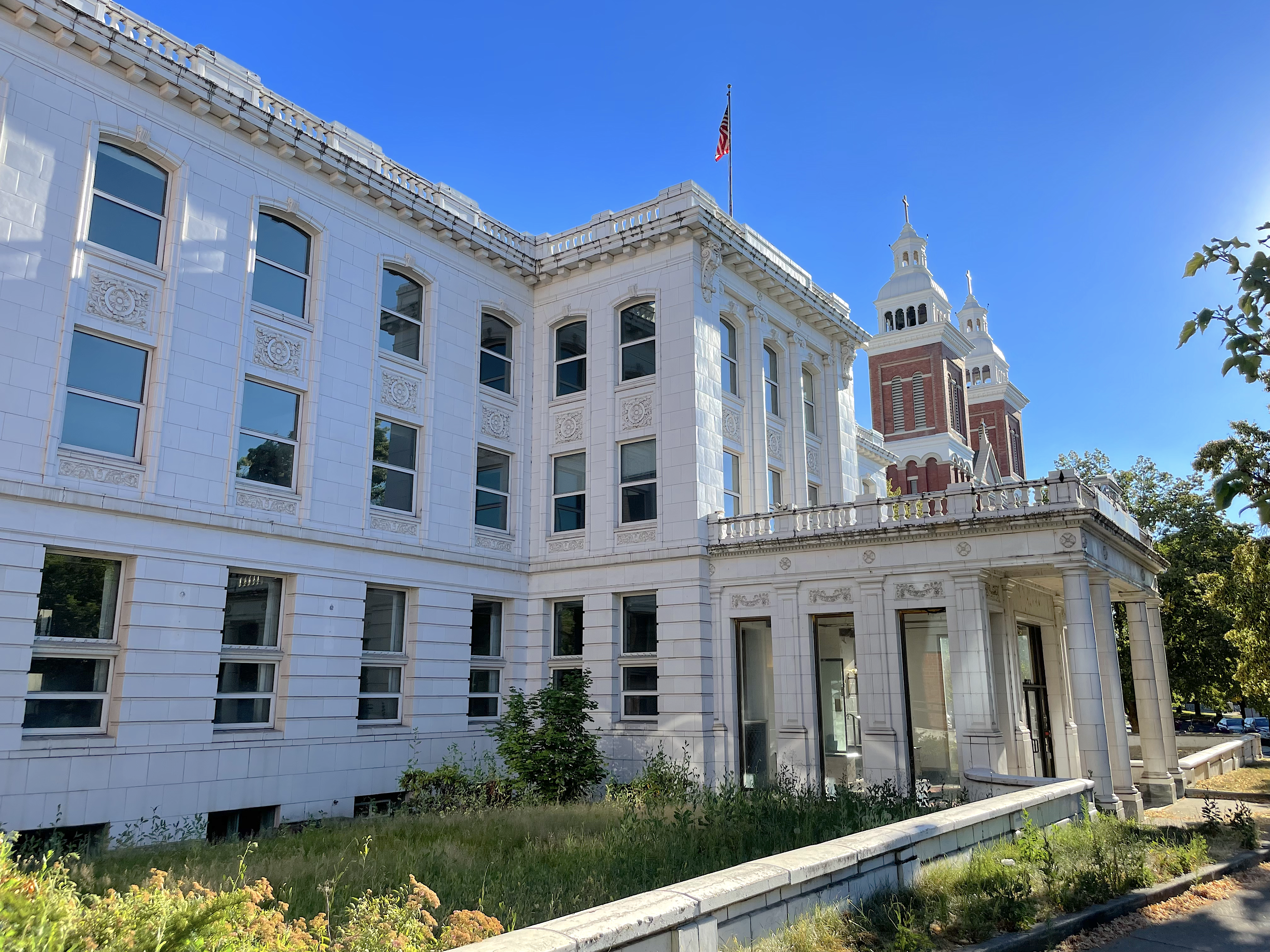
Chancery Building

Located at 1023 W. Riverside, the Chancery Building was constructed in 1925 for the Western Union Life Insurance Company at a cost of $260,000 ($4.77 million in 2025 dollars). It was designed by local architect G.A. Pehrson in a Renaissance Revival and Neo-Classical style with a reinforced concrete and brick masonry structure. The façade along Riverside and Madison is covered in white terra cotta. The H-shaped building has three stories and a semi-daylight basement.

The Chancery Building was used as office space for life insurance companies until 1966 when it was sold to the Roman Catholic Diocese of Spokane. It served as the Diocese's headquarters for 40 years until being sold in 2006. The sale of the building was part of a claims settlement to pay victims of child sexual abuse by priests and clergy. After the sale, the diocese remained as tenants of the building until 2019. Sitting empty, the building was listed on the Washington Trust for Historic Preservation's list of most endangered places in the state in 2020. In 2021, plans were announced to demolish the building and replace it with a modern, 40 to 50 unit apartment building. The property was purchased by a subsidiary of the local Cowles Company, which among other things own and operate the local daily newspaper, The Spokesman-Review which operates out of the Review Building one block to the east. The company owns the entire block on which the Chancery Building is located, with employee parking to the south of the building and the former printing facility to the east. In January 2022, the Spokane Historic Landmarks Commission voted unanimously to require additional design review of the proposal, putting the plan on hold. The commission cited the "very modern" nature of the proposal as being out of touch with the character of the area.

=== Our Lady of Lourdes Roman Catholic Cathedral ===
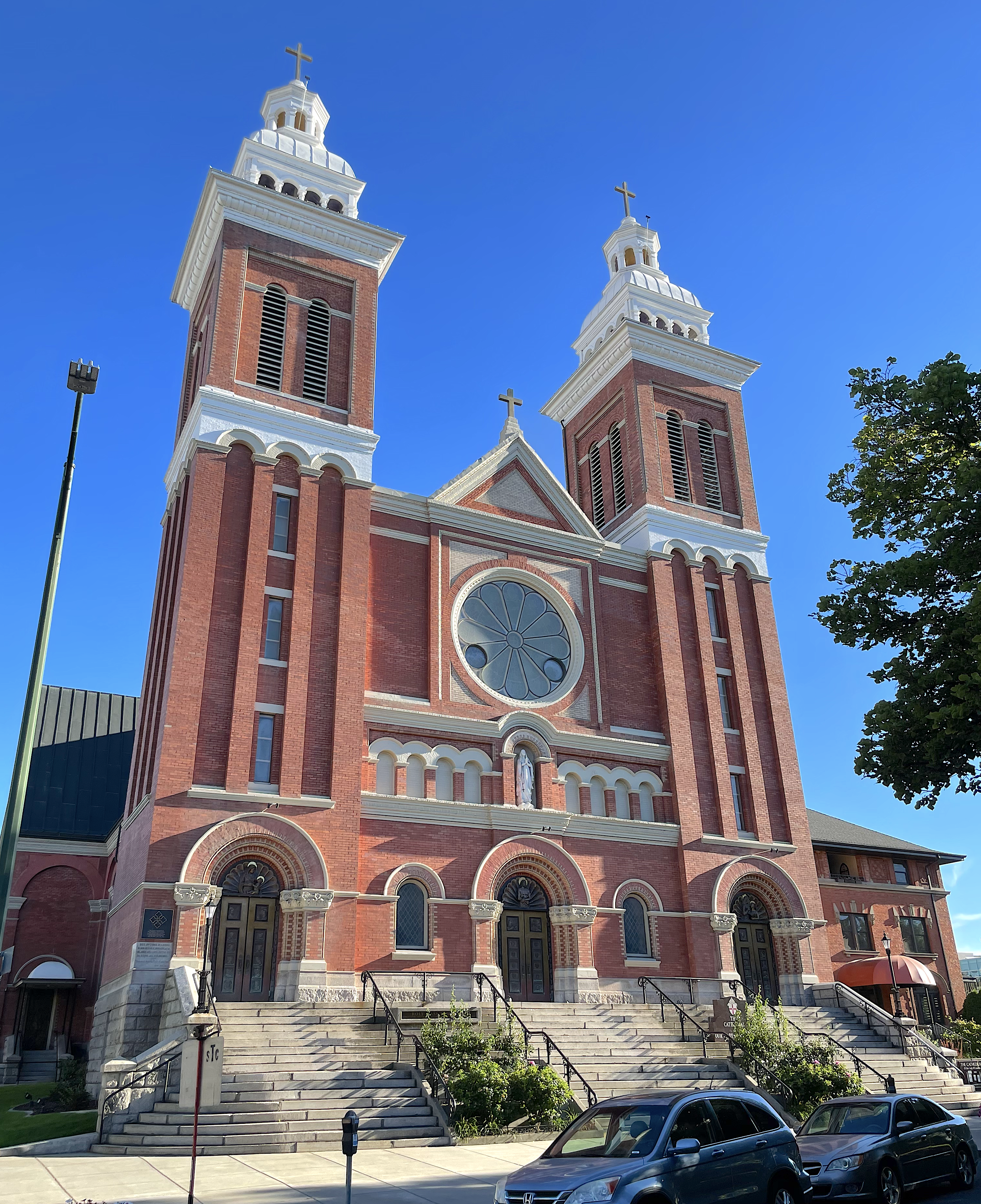
Our Lady of Lourdes

Located at 1115 W. Riverside, Our Lady of Lourdes is a Catholic cathedral built between 1902 and 1907, and dedicated in 1908, though it would not be granted cathedral status until 1914. Church services began in 1903, when the basement superstructure was finished, but still four years before construction as a whole would be completed. It was designed in Romanesque Revival style by local firm Preusse and Zittel with modifications by another local firm, Julian and Williams. It measures roughly 80 feet wide along Riverside and 172 feet deep, with a height of 125 feet at the bell towers. The structure is reinforced concrete and brick masonry with a rosate brick veneer and white terra cotta trim. Centrally located above the Narthex facing Riverside is a traditional large wheel window.

The main central entrance, and matching entrances at the base of each bell tower, are elevated above the level of Riverside Avenue, which can be reached via staircase. All three are identical, round-arched portal style entrances. Sometime after construction was complete, the original doors were replaced with doors made of bronze and weighing a combined total of three tons. Inside, the nave, aisles and transept are spanned by Romanesque ribbed barrel vaults. Support piers are decorated with pilasters to imitate the clustered pillars of medieval churches. The cathedral features Bavarian stained glass windows depicting Judeo-Christian history and tradition.

The church underwent an interior remodel in 1971, and in 2021 there was a rehabilitation project focusing on the exterior and bell towers, which caused the closure of the intersection of Riverside and Madison for two weeks.

Visually distinct from the rest of the historic district due to its height, the cathedral ranks as the 16th tallest building in Spokane and the second tallest church in the city behind only the Cathedral of St. John the Evangelist in the city's Rockwood neighborhood.

=== San Marco Apartments ===
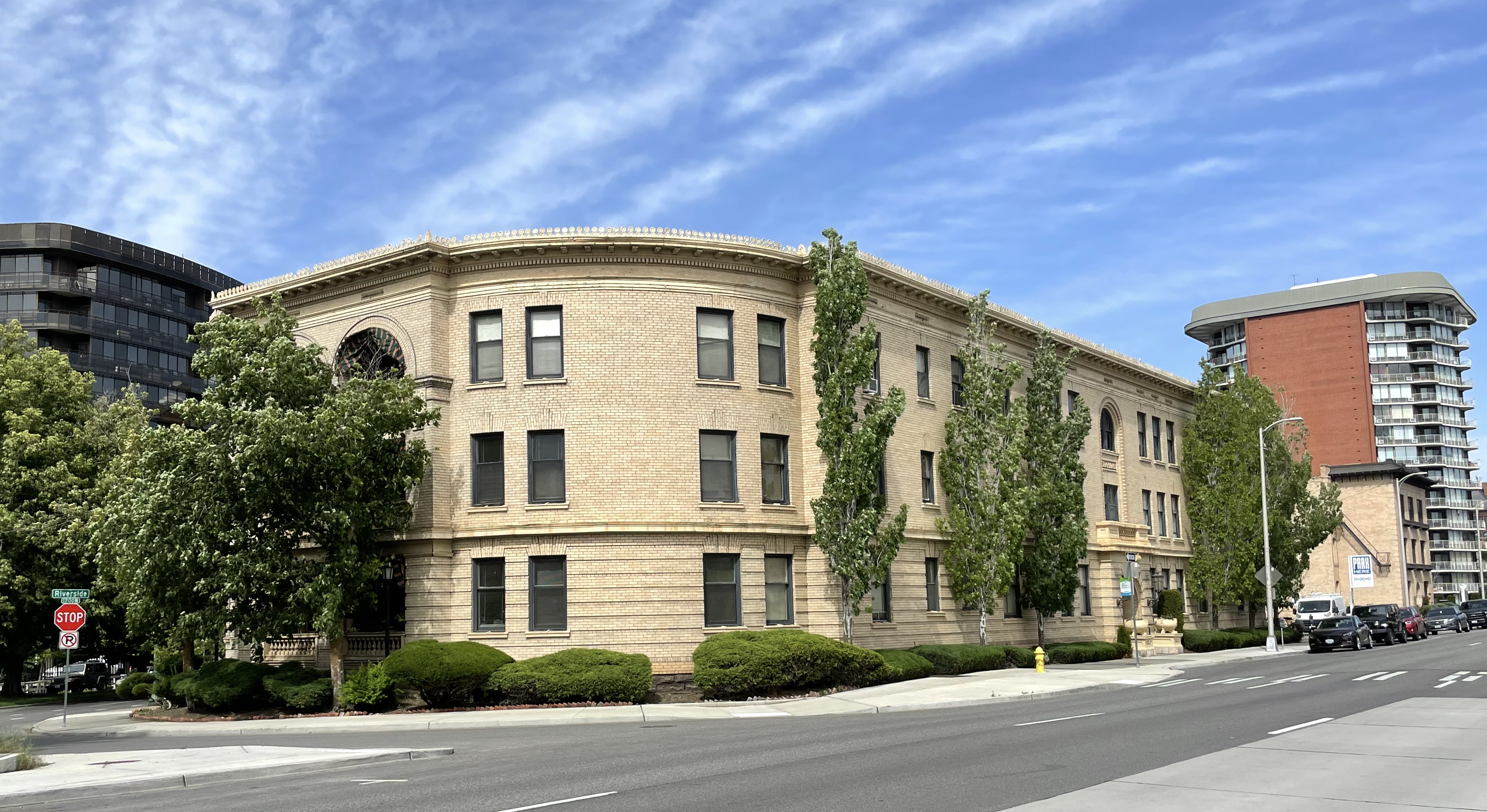
San Marco

Located at 1229 W. Riverside, the San Marco is a historic Renaissance Revival apartment building designed by Albert Held and built in 1904. Shaped like a wedge, it is a made up of two wings, one that stretches roughly 200 feet along Riverside and the other that runs roughly 135 feet along Sprague Avenue. Riverside and Sprague are normally parallel to each other, but as Riverside curves along the ridge leading down to the Spokane River, it trends to the south and intersects with Sprague at the west end of the San Marco. It is a brick masonry structure with buff-colored brick on the exterior above a sandstone foundation. A pair of loggia are located at the corner where the two arms come together.

Initially listed on the NRHP as a contributing property to the Riverside Avenue Historic District, it was listed a second time as one of four historically notable apartment homes in Spokane designed by Albert Held including the Amman, Breslin and Knickerbocker.

=== Carnegie Library ===
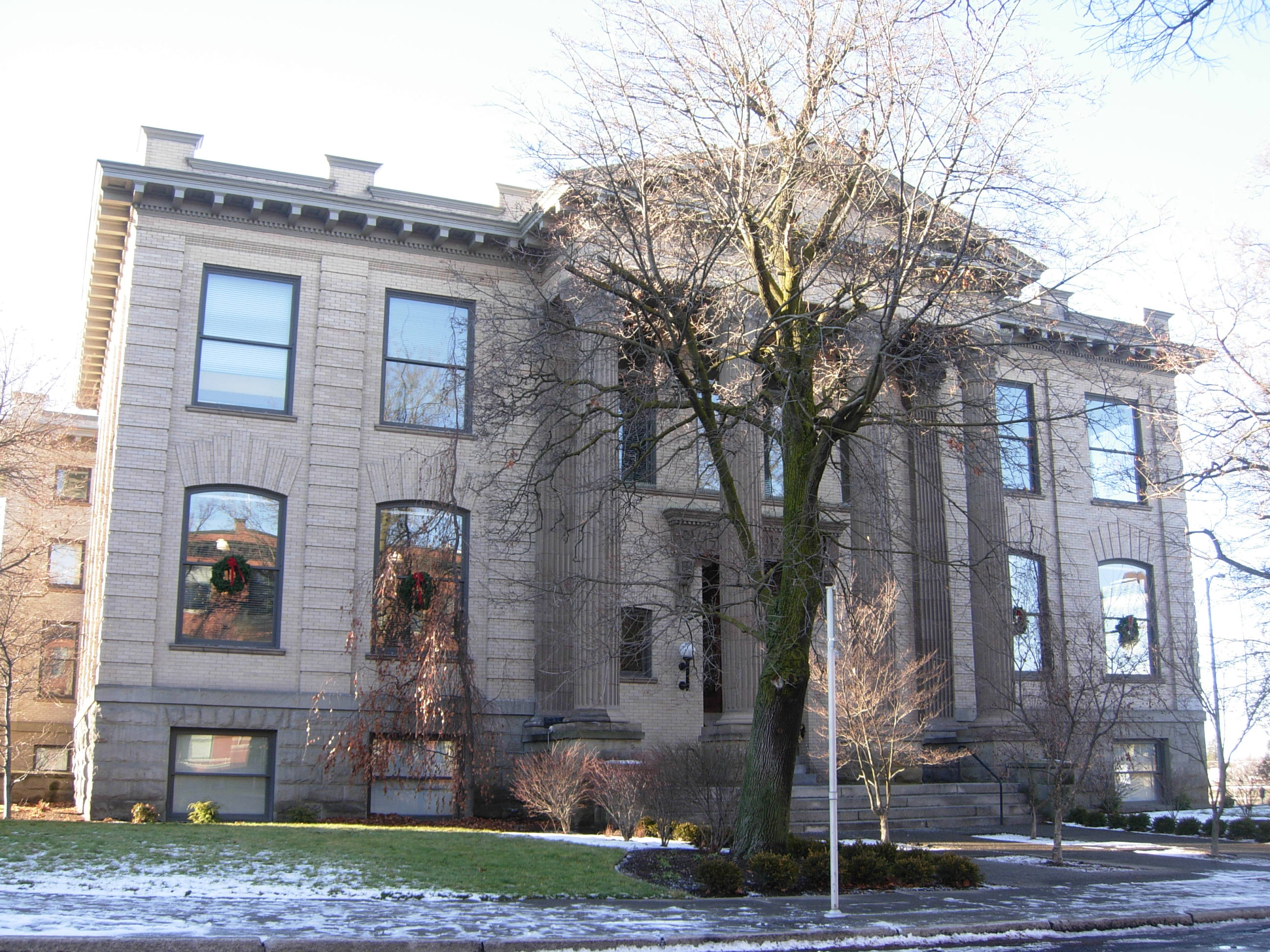
Carnegie Library

Located at 10 S. Cedar Street, the former Carnegie Library was built in 1905 at a cost of $100,000 ($3.58 million in 2025 dollars). It was designed by local architects Herman Preusse and Julius Zittel. Rectangular in plan, it is a two-story building with a daylight basement and a neo-classical portico. Dark rock-faced masonry serves as the foundation atop which the façade is composed of gray-tan brick. The original building was 50 by 70 feet, but a later expansion to the rear added an additional 42 by 72 feet was built. The main entrance is a two-story portico with Corinthian columns.

While not located on Riverside, the building is coterminous with the rest of the historic district. As Riverside curves southward along the bluff cut by the Spokane river and away from its east–west position in the street grid, it eventually intersects with Sprague Avenue. Sprague is the east–west street immediately south of Riverside, and Riverside's intersection with it comes at the location where Cedar Street naturally intersects with Sprague. The parkway that runs along Riverside through the historic district is continued for one block along Cedar from Riverside/Sprague on the north to First Avenue on the south. That is the block on which the Carnegie Library is located.

The building served as Spokane's main library until 1963 when demand outgrew the size of the building and the main library was moved to a larger facility. Afterwards the building changed hands numerous times until going into default and falling into city ownership. It sat vacant from 1983 until 1992 when it was purchased by Integrus Architecture. Integrus renovated the building and has uses it as the firm's office space.

=== Secondary properties ===
In addition to the nine primary contributing properties listed above, there are five properties listed as secondary properties in the district. The Rectory Building at Our Lady of Lourdes Catholic Cathedral, located at 1115 W. Riverside, immediately west of the cathedral, was built in 1910. At 1203 W. Riverside is the former Knights of Pythias Hall, built in 1911. At 1227 W. Riverside, immediately east of the San Marco, is the Edwidge Apartments, built between 1908 and 1910. At 1214 W. Sprague, to the east of the San Marco and south of the Edwidge, is the Myrtle Apartments, built in 1906. At 5 S. Cedar, across the street from the Carnegie Library, is the former Sunshine and Herbert Apartments, now known as the Buena Vista, built in 1905.

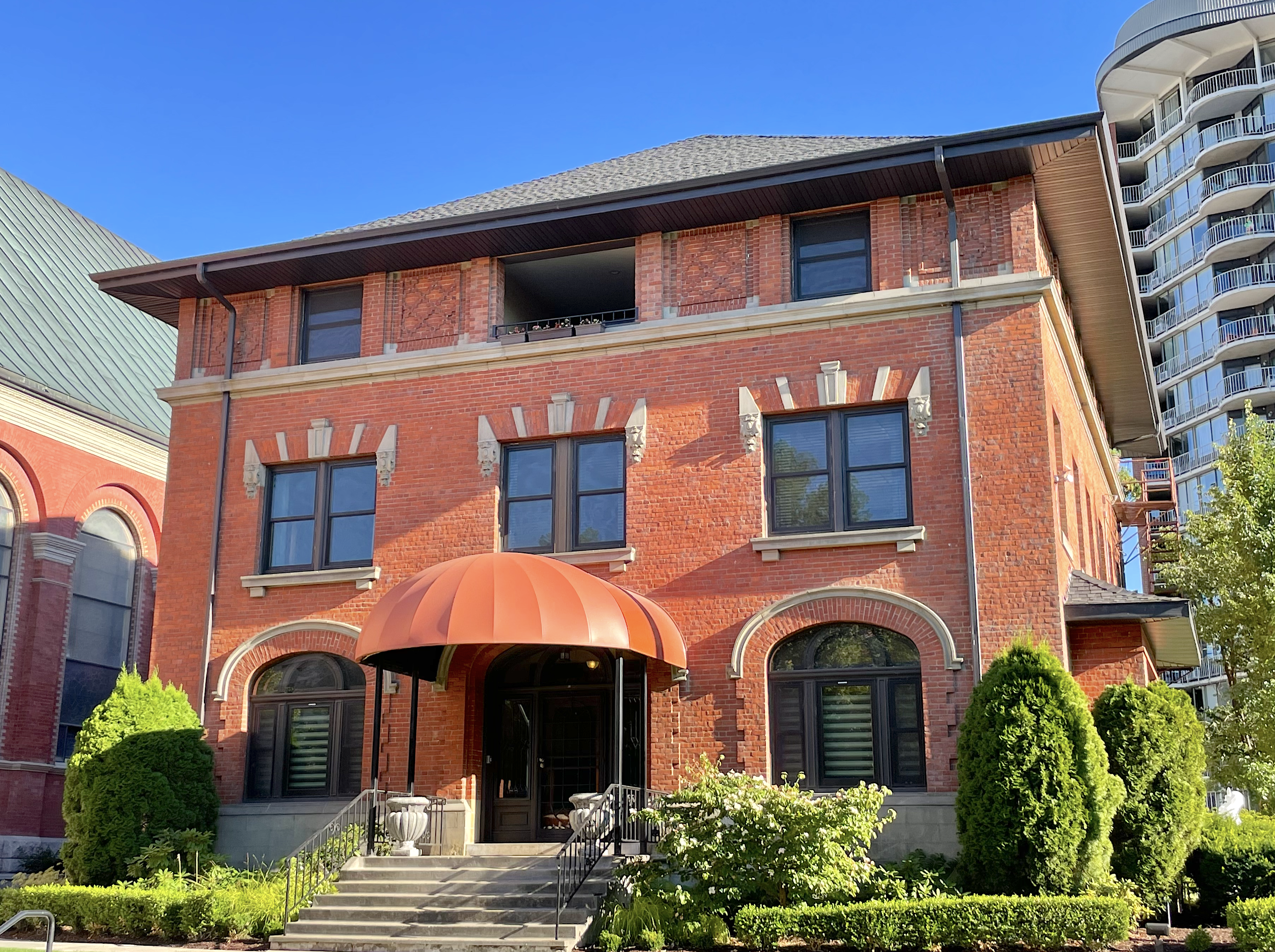
Rectory Building

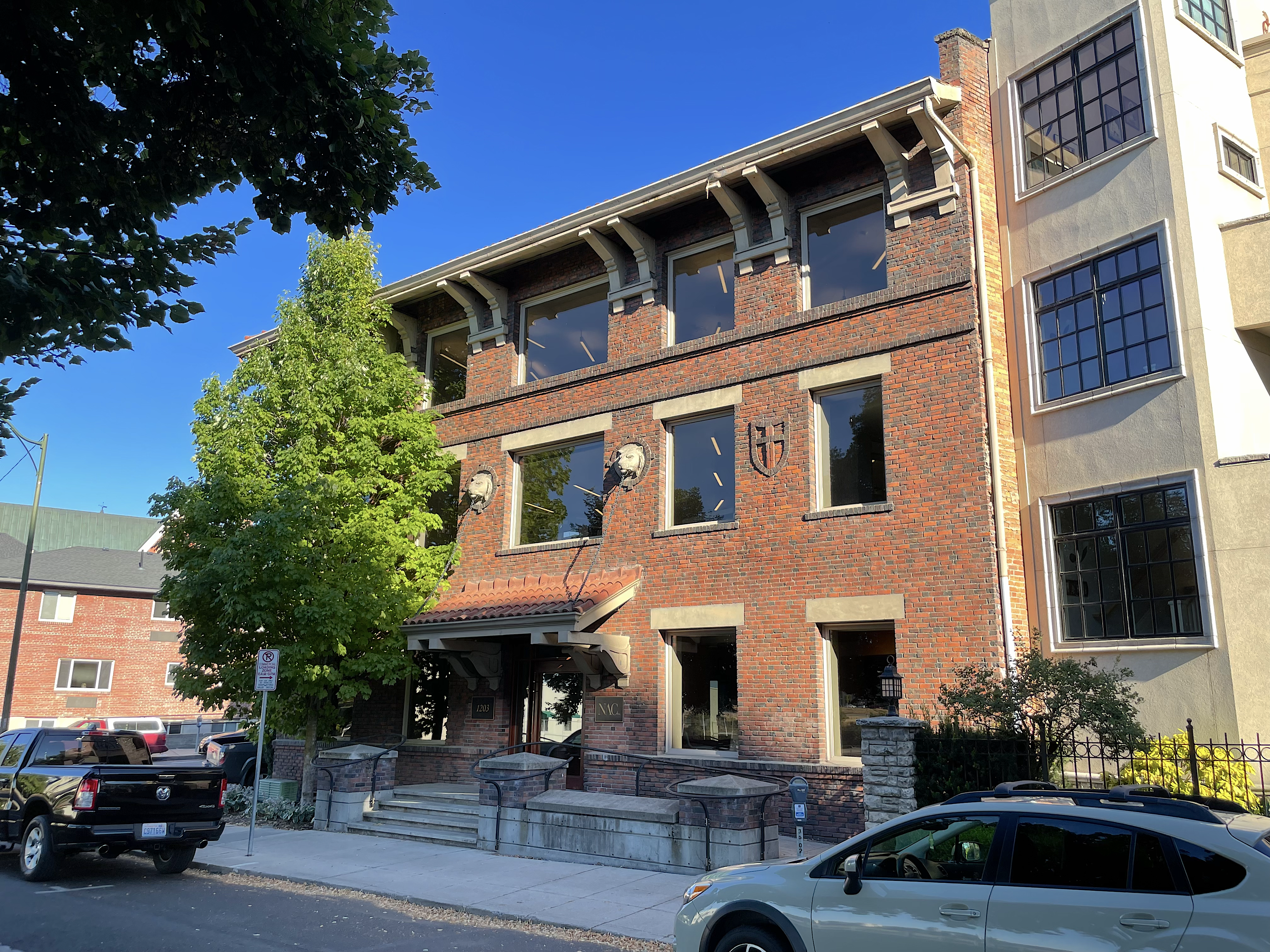
Knights of Pythias Hall

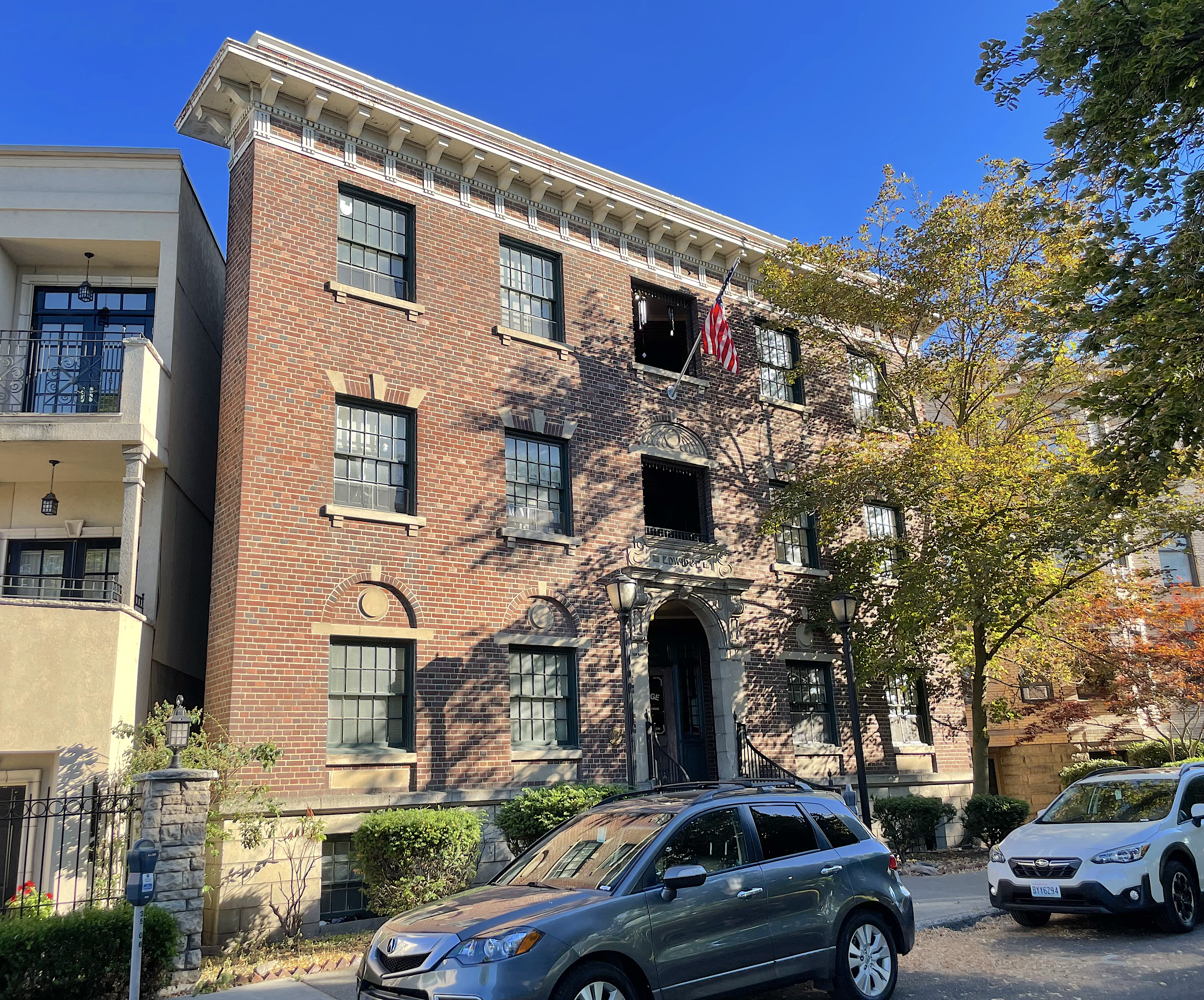
Edwidge Apartments

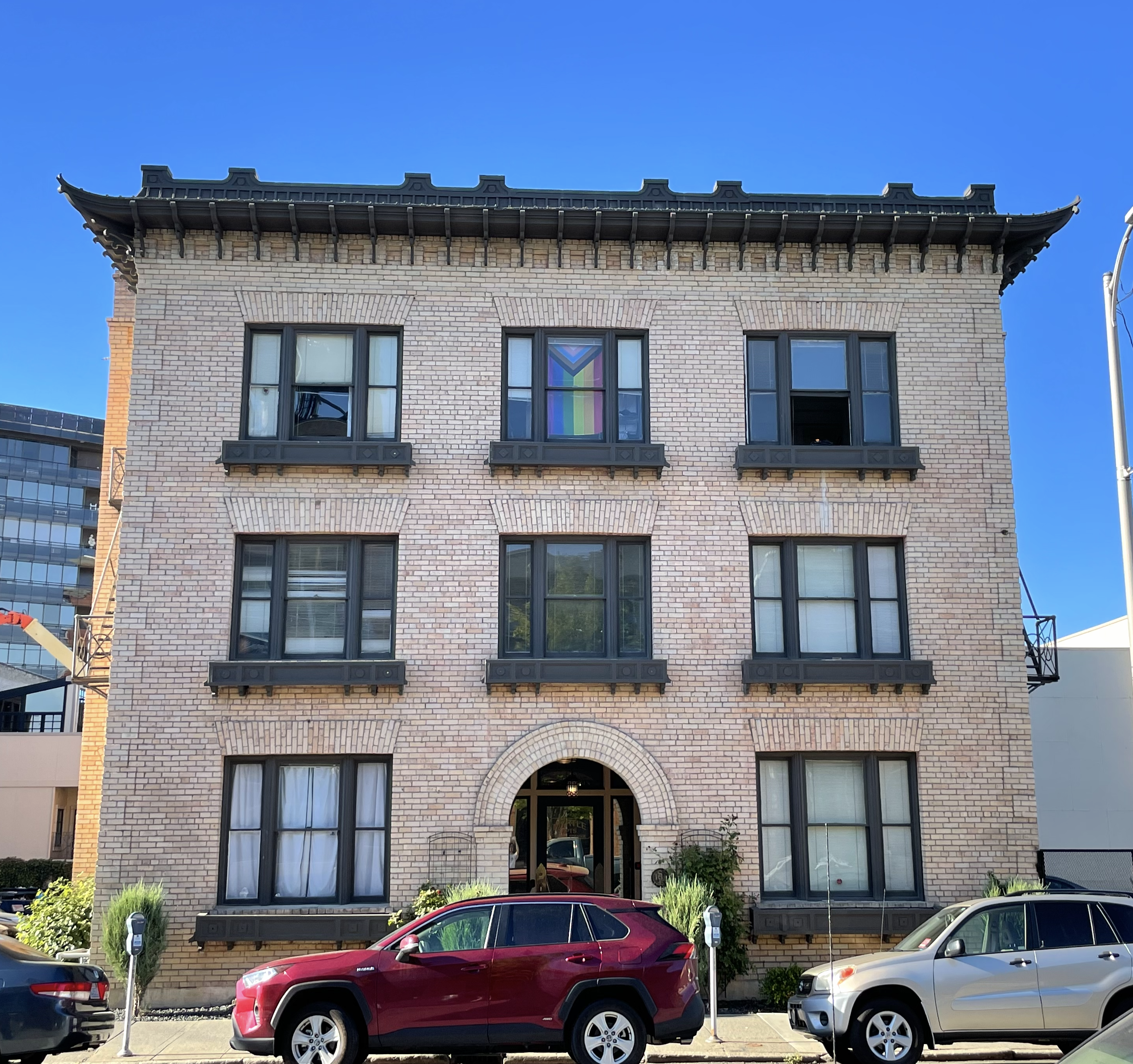
Myrtle Apartments

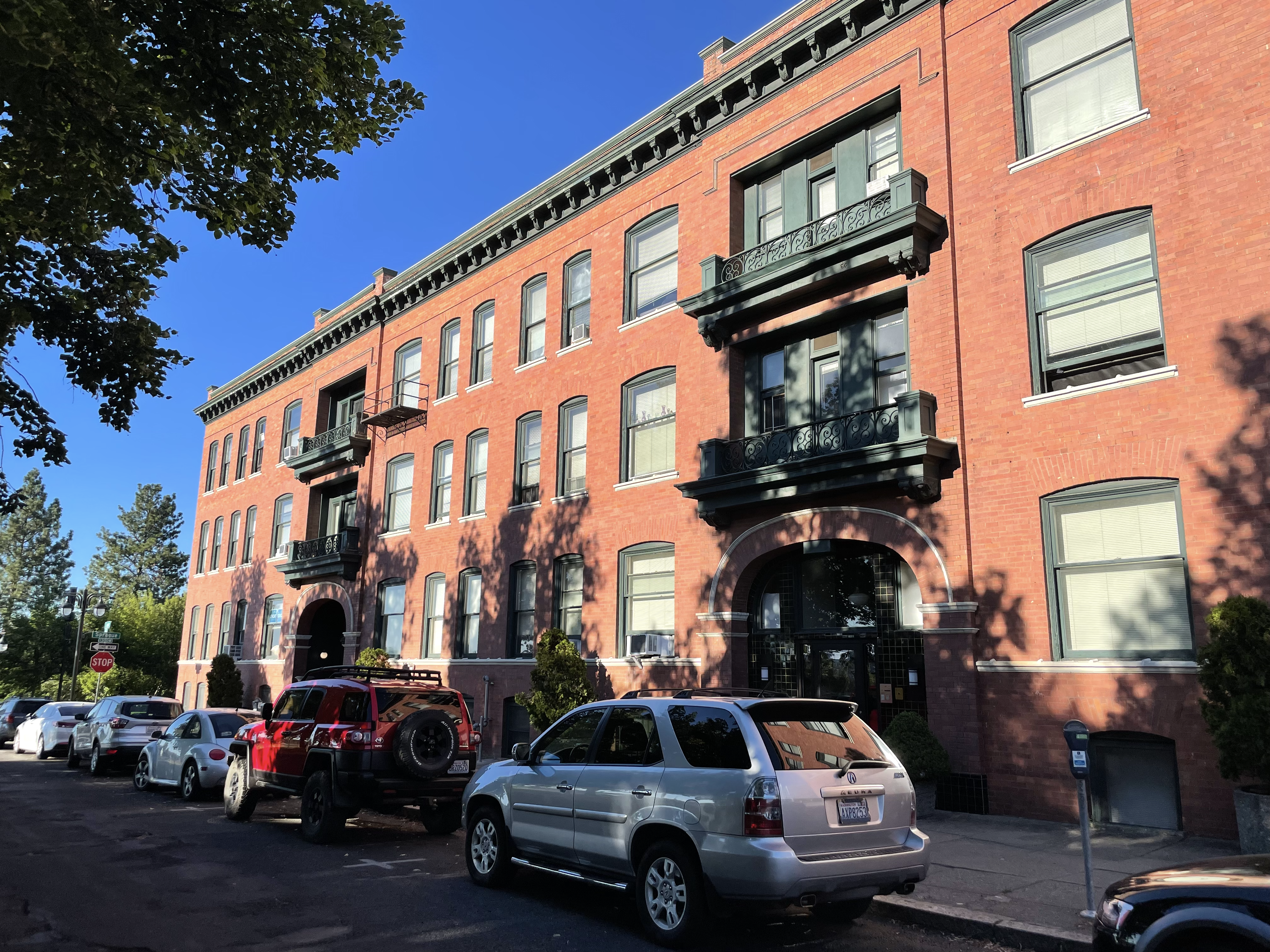
Sunshine and Herbert Apartments

== Modern incursions ==
The district, especially along Riverside, has largely retained its historical character, though there have been some instances of buildings being demolished and new properties being constructed that do not match the district's character.

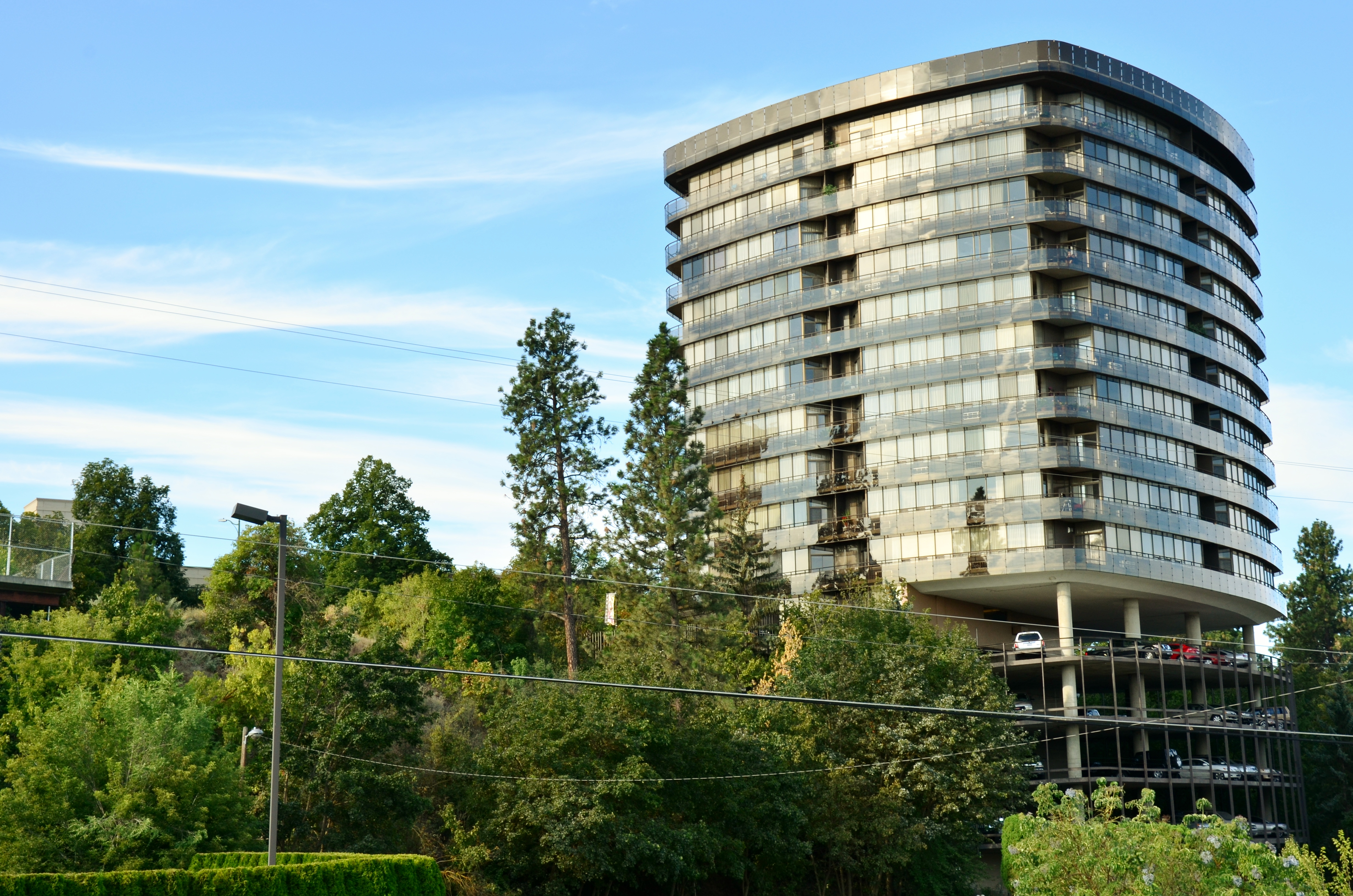
Riverfalls Building from Main Street

In 1973, the 15-story Riverfalls Tower was built at 1224 W. Riverside, across the street from the San Marco and Edwidge Buildings. It is distinct compared to the rest of the district for its sleek, glass and steel exterior that curves around all four sides of the building. It is also a high-rise building, unlike the rest of the structures in the area with the exception of the cathedral's bell towers. Riverfalls Tower rises 11 stories above Riverside and includes a five-story parking structure below. Interestingly, though it is considered a modern incursion into the national historic district, the building was named to the local Spokane Register of Historic Places in 2021.

In 1998, condominium housing was constructed at 1223 W. Riverside, between the Knights of Pythias Hall and Edwidge Building. While more recently constructed than even the Riverfalls Tower across the street, these condominiums blend into the historic character and nature of the district. At three stories tall, they match the elevation of surrounding buildings. Additionally, as was the case when the historic apartment buildings surrounding them were built, these homes were built for higher-income residents.

On the eastern edge of the district, several early 20th-century structures were demolished in the mid-20th century to make way for parking for the Fox Theater, located south on the other side of Sprague. The parking lot has subsequently been replaced by print facilities for The Spokesman-Review newspaper.

== Historical images ==
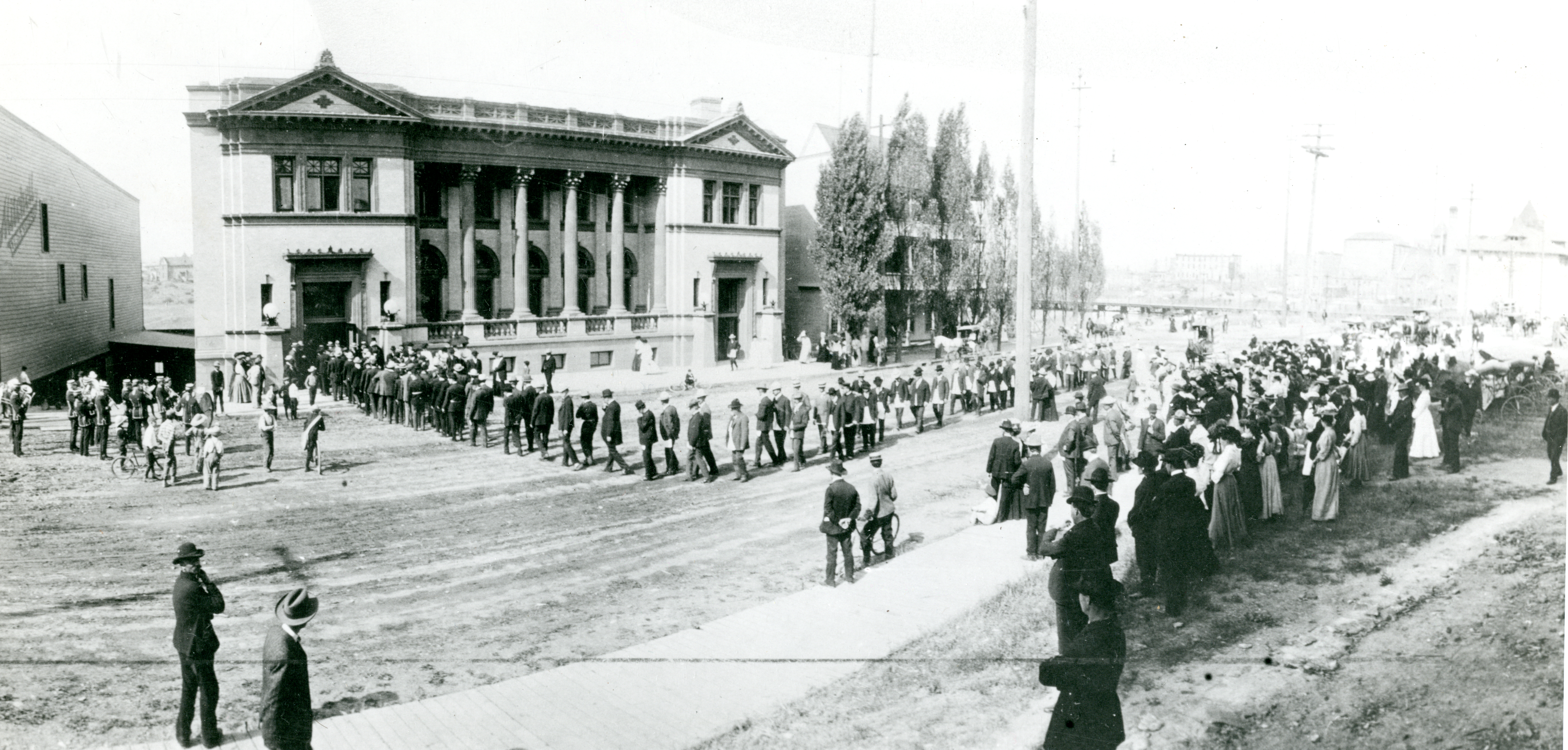
Masonic Temple prior to expansion, 1905

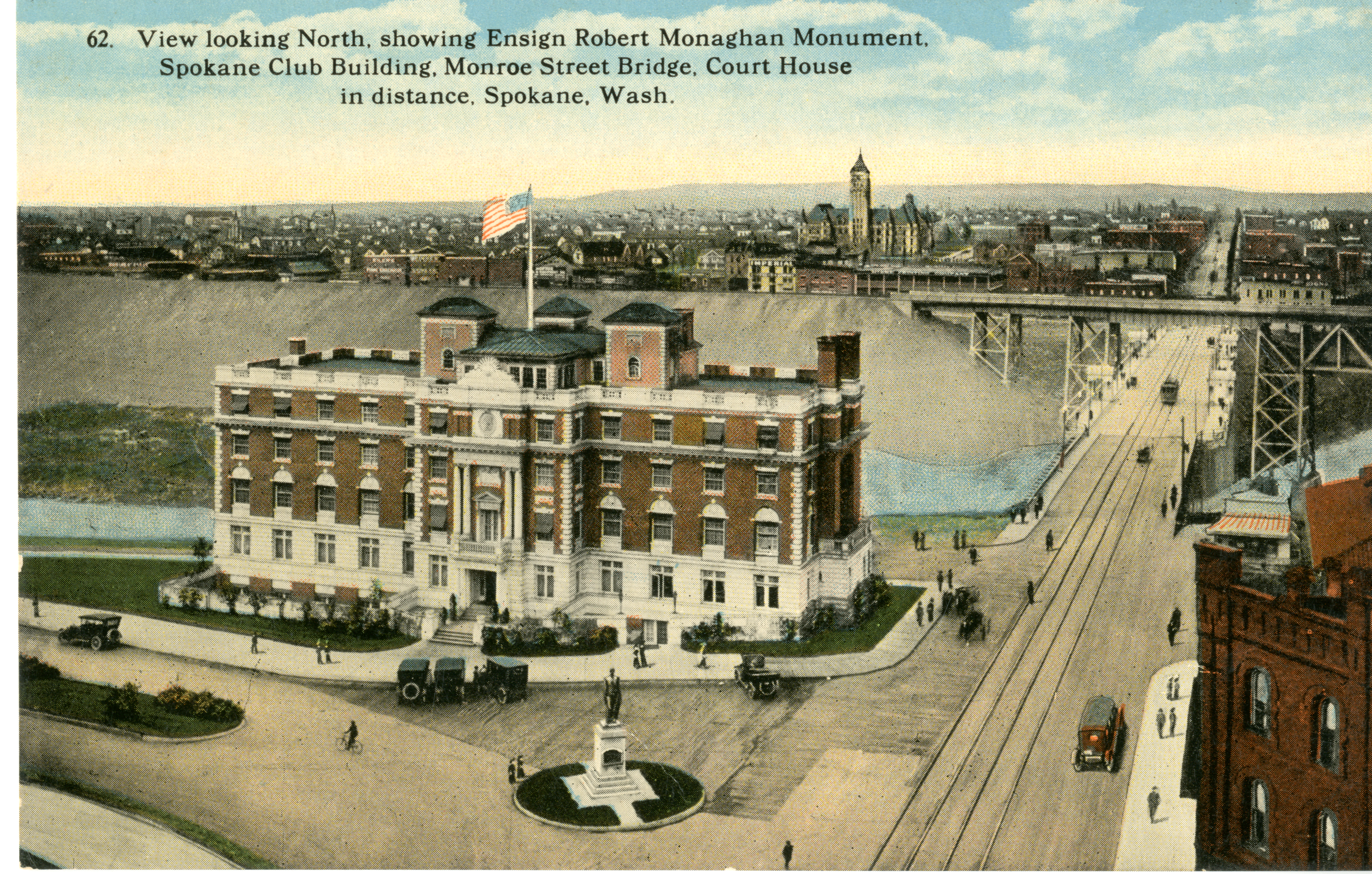
Monaghan Statue and Spokane Club looking north, 1910s

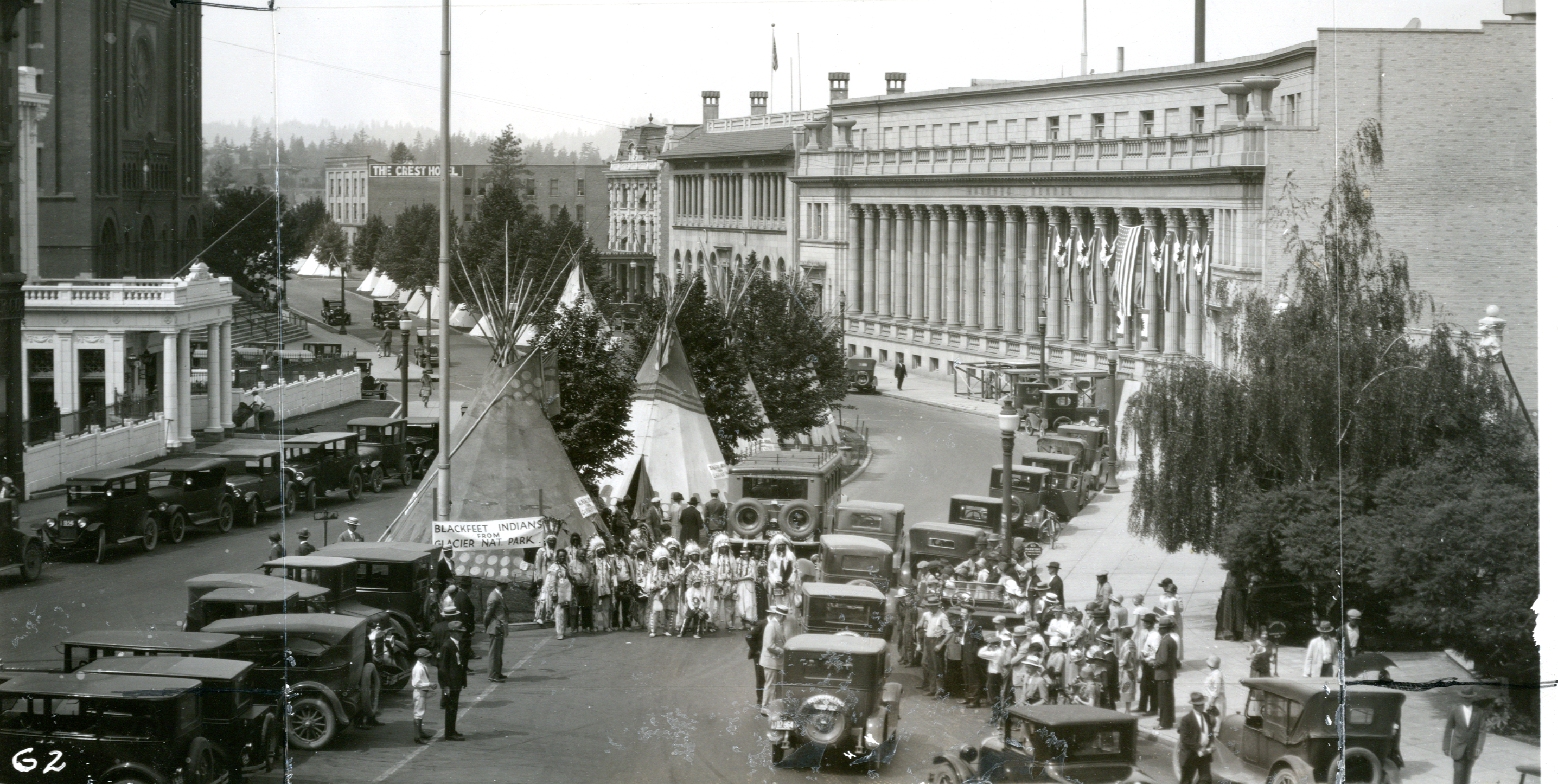
Indian Congress on Riverside, 1925

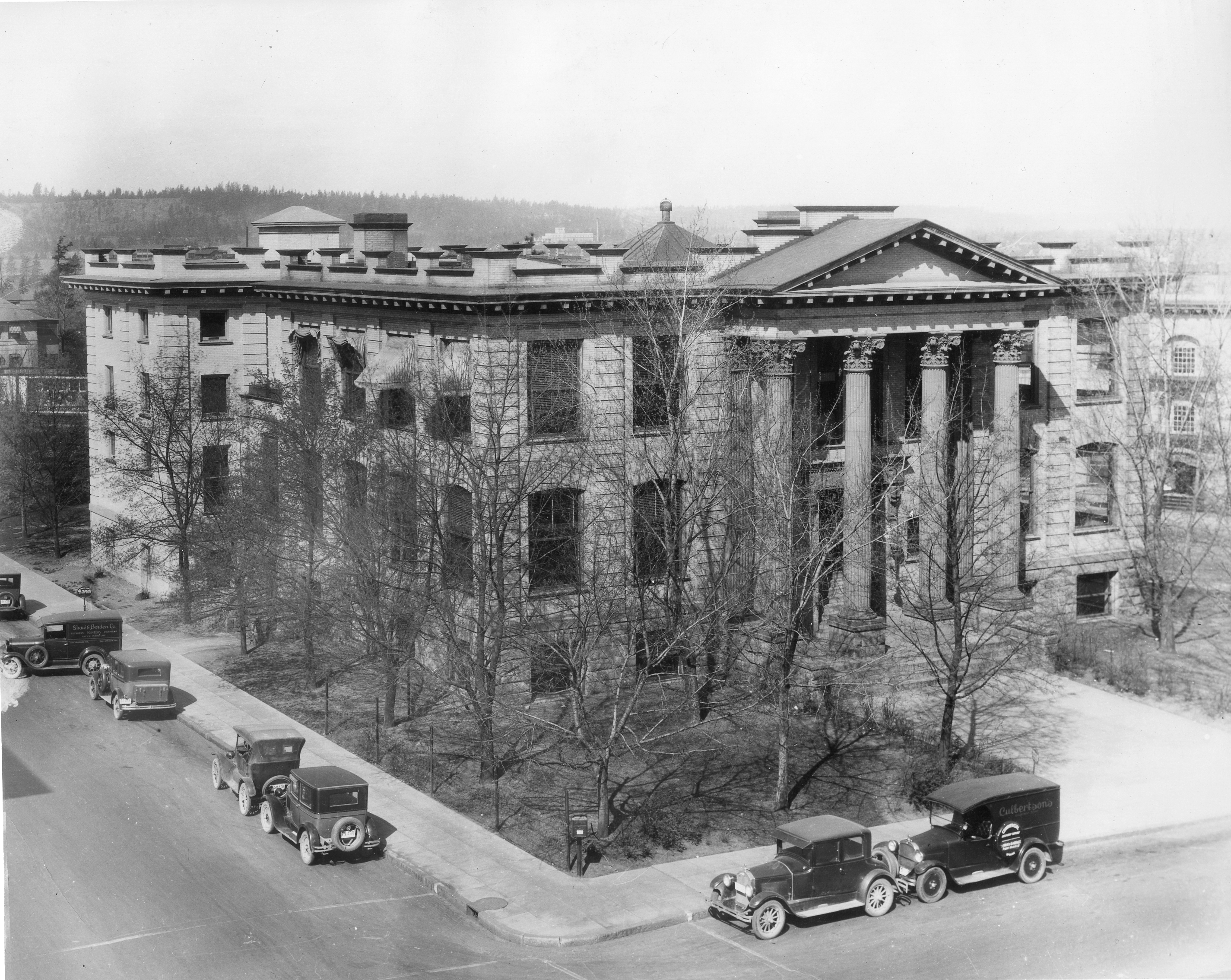
Carnegie Library looking northwest, 1920s

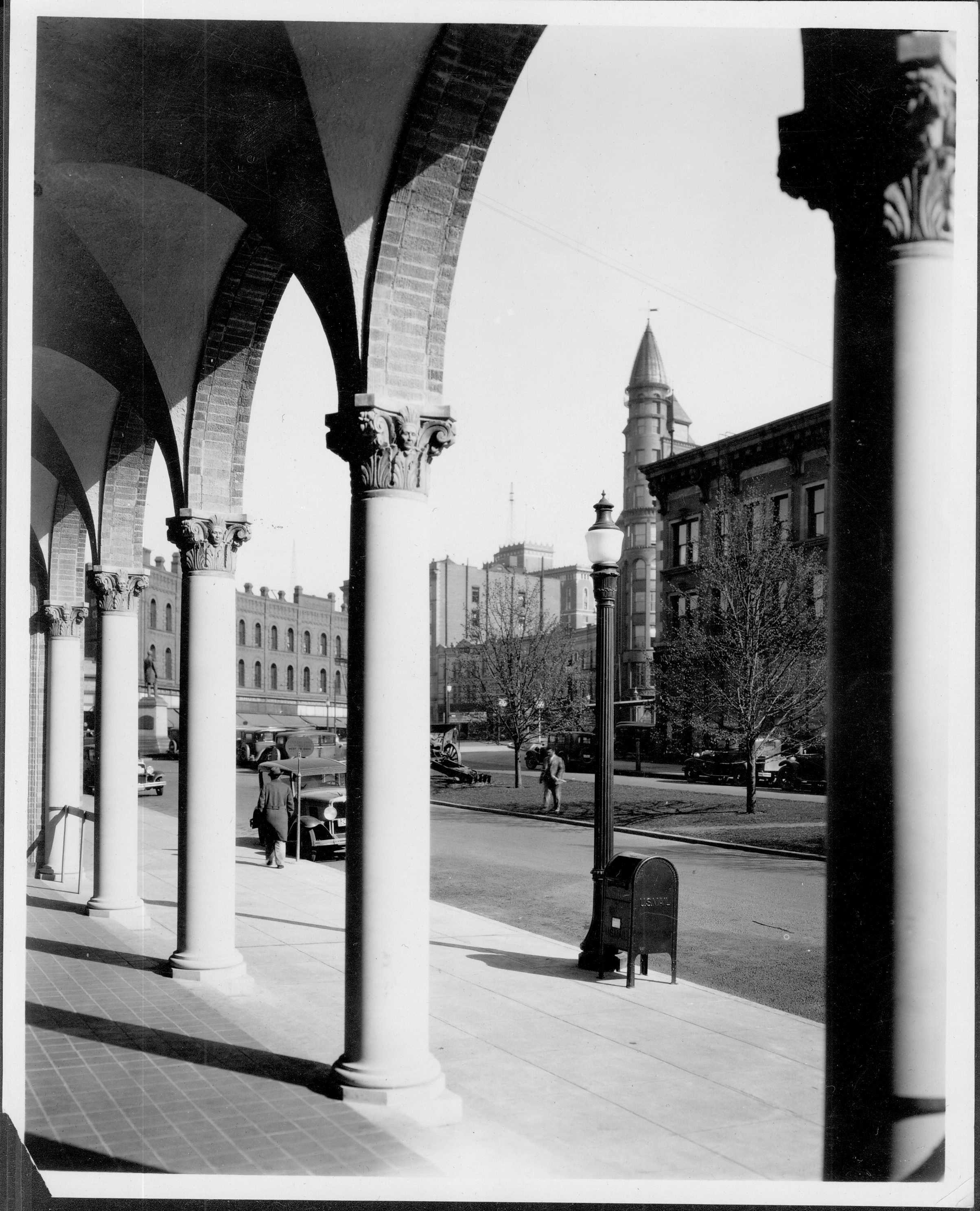
Looking east from the Civic Building, 1932

== See also ==
- Riverside, Spokane
- National Register of Historic Places listings in Spokane County, Washington
