= Schade Brewery =

- U.S. National Register of Historic Places
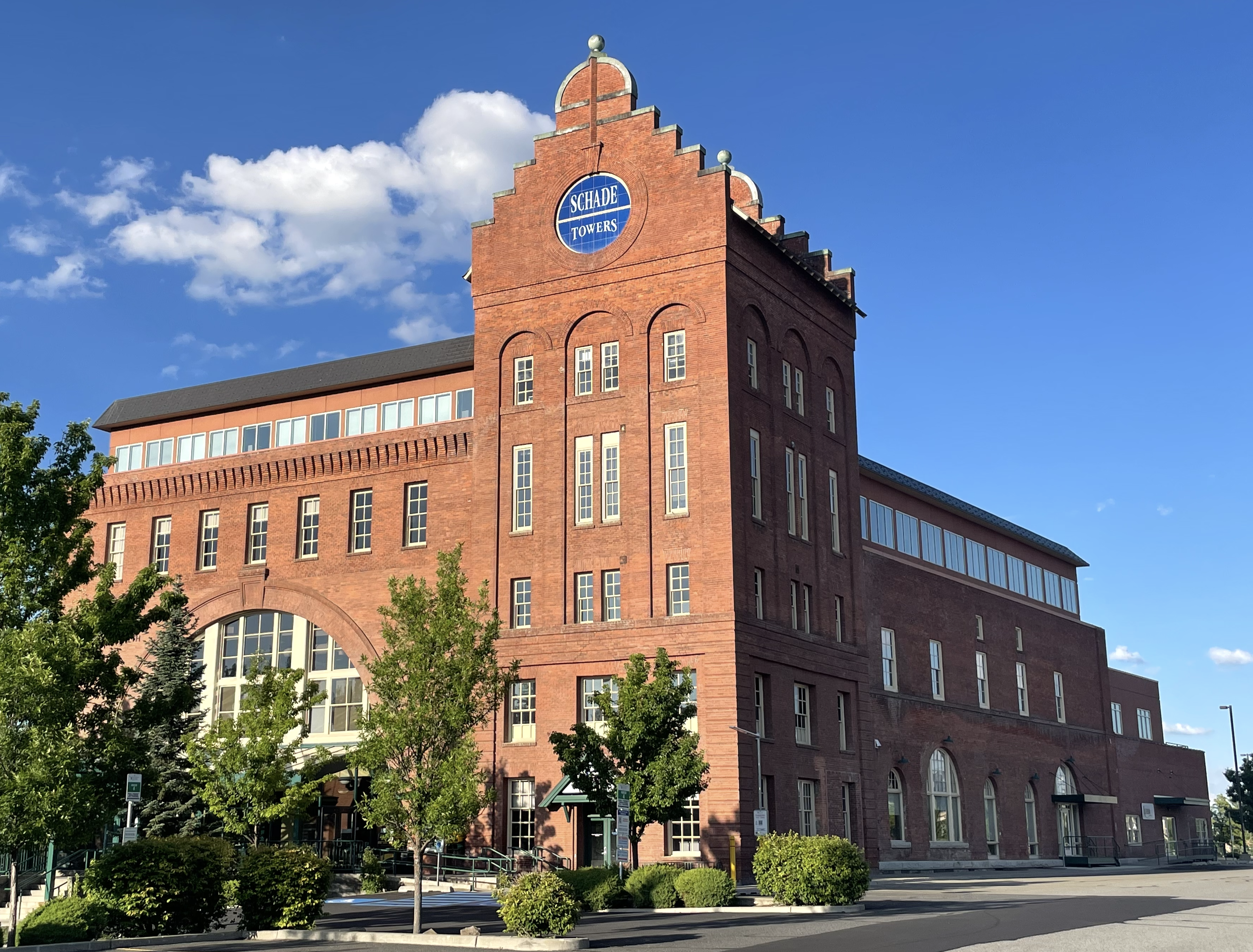

- Location within Spokane riverfront area
- Location: 528 E. Spokane Falls Blvd, Spokane, Washington
- Coordinates: 47°39′38″N 117°24′07″W
- Area: less than one acre
- Built: 1902
- Architect: Lewis Stritesky
- Architectural style: Late 19th and 20th century Revivals
- NRHP reference No.: 94001441
- Added to NRHP: December 8, 1994

Schade Brewery, commonly known as Schade Towers, is a historic building in the University District section of the East Central neighborhood of Spokane, Washington. It was built in 1902, with additional construction taking place in 1903, 1907 and between 1934 and 1937. It was added to the National Register of Historic Places (NRHP) in 1994. Built to house a brewery, the building has seen numerous uses over its century-plus in existence ranging from serving as housing for vagrants while abandoned, to its present use as commercial and office space.

Schade Brewery is a 5-story building located at the intersection of Spokane Falls Boulevard and Front Street, and adjacent to the Spokane River, just east of Downtown Spokane. Schade Tower is considered significant for its architecture and contributions to commerce and industry. While it no longer retains its original industrial use, it is a significant visual reminder of the area's former industrial setting though it is now surrounded by new developments spurred by the higher education setting of the modern University District in which it is located.

== History ==
Bernhardt Schade, an immigrant from Germany, arrived in Spokane in the early 1890s. He spent a decade working as a brew master at Spokane's New York Brewery, owned by Rudolph Gorkow. Gorkow died in 1896, and after an extended legal battle over Gorkow's will, Schade received a bequest from Gorkow which he used to branch out on his own and establish the Schade Brewery in 1903. Schade purchased the property in 1903, which included a newly construction cold storage facility standing two-and-a-half stories tall. The cold storage facility became the central section of the Schade Brewery building, which was expanded upon in 1903 based on a plan by architect Lewis Stritesky. This round of construction included the western facade, with the multi-story arched entry and five story tower. Advertisements for B. Schade Beer began appearing around Spokane that same year.

The Brewery was originally capable of producing 35,000 to 40,000 barrels of beer annually. That capacity was expanded in 1907 to 100,000 barrels per year, and a bottling facility was built on the property that same year. Less than a decade later, on June 16, 1916, Spokane enacted prohibition which forced Schade Brewery to soda and near beer, though neither was nearly as popular as Schade's previous products. Production was ultimately stalled in 1918 due to low demand and Schade's poor health, and three years later Schade took his own life.

Throughout the Prohibition Era and into the Great Depression the building sat empty, and was at times used as a homeless shelter and soup kitchen. Its location alongside transcontinental rail lines made Schade Brewery a logical location to house vagrants. Upon the repeal of prohibition in 1933, Schade Brewery was purchased by M. Rosauer, whose Golden Age Brewery returned the building to its original purchase. Having fallen into disrepair, the period from 1933 through 1937 saw the final phase of major construction on the structure and the brewery's capacity was increased to 200,000 barrels per year. Architect G.A. Pehrson was commissioned to draw up plans for the renovation and construction of this period, which included work on concrete, repairs to the wood floors, and construction of a 57 by 104 foot addition on the east of the building.

Golden Age Brewery operated at the site until 1948, when it was sold to locally owned Bohemian Brewing, who would later sell it to Chicago-based Atlantic Brewing. In 1959, the building's days as a brewery came to an end when it was sold to Inland Metal, which used the property as a warehouse until 1977. During that time, Schade Brewery was used to store salvaged building materials and the surrounding property became a junk yard. The building deteriorated once again. Louis Roy purchased the building in 1977 and made attempts to improve it, but ultimately gave up and retained its use as storage.

While it has never returned to its roots as a brewery, the Schade Brewery's fortunes took a turn for the better in 1991 when the building was purchased by Louis and Gailya Bonzon. The Bozons made improvements to the lower levels, renovating most of the first floor and leasing space to a carpet business and antique store. By the mid-to-late 1990s, ownership had changed hands once again, this time to Portland businessman Mark Leonard. Leonard put $4.5 million worth of rehabilitation work into the building in 1998, and leased space to other commercial businesses such as restaurants and offices.

Renovation work has continued into the 21st century, as Schade Brewery became known as Schade Towers. No longer industrial, as of 2011, Schade Towers was home to roughly 70,000 square feet of floor space and 60,000 square feet of retail and office space.

In 2021, No-Li Brewhouse honored the history of Schade Brewery with a commemorative pint glass featuring an illustration of the west facade with the large arched window and tower. In a Facebook post about the commemorative glass, No-Li wrote that "Schade Brewing helped establish the Spokane craft beer scene."

== Architecture ==
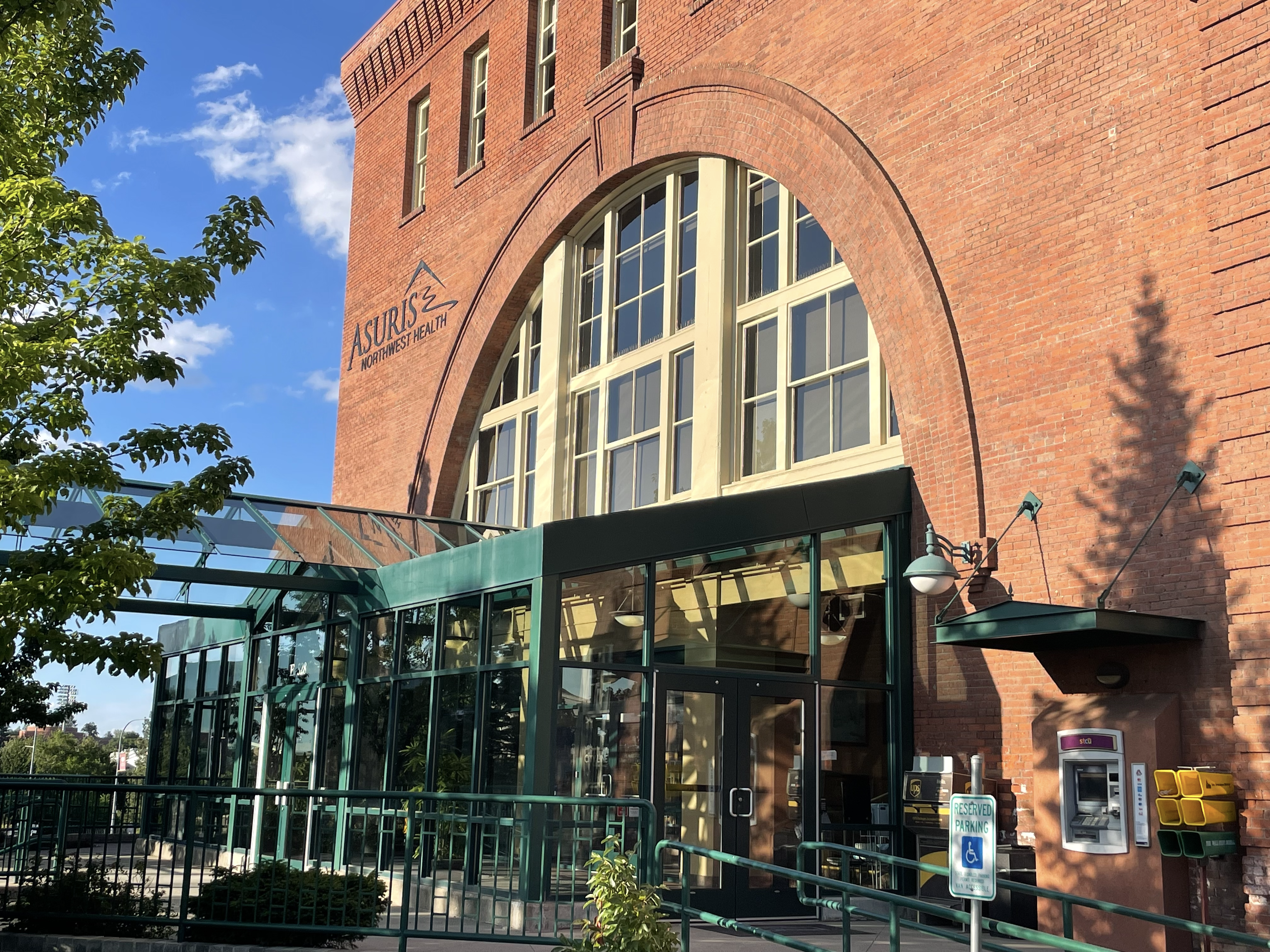
42 foot wide west facade arched window and main entrance

Schade Brewery is a roughly rectangular-shaped structure with dimensions of 101 by 201 feet. The southern facade is not parallel to the northern facade, but flares out slightly as it moves from the west to eastern facades. Most of the facade is built of red brick on a granite foundation, with the exception of a few areas constructed of poured concrete.

The building was constructed in four main phases, with the first taking place in 1902. That section was composed of a 2 1/2-story structure built for cold storage with a gambrel roof. It comprises the central mass of the building, and can be viewed from the exterior along the northern facade. The 1903 additions include the five story western section and tower, which was important for the gravity-fed operations of the brewery. The facades of this addition include large, arched windows. The largest of which is located on the western front, which is now located at the main entrance to the building, and spans 42 feet wide. Corbelled brick molding outlines the large arched windows, with a brick keystone capping the vertex of the largest of the arched windows.

The tower stands five stories tall with a gabled roof atop, located behind stepped parapet walls on the east and west facades, which feature circular windows near their peak. In 1907, a two-story addition was constructed directly east of the tower and south of the original 1902 structure. The 1907 addition measures 32 feet by 97 feet, with its exterior (southern) wall being the only non-parallel exterior wall in the structure. The windows and doorways on the 1907 addition are all arched on the first floor, with rectangular windows on the second story.

Between 1934 and 1937, an addition was added to the east of the building that is markedly different in style from the rest of the structure. Measuring 57 by 104 feet, the exterior walls were made of poured concrete instead of the red brick used in the rest of the building. Moving from the front of the building in the west to the rear of the building in the east, the land slopes down towards the Spokane River, the banks of which are located just over 100 feet from the northeast corner of the building. This slope allowed for the east addition to include a two-story basement.

Original wood flooring was removed over the years, but the concrete floors on most stories have remained. The concrete floors, with drainage plans necessary for a brewery of its time, have helped maintain structural integrity of the building and prevent calamitous water damage from occurring.

Brick walls were built three feet thick on the lower stories and two feet thick in the upper stories, to project a sense of power and importance. The stepped parapet roof of the tower and the brewery's gambrel roof are reminiscent of Flemish architecture, putting the Schade Brewery into the Dutch Revival style.
