= Gustav Albin Pehrson =

American architect (1880–1968)

Gustav Albin Pehrson (1880–1968), known professionally as G. A. Pehrson, was an architect of the U.S. state of Washington. His work includes the Chronicle Building for the Spokane Chronicle, Rookery Building in Spokane, Washington (demolished in 2006), and other buildings in Spokane, several mansions, and the new design for a community serving the Hanford nuclear plant, now part of Gold Coast Historic District (Richland, Washington). He also designed the Paulsen Medical and Dental Building (part of August Paulsen's Paulsen Center) in Spokane.

== Early life ==
Pehrson was born in Sweden. He attended Uppsala University and Oxford University, where he studied architecture. He immigrated to the U.S. in 1905, ultimately settling in Spokane, Washington.

== Career ==
He worked as a draftsman for Kirtland Cutter's firm Cutter and Malgren beginning in 1913. He established his own architecture business in 1917.

Soon after a prolific building period in the 1920s that included his terracotta-adorned Art Deco design work for the Chronicle Building and Paulsen Medical Building in Spokane, the Great Depression hit and the staff at Pehrson's firm fell from 29 to two.

He later found work designing the new community of Richland Village (Richland, Washington), where an agricultural town had been located. He designed government housing, schools and other buildings developed to serve the Hanford nuclear site.

Washington State University has a collection of documents about his work.

== Works ==
Some of Pehrson's works are:

- Western Union Life Building (1924) which later became the Chancery building, an Italian Renaissance style building, and now known as 1023 West Riverside Avenue in Spokane after being sold by the Catholic Diocese after being hit with sex abuse settlement costs.
- Eldridge Buick dealership (1925) at Cedar Street and Sprague Avenue in Spokane was the largest dealership in the Pacific Northwest when it was built, NRHP-listed.
- Paulsen Medical and Dental Building (1929), one of the last major buildings constructed in downtown Spokane before the stock market crash of October 1929. It includes Art Deco design with Spanish and Moorish detailing.
- Roosevelt Apartments (1929), a 6 story building at 7th and Howard in Spokane
- Victor Dessert's home (1936) in California Monterrey architecture style at South 1520 Rockwood Boulevard in Spokane
- Kirk Thompson Home, Streamline Moderne Art Deco at 1430 E. Overbluff Rd in Spokane
- Schade Brewery expansion (1933)
- Centennial Flour Mill (1939) on East Trent in Spokane
- Parker Suites (1946) in Minot, North Dakota, a 9 story building
- Carl Preiss Tudor architecture style mansion in Spokane
- Sacred Heart auditorium and nursing school
- Two homes on Overbluff Road in Spokane
