= Jack and Dan's =

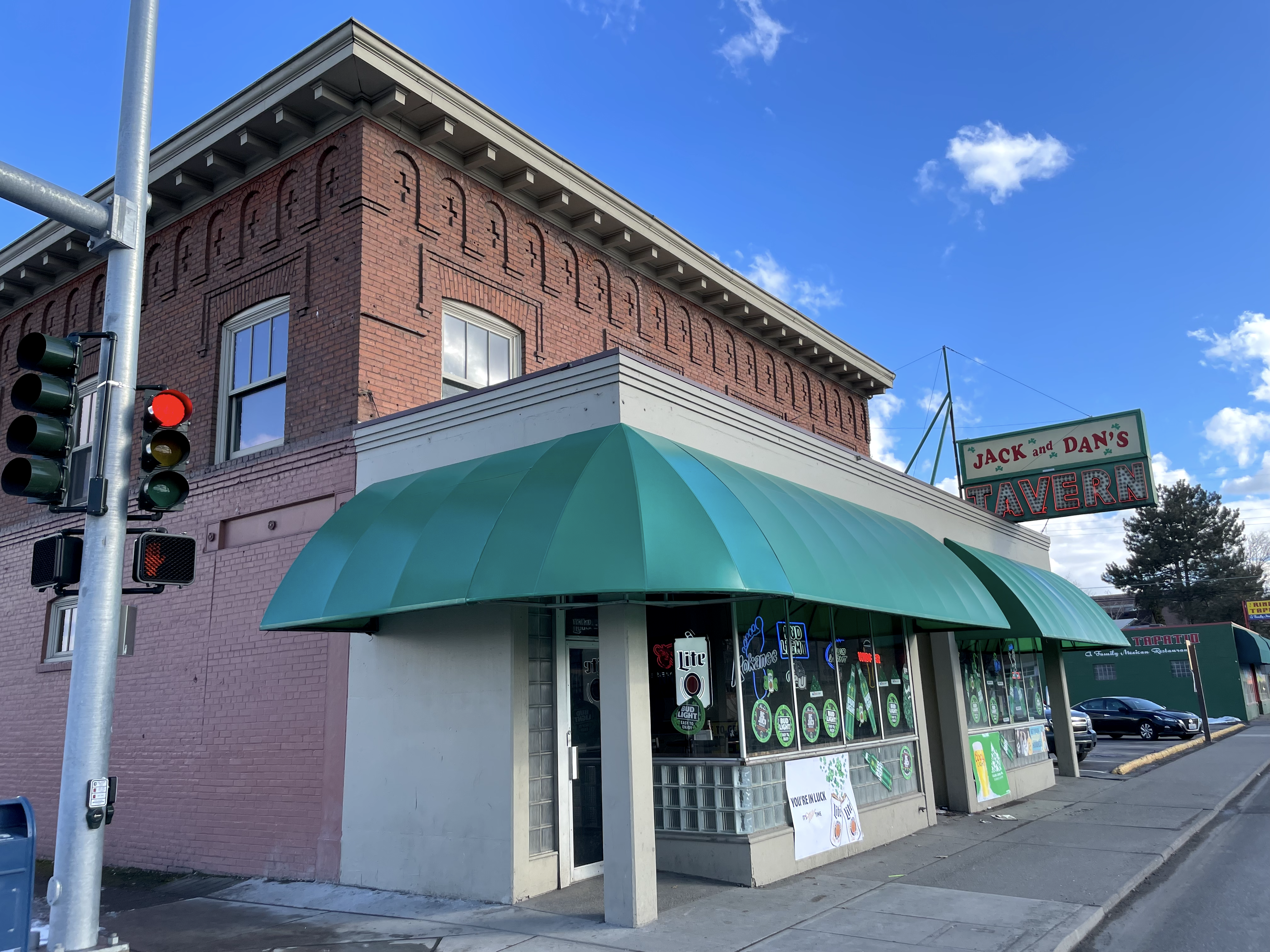
- Interactive map of Jack and Dan's

Restaurant information
- Established: 1932
- Location: 1226 N. Hamilton St., Spokane, Washington, 99202, United States
- Coordinates: 47.66936°N 117.395936°W
- Website: www.jackanddans.com

Jack and Dan's is a bar and grill in Spokane, Washington. It is located at 1226 N. Hamilton St. in the Logan Neighborhood a block from the Gonzaga University campus. Jack and Dan's is named in part for Jack Stockton, longtime Logan resident and father of Gonzaga Bulldogs basketball legend John Stockton. The proximity to the Gonzaga campus along with its ties to the Gonzaga basketball program have made Jack and Dan's a Gonzaga and Spokane landmark. It is commonly mentioned on Gonzaga basketball telecasts and in other media discussions of Gonzaga basketball.

The building housing the tavern was listed on the Spokane Register of Historic Places in 2006.

Jack and Dan's was named one of the 25 best sports bars in the United States by Sports Illustrated in 2005, coming in at number six.

== Description ==
Jack and Dan's is a sports bar that serves traditional American bar food like buffalo wings, hamburgers and sandwiches along with soups, salads, appetizers and a handful of entrees. The bar has 20 beers on tap. Throughout the bar and restaurant are 19 televisions. Despite the word "tavern" appearing on the sign out front, Jack and Dan's serves liquor as well.

During the day the restaurant is a quiet place for residents of the Logan neighborhood to grab lunch or a drink. On Friday and Saturday nights however, the clientele shifts to mostly younger college students from nearby Gonzaga University. Jack and Dan's is one of the most popular places to watch Gonzaga basketball on TV, which brings large crowds to the bar on Zag game days.

It is located at the intersection of Hamilton Street and Sharp Avenue. Hamilton is a major north–south arterial and Sharp is a minor east–west arterial. Jack and Dan's has a parking lot with access off both Hamilton and Sharp. The stretch of Hamilton where Jack and Dan's is located is zoned as a commercial core district and is home to many other restaurants and bars which cater to the neighborhood and population of college students from Gonzaga University.

== History ==
Built in 1909, the building that currently holds Jack and Dan's was originally home to the Pioneer Educational Society, a financial organization of Jesuits in the Pacific Northwest. Nearby Gonzaga University was founded by Catholic priests of the Society of Jesus, or Jesuits, and the school remains a Jesuit institution. The building was divided into commercial spaces on the ground floor with apartments above. Sontag Grocery operated out of the southern commercial space of the building until 1934.

The building's history as a drinking establishment began in 1933 with the end of Prohibition. A year later, Snappy Beer Parlor replaced Sontag Grocery on the south side of the building. There building has been home to a beer parlor, under various names, continuously ever since.

The building's connection to Gonzaga athletics predates the Jack and Dan's name. Joey's Tavern opened in the space in 1947, named for owner Joey August, who was also the coach of the Gonzaga boxing team which won the 1950 national championship. Gonzaga discontinued its boxing program two years later and August went into the beer business full time.

Former Gonzaga student Jack Stockton and his friend Dan Crowley purchased the bar in 1961, though it would be until 1975 before the pair renamed the bar Jack and Dan's. Crowley sold his share of the business in 1991 to former Gonzaga student Jeff Condill. Condill played alongside Jack's son John Stockton on the 1983-84 Gonzaga Bulldogs men's basketball team, and would remain in business with the elder Stockton until 2006.

Jack sold his share of the business to another former Gonzaga student, Kevin MacDonald, in 2006. MacDonald and Condill own the business, but as of 2013 the building is owned by John Stockton. Jack Stockton died in 2017 at the age of 89.

Jack and Dan's, and previous iterations of the tavern, shared the building with University Pharmacy from 1939 until 2004, when the pharmacy closed and the tavern expanded to take over the entire space.

While still referred to as a tavern, with the word illuminated on the main sign out front, Jack and Dan's legally transitioned from a tavern to a bar and grill in 2007. Businesses legally defined as taverns cannot sell hard alcohol in the state of Washington.

== The building ==
Built in 1909, the building which houses Jack and Dan's was listed on the Spokane Register of Historic Places in 2006.

It is a two-story, red brick building with a full basement and a symmetrical western facade that fronts directly onto the sidewalk along Hamilton Street, on the southeast corner of the intersection with Sharp Avenue. There are two main entrances to the first floor, both along Hamilton in the northwest and southwest corners of the building. These two entrances formerly led to separate storefronts until 2004 when Jack and Dan's expanded into the northern half formerly occupied by University Pharmacy. The main entrances lead into a 1952 addition which protrudes from the front of the original brick structure and brings the western facade flush with the sidewalk. The addition is made of concrete with large glass windows running along the western side, a style typical of mid-century storefront architecture. In the center of the addition is a door which leads to the second floor apartments.

The window, molding and second story arcade are similar in style to those of St. Aloysius Church on the Gonzaga Campus, which like Jack and Dan's was designed by architects Herman Preusse and Julius Zittel, also in 1909.

Another addition to the original building, though less of a juxtaposition stylistically than the 1952 addition on the west side, came in 1922 on the east side of the building when a one-story brick addition was built.

== In popular culture ==
In 2004, ESPN produced a three-episode documentary series on Gonzaga basketball: The Season - Gonzaga Basketball. The first scene of the first episode features Gonzaga head coach Mark Few and then-assistant coach Leon Rice meeting with former Michigan State Spartans head coach Jud Heathcote, who had retired to Spokane, for lunch at Jack and Dan's. Few refers to Jack and Dan's as "Gonzaga's legendary spot" and says, "It's like Cheers."
