= Spokane Public Library - Heath Branch =

- Spokane Public Library
- U.S. National Register of Historic Places
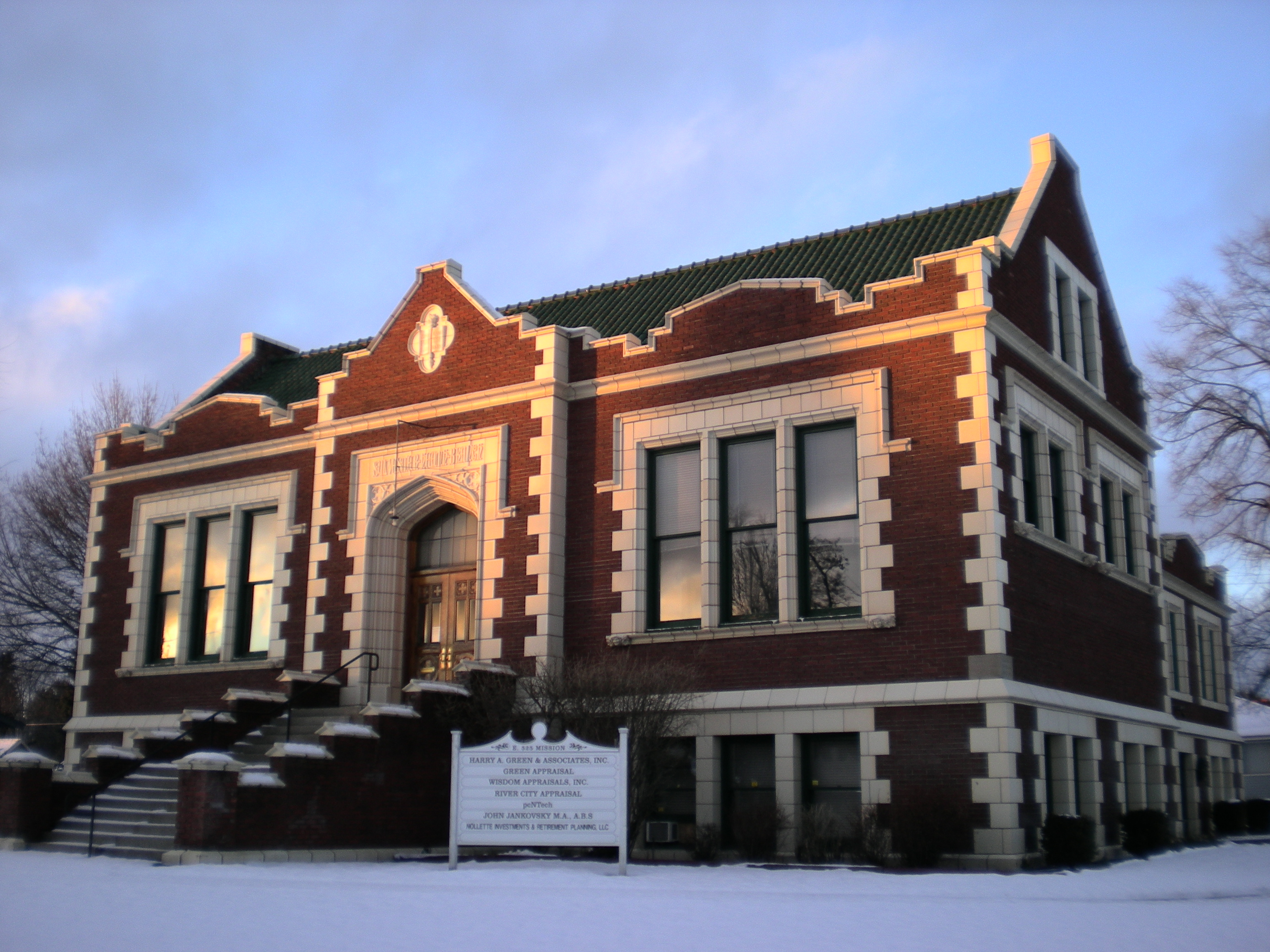
- The library in 2008

- Location within Spokane riverfront area
- Location: 525 Mission Street, Spokane, Washington
- Coordinates: 47°40′20″N 117°24′02″W
- Area: less than one acre
- Built: 1914
- Architect: Julius Zittel
- MPS: Carnegie Libraries of Washington TR
- NRHP reference No.: 82004291
- Added to NRHP: August 3, 1982

The Spokane Public Library - Heath Branch is a historic building in the Logan neighborhood of Spokane, Washington. It was designed by architect Julius Zittel, and built in 1914 with $35,000 from Andrew Carnegie. It has been listed on the National Register of Historic Places since August 3, 1982. It was subsequently included in the Mission Avenue Historic District, which was listed on the NRHP in 1986.
