= Desmet Avenue Warehouse Historic District =

- U.S. National Register of Historic Places
- U.S. Historic district
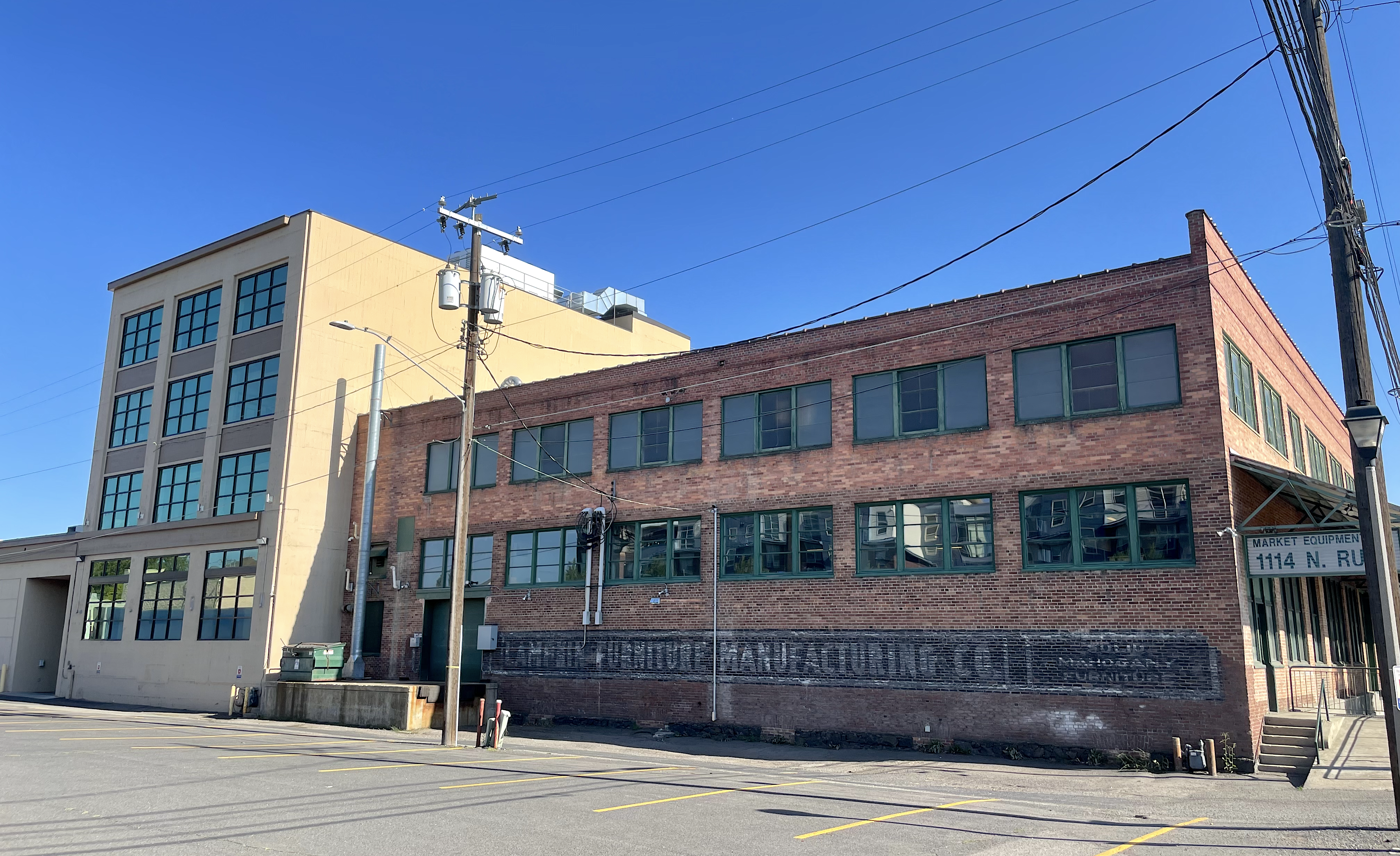
- Rear view of two warehouses on Desmet Ave.

- Location within Spokane riverfront area Location within Washington (state) Location within the United States
- Location: Desmet Ave., Spokane, Washington
- Coordinates: 47°40′04″N 117°24′34″W
- Area: 2 acres (0.81 ha)
- Built: 1904-1946
- Architect: Multiple
- Architectural style: Commercial Style
- NRHP reference No.: 97000450
- Added to NRHP: May 27, 1977

The Desmet Avenue Warehouse Historic District is a 2 acres (0.81 ha) historic district in the Logan neighborhood just outside the city center of Spokane, Washington which was listed on the National Register of Historic Places in 1997. The listing includes six contributing properties, two of which have subsequently been demolished. The district was notable for its tight collection of early-20th-century structures over just two city blocks that all served like purposes. Of the four remaining structures, only one is still used for a purpose similar to what it was built to serve. The two easternmost structures are now part of the Gonzaga University campus, which surrounds the eastern half of the district to the north, east and south.

== Setting ==
The Desmet Avenue Warehouse Historic District is located approximately three blocks north of the Spokane River, which separates it from the city's downtown core. Gonzaga University is located immediately east of the district, and has expanded into the two easternmost properties of the district. Division St. marks the western boundary of the district, and Ruby St. runs parallel one block to the east. Division and Ruby form a couplet in this area, carrying U.S. Route 2 and U.S. Route 395. The two form the main north–south thoroughfare on the north side of Spokane and are classified as a principal arterial by the city.

At the time of development, the Desmet Avenue Warehouses were part of the broader Sinto Warehouse District. Prior to development, the city's warehouses were concentrated south of the river along the main railroad tracks. Railroad spurs were extended into the area after the Great Spokane Fire of 1889, at which point little development existed north of the Division Street Bridge. Depots for the Spokane and International, the Oregon Railway and Navigation, and the Spokane Falls and Northern railways were built in what would become the Sinto Warehouse District. Developer Walter L. Bean spearheaded construction in the district, with The Spokesman-Review newspaper saying in a 1914 article, "Mr. Bean is the pioneer in the North Side warehouse section. He put in the switch and has sold all the sites of the present warehouses." The broader district went into a decline in the 1960s when the rail lines and spurs were torn out north of the river. Commercial development pushed north into the Sinto Warehouse District in the decades that followed, resulting in the demolition of many former warehouses. When the Desmet Avenue Warehouse Historic District was listed on the NRHP in 1998, it was the most intact remaining section of the broader warehouse district. The threat to the area from commercial encroachment was even mentioned in its registration form. That threat was realized in 2008 when two of the district's six contributing properties were demolished to make way for new development.

== Existing contributing properties ==
=== Burgan's Furniture Warehouse No. 1 ===
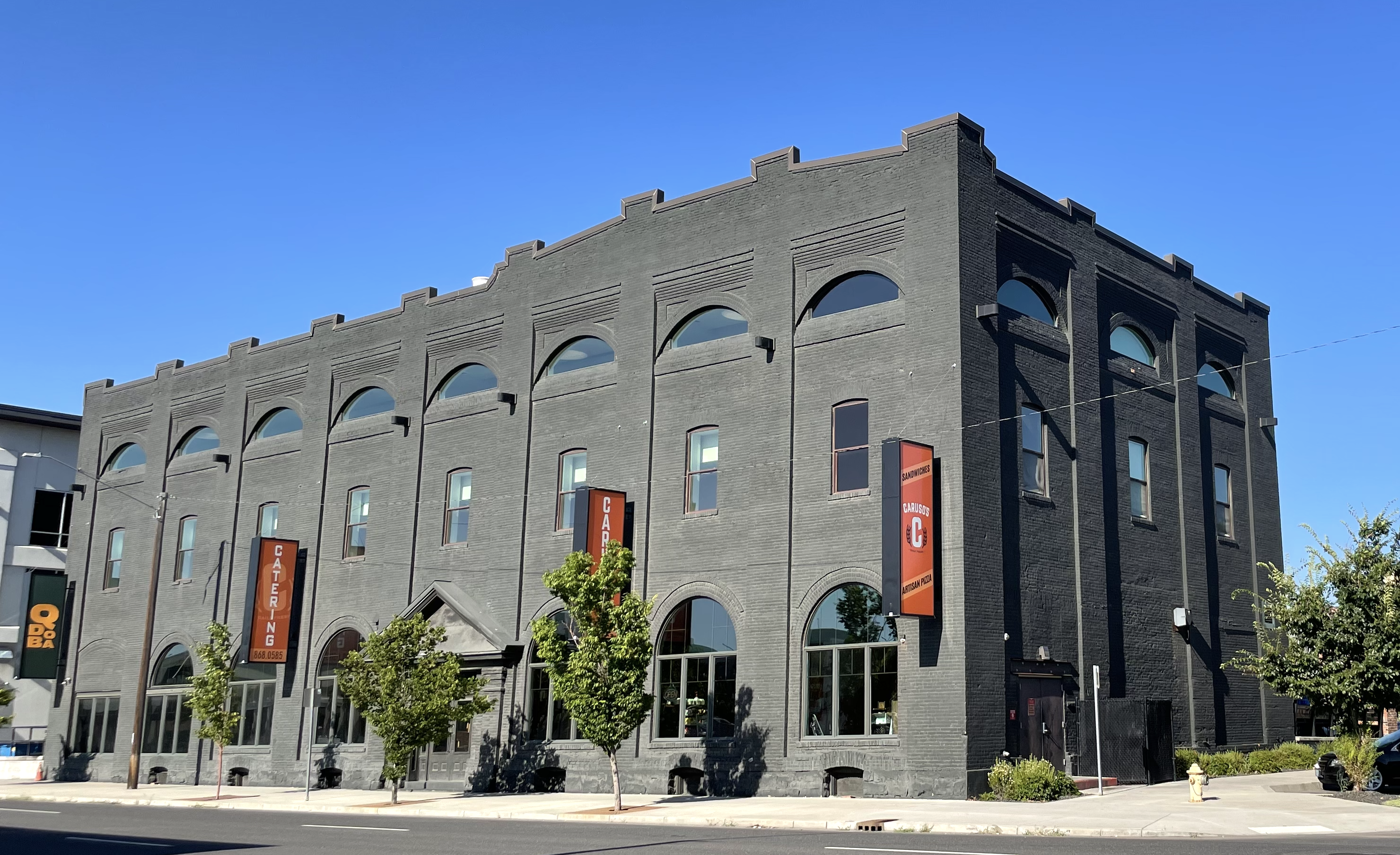
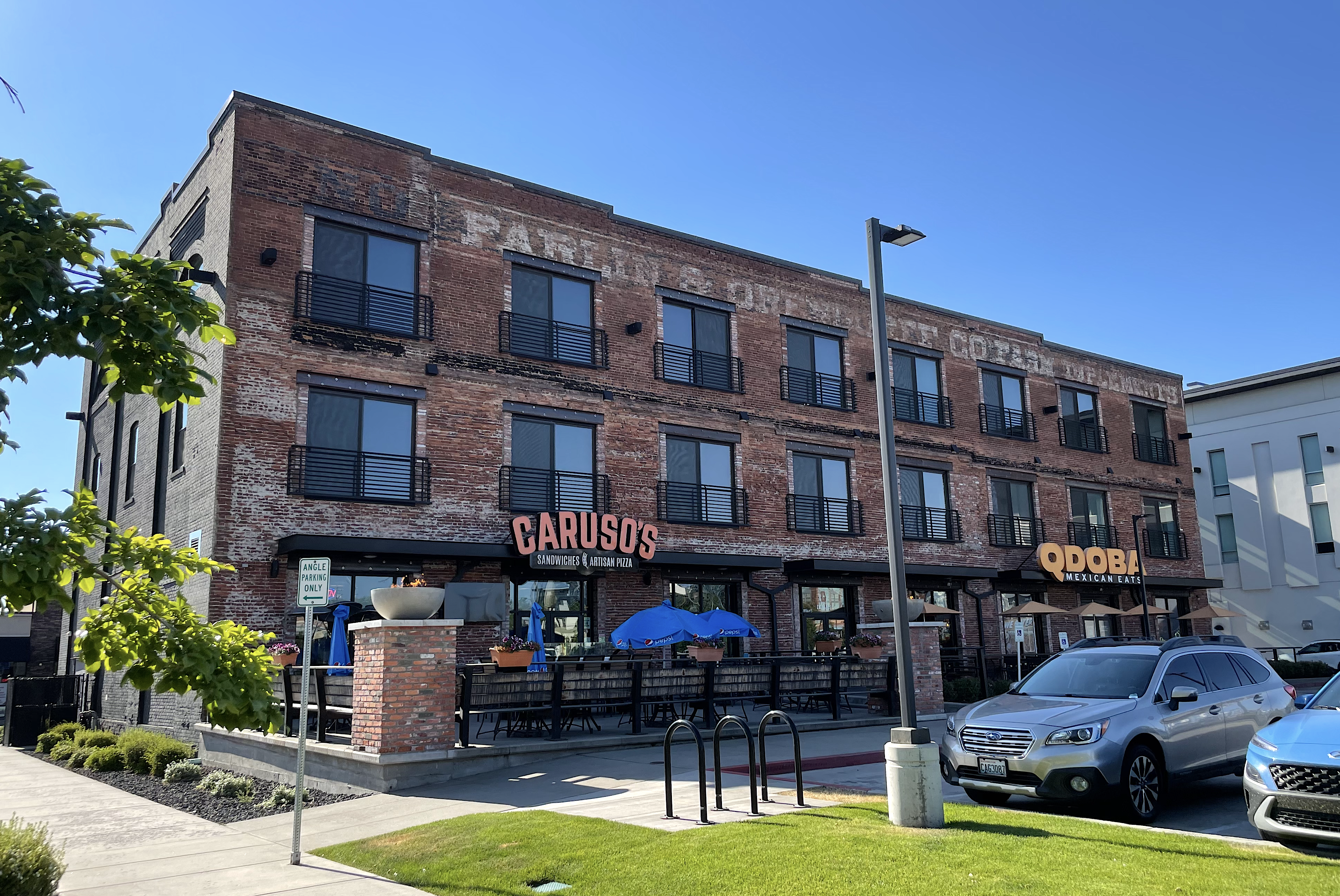
Division and Desmet sides (left) and the East view (right) of the Burgan's Furniture Warehouse No. 1

Located at 1 East Desmet Ave., at the intersection with Division St., was constructed in late 1905 in the Commercial style, designed by Spokane architect Robert L. Hals. It was built for Anton E. Bergum, manager of the Spokane Wood & Coal Company, at a cost of $16,000. Before construction was completed, the building was leased to the Parlin & Orendorff Company of Canton, Illinois, which manufactured farm equipment and wagons. The building was used as one of their many warehouses along rail lines stretching west of the Mississippi River. A year after it was built, a fire sparked across Division at the Lamb Lumber Company caused damage to the western side of the building. Awnings were burned and windows were shattered on the exterior and paint on wagons near the west side of the building blistered. Parlin & Orendorff moved out of the building until 1910, and in 1911 it was sold to the Northwestern General Trading Partners. In a promotional release about the property, Northwestern General Trading Partners mentioned the building's accessibility along multiple streetcar lines, a railroad spur, and location in the heart of the city's wholesale district.

The "Burgan's" moniker began to apply to the building by 1921, when ES Burgan and Son Inc. began operating their department story in a multi-story building immediately to the north. Edwin Burgan would eventually purchase the warehouse and use it for freight storage. Edwin Burgan died in 1948 at the age of 99. The Burgan's and their company, Burgans Furniture, operated at the property until 2008 when the company went out of business and the properties were sold.

In 2015, both the warehouse building and the former department store directly to the north were converted into Ruby Suites, an extended-stay hotel catering to corporate clients. The upper floors of the warehouse were converted into rooms for the hotel and the ground floor was converted into a pair of restaurants.

It is a three-story, rectangular brick building built in the Commercial style with influences from late-19th-century industrial structures. The building is built on a basalt foundation with a daylight basement. Initially, the long façade along Division St. and the shorter façade facing Desmet Ave. were the two public-facing sides while the north face fronted an alley and the east face was against another warehouse. Since the renovation in 2015, however, the east facade has been significantly changed from its original plain appearance. It is now covered in 16 identical windows across the top two floors, and the main entrance to the restaurants on the ground level is located on the east face. The original main public-facing side of the building ran along Division St. The ground floor has seven arched windows running along the sidewalk, with an entryway in the portal where the fifth window from the north would be located. The entryway's double doors are capped with transoms and features a classically-inspired pediment made of zinc. The second-story's windows are smaller and rectangular, located centrally above the arches of the windows below. The third floor features eight broad but short, relative to the first-story windows, arched windows. Plain brick piers separate each of the windows on all floors. This pattern is replicated on the second and third stories of the south elevation along Desmet.

=== Market Equipment Company Office and Warehouse ===
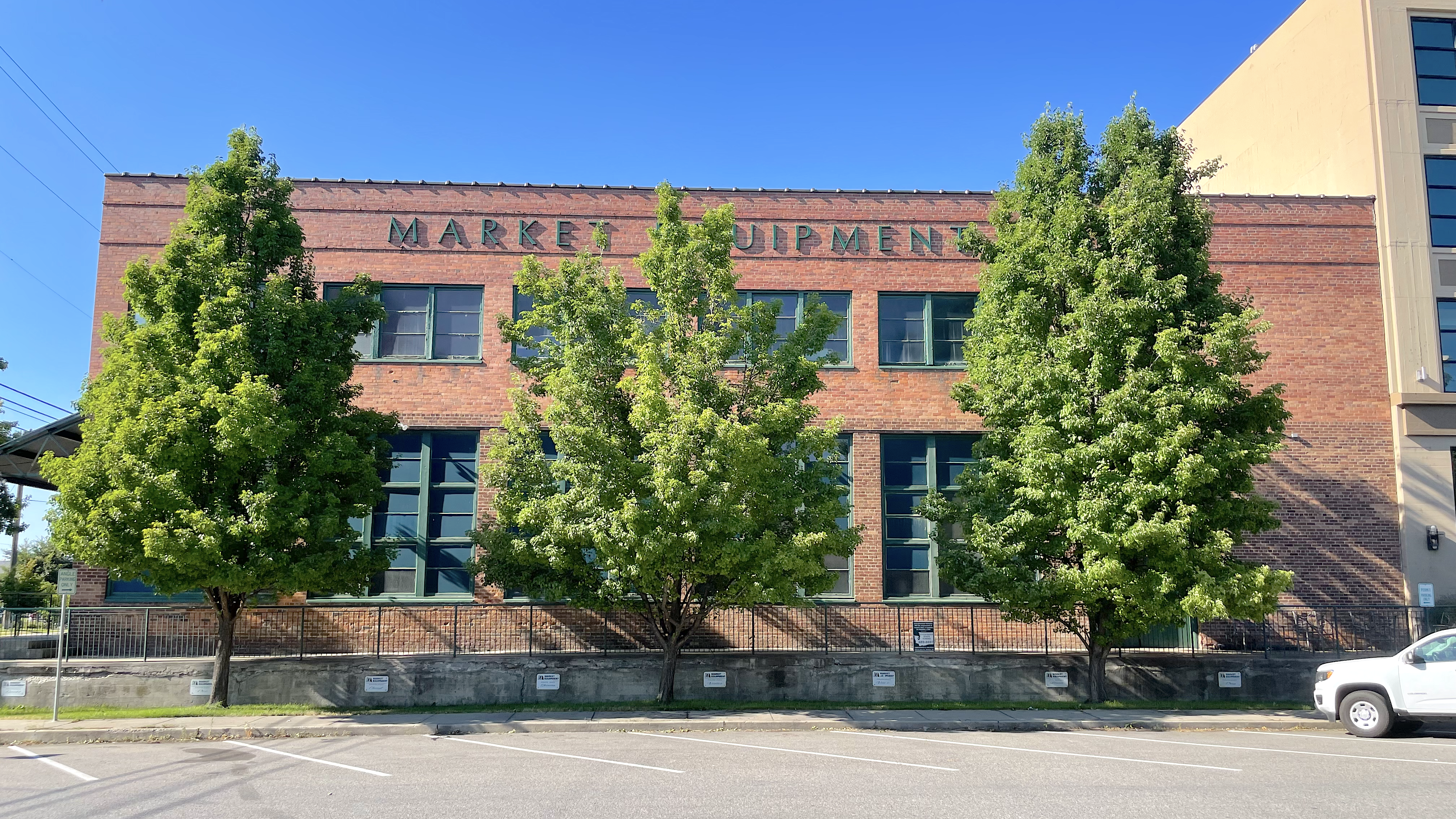
Market Equipment Company south face

Located at 105 E. Desmet, at the intersection of Desmet Ave. and Ruby St., the Market Equipment Company was constructed in 1946, making it the youngest of the structures in the historic district. It was designed by local architectural firm Whitehouse & Price and built by contractor W.G. Meyers. It was built for the W.P. Fuller and Company and was intended to serve as a paint, glass and door warehouse, as well as a manufacturing center on the main floor. The building was to act as an expansion of W.P. Fuller and Company's existing property, immediately to the east. It was constructed atop the foundation of the previous structure at the site, an agricultural tool dealership built in 1904 by the Shaw-Wells Company. As of 2022, the building is owned by Market Equipment Company, which use it as an office, warehouse and repair shop.

Rectangular in shape, it is a red brick building built upon a basalt foundation with two above-ground stories and a full basement. The façades along Desmet Ave. and Ruby St. feature industrial-style rectangular wood sash windows with fixed glass panes. The windows along the first floor are considerably larger than those above, and take up most of the wall space. The west façade along Ruby is similar, though there are five doors along the ground floor, three of which are oversized, and a large overhanging metal awning which stretches along the entire western side. Both the west and south sides feature loading docks. The south face features six rectangular windows on each floor, matching the second story windows from the western and southern sides. Along this façade, the first-story bricks are darker red while the second-story bricks are more of a reddish brown. There is no wall along the east side of the building, as it was built to be an extension of the existing warehouse immediately to the east. That warehouse's exterior western wall is visible as the eastern interior wall of the Market Equipment Company.

=== W.P. Fuller and Company Paint Warehouse ===
Before and after renovation

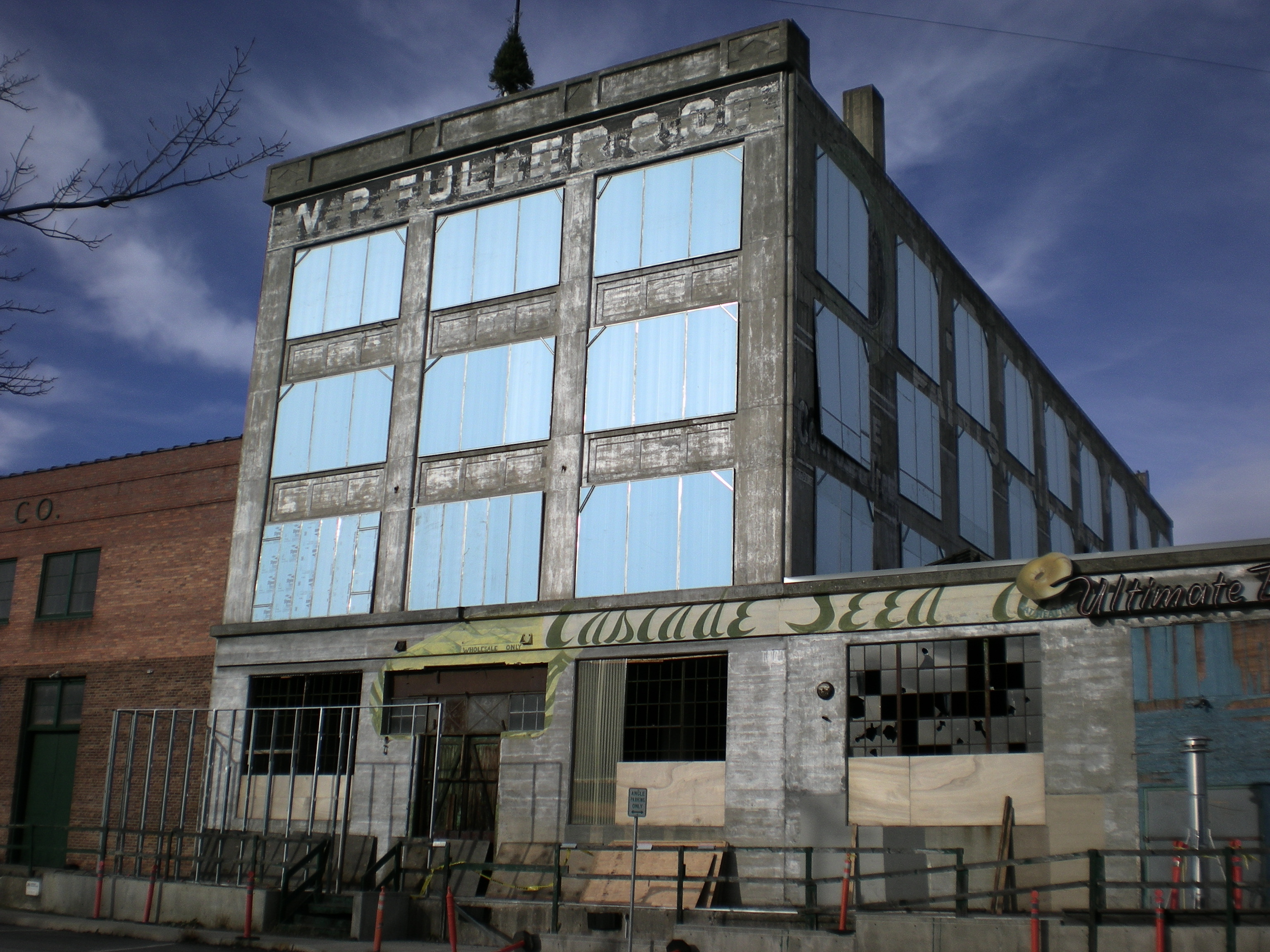
The W.P. Fuller and Company Warehouse in 2008 with the names of two former tenants visible

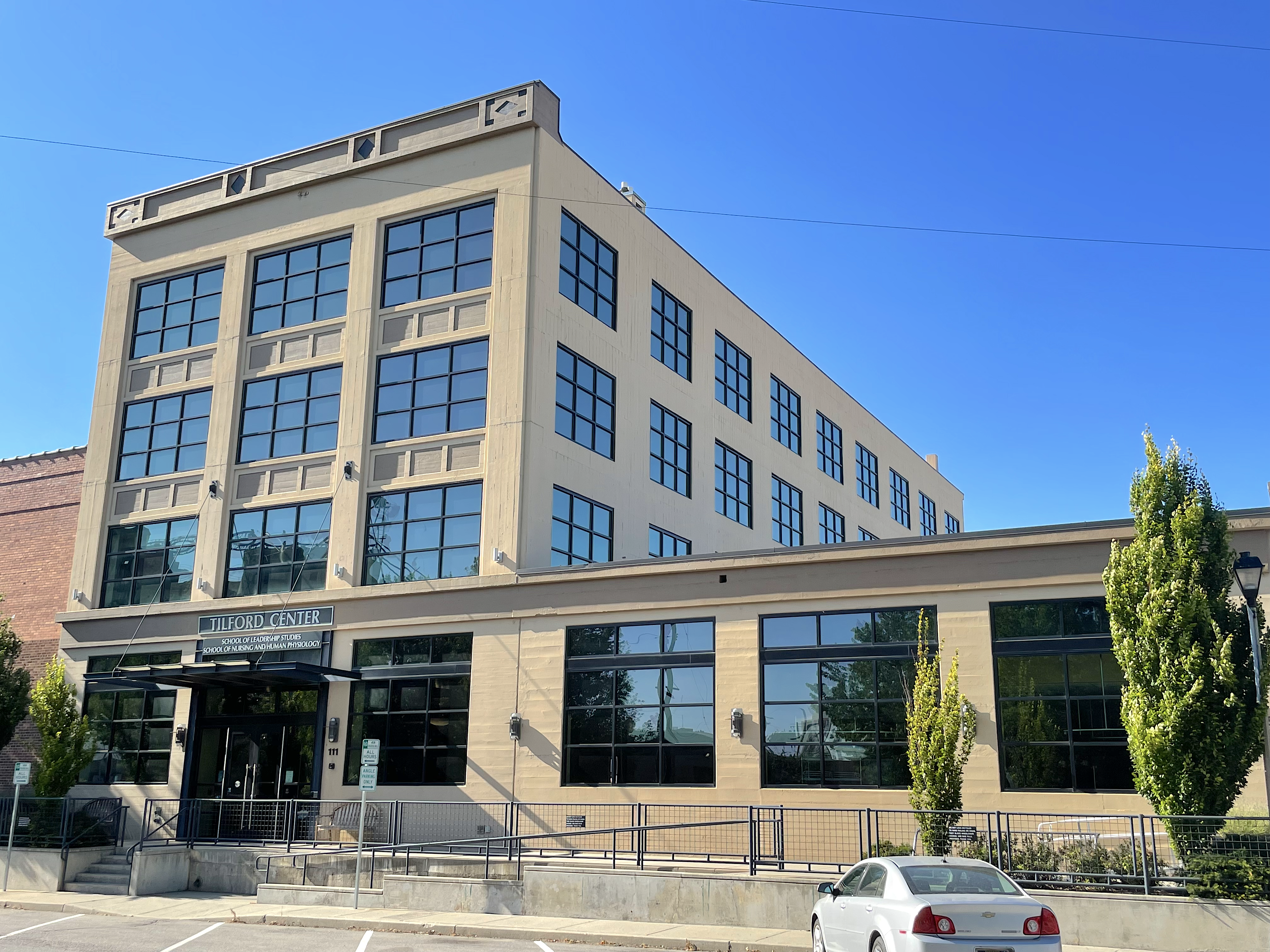
Gonzaga University's Tilford Center in 2022

Located at 111 E. Desmet Ave., built in two phases. The four-story structure was completed in 1905, with a one-story addition to the east constructed in 1939. The original concrete building was designed by architect S. H. Knight. for W.P. Fuller and Company, a paint, varnish and painting supplies retailer. The company also sold windows, doors, art glass and other products for work on building exteriors. The Colonial Building Company was given a $40,000 contract for the construction of the structure. Founded by William Farmer Fuller, a tradesman from New Hampshire who came west during the California Gold Rush, Fuller died in 1890, and four years later his family bought out his company. It soon expanded around the West Coast of the United States. They operated at the location into the 1960s, when the company merged with the O'Brien Company and the building was sold. The building retained its use as a warehouse for tenants like the Cascade Seed Company. Though, by the 1990s the building sat vacant.

In 1995 the building was listed on the NRHP on its own merit, prior to the listing of the Desmet Avenue Warehouse Historic District. At the time, an adaptive reuse project was planned for the structure. That adaptive reuse came just over a decade later when Gonzaga University rededicated the building as the Tilford Center, named for the Tilford family, a multi-generational group of Gonzaga alumni and donors. It houses a cafe, faculty offices, classrooms and both undergraduate and postgraduate programs for The School of Professional Studies, including Nursing, the Comprehensive Leadership Program, Master's in Organizational Leadership, Master's in Communication & Leadership, and the Ph.D. in Leadership Studies.

The original part of the building is a reinforced concrete structure on a rectangular base, measuring 50 feet along Desmet and 142 feet deep into the block, that rises four stories above a full basement. Interior structures such as columns, floors and stairways were made of reinforced concrete, as was the exterior. At the time, the new technology behind reinforced concrete was something to celebrate, so the exterior was not covered with a façade and the concrete was left exposed. An article published during the building's construction in The Spokesman-Review, Spokane's daily newspaper, echoed that sentiment, stating, "The concrete piers, the main structural members of the facade, will be rubbed smooth, but will be left in the natural concrete color and indicate frankly the strength and durability of the construction within." The building's main entrance faced Desmet Ave. on the south face of the building, with a centrally located pair of wooden doors that have subsequently been replaced. On either side of the entryway are a pair of matching, large, rectangular metal sash windows. The three stories above feature matching windows, three per floor, separated by concrete piers. Between the first and second story is a simple concrete cornice. A concrete parapet runs along the roofline on the southern face. The east and west faces were initially plain and windowless, but the east face had windows matching those on the front and back sides of the building added during the adaptive reuse redevelopment.

The 1939 addition stretched east from the original building and rose to just one story in elevation. From the outside the two structures are visually similar and appear to constitute a single building. The interior, however, was not built to be fireproof like the original structure was, as it has wood floors, support beams and a roof.

=== Peerless-Sunpuft Inc. Office and Warehouse ===
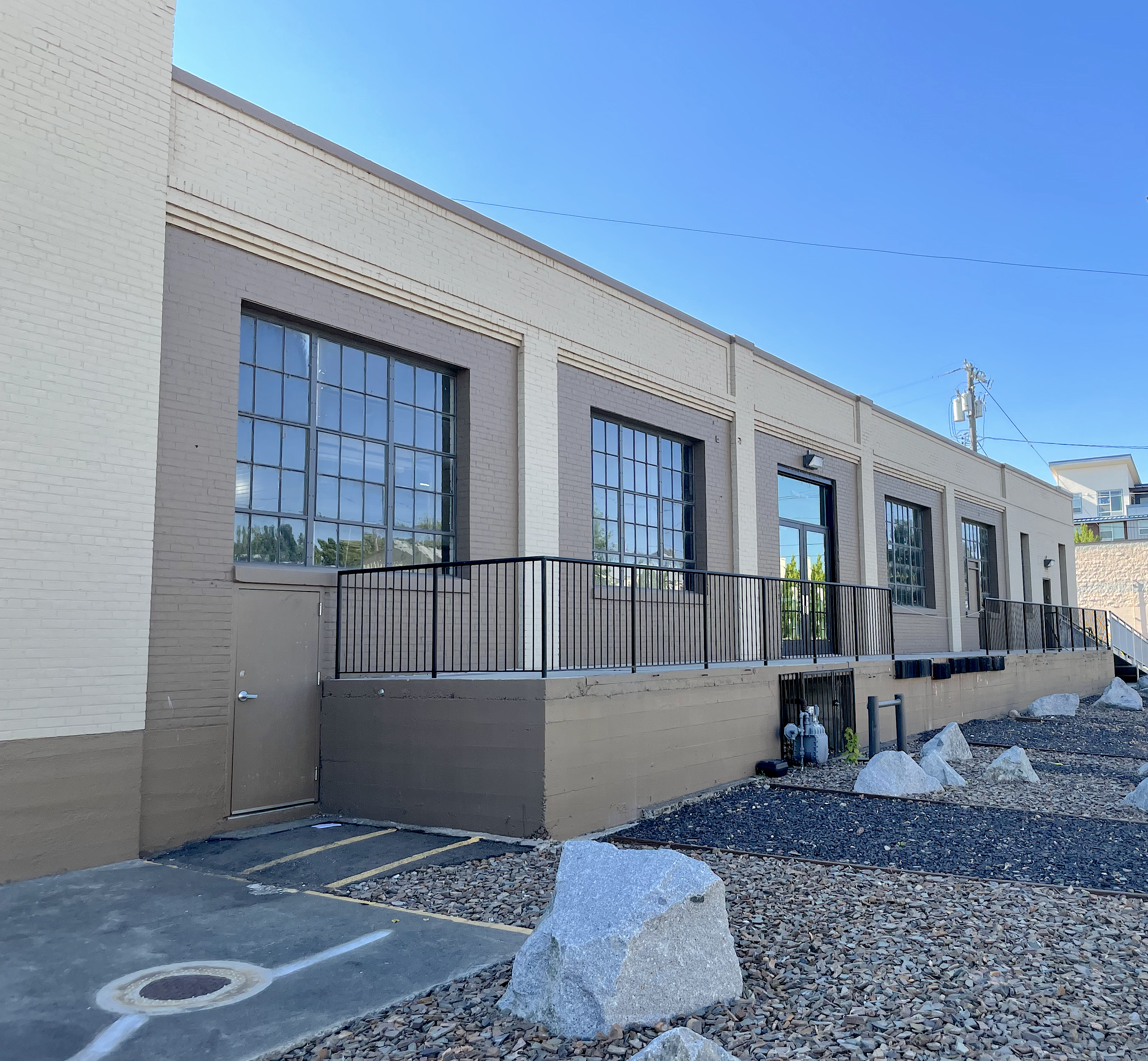
Peerless-Sunpuft Warehouse along Pearl St.

Located at 1107 N. Pearl, at the intersection of Pearl St. and Desmet Ave. on the far eastern end of the historic district, the Peerless-Sunpuft Inc. Office and Warehouse was constructed in 1925. It is a one-story brick building with a full basement. The building is rectangular in shape but asymmetrical in design with varying elevations around the structure. Contractor J.J. Cox built the structure for the Pioneer Warehouse Company. It was used by the Imperial Beverage Company, which moved in during 1926 and used the facility to bottle various beverages including ginger ale, fruit juice and mineral water, as well as syrups. Imperial Beverage Company manufactured hard beverages at larger facilities prior to prohibition, and once prohibition was repealed in 1933 the company moved out of its location in the historic district. Goetz Breweries moved in after Imperial Beverage left, and remodeled the interior to be more suitable for brewing operations. The remodel was estimated to cost $10,000. Goetz was only at the site for just two years before also moving to a larger facility. There are no records on the property from 1938 through 1947. In 1948, it was purchased by Gustav P. Harris, though the sale stipulated that for a period of 30 years the property could not be used for any aspect of the manufacture of beer or malt beverages. Since the 1948 sale, the building was occupied by various snack food wholesalers. In 2014, the building was purchased by Gonzaga University for $1 million, with an assessed value at the time of sale of $591,000. As of 2022, it is known as the Peerless Building and serves as an annex for Gonzaga's human physiology and theater programs.

== Demolished contributing properties ==
=== Burgan's Furniture Warehouse No. 2 ===
Formerly located at 7 E. Desmet, the Burgan's Furniture Warehouse No. 2 was constructed in 1904 by an unknown architect and builder. The second brick warehouse completed in the district, it was the first home of the Spokane branch of the Parlin & Orendorff Implement Company before their own building was built next door the following year. It was later occupied by another implement dealer, A.E. Powell. It was rectangular in shape and two stories tall with windows along its north and south faces. The building was demolished in 2009 as part of the renovation of the block and construction of the Ruby Suites hotel in the former Burgans Furniture store building in the northwest corner of the block and adjacent Burgan's Furniture Warehouse No. 1. Brick and wood from the building were preserved for use as decorations in Ruby Suites. Its location is now a parking lot.

=== Burgan's Furniture "E" Building Warehouse ===
Formerly located at 11 E. Desmet, the Burgan's Furniture "E" Building Warehouse was constructed at the Northwest corner of Desmet Avenue and Ruby Street in 1907 as a paint factory for the Jones & Dillingham Company. It was a brick building standing three-stories in height with many windows. The building was demolished in 2009 as part of the renovation of the block and construction of the Ruby Suites hotel in the former Burgan's Furniture store building in the northwest corner of the block and adjacent Burgan's Furniture Warehouse No. 1. Brick and wood from the building were preserved for use as decorations in Ruby Suites. Its location is now a parking lot.

== See also ==
- National Register of Historic Places listings in Spokane County, Washington
