= Logan, Spokane =

Logan
- Spokane Neighborhood
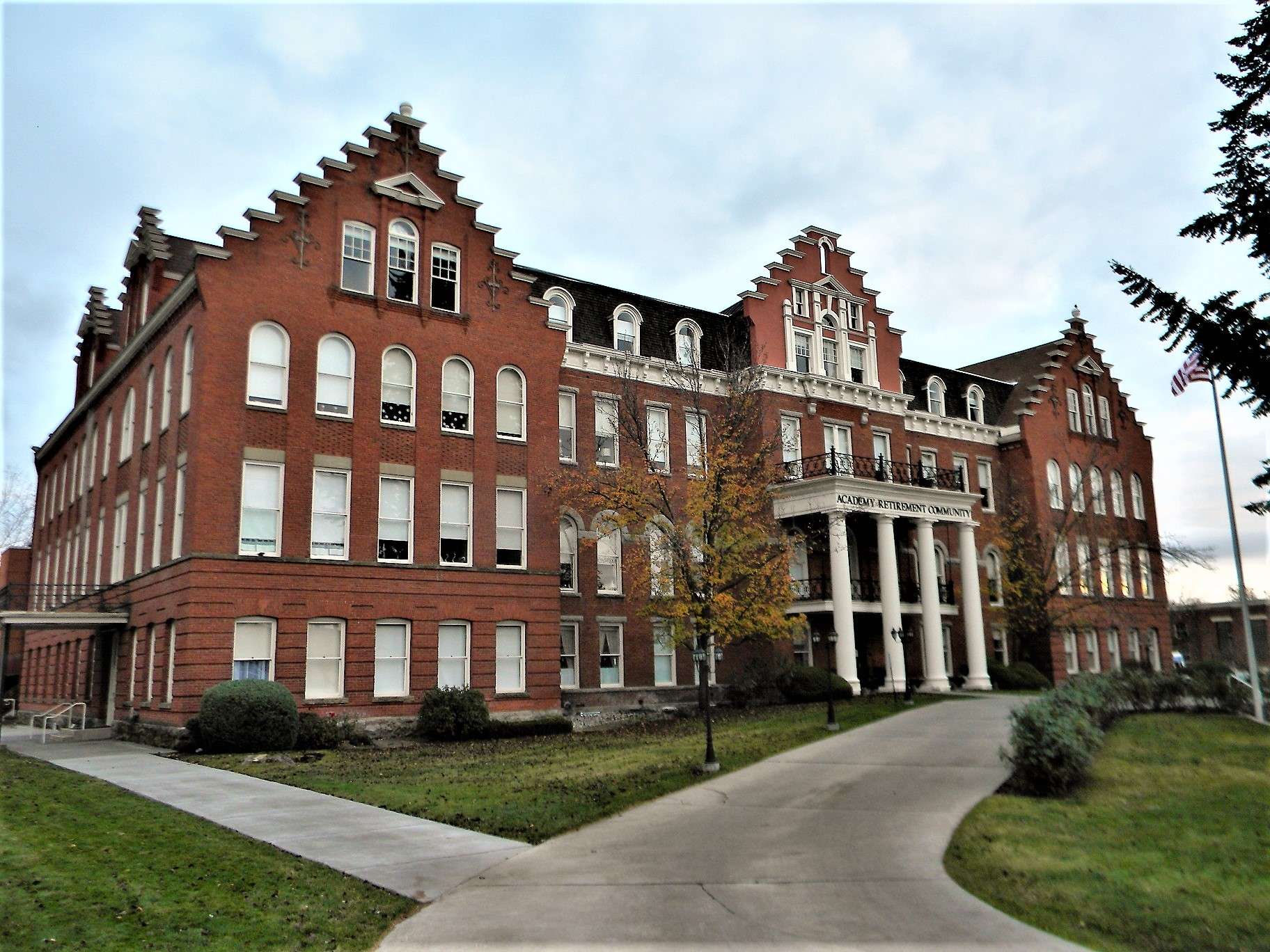
- Holy Names Academy Building, on the NRHP, in Logan.

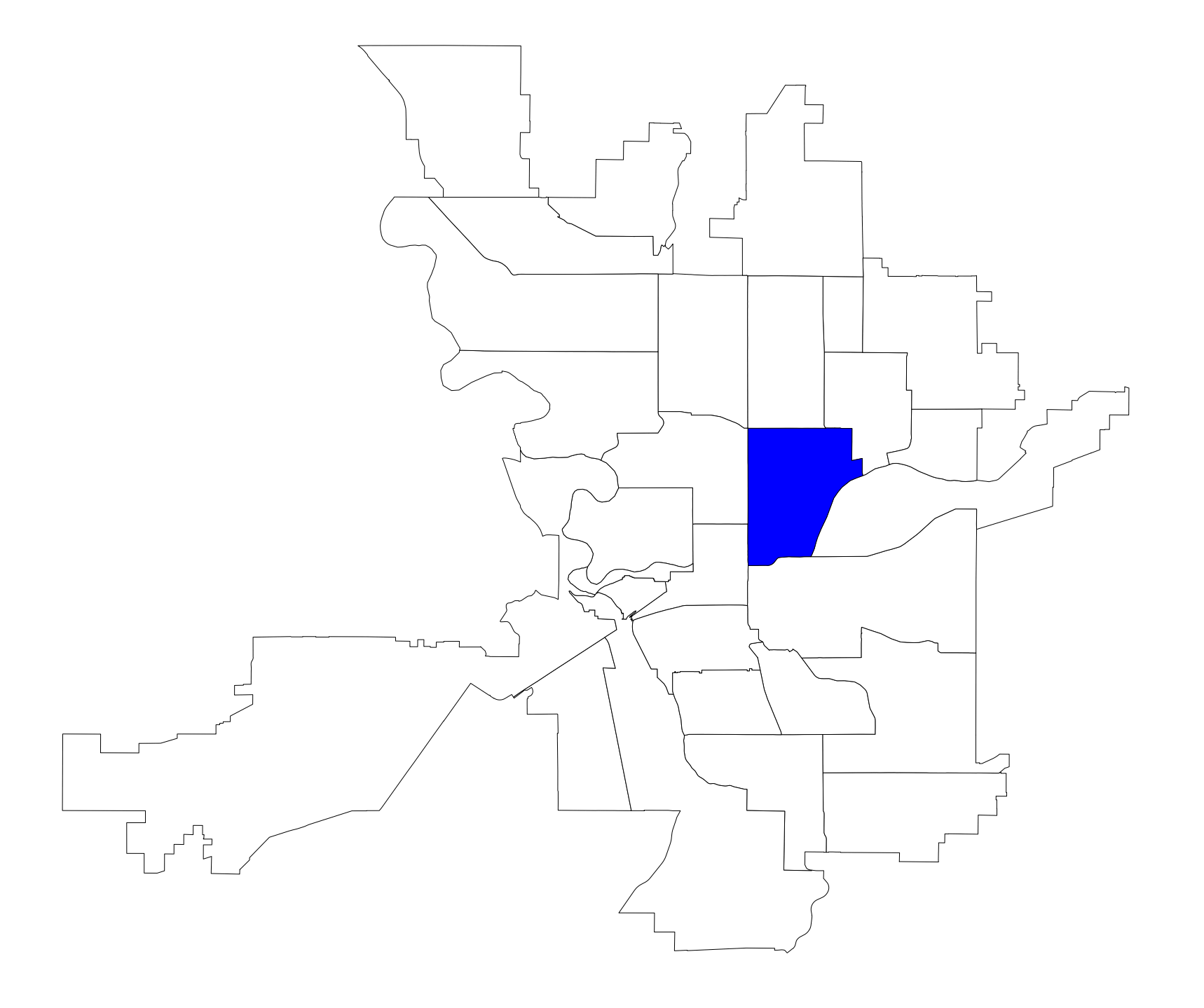
- Location within the city of Spokane
- Coordinates: 47°40′29.2″N 117°23′47.6″W
- Country: United States
- State: Washington
- County: Spokane
- City: Spokane

Population (2017)
  - Total: 10,831

Demographics 2017
  - White: 82.1%
  - Black: 3.2%
  - Latinx: 7.2%
  - Asian: 4.9%
  - Native American: 2%
- Time zone: UTC-8 (PST)
  - Summer (DST): UTC-7 (PDT)
- ZIP Codes: 99202, 99207 and 99258
- Area code: 509

Logan is a neighborhood in Spokane, Washington. It is located immediately northeast of Downtown Spokane and is home to Gonzaga University. The Spokane River runs along its eastern and southern edge. Due to its proximity to the city center, Logan is home to some of the oldest and densest areas in the city. It is known for its tree-lined streets, historic buildings and population of college students. In addition to numerous individual properties, there are two historic districts listed on the National Register of Historic Places located within Logan: the Desmet Avenue Warehouse Historic District and the Mission Avenue Historic District.

== Geography ==
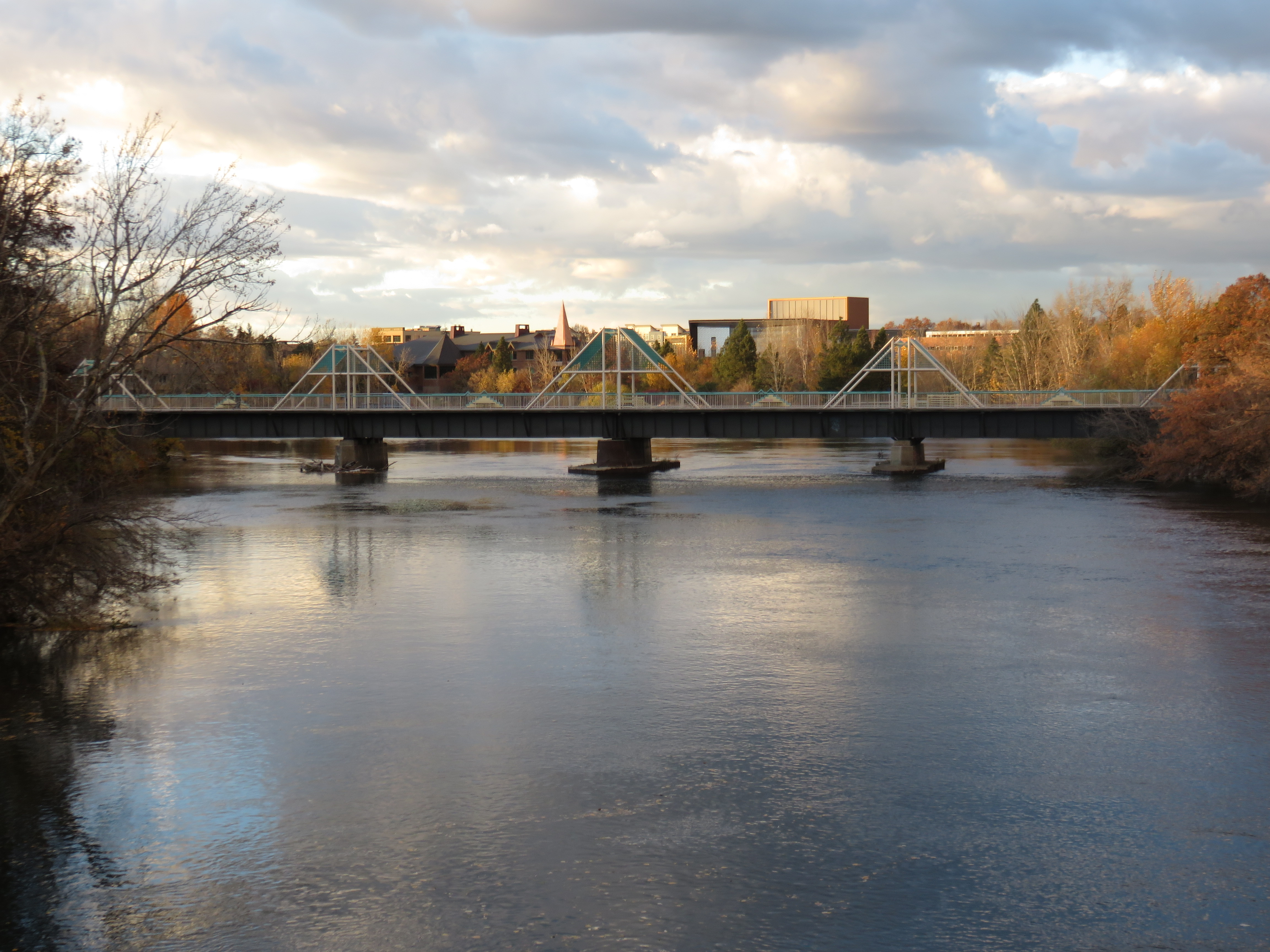
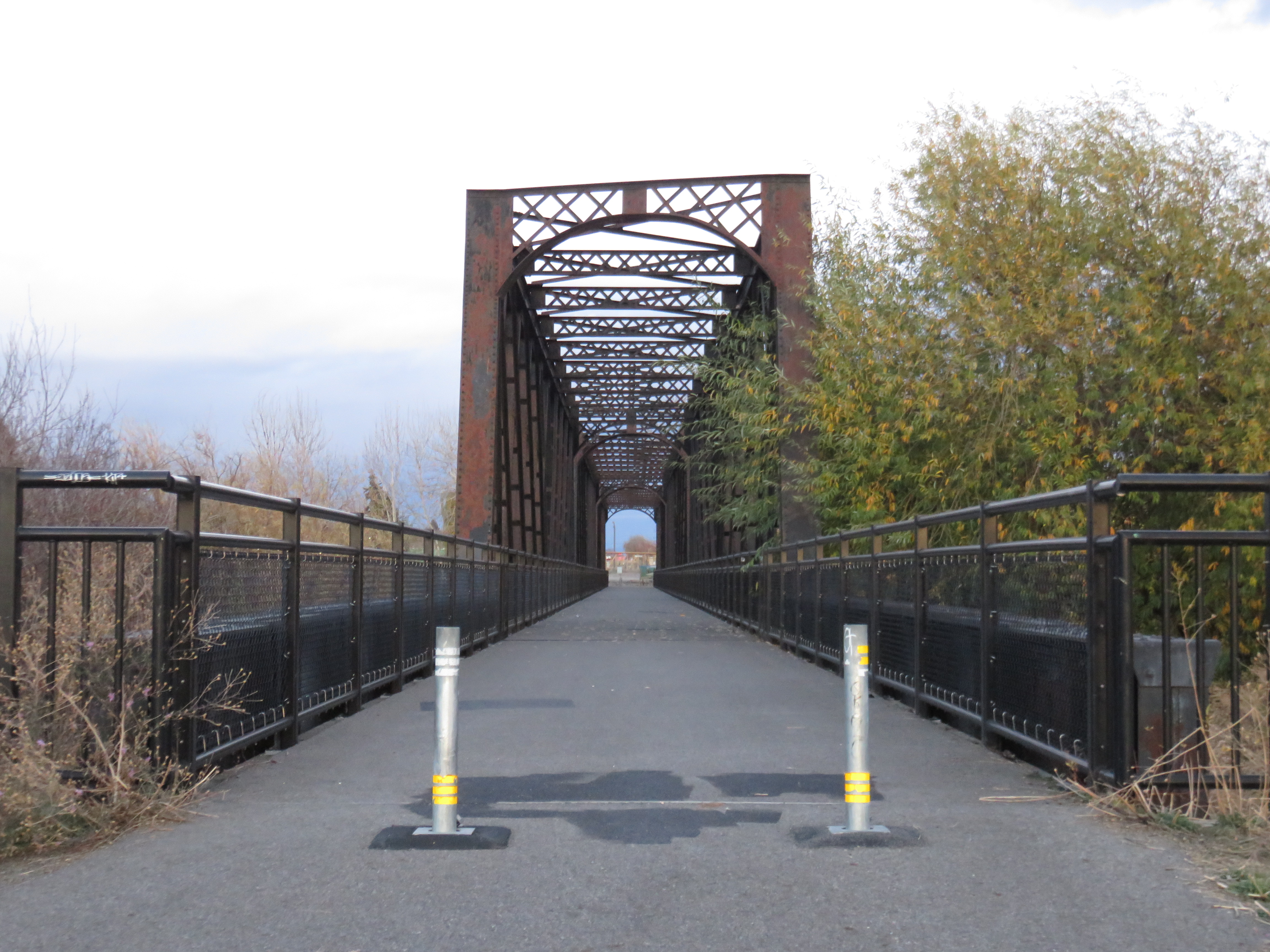
The Don Kardong Footbridge on the Centennial Trail and the Iron Bridge both cross the Spokane River from Logan into East Central and Chief Garry Park respectively

Logan is one of the central neighborhoods in Spokane, being located immediately adjacent to downtown and the rest of the city center. The Spokane River flows past Logan, first along the eastern edge of the neighborhood before turning to the west and providing the southern boundary. A stretch of Spokane Falls Boulevard and Trent Avenue, south of the river, act as the southern border of the neighborhood as well. Division Street, which carries U.S. Route 2 and serves as a major north-south thoroughfare in the city, serves as the western boundary. Euclid Avenue is the northern limit, from Division to Napa Street, though Illinois Avenue serves as that boundary from Napa to Crestline Street.

The Spokane River Centennial Trail passes through Logan.

Mission Avenue passes through Logan as a tree-lined boulevard from Division Street on the west all the way to Mission Park on the east side of the neighborhood. Mission, along with Spokane Falls Boulevard, Sharp Avenue, Indiana Avenue and North Foothills Drive, are east-to-west arterials in Logan. The Division and Ruby Street couplet on the west edge of the neighborhood, and Hamilton Street passing through the heart of Logan, serve as arterials for north-to-south travel. Pedestrian crossings of the Spokane River are located at Division, the Spokane River Centennial Trail, Spokane Falls Boulevard, Trent Avenue, Iron Bridge and Mission Avenue.

Higher education dominates the geography of the southern half of Logan. The campus of Gonzaga University stretches from the Spokane River on the south to Sharp on the north and Ruby on the west to Hamilton on the east. A handful of campus buildings are located north of Sharp and east of Hamilton. Gonzaga's campus forms the northern half of University District, which extends south of Logan to the Spokane campuses of Washington State University and Eastern Washington University.

To the north and east of Gonzaga's campus lie the tree-lined, residential sections of the Logan neighborhood. The historic character fades as you reach the northern edge of the neighborhood, however, and residential areas transition into commercial and light-industrial zones.

Hamilton Street serves as the neighborhood's main commercial and retail district. Zoned as part of Spokane's "centers and corridors" plan, higher density buildings are allowed on Hamilton than elsewhere in the neighborhood. The stretch of Hamilton nearest Gonzaga's campus is home to most of the neighborhoods bars and restaurants, giving the area a college town kind of atmosphere. Jack and Dan's, a landmark Spokane bar in continuous operation since the end of prohibition, is located at Hamilton and Sharp. Formerly owned by John Stockton's father, the eponymous Jack Stockton, the bar has many ties to the Gonzaga community and is frequently mentioned during television broadcasts of Gonzaga basketball games.

The terrain is mostly flat, though the northernmost edge of the neighborhood lies on a relatively steep incline leading up to the aptly named North Hill neighborhood.

== History ==
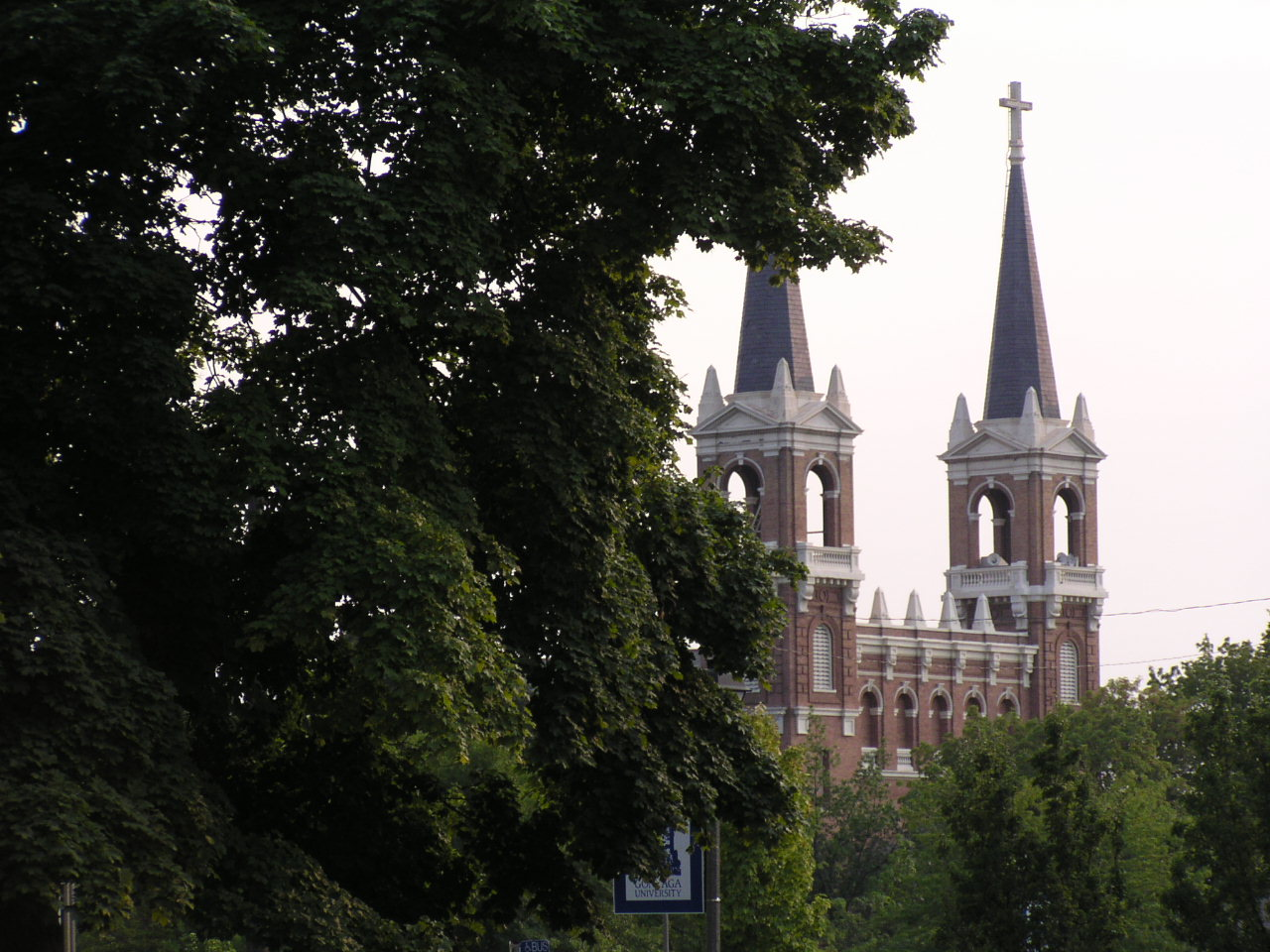
St. Aloysius church, on the Gonzaga University campus.

Initially platted between 1884 and 1889, Logan is one of the oldest neighborhoods in Spokane. It was developed initially as a suburb of nearby downtown Spokane with wide streets and landscaped boulevards. Gonzaga University, then known as Gonzaga College, was established in the neighborhood in 1887. Water and electricity from the City of Spokane arrived in 1892.

Logan is home to numerous properties on the Spokane Register of Historic Places. The neighborhood has many homes built in the early 1900s displaying the Queen Anne, Craftsman, Foursquare and Bungalow architectural styles. The Mission Avenue Historic District, which stretches for six blocks on Mission Avenue in Logan, is home to a high density of these historic homes. In the neighborhood's southwestern corner is the Desmet Avenue Warehouse Historic District, which features a collection of warehouse buildings constructed in the first decades of the 20th century. Both districts are listed on the National Register of Historic Places.

The growth of Gonzaga University since the men's basketball team's Cinderella run to the Elite Eight of the 1999 NCAA tournament has led to considerable change and new development in Logan. In the first years of the 2000s, much of the change took place off-campus, as the swelling student body expanded into rental housing off-campus. The physical nature of the neighborhood has changed as well, with construction of numerous new facilities and buildings on and around Gonzaga's campus over the years since 1999. This growth and expansion continues to the present, with Gonzaga involved in two construction projects as of 2021 worth a combined $116 million.

=== Historic places ===
In addition to the Desmet Avenue Warehouse Historic District and Mission Avenue Historic District, Logan is home to 4 individual properties listed on the National Register of Historic Places.

	Name on the Register	Image	Date listed	Location	Description
1	W. P. Fuller and Company Warehouse	W. P. Fuller and Company Warehouse	January 11, 1996 (#95001529)	E. 111 and E. 115 Desmet; 47°40′03″N 117°24′27″W	Built circa 1915; part of the Desmet Avenue Warehouse Historic District
2	Holy Names Academy Building	Holy Names Academy Building	May 2, 1986 (#86000959)	1216 N. Superior St. 47°40′08″N 117°23′28″W	Built in 1891.
3	Spokane Public Library	Spokane Public Library	August 3, 1982 (#82004291)	525 Mission St. 47°40′20″N 117°24′02″W	Built circa 1913. Part of the Mission Avenue Historic District.
4	Luther P. and Jane Marie Turner House	Luther P. and Jane Marie Turner House	December 23, 2003 (#03001343)	E. 1521 Illinois Ave; 47°40′47″N 117°22′20″W	Built in 1916.

== Demographics ==
As of 2017, 10,831 people lived in Logan across 3,349 households, 19% of which were households with children. People age 19 and under accounted for 28.7% of the population while those 65 and above accounted for 9.6% of residents. The former is above the citywide average and the latter is below. The median household income was $35,296, below the citywide average, and the percentage of children who qualified for free or reduced school lunch was 89.1%, well above the citywide average. 70.6% of households are rentals. 91.6% of residents were born in the United States or its territories. Of those who were not, 21.6% were from El Salvador, 14.9% from Ukraine, 9.6% from Mexico and 7.3% from Vietnam.

== Education ==
Logan is home to three Jesuit educational institutions covering the primary, secondary and post-secondary levels. Gonzaga University offers undergraduate and post-graduate programs. Gonzaga Preparatory School, commonly known as G-Prep, is a Jesuit high school. St. Aloysius Gonzaga Catholic School, commonly known as St. Al's, is a K-8 school.

Public schools in the neighborhood are operated by Spokane Public Schools. Logan is home to Logan Elementary, which serves the entire neighborhood. Logan feeds into Yasuhara Middle School, which is also located in the neighborhood, and then into North Central High School in the adjacent Emerson/Garfield neighborhood.

== Transportation ==
=== Highway ===
- - U.S. 2 - to Newport (north) and Spokane (south)

U.S. 2 passes north–south as the western boundary of Logan along the Division/Ruby couplet.

- - U.S. 395 - to Colville (north) and Spokane (south)

U.S. 395 passes north–south as the western boundary of Logan along the Division/Ruby couplet.

- - State Route 290 - to Idaho State Highway 53 (east) and Spokane (west)

State Route 290 passes east–west as the southern boundary of Logan along Trent and has its western terminus just south of the Logan neighborhood at Interstate 90.

=== Surface Streets ===
For cyclists, dedicated bike lanes run east to west through Logan on Indiana and Sharp Avenues. Shared use paths for cyclists and pedestrians also exist in Logan. The Spokane River Centennial Trail runs along the river connecting Logan with Downtown to the west and to points east as far as Idaho. The Don Kardong Footbridge and Iron Bridge carry automobile-free paths across the river, while a bridge carries the Centennial Trail over Hamilton Street at Gonzaga's campus.

The neighborhood is connected to the rest of the city street system by four roads classified as urban principal arterials. The Division Street/Ruby Street couplet and Hamilton Avenue connect Logan to points north and south, while Mission Avenue and Spokane Falls Boulevard/Trent Avenue connect Logan to the east and west. Logan is connected to the wider world by U.S. Route 2 which is routed along the Division/Ruby couplet and Washington State Route 290 which runs along Spokane Falls Boulevard and Trent Avenue. From the intersection of Hamilton and Trent there is a bridge over the river which connects drivers to Interstate 90 on the south side of the river.

=== Public Transit ===
The Spokane Transit Authority, the region's public transportation provider, serves Logan with five fixed schedule bus lines.

Route	Termini			Service operation and notes	Streets traveled
1; City Line	Browne's Addition	↔	Chief Garry Park; Spokane Community College at Bay	Operates daily	Mission
25; Division	Downtown Spokane; STA Plaza	↔	Fairwood; Hastings Park & Ride	High-frequency route	Division/Ruby couplet
26; Lidgerwood	Downtown Spokane; STA Plaza	↔	Shiloh Hills; Northpointe Shopping Center	Basic-frequency route	Spokane Falls, Hamilton
27; Hillyard	Downtown Spokane; STA Plaza	↔	Balboa/South Indian Trail; Five Mile Park & Ride	Basic-frequency route; Five Mile Park & Ride via Hillyard	Indiana, Dakota, Illinois, Perry
28; Nevada	Downtown Spokane; STA Plaza	↔	Country Homes; Whitworth University	Basic-frequency route	Spokane Falls, Hamilton

The STA's City Line will also serve Logan when it begins service at the planned date of July 2023. The City Line will connect Browne's Addition in the west with Downtown, Logan, Chief Garry Park and Spokane Community College on the east. The City Line's fleet of all-electric buses will be scheduled to arrive every 7.5 minutes during peak hours. The City Line will enter Logan along Spokane Falls Boulevard, travel through the Gonzaga campus along Cincinnati Street before turning east on Mission Avenue.
