= Mission Avenue Historic District =

- U.S. National Register of Historic Places
- U.S. Historic district
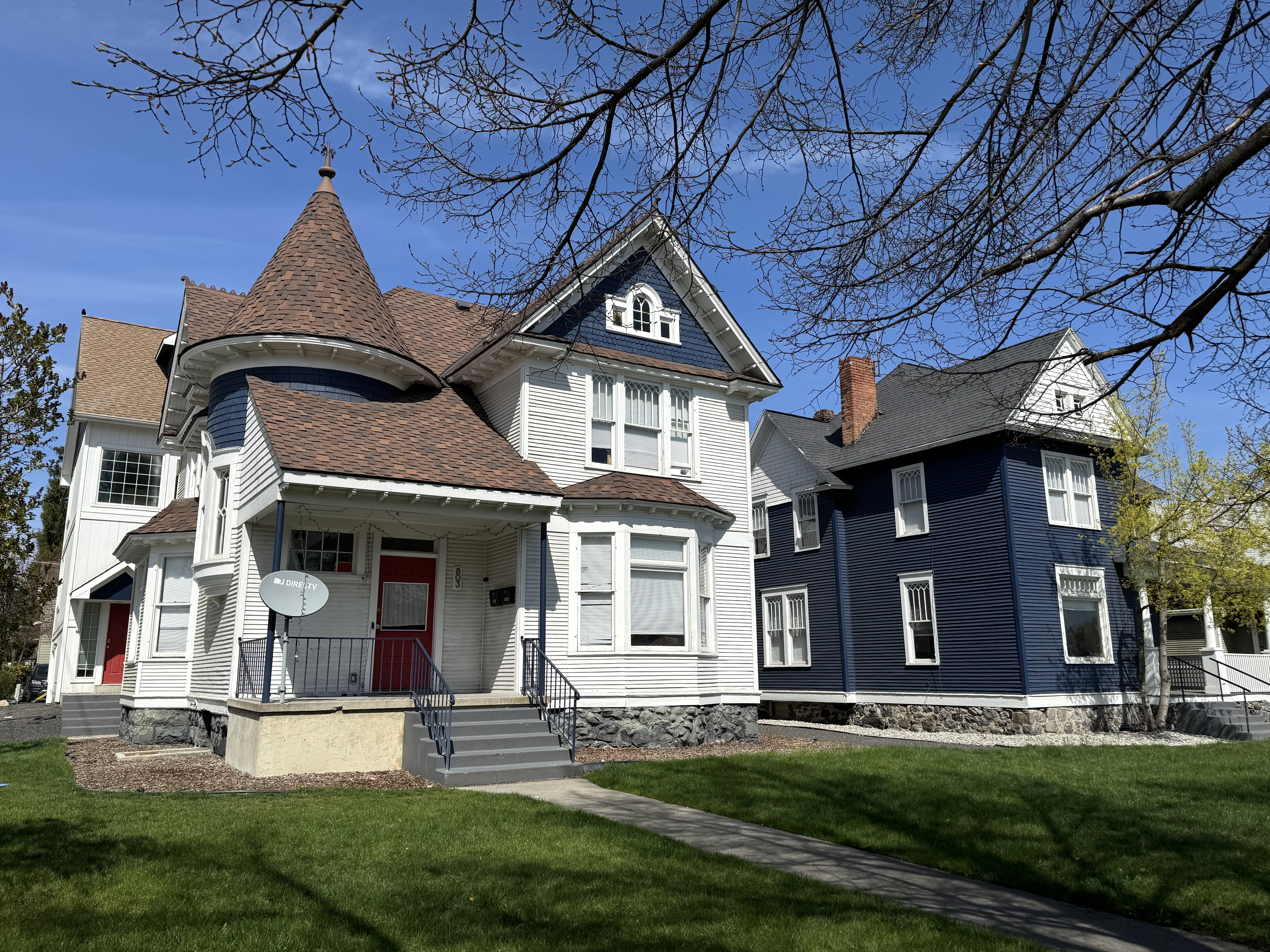
- Homes on the 800 block of Mission Avenue

- Location within Spokane riverfront area Location within Washington (state) Location within the United States
- Location: Mission Ave., Spokane, Washington
- Coordinates: 47°40′18″N 117°24′05″W
- Built: 1894-1930s
- Architect: Multiple
- Architectural style: American Craftsman, American Foursquare, Bungalow, Colonial Revival and Queen Anne
- NRHP reference No.: 86002644
- Added to NRHP: August 14, 1986

The Mission Avenue Historic District is a National Register of Historic Places (NRHP) listed historic district in the Logan neighborhood of Spokane, Washington. The historic district is located in a residential area stretching along Mission Avenue from the west side of Lidgerwood Street to nearly Hamilton Street on the east.

Located roughly one mile from the Downtown Spokane, where the city was initially settled, the Mission Avenue Historic District is set in one of the first residential areas to be platted and developed in Spokane. Platting of what became the district began in 1884 with initial development continuing through 1890, the Mission Avenue area and Logan Neighborhood in general were one of the early streetcar suburbs in the city. Single family homes along the tree-lined Mission Avenue boulevard were designed in numerous styles including American Craftsman, American Foursquare, Bungalow, Colonial Revival and Queen Anne.

Unlike other NRHP-listed residential historic districts in Spokane like the Browne's Addition Historic District, Ninth Avenue Historic District, Rockwood Historic District and Marycliff-Cliff Park Historic District which housed the city's moneyed elite, Mission Avenue was home to a cross-section of the middle and upper-middle class. Julius Zittel, a prominent architect who left his mark in historic districts around the city, was a prominent early resident along Mission Avenue.

Presently, Mission Avenue serves as a major arterial on the near north side of Spokane, but retains the tree-lined nature and manicured boulevard of its original design. Several intrusive structures have been built in the decades since the initial development was completed in the 1930s, but the NRHP considered this stretch of Mission Avenue intact enough to warrant inclusion on the national register. The neighborhood still maintains a largely middle-class character, though it has become increasingly influenced by the presence of students from Gonzaga University, located just two blocks south of Mission Avenue.

== Setting ==
As the name implies, the Mission Avenue Historic District is located along Mission Avenue, between Lidgerwood and Hamilton Streets, in the Logan neighborhood of Spokane's near north side. The city center is roughly one mile to the southwest of the district. This location near the core of the city made it an ideal location for residential development during Spokane's formative years.

Mission Avenue is classified as an "urban principal arterial," the highest classification of surface streets in Spokane. The east—west street is the first such arterial north of the river and as a result a major and busy thoroughfare connecting the Logan neighborhood with points both east and west. Hamilton Street, less than a block beyond the eastern edge of the district, and Ruby Street, just over one block west of the district, are also classified as urban principal arterials and serve as two of the main thoroughfares traveling north from the city center. This level of traffic has led Mission Avenue to be among the streets included in City of Spokane plans for traffic calming and transit improvements. The City Line bus rapid transit system, which began service in 2023, passes through the eastern end of the historic district.

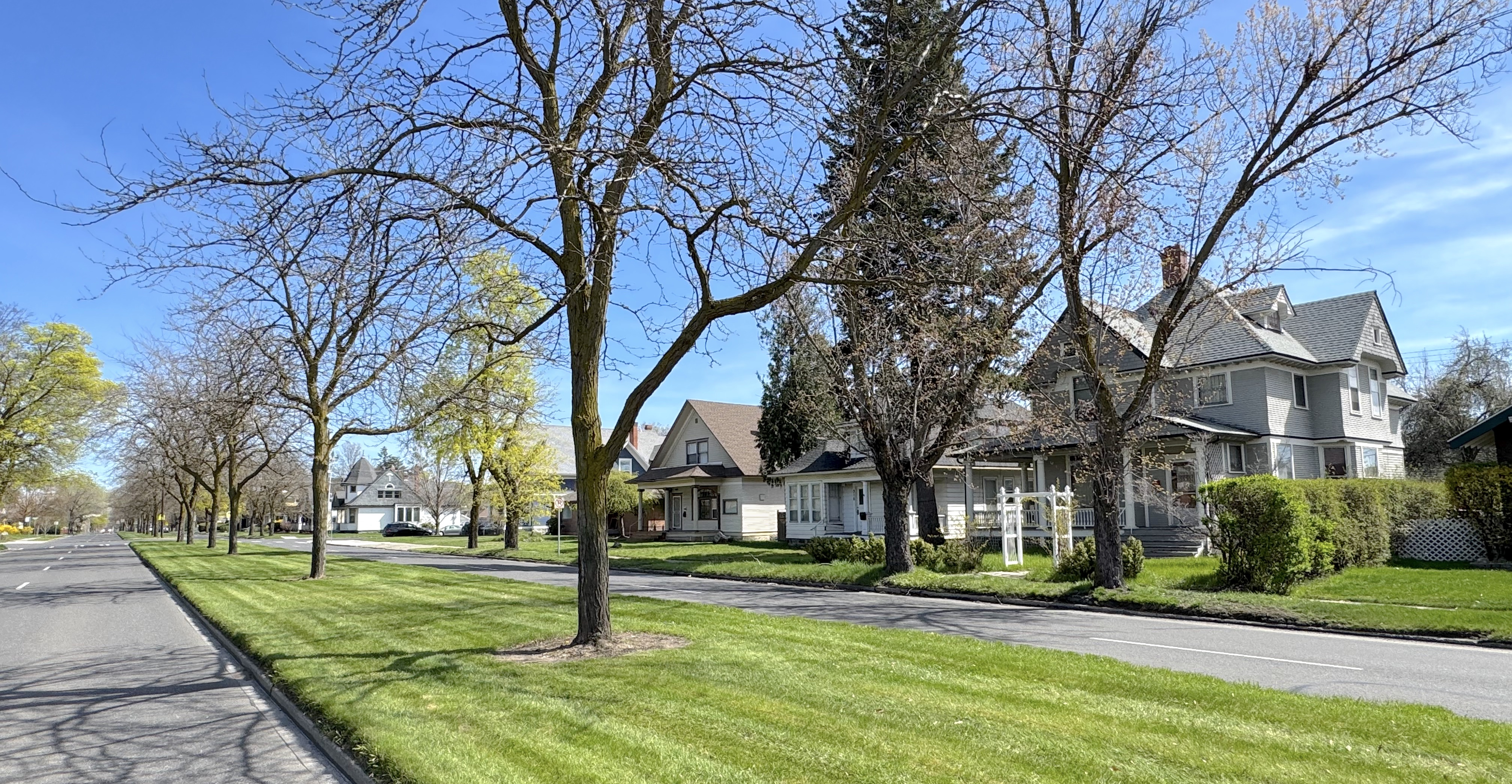
Parkway in Mission Avenue

Through the district, Mission Avenue was platted as a 100-foot-wide street with a parkway boulevard running down the middle. The parkway begins at Ruby Street, a block-and-a-half west of the historic district, and continues to Cincinnati Street near the western edge of the district. It is interrupted for two blocks on either side of Hamilton Street before picking back up and running east to Mission Park on the eastern edge of the Logan Neighborhood. Trees lining the parkway are a mix of black locust and honey locust.

The campus of Gonzaga University comes within a half block of the historic district, with the bulk of the campus located two blocks to the south across Sharp Avenue.

== History ==
What is now the Mission Avenue Historic District, like the rest of the city of Spokane and surrounding area, was inhabited by the Spokane people for centuries prior to contact with European settlers.

The Mission Avenue Historic District as it exists today traces its history to the early days of white settlement in Spokane. The neighborhood was first platted in 1884, only three years after the city's incorporation in 1881. Areas south of Mission Avenue had been annexed into the city prior to platting, in 1883, with areas north of Mission brought into the City of Spokane in 1891. Initial platting of the Mission Avenue area was undertaken by Sylvester Heath. Development was further spurred on when land in the area was obtained by Jesuits who founded what is now Gonzaga University on land immediately south of the present historic district.

Construction of homes in the district began in the 1890s and continued with regularity through the first decade of the 20th century. That first era of construction was dominated by larger homes, notably of the Queen Anne, Colonial Revival and American Foursquare styles. A second building boom around 1910 saw remaining land in the neighborhood filled in with more modest Bungalow-style homes. A third, smaller wave of construction took place from the 1920s into 1930s and saw period-revival style homes built that, while decades newer than the original homes along Mission Avenue, were visually and architecturally similar. Those three waves, with their cohesive set of styles, would comprise the basis for the district's inclusion on the NRHP.

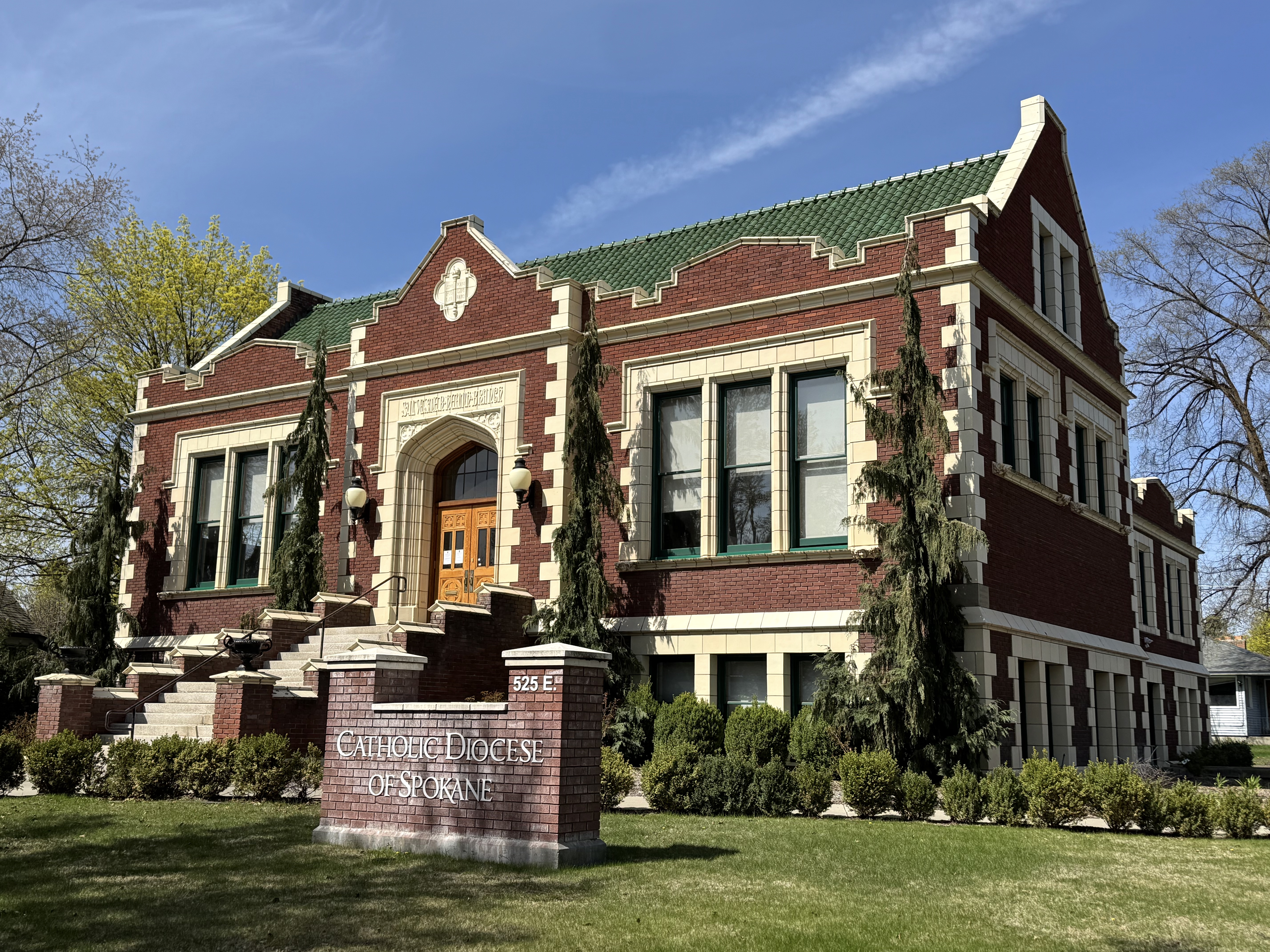
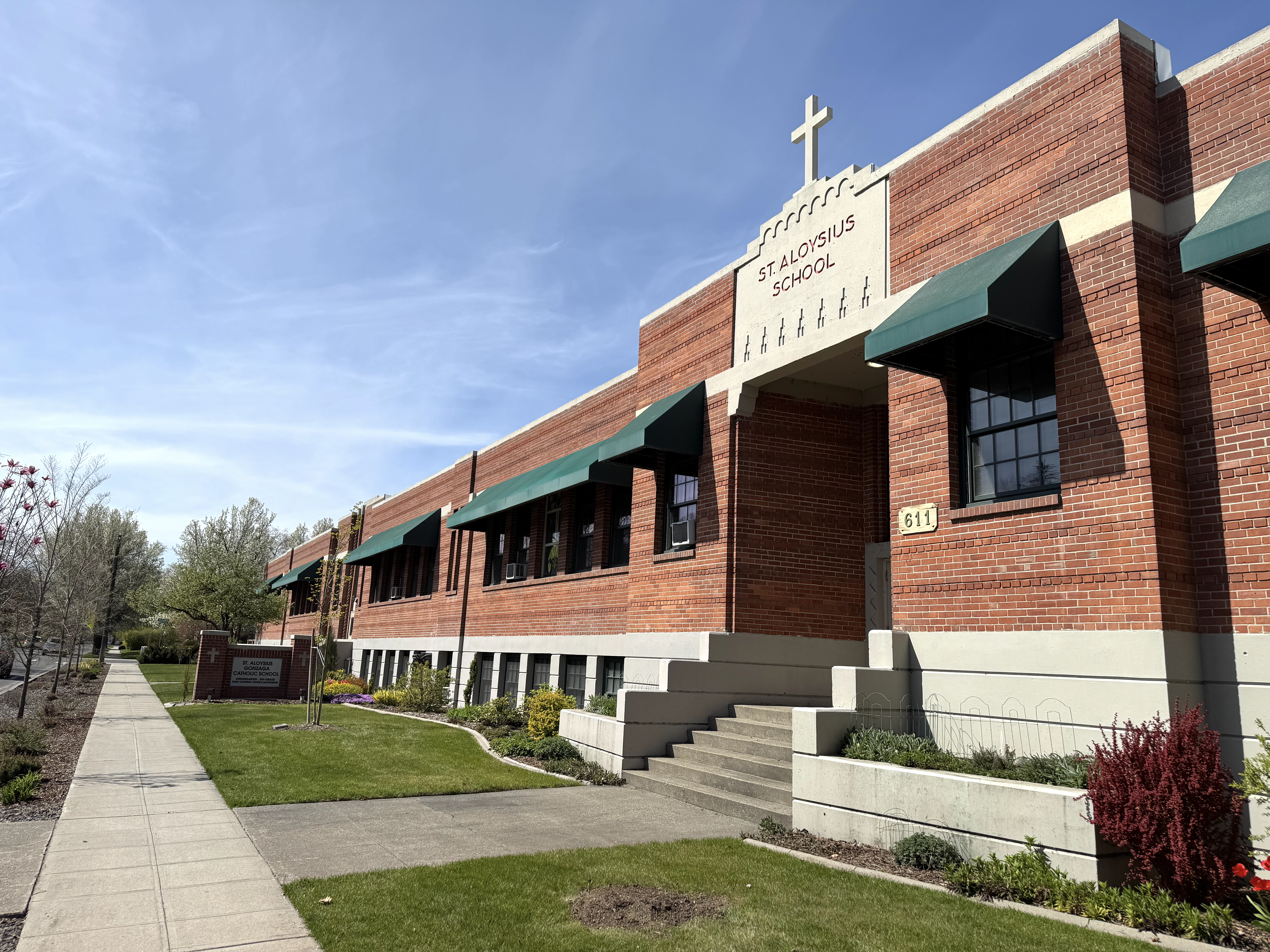
The Heath Branch (left) and St. Aloysius Gonzaga School (right)

One notable contributing structure in the district that was not built for residential purposes is the Heath Branch of the Spokane Public Library, constructed in 1914 and designed by Julius Zittel, a resident of the district. The Heath Branch was listed on the NRHP on its own merit in 1982, prior to the district's inclusion as a whole. As of 2025, it is home to offices of the Catholic Dioceses of Spokane, one of numerous examples of Catholic influence in the district.

Another non-residential building considered contributing to the historic district is St. Aloysius Gonzaga Catholic School, a Jesuit school and another example of the Catholic, specifically Jesuit, influence on the neighborhood. Constructed in 1940, the block-long red brick structure with a low vertical profile integrates well with the numerous low brick homes constructed around the same time, as well as the Heath Branch located directly to the west. While its art deco embellishments do not mesh with the other styles prominent in the district, it was considered to be a contributing structure, along with the library, due to its function serving the immediate community.

After those three waves of home construction, several "non-contributing" structures would be built over the decades. Five single-story brick residences were constructed in the 1950s, though their low height profile was considered insignificant to seriously detract from the visual cohesion of the district. The late-1960s through mid-1970s saw more intrusive construction of multi-story apartment buildings. When the district was listed on the NRHP in 1986, there were 48 total structures considered to contribute to the historic nature of the district, 44 of which were houses. Non-contributing structures totaled 52 sites, though only 10 were homes or apartments, with the bulk being secondary buildings like sheds and garages.

As the decades passed, the visual character of the district remained largely intact, but the demographics of the neighborhood changed. With increased enrollment at Gonzaga University, demand for housing led to many homes being converted from single-family into apartments. Commercial development encroached upon the district, notably along Hamilton Street to the east and the Division/Ruby corridor to the west.

== Gallery ==
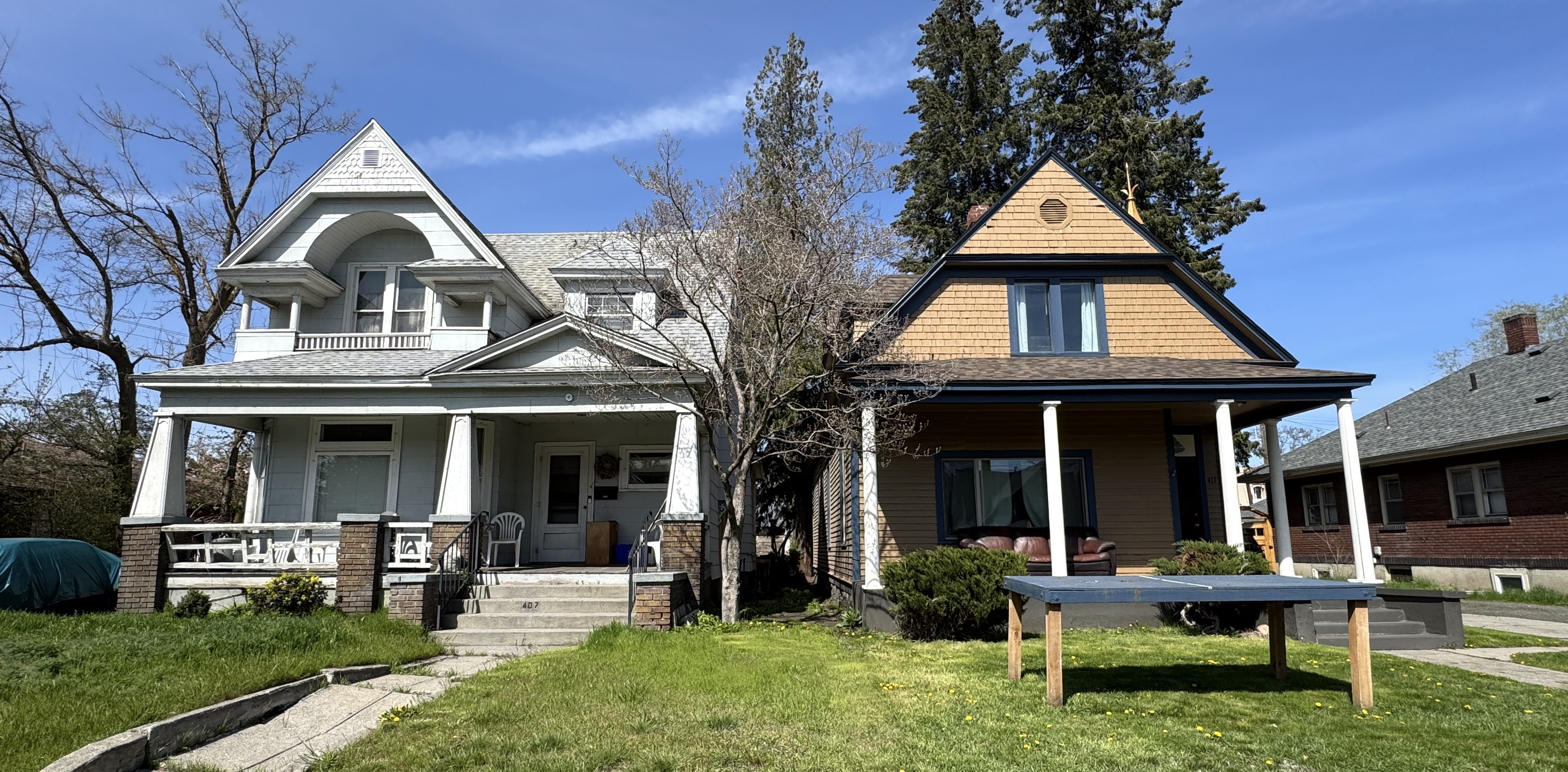
Homes on the 400 block

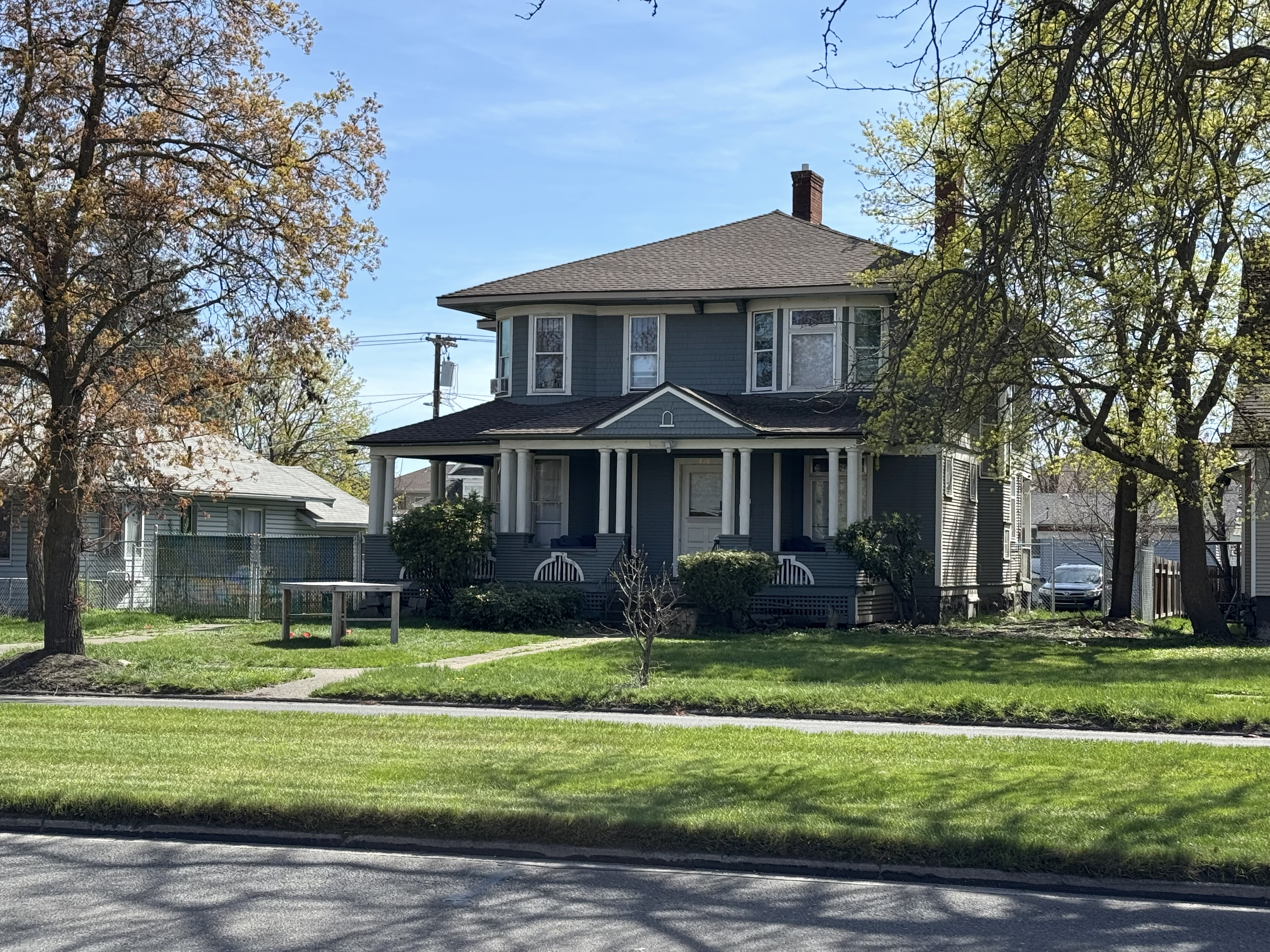
Home on the 600 block, showing the boulevard

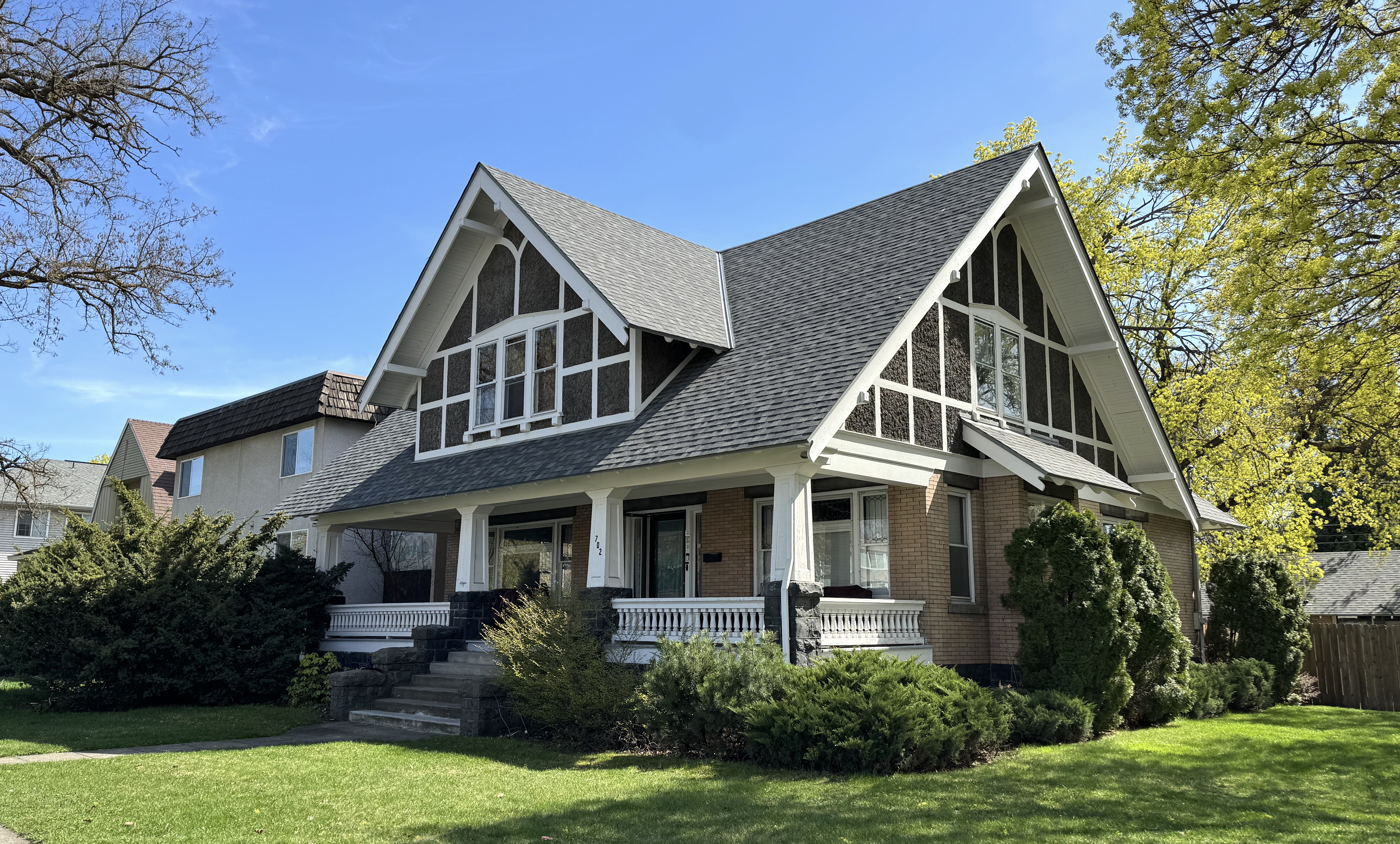
Home on the 700 block

== See also ==
- National Register of Historic Places listings in Spokane County, Washington
