= Great Spokane Fire =

1889 disaster in Washington state

Coordinates: 47.656005168388376°N 117.4246691935352°W

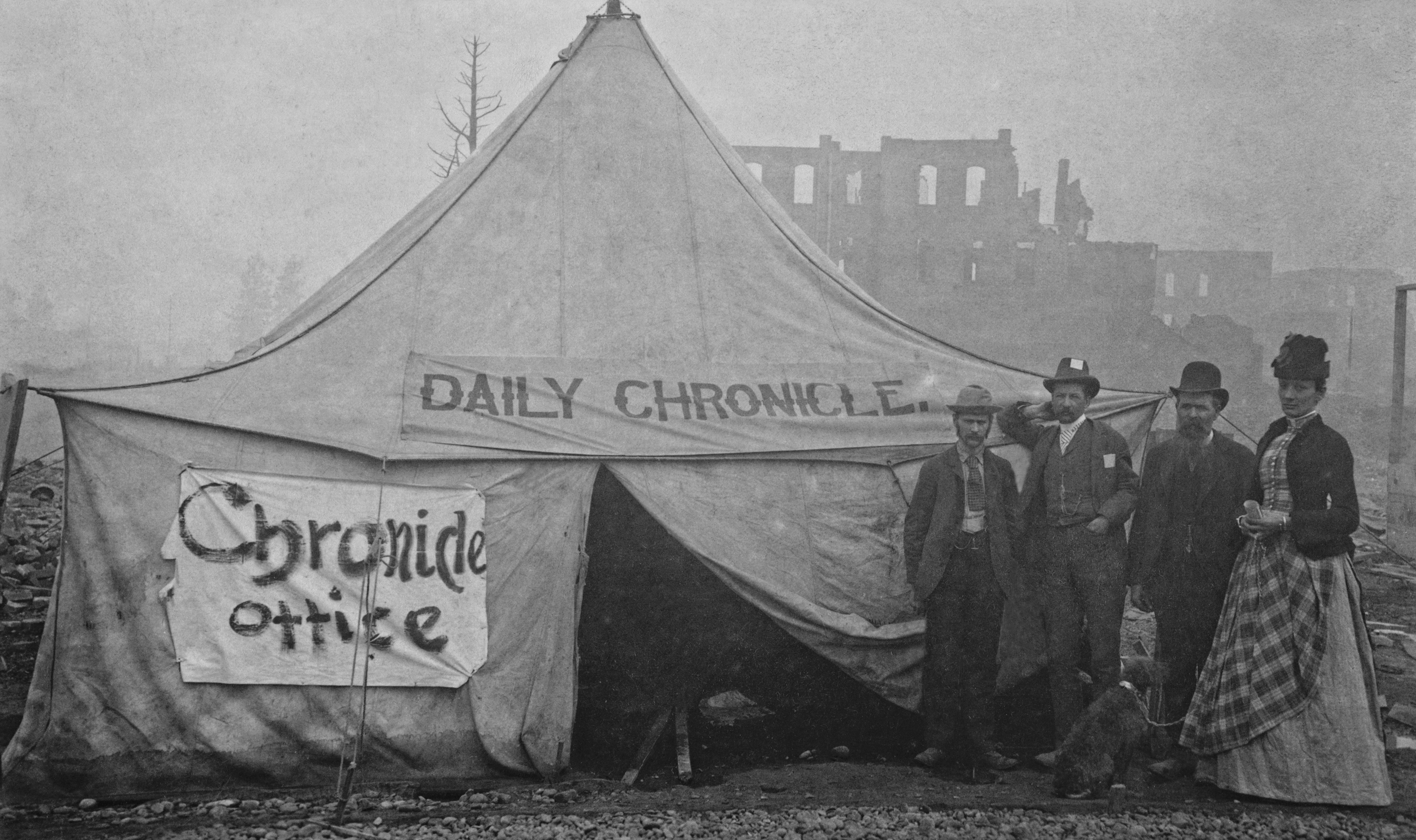
- The makeshift Daily Chronicle office after the fire
- Date: August 4, 1889; 6:00 pm; (PST)
- Location: Spokane, Washington

Impacts
- Deaths: 1

Ignition
- Cause: Unknown

The Great Spokane Fire—known locally as The Great Fire—affected downtown Spokane, Washington (called "Spokane Falls" at the time) on August 4, 1889. It began just after 6:00 p.m. and destroyed the city's downtown commercial district. Due to technical problems with a pump station, there was no water pressure in the city when the fire started. In a desperate bid to starve the fire, firefighters began razing buildings with dynamite. Eventually winds died down and the fire exhausted of its own accord. As a result of the fire and its aftermath, virtually all of Spokane's downtown was destroyed, though only one person was killed.

The cause of the fire was never determined. Theories included a cooking fire in a lunchroom, a curling iron being heated in a kerosene lamp, and a spark from a passing train.

== Timeline ==
The summer of 1889 had been hot and dry. Smokey haze from wildfires burning in the Coeur d’Alene mountains had covered the city for days. Spokane Falls, as it was known then, had 47 fire hydrants and a volunteer fire department with 100 men divided into twelve fire stations. They had 25,000 feet of fire hose, two hose carts and a hook and ladder truck, but all this had to be pulled by the firefighters as they had no horses. All of the structures near the Northern Pacific Railway tracks were built of wood and great majority of them housed restaurants with their accompanying kitchens.

At 6:16 on August 4 a fire started in one of the buildings across the street from the railway passenger depot, caused either by a cooking fire in a restaurant or an overturned kerosene lamp in one of the lodging houses. The fire started small and the fire department responded promptly when summoned. However, there was no water in the hydrant system. The superintendent of the city waterworks was out of town. He had left a subordinate in charge who, though later found to be experienced and competent, could not raise the pressure in the system.

The fire grew enough to create a wind to fan its own growth, and this was augmented by the prevailing winds, which tended to come from the southwest. They pushed the fire northward all the way to the river. The post office, land office, all the banks, major office blocks and hotels burned. Only two of the city’s bridges remained unburnt.

Citizens were able to send out word of the fire by telegraph, but after the office, telegraph poles and lines burned, communication along that route was halted until telegraph workers could improvise connections at the broken wire ends.

All available explosives were gathered and buildings on street corners were dynamited in the attempt to slow the fire’s spread. While this did not completely stop the fire, it saved City Hall and the offices of one of the newspapers. The wind carried burning embers north over the river, where demolition continued and helped stop the fire’s spread. Though a train was due to arrive by midnight, the wind shifted and the passenger depot, the freight depot, some rolling stock and six blocks’ worth of track at the station had been destroyed.

The fire was controlled after three hours. Streets were cordoned off with ropes and access was restricted only to those who could prove a need of it. The only fatality was caused when a man who had been sleeping in his room was trapped by the fire and leapt from his second-story window into the street.

Surrounding communities, from Helena, Montana to Yakima, Washington, sent very generous donations of cash, food and other aid. The day after the fire, the waterworks superintendent was "permitted to resign", though it was later found that one of the water mains had sprung multiple leaks after the fire started.

Allegations arose that local officials had stolen relief supplies. Two city councilors and a police officer were indicted and, while they were never charged because the main witness against them had moved away, the council at that time was referred to as the "ham council".

Despite this catastrophe, Spokane continued to grow; the fire set the stage for a building boom. Architect Chauncey B. Seaton came to Spokane to work on rebuilding projects after the fire. He designed the Review Building. The town hosted the Northwest Industrial Exposition in 1890. The main building was designed by Richard H. Martin, Jr.

After the Great Fire of 1889 and the rebuilding of the downtown, the city was reincorporated under the present name of Spokane in 1891.

== See also ==
- Great Fire of 1910
- Great Seattle Fire
- Great Ellensburg Fire
