= 1891 State Normal School at Cheney fire =

Fire in Cheney, Washington, United States

Coordinates: 47.490718°N 117.586284°W

The 1891 State Normal School at Cheney fire was a conflagration on the morning of August 27, 1891, that consumed the only building then housing the State Normal School at Cheney in Cheney, Washington. There were no deaths, but the destruction of the building sparked a multi-year battle with the governor and state legislature regarding whether the normal school would be shuttered, or whether the state would authorize funds for the construction of a replacement building.

== Background ==
At the time of the fire, the institution originally known as the Benjamin P. Cheney Academy had only been in place for nine years, operating for most of those years as a school for local children. The campus's original building, built in the fall of 1881, was a wooden structure, measuring 36×66 ft; by August 1891, the school (renamed the State Normal School at Cheney shortly after Washington became a state in 1889) was constructing an addition of four classrooms and a gymnasium to accommodate rising enrollment and the needs of the new normal school curriculum.

The town around the campus, Cheney, Washington, has been described by historians as a "tough little town," and "the last camping-ground of the American frontier." It was home to speculators and opportunists, like most other frontier towns at the time.

== Fire ==
Early on the morning of August 27, 1891 (at around 12:45 am), just one week before the fall term was scheduled to begin, the Cheney fire department responded to a blaze at the State Normal School. According to the Spokane Daily Chronicle, fire officials believed the fire began when a leaking hydrant soaked a pile of lime next to the building, where new construction at the building site was underway. J. Orin Oliphant, writing the institution's first published history in 1924, cited the reminiscences of a Cheney resident in claiming that "the fire started on the northeast side, in a heated mortar bed, which was too close to the wooden basement wall." According to the Chronicle, the fire department arrived on the scene almost immediately, but the flames consumed the building so quickly that "the efforts of the firemen were useless."

== Immediate impact ==
The Pomeroy Block, where the State Normal School at Cheney was temporarily located from 1891–1893 (photo taken ca. 1915)

The building, then valued at $10,000, burned to the ground as a total loss. It had contained a large number of new books and materials, along with a brand new piano, that had just been acquired for the upcoming school year. Since the structure had contained the entire institution, the school had to make arrangements to resume classes in another building while the state debated an appropriation to rebuild. The university had an insurance policy on the building, but the policy had been made payable to the Washington State Legislature instead of to the school itself. This left the university in limbo without any funding to rebuild.

The community immediately helped to secure a location by September 2, 1891, so the normal school could open in time for the fall term. There are some discrepancies in available sources regarding exactly what arrangements were made. Oliphant indicates that, for the first week of the term, the trustees of Cheney's public school offered the temporary use of their building until more permanent accommodations could be found; in contrast, the August 28, 1891 edition of the Seattle Post-Intelligencer claims that by that date, the normal school's Board of Trustees had already made arrangements for rented storefronts in downtown Cheney. Regardless, sources agree that by the end of the term's first week the normal school had set up in rented space in the Pomeroy building in downtown Cheney. The temporary school "location was poor, the rooms small, and the hallways dark and narrow," but despite that reality, the normal school remained in operation there until 1893.

== Long-term impact ==
The loss of the building, which was under-insured, threw the future of the school into doubt. Established originally as an academy by a private endowment from Benjamin Pierce Cheney, the school had only begun to operate as a normal school in October 1890. Funding normal schools in the state had been a contentious budget issue. Governor McGraw exercised his veto in the spring of 1893 to hold back $85,000 of funds that had been approved by the legislature to rebuild the school; the veto was widely derided by newspaper editorials around the state, including pieces in the Cheney Sentinel, the Seattle Post-Intelligencer, and the Seattle Telegraph.

In response, the residents of Cheney voted overwhelmingly (262–13 in favor) for a bond measure to finance the building of a public school building, which the city would loan to the State Normal School until such time as its own building could be erected. The principal of the State Normal School at Cheney, William J. Sutton, described the loaned building as "a commodious 2-storied brick building ... one of the most complete and convenient school buildings in the state. It will be supplied with water from the city water works, with electric light, electric bells and heated by steam." The normal school would occupy this loaned public school building from the fall of 1893 until 1896.

Governor McGraw's biennial budget priorities for 1895 remained opposed to the rebuilding of the State Normal School at Cheney: in his annual message, McGraw emphasized that "it was owing to no personal feeling or antipathy of opinion that the veto power was exercised in the cases of the Cheney and Whatcom Normal Schools," but reiterated his conviction that the people of the state should not be required to pay additional taxes for the requested construction work. McGraw's resolve weakened, however: he was influenced in part by the opinion of C. W. Bean, the state superintendent of public instruction (whose research had concluded that McGraw's preferred model of a single central state normal school had not succeeded in other states). Perhaps as importantly, McGraw had been impressed by the survival and increasing enrollment numbers reported by the State Normal School at Cheney, which, as it had been achieved during years in temporary quarters with meager appropriations from the state, indicated the overall health of the institution. When the legislature passed a bill in March 1895 authorizing $60,000 for the construction of a new normal school building in Cheney, McGraw added his assent, and the construction was scheduled to begin.

Infighting between the citizens of Cheney and the normal school's administration, as well as disputes over the new construction, ultimately delayed the opening of the state's new building until 1897. The controversy brought a new newspaper to town, the Cheney Free Press, which was established "to support the interests of the Normal School administration."

== See also ==
- 1912 State Normal School at Cheney fire
