= Mary A. Monroe =

American educator (1860–1953)

Mary Ann Monroe (March 7, 1860 – September 11, 1953) was a prominent teacher and school administrator in Spokane, Washington, and an active figure in education across the state of Washington. She was the first woman to serve as president of the Washington Education Association and the first woman on the board of trustees at the State Normal School at Cheney. She ran unsuccessfully for the office of Washington Superintendent of Public Instruction in 1912, but was active in civic and state politics in the early 20th century.

== Early life and education ==
Monroe was born on March 7, 1860, in Newark, Ohio. She was born to mother Catherine Thyrer and father John Simpson. Her mother was from Germany, and her father, John Simpson, was from England. She had a sister.

Monroe received her education in a city normal school, and went to college at Denison University in Granville, Ohio, although she did not receive her degree from Denison. She completed her education degree at Ohio State University in Columbus, Ohio. In 1889, Monroe came to Spokane, Washington, and soon after she began employment at the Lincoln School (a public elementary school) as a teacher.

== Career ==
Monroe began teaching at the Lincoln School in Spokane in 1889. The school at that time held classes in the basement of a Unitarian Church. The school was soon relocated to its own building, which she later described in a letter to a friend as a brick building with four classrooms on what is now Cowley Street. The school's location made her work more challenging—as Monroe explained in her letters, the building had no running water initially, and the absence of graded streets in the early 1890s made access to the school difficult: "The teachers and students waded through snow, mud, and water in rubber boots." Monroe taught at the school for several years before being promoted to service as the building's principal, a job she held at the Lincoln School from 1893 until 1928. Among the major challenges she faced as principal was leading the school through rebuilding from catastrophic fires in 1903 and 1926.

Monroe was also active beyond the confines of the Lincoln School, working for public education. She was involved in the Washington Education Association from its earliest days, and is recorded as a presenter at the association's state conference in 1898. In January 1905, she was appointed to the library committee for the Spokane city schools by then school board president Warren W. Tolman.

=== 1912 campaign for State Superintendent ===
In 1912, Monroe ran as the Democratic nominee for state school superintendent, advocating a policy of "progression and modern ideas." Despite her identification as a Democrat, one newspaper remarked on the existence of "a non-partisan club of women" that organized specifically to assist with her campaign, which included both Progressive and Republican women in the club's leadership. Monroe's platform aimed to make education more directly related to the everyday lives of students. Rural Washington schools, in Monroe's view, needed to focus on agriculture and domestic science for the future housewife, with "a closer relation between the farm and the school." For urban students, Monroe favored manual training departments, and school and home gardens. For all students, regardless of location, she advocated for citizenship education.

In the general election, Monroe placed third statewide with 72,916 votes—a relatively close loss in a three-way race against C.E. Beach, the Progressive nominee, who received 86,396 votes, and the winner, Republican nominee Josephine Corliss Preston, who received 96,756 votes.

=== Trustee ===
On April 26, 1913, the Colville Examiner published appointments made by Governor Ernest Lister. The article announced Monroe as a "trustee [for the] Cheney normal school." She was the first woman to serve on the normal school's board of trustees.

When the normal school's main building was rebuilt following the 1912 fire, Monroe as chair of the board of trustees gave the opening address at the dedication of the new building (now Showalter Hall) on May 22, 1915. On February 4, 1916, Monroe was present at the dedication of another new building—the school's first dormitory—when it was named Monroe Hall in her honor. She was the guest of honor on the occasion, and was invited to kindle the first fire in the hall's main fireplace: she made some brief remarks about "the various ways in which a woman's residence hall could have a salutary influence on girls coming from many different environments." She fulfilled the same office on July 9, 1920, kindling the first fire at the campus's second dormitory, Senior Hall: she then remarked "It is the wish of the friends of the girls of Senior Hall that the fireplace may scatter its light, radiate its heat, and bring good cheer to future occupants of this beautiful home." Another of her public duties was handing diplomas to graduates at the commencement ceremony.

In addition to her duties as a trustee, Monroe visited with the students of the Normal School. In June 1918, she spent the weekend as a guest in Monroe Hall. Monroe was also a regular guest at senior class dinners. In 1924, all the trustees, including Monroe, were honored with a dinner. While visiting Ohio in the summer of 1921, Monroe purchased two vases to decorate Monroe Hall.

=== Political activism ===
Monroe was active in public service and civic engagement throughout her life. She was the first woman teacher in Spokane to testify in court regarding the enforcement of the city's truancy law. In 1913, Monroe was elected as the incoming president of the Washington Education Association (WEA), while still remaining a school principal in the Spokane Public Schools; she was the first woman president of the WEA, and only the second woman in the United States to serve as president of a state educational association.

Monroe remained active in Democratic party politics after her 1912 run for State Superintendent. She was one of four women named as delegates to the 1916 Democratic National Convention that re-nominated Woodrow Wilson (Monroe was an at-large delegate). In 1920, Monroe was appointed to a "Democratic Platform Committee" for the Washington State Democratic Party, which was chaired by Preston M. Troy.

Later in life, Monroe served as an officer in the Episcopal Diocese of Spokane's Women's Auxiliary: she is listed as the president of that organization in 1931. She also served on Spokane's municipal parks board, chairing the recreation committee at one point: in that capacity, she assisted with the training of teachers facilitated by the Works Progress Administration in 1936.

== Personal life ==
Reports vary as to when Monroe married William Allison Monroe: in her obituary, it claims they were married in 1884, whereas William Allison Monroe's obituary claims they were married in 1886. The couple had no children. In 1889, they moved from Newark, Ohio, to Seattle, Washington, and shortly after the Great Fire on August 4, 1889, they moved to Spokane. William A. Monroe was a well-known engineer and accountant. Soon after they came to Spokane, he became a deputy city auditor, working with Theodore Reed. After about a decade and a half, he joined Winter, Parsons & Boomer, railway contractors, quickly becoming a manager of that company, which built many railways, dams, and other projects throughout the western United States. He died of a stroke at the age of 79, on March 13, 1940, at Sacred Heart Hospital in Spokane.

According to the Spokane Press, Monroe, when she was principal of the Lincoln School, woke up to a burglar in her home one evening. She screamed and frightened the burglar, who the Press noted was "probably more scared than she [was]": the police were called and nothing was reported stolen.

Monroe died at the age of 93 on September 11, 1953, at the Jane O'Brien Sanitarium in Spokane, from chronic myocardial degeneration. She is buried at Greenwood Memorial Terrace in Spokane.
