= Josephine Corliss Preston =

American educator and politician (1873–1958)

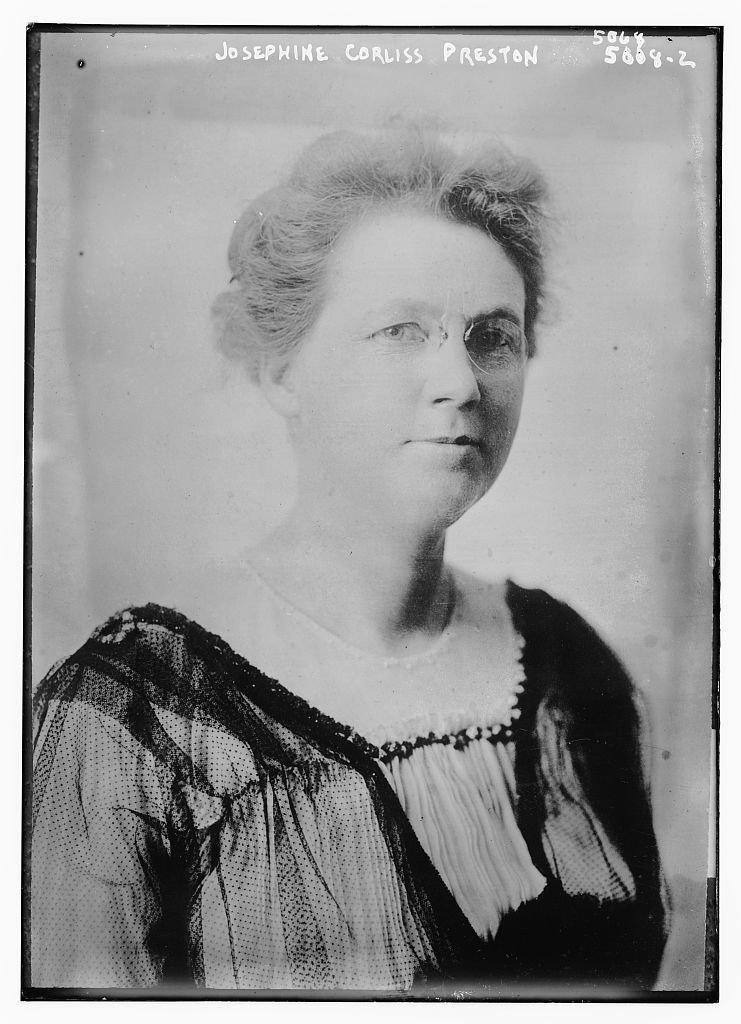
- Preston, c. 1915.

5th Washington Superintendent of Public Instruction
- In office January 15, 1913 – January 16, 1929
- Governor: Ernest Lister; Louis F. Hart; Roland H. Hartley
- Preceded by: Henry B. Dewey
- Succeeded by: Pearl Anderson Wanamaker

Personal details
- Born: Josephine Corliss; May 26, 1873 Fergus Falls, Minnesota, US
- Died: December 10, 1958 (aged 85) Renton, Washington, US
- Party: Republican
- Spouse: Herbert P. Preston

Josephine Corliss Preston (May 26, 1873 – December 10, 1958) was an American educator and politician who was the first woman elected to state office in Washington. She served as the fifth Washington State Superintendent of Public Instruction from 1913 to 1929.

== Early life ==
Josephine was born on May 26, 1873, in Fergus Falls, Minnesota. She was the daughter of John Wesley Corliss (1837–1889) and Josephine (nee Kinney) Corliss (1852–1933). Her older sister, Myrtia Permelia Corliss, was the wife of Frank Lewis Phelps. Her father served in Company E and Company K of the 5th Michigan Volunteer Infantry Regiment during the U.S. Civil War and fought in the Battle of Gettysburg.

Her paternal grandparents were Timothy Emerson Corliss and Elvira (nee Hutchins) Corliss.

She received her education at country schools in Minnesota and began teaching in Otter Tail County, Minnesota, at the age of fourteen. From 1891 to 1892, she attended the preparatory academy of Carleton College in Northfield, Minnesota.

== Career ==
In 1900, she moved west with her widowed mother, sister and brother and began teaching at the Maple Valley School before becoming the county superintendent of schools in Walla Walla, Washington.

In 1911, fellow Republican governor Marion Hay appointed her to the Washington State Board of Education. She was nominated as State Superintendent of Schools in 1912, and was elected to succeed Henry B. Dewey as the Washington State Superintendent of Public Instruction, beating Mary A. Monroe who was an elementary school principal in the Spokane Public Schools. Preston was reelected several times and served in Olympia, Washington, until 1928, when she lost the primary to Noah D. Showalter, President of Washington State Normal School at Cheney, who was defeated by Pearl Anderson Wanamaker in the general election.

She was a life member of and a past president of the National Education Association.

After her retirement, she lived for several years in the Burton neighborhood of Vashon Island, Washington.

== Personal life ==
Josephine was briefly married, and divorced, from Herbert P. Preston (1873–1955). While Superintendent, she lived 1502 Columbia St SW, in what is referred to today as the Josephine Corliss Preston House.

Corliss died December 10, 1958, in Renton, Washington. After a funeral service at the Burton Community Church, she was buried at the Mountain View Memorial Park in Tacoma, Washington.

== Published works ==
- Woman and Preparedness (1917)
