= Chauncey B. Seaton =

American architect

- Born: March 14, 1848; Bucyrus, Ohio, U.S.
- Died: December 2, 1896 (aged 48)
- Occupation: Architect
- Notable work: Review Building

Chauncey B. Seaton (March 14, 1848 – December 2, 1896) was an architect in the United States. He was born near Bucyrus, Ohio, studied at Wooster University and then at a technical school in Chicago.

He worked as an architect in Selma, Alabama, before returning to Chicago and working in Saint Paul, Minnesota. He ventured out to what was then known as Spokane Falls after the Great Spokane Fire and designed the Spokesman-Review building in Spokane, Washington, in 1890. Some sources credit him with the Northwest Industrial Exposition Building constructed in 1890, but others credit Richard H. Martin, Jr.

C. Ferris White worked with him.

== Spokane-Review building ==
After the Spokane Fire of 1889, Chauncey B. Seaton designed the Spokane-Review building with an irregular shape to fit the shape of the lot. He left Spokane before the Spokesman-Review building was completed. It housed both the Spokesman-Review and the Spokane Daily Chronicle, both owned by Cowles of the Cowles Company, until the Daily Chronicle Building was completed next door in 1928.

He died December 2, 1896, after a long period of illness.

== Work ==
- Spokane Falls Review building (The Spokesman-Review building)
- Northwest Industrial Exposition building (burned)
- State Normal School at Cheney (destroyed in the 1891 State Normal School at Cheney fire)
- Pioneer block of Boise
- H. B. Wadsworth residence
- H. M. Stephens residence
- Rufus Merriam residence
- W R. Orndorff residence
- J. H. Vagin residence
- Six cottages for E. L. Shannon
- McQuillan Block in St. Paul, Minnesota
