= Associated Students of Eastern Washington University =

Student government organization

The Associated Students of Eastern Washington University (ASEWU) is the student government for the undergraduate and graduate student body at Eastern Washington University (EWU). The organization was first established in what was then the State Normal School at Cheney when its constitution was approved for the 1919–1920 academic year, and its initial class of officers were elected. ASEWU has played an important role in the life and landscape of EWU, including raising funds for multiple student union building projects over the course of the 20th and early 21st centuries.

== The creation of ASEWU ==
In 1919, the Associated Students organized to advance the "best interests of the school and promoting all school activities," and to participate in decisions and "management of the school as it affects the student body."

The first election occurred in the fall quarter of 1919. The following officers were elected: George Speck, President; George Buchanan, Vice President; Beatrice Rolfe, Secretary; Chairman Executive Committee, Jesse West; Chairman Program Committee, Florence Lair; Chairman Entertainment Committee, Myra Booth.

In her history of Eastern Washington State College (now Eastern Washington University), Cecil Dryden attributes the formation of the Associated Students to the efforts of a student attending the school in 1919–1920, who she identifies only as "G.S.". It is safe to assume that "G.S." is Speck, the first president that was elected.

In March 1920, the student body voted to adopt a new constitution, which was a "careful working over" of the former draft. The constitution was read in its entirety to the Associated Students, and the overwhelming majority voted to adopt the new draft.

The new draft of the student body constitution went into effect after the approval of faculty in March 1924. The first known printed text of the constitution can be found in an issue of the State Normal School Journal that was published on March 14, 1924. It outlines the frequency of meetings for the Associated Students, the organization of the student government, duties of the Associated Students, and election guidelines.

== Contributions to EWU's campus in the 20th century ==
The Associated Students have been involved in the construction and remodeling of EWU's student union buildings as early as 1954 when plans were being considered for the building that would become Isle Hall. The new student union building was intended to replace Ratcliffe House which purportedly became too small for increasing enrollment. The Associated Student Body proposed a $5 quarterly fee to finance construction bonds to build a new student union building. Features planned included a bookstore, sundries, cafeteria, banquet ballroom, billiard room, ping pong room, faculty room, meeting room, and student body offices. In 2015 the ASEWU's special election for the construction of a new student union building resulted in 1,052 votes in favor, and 983 votes opposed.

In 1972 the leader of the ASEWU Hefner started a new recruitment program were the ASEWU would hold meeting in different areas of the state to try to attract more students to eastern. Also developing a speech credit program for students that returned to their high schools to give a speech about Eastern.

In 1919, though popular, the Associated Students were involved in the abolishing of football after it was determined that the students who turned out were involved in too many other activities and would not be able to play on top of everything else. (State Normal School Journal, Vol. 4, October 23, 1919).

ASEWU proposals to support childcare start as early as 1981, with campaign pledges by presidential candidates to make childcare funding a priority. By Fall of 1981, a contract between EWU and the Cheney Day Care Center was signed to provide financial support from ASEWU. In 1984, ASEWU started a voucher system for students wishing to use subsidized day care. When ASEWU voted to end the vouchers in 1996, the Washington State Attorney General advised that ASEWU was contractually obligated to provide the day care subsidy.

== Recent impacts on EWU's campus ==
ASEWU proposed a campus tobacco ban as early as 2010.

== Structure of ASEWU ==
The 1924 Associated Students constitution identified a three-person executive consisting of a president, vice-president, and secretary. It also identified five committees: the Finance Committee, the Social Committee, the Entertainment Committee, the Men's Athletic Committee, and the Women's Athletic Committee. The chairpeople of these committee along with the executives and faculty committee advisors comprised the advisory board, whose responsibility is to approve the budget, to vote on the charter of new student groups, and provide input on changes to school policy.

== Notable ASEWU officers and elections ==
The earliest record of an elected ASEWU officer is in the State Normal School Journal on October 9, 1919. That issue names George Speck of Spokane as the winner of the office of President in the quarterly election (along with George Buchanan of Cheney as Vice president, and Beatrice Rolfe of Spokane as Secretary). Despite the campus student population being predominantly female in that era, men win the majority of elected offices in quarterly elections from the beginning: the first woman to be elected president of what was then called "the students' association" was Grace Dicus of Garfield, who wins the Presidency in October 1921 "by a plurality of 40 votes" over Jesse West of Rosalia (who had won the position of chairman of the executive committee in that first election in October 1919).

That gender dynamic became a topic of conversation on campus in the December 1922 quarterly election, in which the school's female students formed a coordinated bloc to see women elected into office. Mrs. Florence Stowe of Coeur d'Alene was elected president "by a four to one majority" over her male opponent, Ray Hubbard of Spangle. This election result was reported in the school newspaper in an article beginning simply "The women won." That piece went on to describe the course of the campaign, in which "certain women, who preached the gospel of feminine solidarity," persuaded all of Stowe's female opponents to withdraw their candidacies, since "it was claimed by the feminine campaign spellbinders that the men of the school had purposely promoted the candidacies of several women in order to split the women's vote." Ultimately, women won every office in that quarter's election: Stowe was joined in victory by Janett Craig as Vice President, Jessie Duff as Secretary-treasurer, and Clara Peterson as Chairman of the Program Committee.
