= Northwest Industrial Exposition =

Exposition held in Spokane, Washington

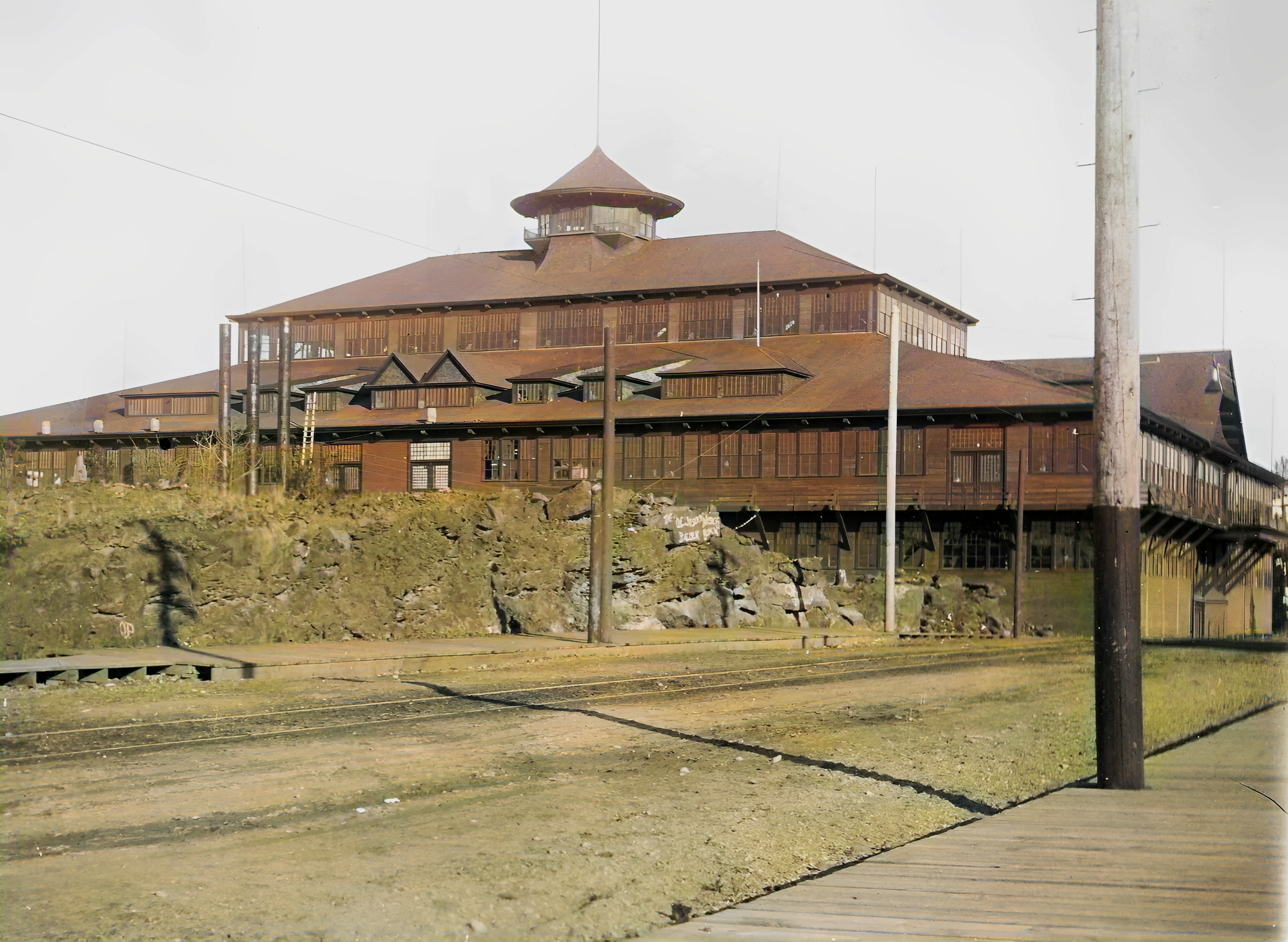
Northwestern Industrial Exposition 1890 Building

The Northwestern Industrial Exposition was held in Spokane, Washington (then known as Spokane Falls) from October 1, 1890 to November 3, 1890. It followed the August 4, 1889 fire that burned much of downtown. Chauncey B. Seaton designed the exposition hall. Artworks displayed included works by Frederic Remington. The wooden exposition building burned on September 11, 1893.

== History ==
Washington became a state November and 11, 1889. The exposition hall was built at Sprague Avenue and Riverside Avenue. The exposition touted conquering nature. Light installations featured at the exposition.

People profiled in the exposition brochure include F. Lewis Clark, Horace L. Cutter, Kirtland K. Cutter, lawyer and writer Chester Glass, businessman and state legislator B. C. Van Houten, D. M. Drumheller, David B. Jenkins, and Dr. C. S. Penfield.

== See also ==
- Lewis and Clark Centennial Exposition, held in Portland, Oregon in 1905
- List of world's fairs
