= Washingtonpost.Newsweek Interactive =

American online news subsidiary (1993–2010)

Washingtonpost.Newsweek Interactive was an online subsidiary of The Washington Post Company, headquartered in Arlington, Virginia, United States. WPNI operated washingtonpost.com, the website of the Washington Post, as well as the Web sites Newsweek.com, Slate, Foreign Policy Magazine, Budget Travel Online, Sprig, LoudonExtra.com, The Root and TheBigMoney. WPNI was formed in November 1993 under the name Digital Ink.

In 2009, Newsweek.com and Budget Travel Online were transferred to Newsweek (with Budget Travel magazine and Web site subsequently sold by Newsweek), and WPNI began doing business by the name Washington Post Digital. In 2010, WPNI ceased, and all employees transferred to The Washington Post or The Slate Group.

== Awards ==
In 2006, the WPNI Congressional Votes Database project won a $1000 Award of Distinction in the Knight-Batten Awards for Innovations in Journalism.

In 2005, WPNI's Slate Magazine won two EPpys for "Best Internet News Service over 1 million monthly visitors" and for "Best Internet Entertainment Service over 1 million monthly visitors." Washingtonpost.com also won an EPpy for "Best Overall Design of an Internet Service over 1 million monthly visitors."

== New talent ==
The hiring of "converged-media visionary" Rob Curley brought a prominent innovator in the field of online journalism to the company. Curley's first major project at WPNI was onBeing, "a presentation of observations, lessons and tales offered by everyday people from every walk of life." The project had several groundbreaking features, which are detailed in its press-release. However, Curley left shortly thereafter, in 2008, for the Las Vegas Sun, saying on his Web site that he "probably wasn't the best fit with the organization."
