= The Spokesman-Review =

Broadsheet newspaper in Washington, U.S.

Coordinates: 47.6578°N 117.4262°W

- Type: Daily newspaper
- Format: Broadsheet
- Owner: Cowles Company
- Publisher: William Stacey Cowles
- Editor: Rob Curley (suspended)
- Founded: June 29, 1894; 132 years ago in Spokane, Washington, U.S. (merger)
- Language: English
- Headquarters: 999 W. Riverside Ave. Spokane, Washington
- Country: United States
- Circulation: 10,000 Digital Subscribers; 56,629 (as of 2022)
- ISSN: 2993-1274
- OCLC number: 11102529
- Website: spokesman.com

The Spokesman-Review is a daily broadsheet newspaper based in Spokane, Washington, the city's sole remaining daily publication. It has the third-highest readership among daily newspapers in the state, with most of its readership base in eastern Washington and northern Idaho.

== History ==
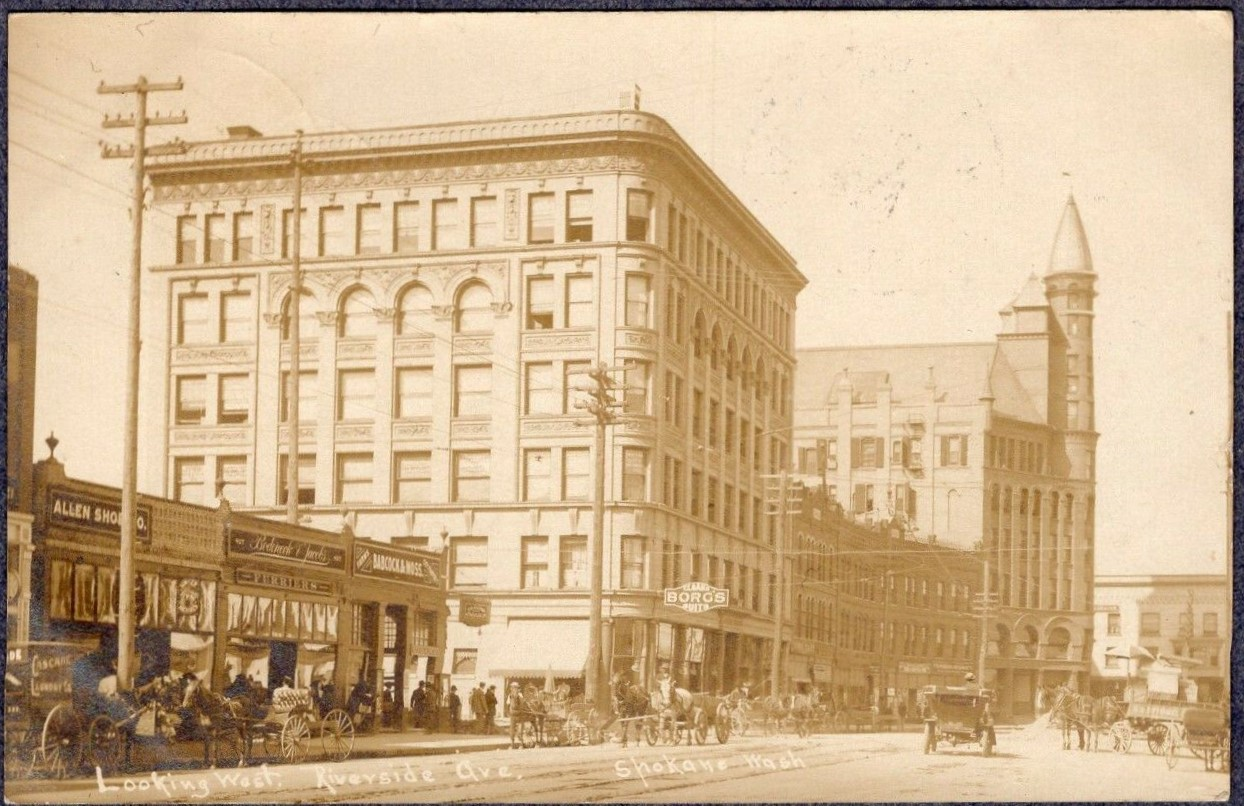
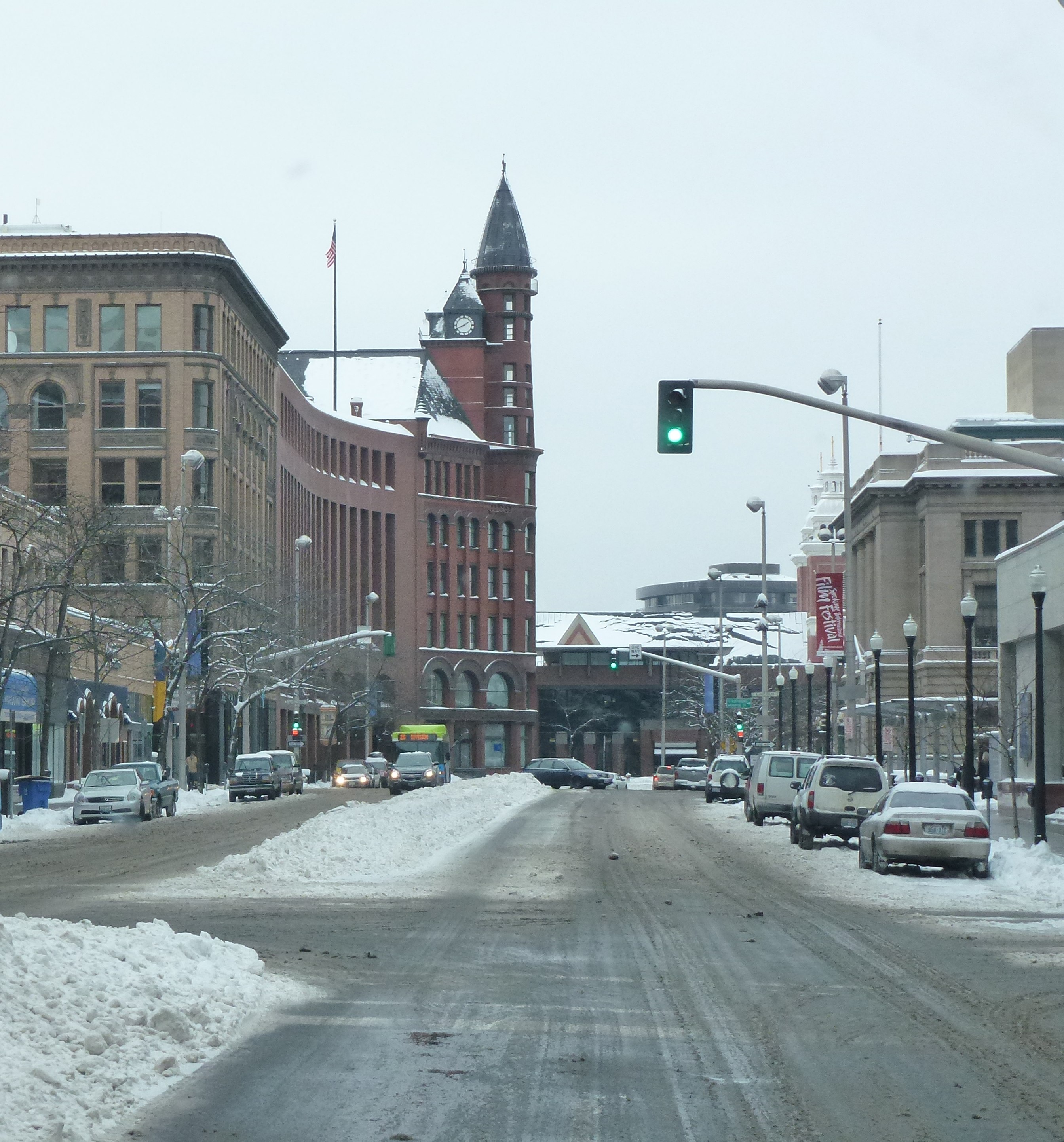
The Review Building and tower was designed by Chauncey B. Seaton to make use of the unusually shaped plot and make it prominent in the center of Riverside Avenue. Seen here in 1907 and 2012.

The Spokesman-Review was formed from the merger of the Spokane Falls Review (1883–1894) and the Spokesman (1890–1893) in 1893 and first published under the present name on June 29, 1894. The Spokane Falls Review was a joint venture between local businessman, A.M. Cannon and Henry Pittock and Harvey W. Scott of The Oregonian. The Spokesman-Review later absorbed its competing sister publication, the afternoon Spokane Daily Chronicle. Long co-owned, the two combined their sports departments in late 1981 and news staffs in early 1983. The middle name "Daily" was dropped in January 1982, and its final edition was printed 34 years ago on Friday, July 31, 1992.

The newspaper formerly published three editions, a metro edition covering Spokane and the outlying areas, a Spokane Valley edition and an Idaho edition covering northern Idaho. After a large downsizing of the newsroom staff in November 2007, the paper moved to a single zoned edition emphasizing localized "Voices" sections staffed primarily by non-union employees. The "Voices" section still caters to the three original editions, publishing a Valley "Voices", a North Spokane "Voices" and a South Spokane "Voices".

Owner of both papers since 1897, W.H. Cowles set the Chronicle on a course to be independent and The Spokesman-Review to support Republican Party causes. Time magazine related the papers' success gaining lowered rates for freight carried to the Northwest and an improved park system and that helped the region. Increasing its reputation for comprehensive local news and by opposing "gambling, liquor and prostitution," The Spokesman-Review gained popularity. The paper's opposition to building the Grand Coulee Dam was not quite so universally applauded, and when it opposed the New Deal and the Fair Deal, it so disturbed President Harry Truman that during a visit in 1948 he declared The Spokesman-Review to be one of the "two worst" newspapers in the nation (Chicago Tribune, the other). The Scripps League's Press closed in 1939, making Cowles the only newspaper publisher in Spokane. Cowles created four weeklies, the Idaho Farmer, Washington Farmer, Oregon Farmer, and Utah Farmer. Cowles died in 1946. When William H. Cowles Jr. succeeded his father as publisher, James Bracken received much more news and editorial control as managing editor.

The Spokesman-Review has been described as moderate-to-liberal, especially in issues around hate groups in the region. In 1997, three extreme-right militants were tried and eventually convicted of bombing the Spokane Valley office of The Spokesman-Review as well as an abortion clinic (see Citizens Rule Book).

The Spokesman-Review is also one of the few remaining family-owned newspapers in the United States. It is owned by Cowles Company, which also owns KHQ-TV/Spokane and The KHQ Television Group. While the newspaper wins awards, it also draws opposition from local critics and activists who suspect the Cowles family of using its alleged vast local media influence to sway public opinion. In particular, a (1997–2004) issue regarding a public-private partnership wherein the Cowles family may have profited, some claim, up to $20 million. This is referred to as the "River Park Square Parking Garage" issue. The newspaper underwent an independent review by the Washington News Council regarding its River Park Square coverage and was found to be at fault for its news bias.

In 2004, Spokane mayor James E. West became the target of a sting operation conducted by The Spokesman-Review. Some journalists and academics criticized the paper for what they saw as a form of entrapment. West was later cleared of criminal charges by the FBI but not before the mayor lost a recall vote by the citizens of Spokane in December 2005; the following summer, West died of cancer.

According to the Audit Bureau of Circulations, as reported in the Puget Sound Business Journal on April 29, 2010, the newspaper's average Sunday circulation totaled 95,939 and weekly circulation averaged 76,291. That represented a year-over-year decrease of about 10.5 percent; a trend widely reflected during the same year in newspapers throughout Washington state. With the demise of the print edition of the Seattle Post-Intelligencer, The Spokesman-Review is the state's third-largest paper, after the Seattle Times and The News-Tribune of Tacoma.

A 2017 Rotary Club article stated that under editor Rob Curley, hired in 2016, circulation increased from 68,000 to 82,000 in one year.

In April 2020, the paper ceased printing its Saturday edition. In 2025, the Cowles family announced it will donate The Spokesman-Review to the nonprofit Comma Community Journalism Laboratory. A few months later Hagadone Media Group of Coeur d’Alene announced it will print The Spokesman-Review after the paper's previous in-house printer Northwest Offset Printing announced it was ceasing operations.

In August 2026, editor Rob Curley was suspended after a series of complaints from other employees, including allegations of inappropriate comments and editorial interference to prevent stories critical of Comma donors from being published.
