= The Slate Group =

American online publishing entity

The Slate Group, legally The Slate Group, LLC, is an American online publishing entity established in June 2008 by Graham Holdings Company. Among the publications overseen by The Slate Group are Slate and ForeignPolicy.com.

The creation of The Slate Group was announced by Donald Graham, the chairman and CEO of The Washington Post Company, in a press release on June 4, 2008. Its mission was stated as developing and managing a family of web-only magazines. The release also announced that Slate Group was expected to work closely with Washingtonpost.Newsweek Interactive in the areas of advertising sales, technology and marketing services.

In 2014, The Slate Group had around 121 employees and reported more than 25 million unique visitors and more than 120 million page views per month on average.

Through a share in the French company E2J2 SAS and other support, The Slate Group is involved in the French-language websites Slate.fr and Slate Afrique. The Root, an online magazine focusing on African American culture, used to be held by The Slate Group until Graham Holdings sold it to Univision Communications in 2015.
