= W. J. Sutton =

American politician

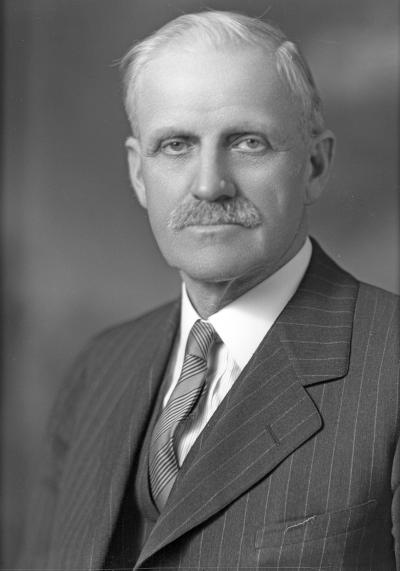
- Sutton in 1931

President pro tempore of the Washington Senate
- In office January 12, 1931 – January 9, 1933
- Preceded by: Fred W. Hastings
- Succeeded by: Walter G. Ronald

Member of the Washington Senate from the 5th district
- In office January 10, 1921 – January 9, 1933
- Preceded by: E. Ben Johnson
- Succeeded by: Kebel Murphy
- In office January 13, 1913 – January 8, 1917
- Preceded by: Ellsworth C. Whitney
- Succeeded by: E. Ben Johnson

Personal details
- Born: William James Sutton; September 29, 1865 Lapeer County, Michigan, U.S.
- Died: December 22, 1940 (aged 75) Cheney, Washington, U.S.
- Party: Republican
- Spouse(s): Nellie (nee Hutchinson) m.1897–1921, her death

William James Sutton (September 29, 1865 – December 22, 1940) was an American politician in the state of Washington. He served in the Washington State Senate from 1913 to 1917 and 1921 to 1933. From 1931 to 1933, he was president pro tempore of the Senate.

== Life ==
Sutton was born in Lapeer County, Michigan on September 29, 1865, and graduated from the Michigan State Normal School in Fenton in 1886. After his graduation, he moved to Cheney, Washington where he was instrumental in setting up the Cheney School District in 1887 as well as the State Normal School at Cheney in 1889. Sutton served as the first vice-principal of the Normal School, and was then the principal starting in January 1892. The Normal School, which started as the Benjamin P. Cheney Academy in 1882, served as public school for the city of Cheney until the establishment of the Public School in 1887. In 1889, with the statehood of Washington, the academy was offered to the State of Washington as the State Normal School.

After resigning from the State Normal School in February 1897, he married Nellie Hutchinson, the former principal of the Training School at the Normal School and he purchased a farm on the western edge of town.

== Political career ==
Sutton was first elected to the Washington State Senate in 1913, where he pushed through an appropriation of $300,000 to the Normal School over the veto of Governor Ernest Lister. The appropriation was used to replace the administration building lost in the 1912 fire with what would become the prominent Showalter Hall on the campus of Eastern Washington University. Other accomplishments as a politician include saving the State College from being demoted to a trade school. After retiring from the Senate, he continued to farm and act as a prominent citizen of Cheney until his death in December 1940.

Sutton was the Republican candidate for governor in 1916.

== Legacy ==
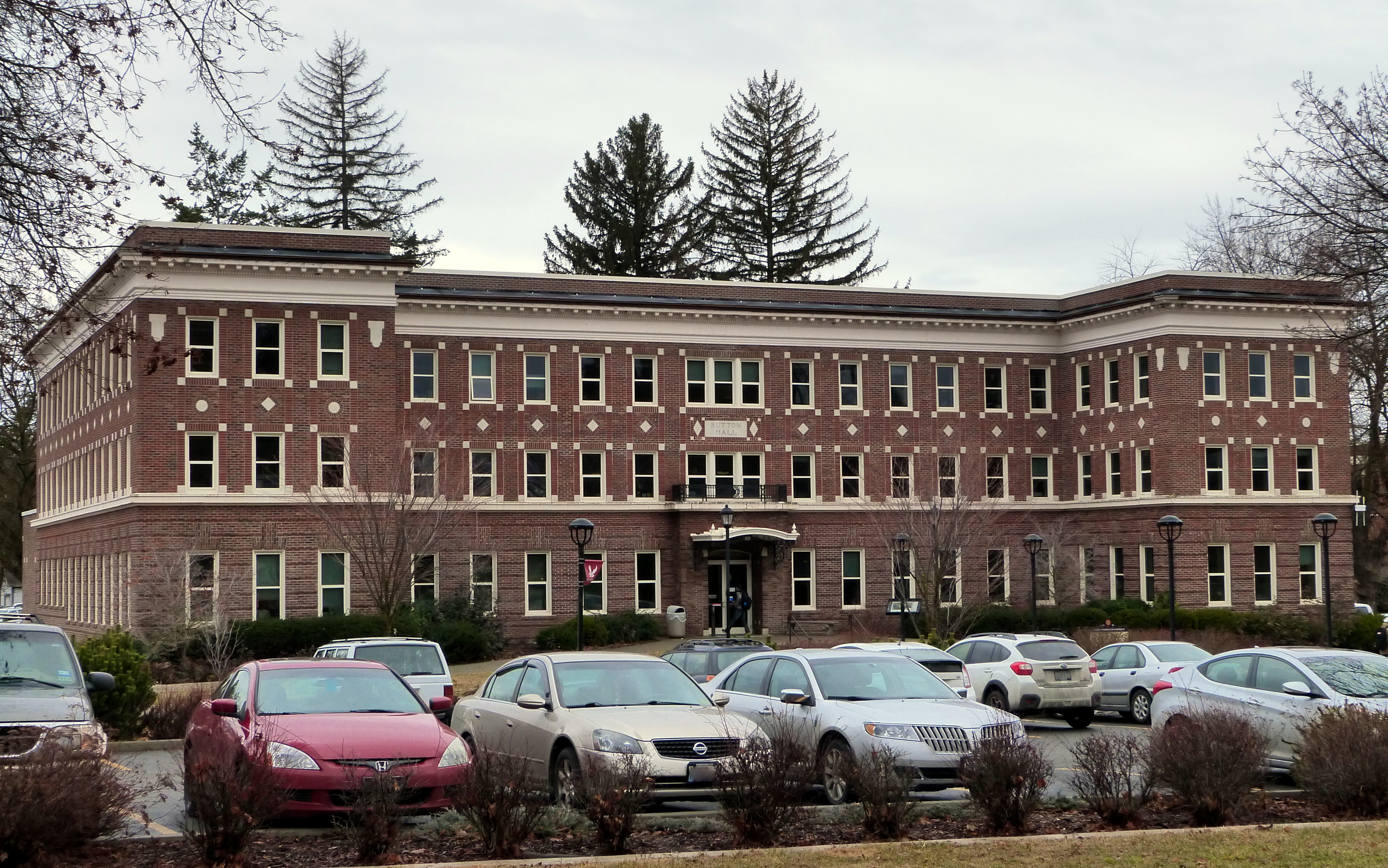
Sutton Hall

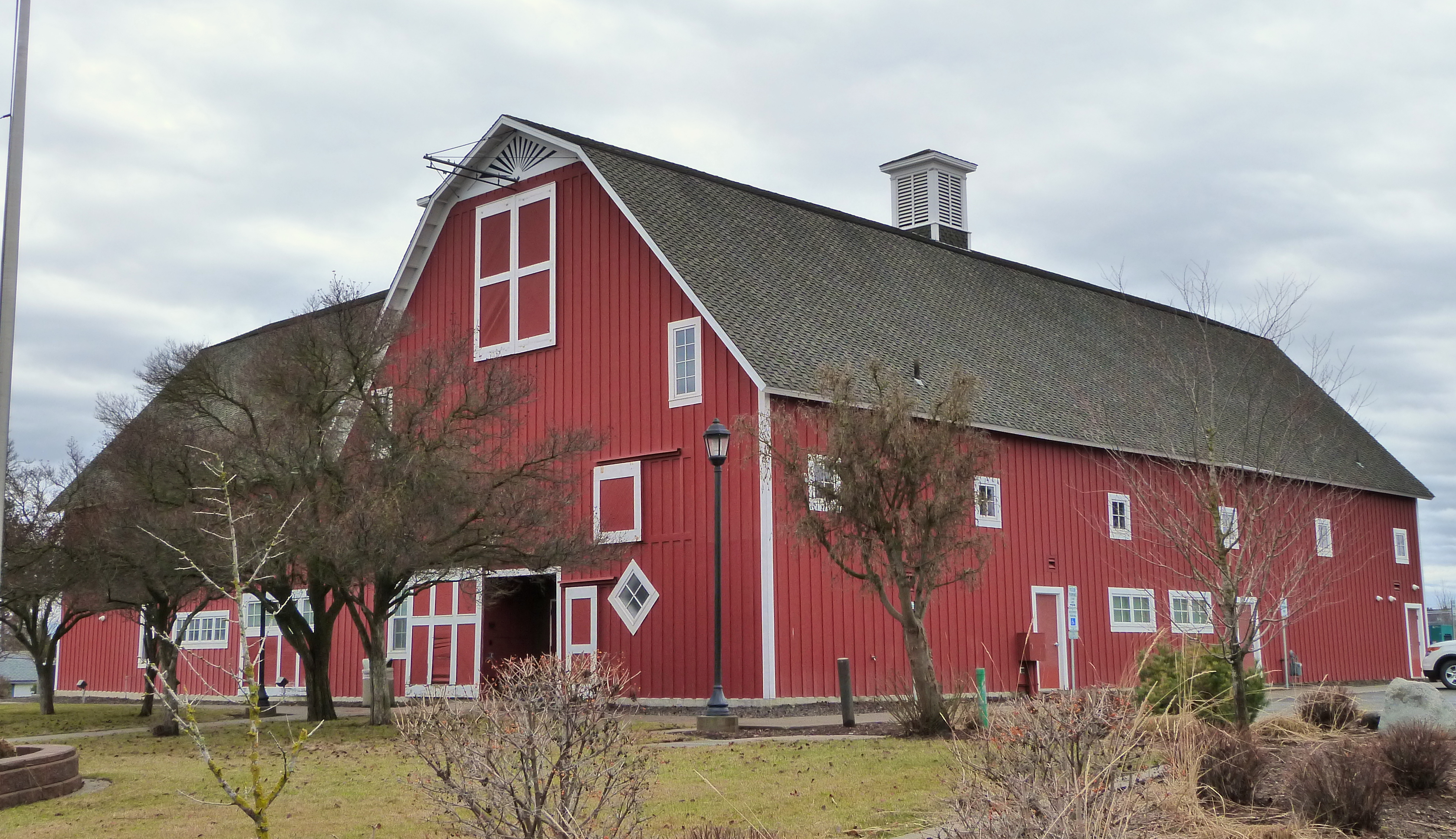
Red Barn (Sutton Barn)

Buildings associated with Sutton in Cheney

Several buildings and a park in Cheney are named for or traced back to Sutton, including:

- Sutton Hall (1923), originally constructed as a men's dormitory and now one of the contributing structures to the NRHP-listed EWU Historic District. It was designed by the prominent architect Julius Zittel.
- Red Barn (1884), originally called Sutton Barn. This was part of the Sutton farmstead where Sutton raised horses together with his wife Nellie Hutchinson. The barn had originally been built by William Bigham in 1884 for Nellie's father. Sutton purchased the farm in 1891 or 1892, and the farm site was later purchased by Eastern Washington University in 1969.
- Sutton Park
