= Great Seattle Fire =

1889 fire which destroyed downtown Seattle, Washington, US

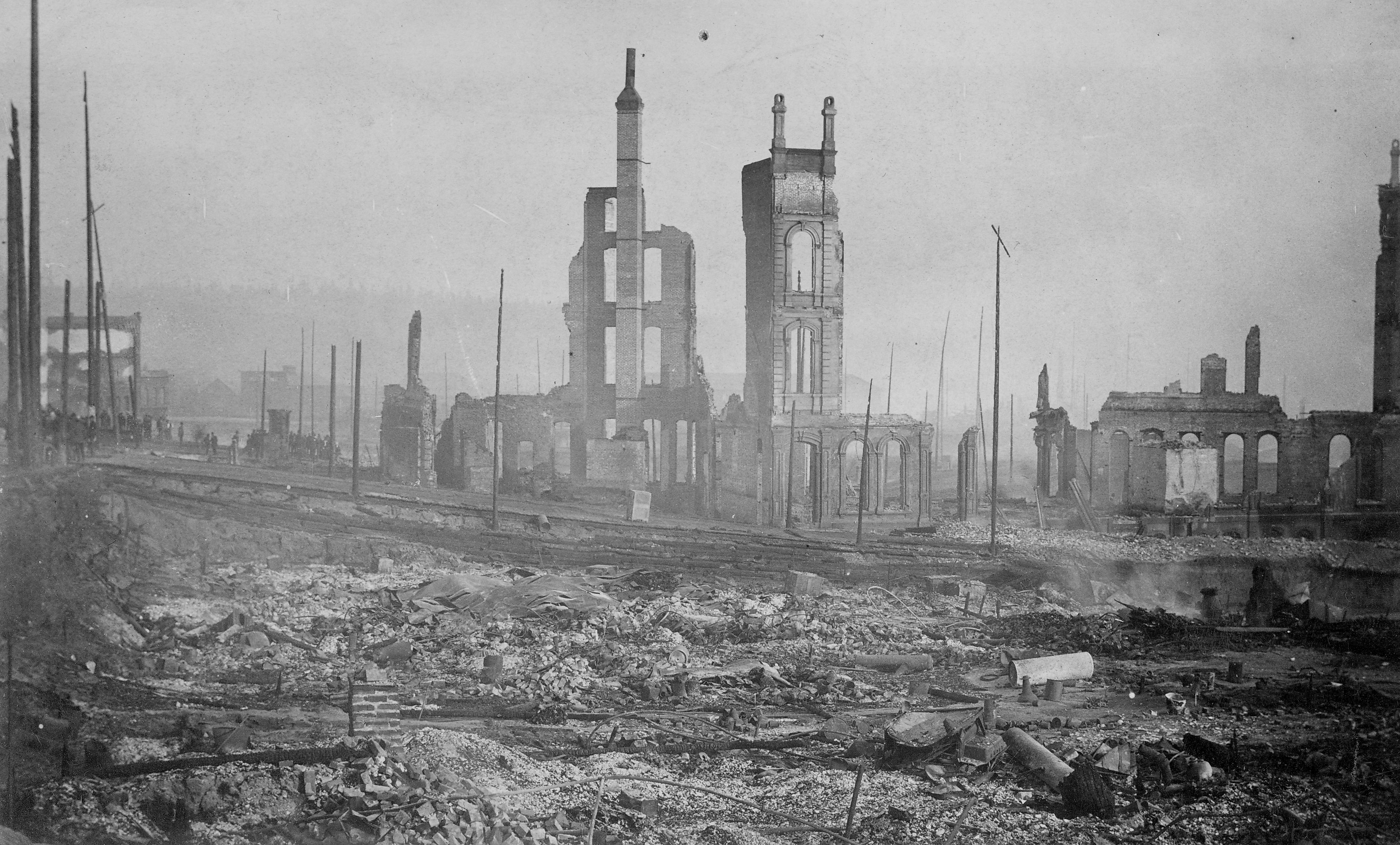
- Aftermath of the fire, vicinity of Pioneer Square
- Date: June 6–7, 1889; 2:45 p.m. – 3:00 a.m.
- Location: Seattle, Washington Territory
- Coordinates: 47°36′16″N 122°20′11″W

Impacts
- Deaths: 1
- Structures lost: 29 city blocks
- Cost: $20 million ($717 million in 2025 dollars)

Ignition
- Cause: Overheated glue pot

The Great Seattle Fire was a fire that destroyed the entire central business district of Seattle, Washington, on June 6, 1889. The conflagration lasted for less than a day, burning through the afternoon and into the night, during the same summer as the Great Spokane Fire and the Great Ellensburg Fire. Seattle quickly rebuilt using brick buildings that sat 20 feet (6.1 m) above the original street level. Its population swelled during reconstruction, becoming the largest city in the newly admitted state of Washington.

== Early Seattle ==
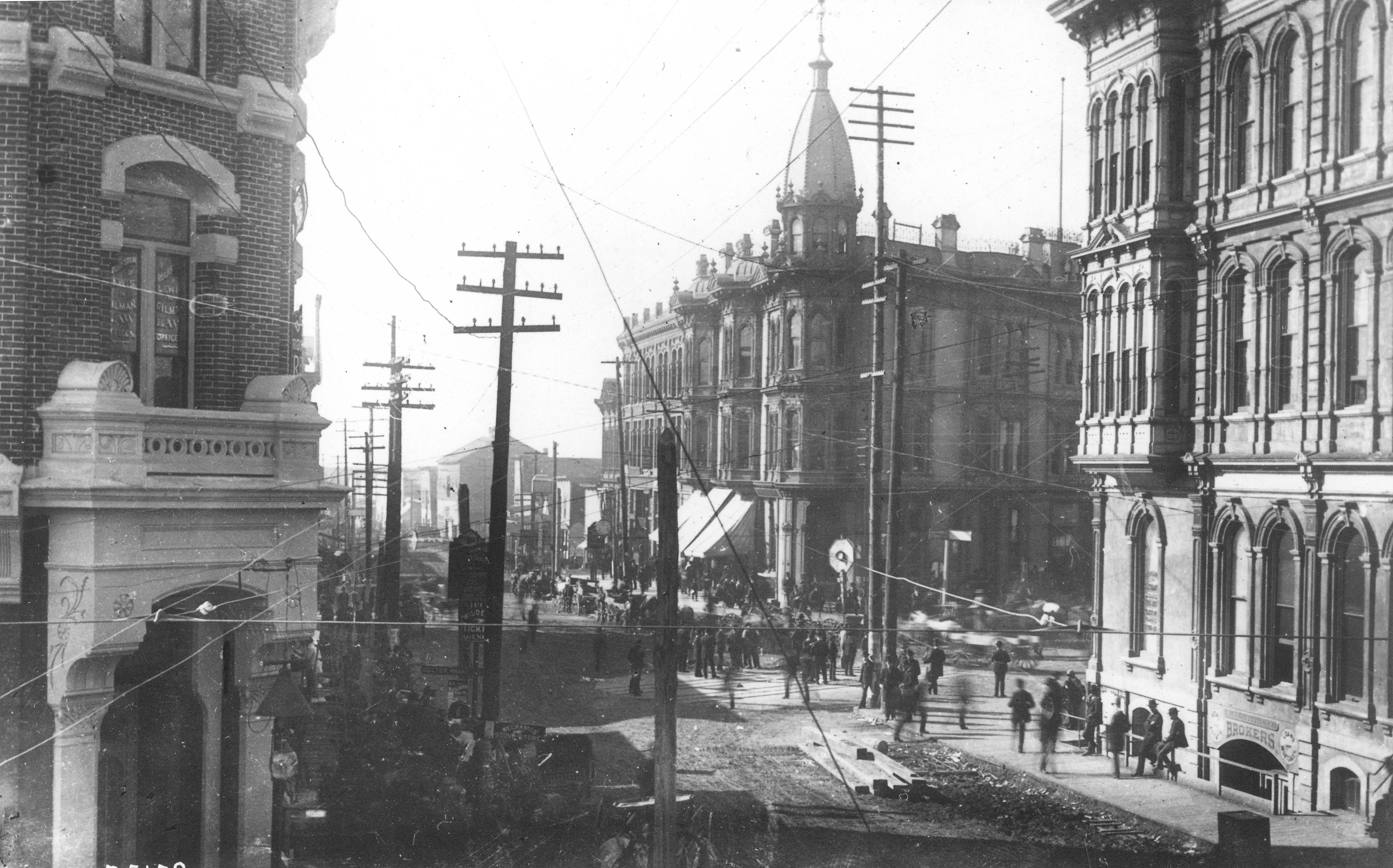
Looking west on Mill Street (today's Yesler Way) across Front Street (today's First Avenue) June 5, 1889, one day before this district burned. Korn block on left; Yesler-Leary Building, center; Occidental Hotel, right.

In the fall of 1851, the Denny Party arrived at Alki Point in what is now the state of Washington. After spending a miserable winter on the western shores of Elliott Bay, the party relocated to the eastern shores and established the settlement that eventually became Seattle.

Early Seattle was dominated by the logging industry. The combination of a safe bay and an abundance of coniferous trees made Seattle the perfect location for shipping lumber to California. In 1852, Henry Yesler began construction of the first steam-powered mill in the Pacific Northwest. Because of the easy access to lumber, nearly every building was constructed of the affordable but combustible timber. Additionally, because the area was at or below sea level, the fledgling town was a frequent victim of massive floods, requiring buildings to be built on wooden stilts. The town also used hollowed out scrap logs propped up on wooden braces as sewer and water pipes, increasing the combustible loading.

== Events of the fire ==
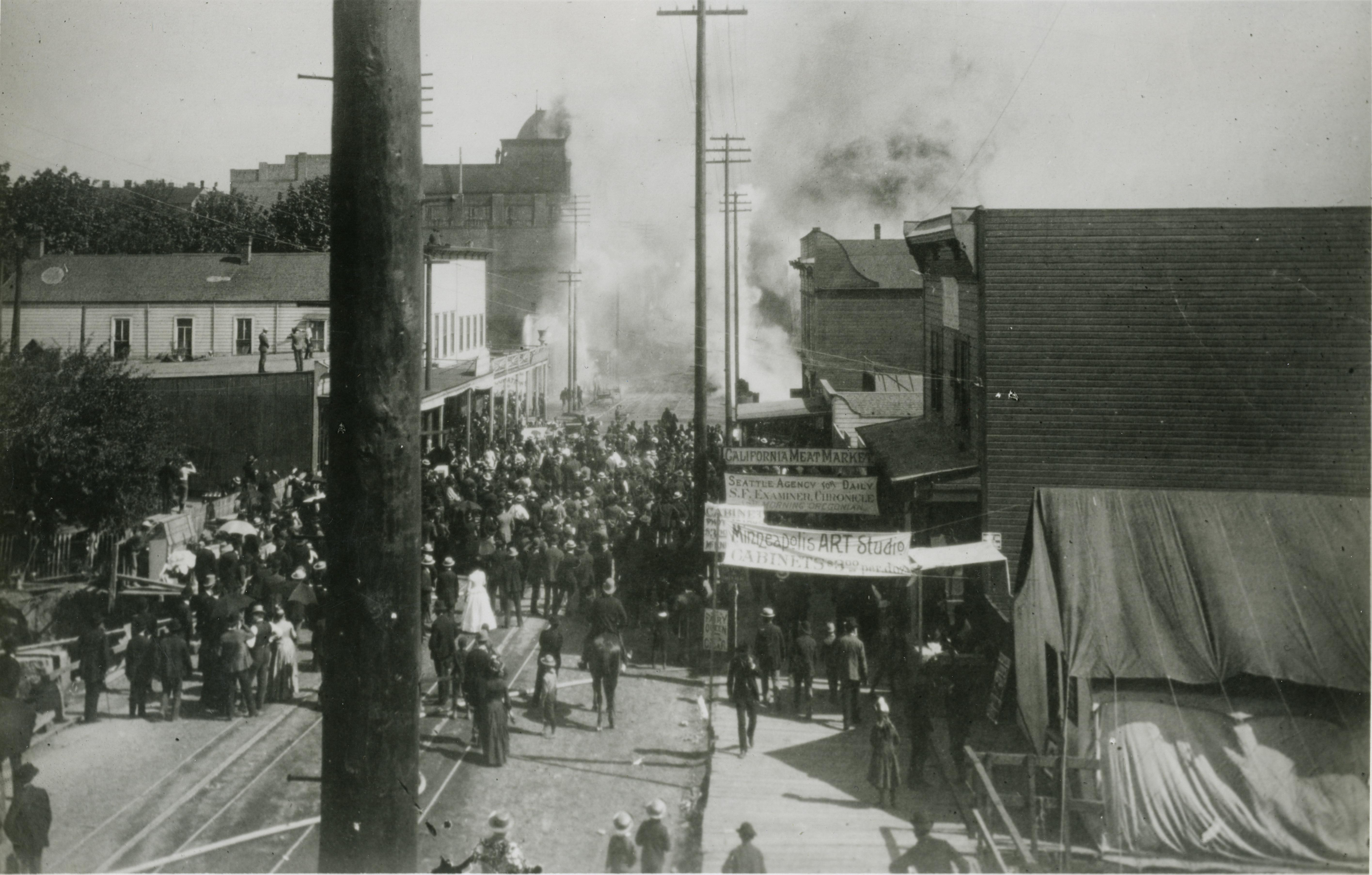
Looking south on Front St. from Spring St. about one-half hour after the fire started

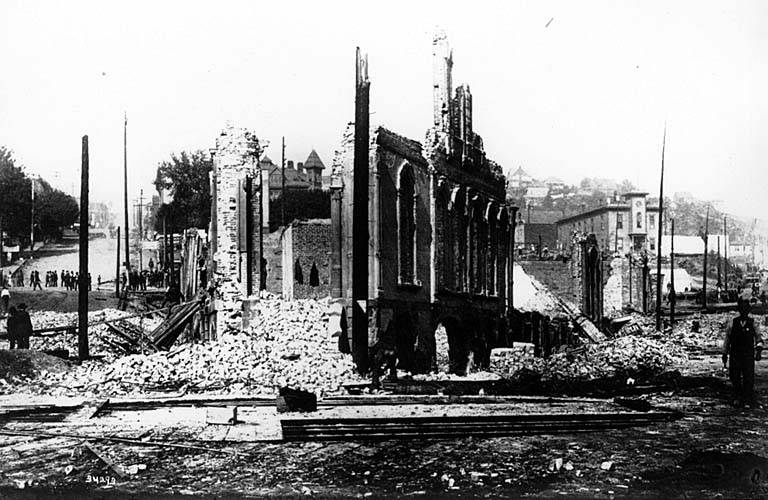
Aftermath of Seattle fire of June 6, 1889, looking east at the ruins of the Occidental Hotel at corner of James St. and Yesler Way

At approximately 2:20 p.m. on June 6, 1889, an accidentally overheated glue pot in a carpentry shop started the most destructive fire in the history of Seattle. The next day, the Seattle Post-Intelligencer, operating out of temporary facilities in the wake of the fire, reported incorrectly that the incident began in "Jim McGough's paint shop, under Smith's boot and shoe store, at the corner of Front and Madison streets, in what was known as the Denny block"; a correction two weeks later said that it "actually started in the Clairmont and Company cabinet shop, below McGough's shop in the basement of the Pontius building", but the original error was often repeated, including in Murray Morgan's bestselling Seattle history book Skid Road (1951). John Back, a 24-year-old Swede, was heating glue over a gasoline fire when it boiled over, igniting the wood chips and turpentine covering the floor. Back attempted to douse the fire with water which spread the fire further. The fire department arrived by 2:45, but by that time the area was so smokey that the source of the fire could not be determined.

=== Spread of fire ===
Fed by the shop's timber and an unusually dry summer, the blaze erupted and shortly devoured the entire block. A nearby liquor store exploded, and the alcohol fueled the flames. The fire quickly spread north to the Kenyon block and the nearby Madison and Griffith blocks. Wooden boardwalks carried the flames across streets to ignite other blocks.

A combination of ill-preparedness and unfortunate circumstances contributed to the great fire. Seattle's water supply was insufficient in fighting the giant inferno. Fire hydrants were sparsely located on every other street, usually connected to small pipes. There were so many hydrants in use during the fire that the water pressure became too weak to combat such a massive blaze. Seattle was also operated by a volunteer fire department, which was competent but inadequate in extinguishing the fire.

=== Magnitude of destruction ===
By the morning of June 7, the fire had burned 25 city blocks, including the business district, four of the city's wharves, and its railroad terminals. The fire would be called the most destructive fire in the history of Seattle. Despite the massive destruction of property, few to no deaths occurred. However, there were fatalities during the cleanup process. Over 1 million rodents were killed. Total losses were estimated at nearly $20 million ($717 million in 2025 dollars).

Among the businesses affected were:

Company	Damage	Insurance
Washington Iron Works	$40,000	$20,000
Moran Brothers	$45,000	$1,000
John Leck, iron works	$12,000	$1,000
Front Street Cable	$15,000	
Gordon Hardware Co.	$120,000	$30,000
Seattle Hardware Co.	$40,000	$30,000

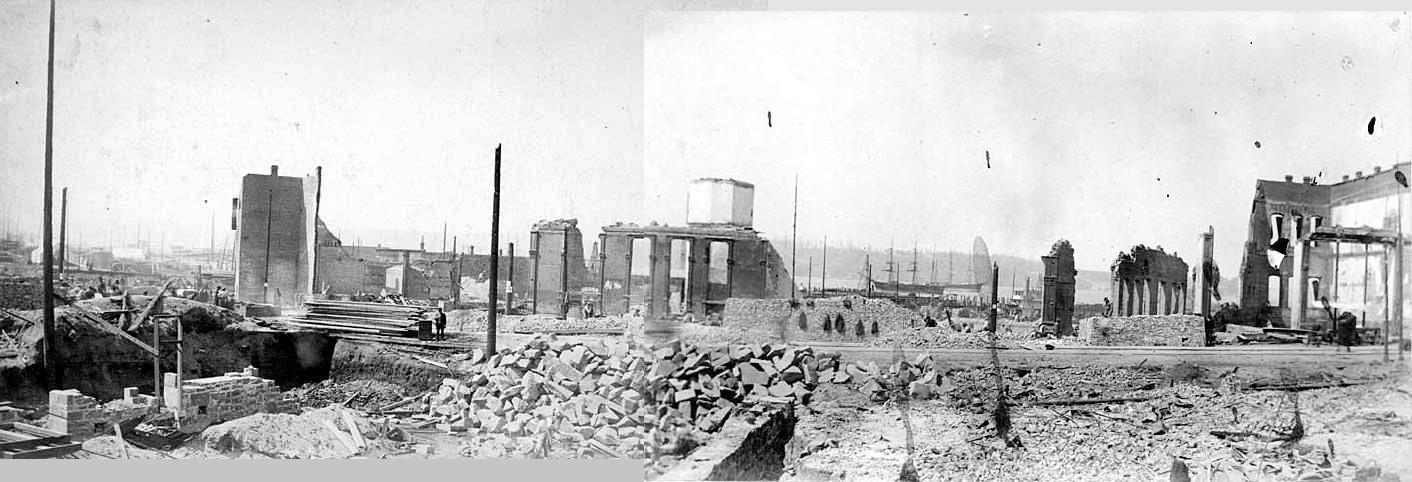
Looking toward Elliott Bay from the burned-over district

== Reconstruction and recovery ==
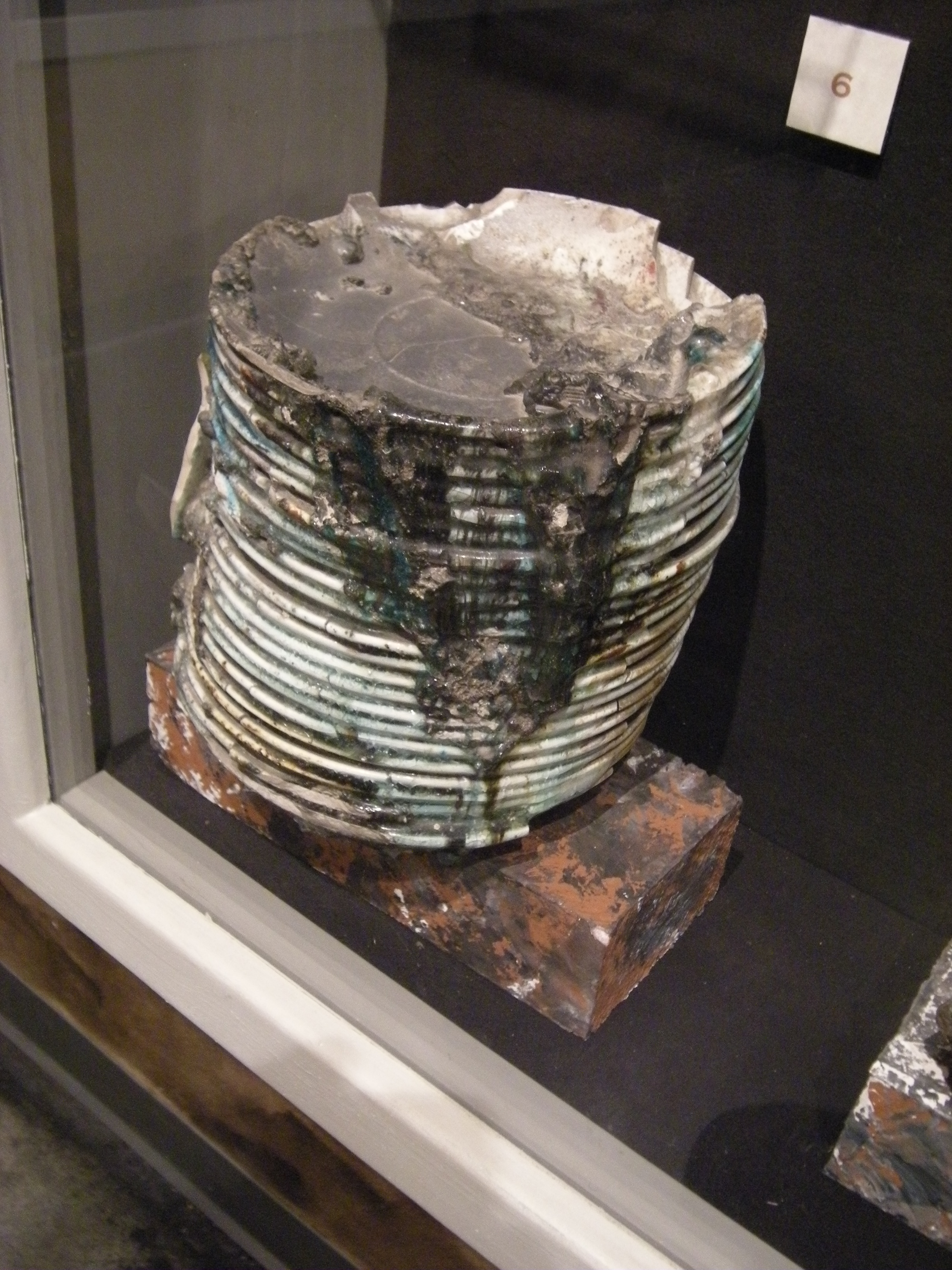
This stack of dishes fused together by the fire is on display at Seattle's Museum of History and Industry

Despite the magnitude of destruction, the rebuilding effort began quickly. Rather than starting over somewhere else, Seattle's citizens chose to rebuild. Seattle rebuilt from the ashes quickly, and the fire killed many rats and other vermin. A new building ordinance resulted in a downtown of brick and stone buildings, rather than wood.

In the year following the fire Seattle's population actually grew by nearly 20,000 to 40,000 inhabitants from the influx of people helping to recreate the city. Supplies and funds came from all over the West Coast to support the relief effort. The population increase made Seattle the largest city in Washington, making it a leading contender in becoming the terminus of the Great Northern Railway.

=== Post-fire reform ===
Seattle made many improvements in response to the fire. The Seattle Fire Department was officially established four months later to replace a volunteer organization with a paid force containing new firehouses and a new chief. The city took control of the water supply, increasing the number of hydrants and adding larger pipes. The advent of brick buildings to downtown Seattle was one of the many architectural improvements the city made in the wake of the fire. New city ordinances set standards for the thickness of walls and required "division walls" between buildings. The changes became principal features of post-fire construction and are still visible in Seattle's Pioneer Square district today, the present-day location of the fire. At Pioneer Square, guided tours are also available to paying customers. Also at this location, visitors can tour the Seattle Underground, where they can visit the original street level (now basement level) of buildings and storefronts that were built after the fire.
