= Great Ellensburg Fire =

1889 fire in the Washington Territory

Coordinates: 46.9959°N 120.5471°W

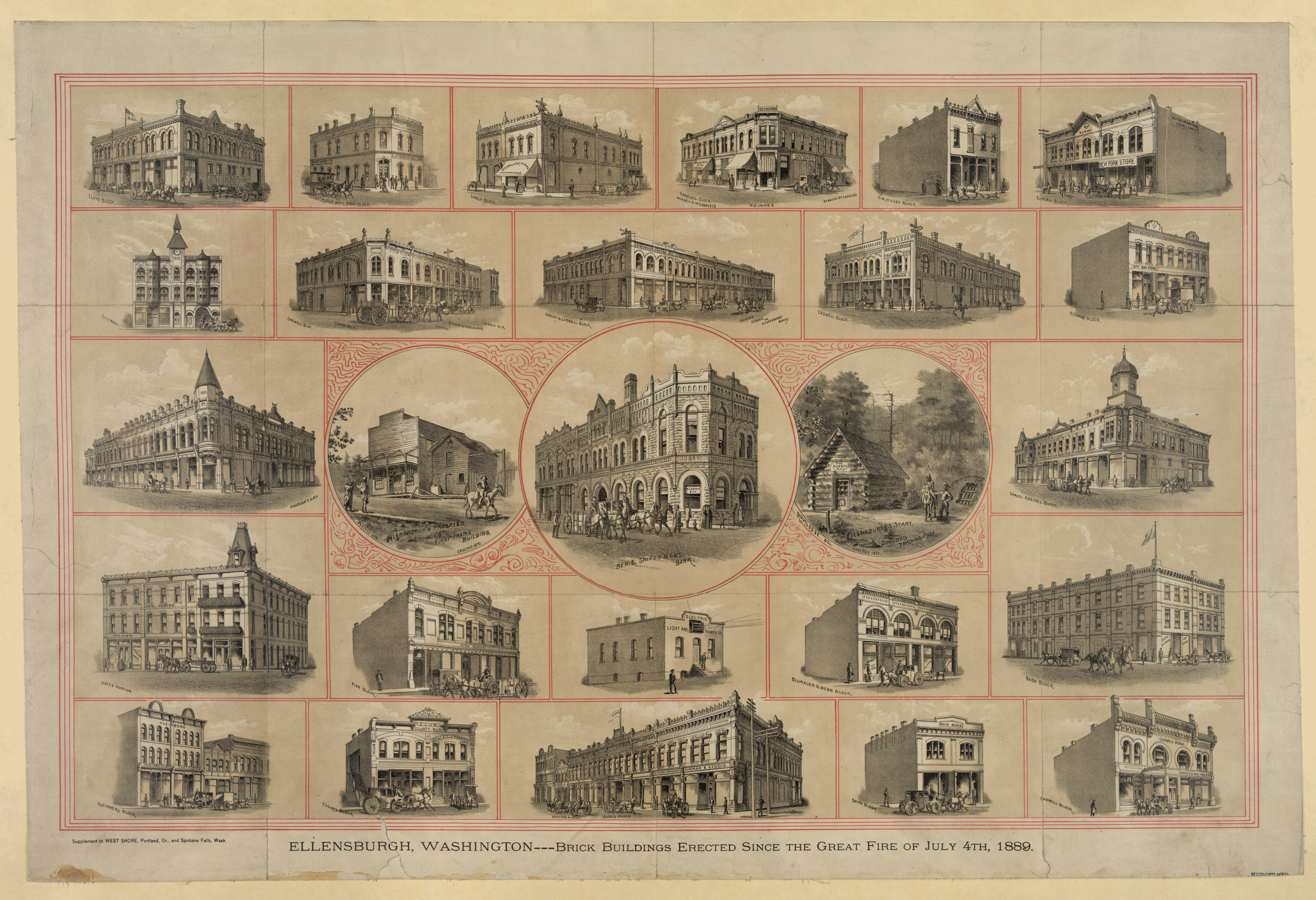
- Historical poster of brick buildings erected in Ellensburg since the Great Fire
- Date: July 4–5, 1889; 10:30 p.m. – 3:30 a.m.

Impacts
- Structures lost: 10 city blocks
- Cost: $2 million ($71.7 million in 2025 dollars)

Ignition
- Cause: Unknown

The Great Ellensburg Fire, also known as the Independence Day Fire, was a fire that destroyed homes and the business district of Ellensburg in 1889, during the same summer that major fires damaged Spokane, Vancouver, and Seattle, all major cities in the Washington Territory.

== The fire ==
The fire began on July 4 in the late evening. The flames were first noticed by people attending a Knights of Pythias dance at the Johnson House Hotel.

The fire department responded promptly, but strong northeast winds prevented them from halting the advance of the conflagration.

The fire lasted from 10:30 P.M. to 3:30 A.M. the next morning, and destroyed over 200 homes and buildings, including 10 blocks in the heart of the city of 4,000. Nearly half of the destroyed buildings had been constructed in the previous two years. Observers who had toured Seattle after its recent fire said the Ellensburg fire destroyed more property in less space. Losses were estimated to be more than $2,000,000 (equivalent to $51,402,010 in 2018).

The sole surviving building in the downtown area was the Lynch block. Built by John Nash in 1888 for $20,000, it is still standing. The city courthouse, located upwind from the flames, survived. The city rebuilt the downtown area rapidly in the following months.

== Possible causes ==
The timing led to suspicion that it was related to the holiday fireworks, although the owner of the grocery store where the fire began speculated that it was started by Indians in revenge for a white man beating an Indian woman. A contemporary news account claimed local citizens found red cards with "You have no pity – we show no mercy" written on them in their yards the next morning. The director of the Kittitas County Historical Museum says the list of possible causes for the fire includes "errant fireworks, insurance fraud, faulty electric lights, striking miners, vagrants displaced by the Seattle fire, disgruntled Native Americans, disgruntled Chinese, even a disgruntled circus that had tried and failed to set up their tent on the edge of town in the high winds that were blowing that day."
