= Cheney Free Press =

American newspaper

- Type: Weekly newspaper
- Owner: Roger Harnack
- Founder: George H. Wallis
- Founded: 1896
- Language: English
- Headquarters: 1616 W. First St. Cheney, WA 99004
- Circulation: 3,695 (as of 2022)
- OCLC number: 17315741
- Website: cheneyfreepress.com

The Cheney Free Press is a weekly newspaper published in Cheney, Washington since in 1896. It was not the first newspapers there; the North-West Tribune was published in Cheney from June 1880 to about 1886, and was the second in Spokane County.

== History ==
The Cheney Free Press was established by three Northwest newspaper veterans, H. H. Hubbard, Dr. D. J. Turner and A. L. Ames. It first published in April 1896. The paper's first editor was George H. Wallis. It was originally delivered by horseback riders and the press stood underneath a tree as there was no building to house it.

In May 1896, Wallis entered a post office to get his mail when he was assaulted by Richard A. Hutchinson in the lobby. The two fought and Wallis ended up with a large gash across his temple and a cracked skull. Hutchinson was upset about an article in the paper and accused Wallis of corruption. Witnesses alleged Hutchinson attacked Wallis with a billy club or a slungshot, but no weapon was found. At trial, the defense argued Wallis actually hurt his head after falling against a desk. The jury convicted Hutchinson of simple assault.

In November 1896, Wallis sold the paper to Fred Z. Alexander, who in turn sold it in 1898 to Spencer L. Alexander. Soon after the purchase, it was announced in a neighboring paper that the Free Press had deserted the Republican party and endorsed the People's Party and the fusion movement. A year later, S.L. Alexander got into a fist fight with Frank A. Dunn, publisher of a rival paper called the Cheney Sentinel. Both were arrested following the brawl in the mud and received minor fines. In 1901, C.F. Stephens and J.W. Stephens succeeded Alexander as publishers.

In 1902, Henry Michels, of North Dakota, purchased the Free Press. Two years his wife ran off after having an affair with a school principal, who lost his job as a result of the scandal. In 1912, the Free Press began dedicating one of its six pages to the local high school, whose students assumed editorial control of the page's contents. In that same year, the Free Press lost a libel suit worth $1,250, and was joined by other Washington newspapers in its call for the state to update its libel laws. In 1913, Michaels died. In 1915, Willis Swank bought the paper from Albert Michels. In 1926, Swank sold the Free Press to Vernon R. Frost and M. L. Spencer, dean of the school of journalism at the University of Washington.

In 1932, burglars ransacked the paper's office, stealing a Remington Typewriter and a rifle. In 1934, V.R. Frost purchased the Buhl Herald in Idaho. His brother Freeman S. Frost was then left in charge of the Free Press. In 1936, Harry N. Beall and Max Schafer bought the paper from the Frosts. In 1941, Beall donated several bound volumes of archived newspapers to Eastern Washington University. During World War II, Beall enlisted in the army as a captain in the supply service. At that time his wife served as publisher. In 1945, Glenn R. Maxwell became publisher.

In 1952, Maxwell died. A year later his estate sold the Free Press to Guyel T. Frost, the third Frost brother to own the paper. In 1968, G.T. Frost died. His $102,000 estate was left to his wife, Ella G. Frost. In 1970, Jerome H. Jerry Jantz and his wife Doris E. Wilbur acquired the paper. In 1989, the Wilbur and Jantz sold the Free Press to Journal News Publishing, owner of the Grant County Journal. At that time the Free Press had a circulation of 3,200. The company was owned by Jeff Fletcher and Bill Ifft, and owned several other small papers in the area, including the Spokane Valley News Herald and Davenport Times. The two also invested in the Newport Miner and the Grand Coulee Star, but eventually sold off their interests to the local owners.

In 2007, Ifft bought out Fletcher and formed his own company called Free Press Publishing, which would publish the Free Press, News Herald and Times. Ifft also obtained the company's 70% stake in the Ritzville Journal. Fletcher maintained ownership of the Journal. At that time Harlan Shellabarger was named Free Press publisher. In 2019, Ifft sold his company to Roger Harnack, who a year later acquired two weeklies: the Odessa Record and The Whitman County Gazette.
