= Shari McMahan =

American educator and university administrator

- Education: University of California, Irvine (BA, PhD); California State University, Northridge (MS)
- Occupations: Academic administrator, public health scholar
- Employer: Eastern Washington University
- Known for: President of Eastern Washington University

Shari McMahan is an American academic administrator who is currently the president of Eastern Washington University.

== Early life and education ==
Shari McMahan grew up in Downey, California and graduated from Downey High School in 1981. Her parents owned an office furniture store in Orange County, California. She earned a bachelor’s degree in social ecology from the University of California, Irvine, a master’s degree in health science from California State University, Northridge, and a Ph.D. in social ecology from the University of California, Irvine.

== Career ==
McMahan began her career as a research staff associate and occupational health consultant at UC Irvine. Later she worked as an occupational safety and health coordinator at Laura Scudder Inc.; an industrial hygiene technician at Allergan; and director of environmental health sciences at ESS Industries.

McMahan developed an interest in health promotion, disease prevention, and public health from her academic coursework, internships, and early career employment. After completing her doctorate she joined California State University, Fullerton (CSUF) as a faculty member in 2000. She served on the health sciences faculty at CSUF for many years, including chairing the Health Sciences department and directing the Center for the Promotion of Healthy Lifestyles and Obesity Prevention. In 2011 she was appointed Dean of the College of Health and Human Development, and in 2014 she became deputy Provost at CSUF.

McMahan was named provost and vice president for academic affairs at California State University, San Bernardino in 2016, becoming the first woman provost in the history of the university.

McMahan was selected as the twenty-seventh president of Eastern Washington University in 2022.

== Personal life ==
McMahan is the mother of two children.
