= Walter G. Ronald =

American politician

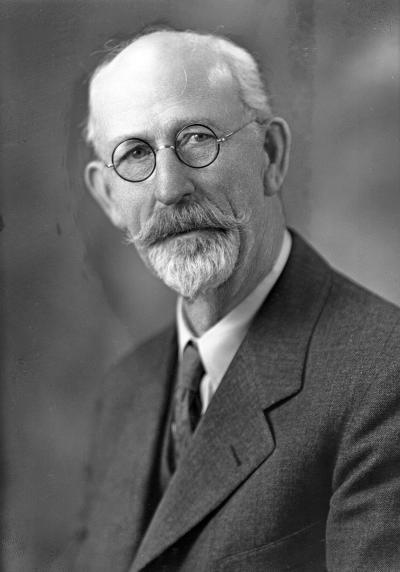
- Ronald in 1933

President pro tempore of the Washington Senate
- In office January 9, 1933 – January 14, 1935
- Preceded by: W. J. Sutton
- Succeeded by: Ed Pierce

Member of the Washington Senate from the 13th district
- In office January 9, 1933 – January 11, 1937
- Preceded by: Jacob H. Miller
- Succeeded by: Dr. A. C. Wingrove

Personal details
- Born: August 18, 1857
- Died: May 31, 1936 (aged 78) Seattle, Washington, U.S.
- Party: Democratic

Walter G. Ronald (August 18, 1857 – May 31, 1936) was an American politician in the state of Washington. He served in the Washington State Senate from 1933 to 1937. From 1933 to 1935, he was President pro tempore of the Senate.
