= Rob Curley =

American media executive

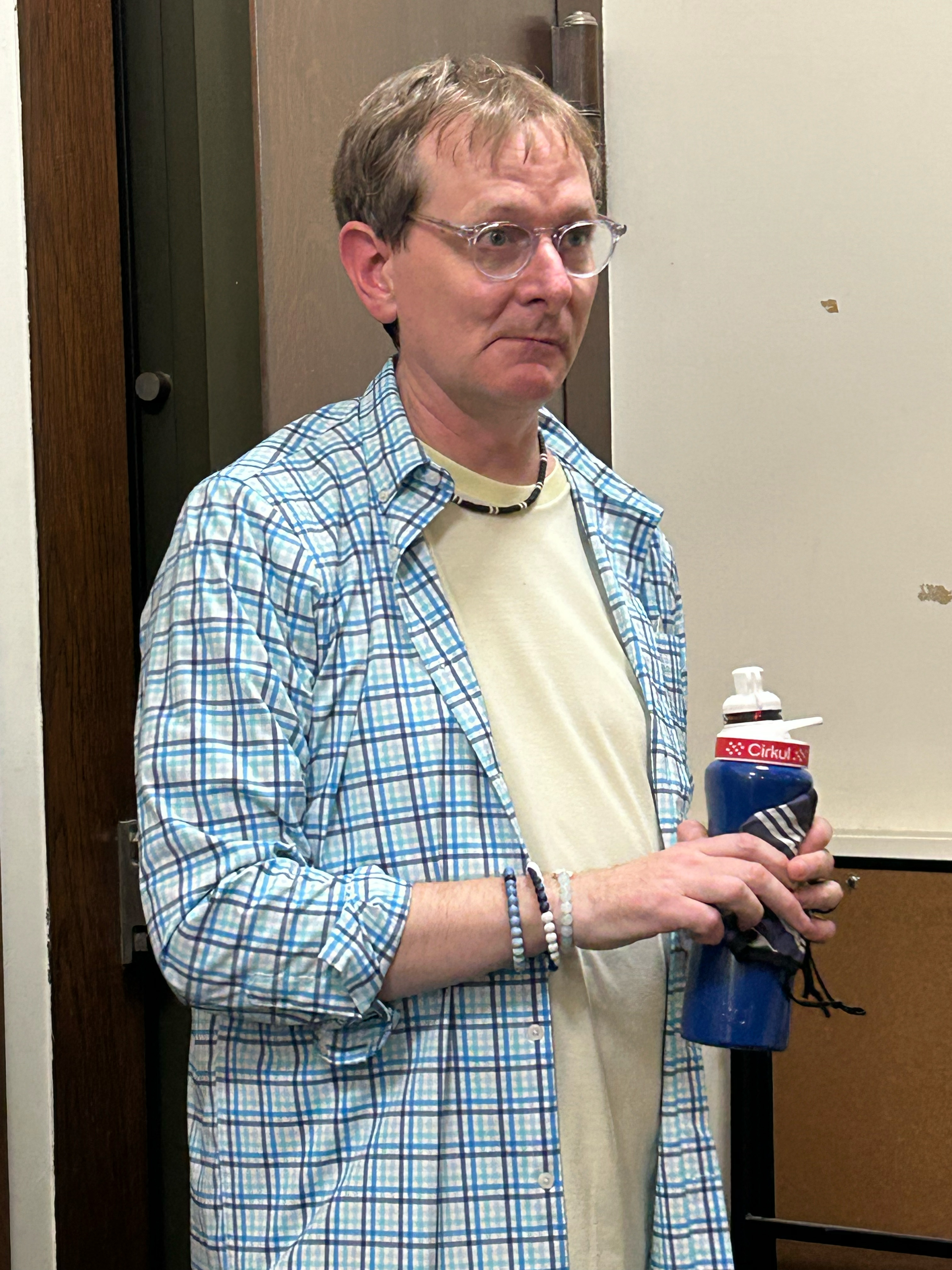
- Curley in 2023
- Born: January 10, 1971 (age 55); Osage County, Kansas, United States
- Education: Emporia State University
- Years active: 1997–present
- Website: robcurley.com

Rob Curley (born January 10, 1971) is the former president and executive editor of Greenspun Interactive, the new-media division of the Las Vegas Sun and Greenspun Media Group. Curley has been distinguished for his work in hyperlocal convergence journalism. He left the Sun in May 2012 to pursue other interests.

In 2016 Curley became the editor for The Spokesman-Review in Spokane, Washington. He was placed on administrative leave in 2026 pending investigation.

== Naples Daily News ==
Prior to joining the Las Vegas Sun in June 2008, Curley was the Vice President of Product Development for Washingtonpost.Newsweek Interactive for two years. Curley was brought on to the WPNI staff on October 2, 2006.

Prior to moving to The Washington Post, Rob Curley was the Director of New Media/Convergence of the Naples Daily News between 2005 and 2006.

With his team of Eric Moritz (programmer), Levi Chronister (site manager), and Kori Rumore (designer), they redesigned the award-winning Bonitanews.com. Under Curley's leadership, the work of Ellyn Angelotti at Bonitanews.com picked up a NAA Digital Edge award for "Most Innovative Multimedia Storytelling" in February, 2006 for its high school sports coverage.

The Naples Daily News' main site, Naplesnews.com, was relaunched in January, 2006 with much of the same team, Eric Moritz (programmer), Levi Chronister (site manager), and Todd Soligo (designer). Under Curley's leadership, Naplesnews.com received an Editor & Publisher Eppy Award for "Best Internet News Service (fewer than one million unique visitors per month) in 2006".

== The Spokesman Review ==
Curley joined The Spokesman Review in August 2016 and is the Executive Editor as of 2023.

=== 2026 investigation ===
On August 11, 2026 The Spokesman-Review and Cowles Company announced Curley was placed on administrative leave pending an investigation into several personnel complaints.
