= 1912 State Normal School at Cheney fire =

1912 school fire incident in Cheney, Washington

Coordinates: 47.491°N 117.583°W

The 1912 State Normal School at Cheney fire consumed the main classroom and office building of the State Normal School at Cheney, in Cheney, Washington, on April 24, 1912. There were no deaths, but the destruction of the building led to a prolonged political fight over whether the state legislature and governor would close the institution, or authorize funds for its replacement.

== The fire ==
The alarm sounded about one-thirty on April 24, 1912 by Mr. N.E. Hinch, head of the English department, who lived on the corner near what is now Hargreaves Hall (as of 2017). Two members of the faculty, J. R. Work and Max Miranda, who were sleeping on the third floor of the building, had to jump out the window of the burning building to firefighters waiting below. The fire's cause was unknown but was speculated to be faulty wiring. The fire was discovered in the basement of the main building. By 2:30 a.m., the walls were still standing, but the interior was a total loss. The damages totaled approx. $400,000. The heating plant, training school building, gas plant, water system, and one other building were the only structures left standing.

== The immediate impact of the fire ==
On April 24, 1912, the Board of Trustees met in Spokane. Governor Hay was supportive, and encouraged the rebuilding of The Cheney Normal Building. The loss was estimated to be at $250,000 and no insurance was held on the building. The Board had to immediately purchase new equipment and school supplies for their upcoming summer school session, as well as a new modern fireproof structure. Due to the fire occurring in the middle of the school year, classes proceeded without any interruption in the Congregational church, Methodist church, and other buildings. The local businesses in Cheney and Spokane generously gave donations to departments and offered special prices to the State Normal School. The fire had destroyed almost all of the normal school's records: J. Orin Oliphant, who wrote the first history of the institution in 1924, remarked that "the fire of 1912 swept everything before it. Not a scrap of paper was saved from the building."

== Looking toward the future ==
Before the new buildings were built, a fire escape slide was immediately purchased by Mr. Stronach. During the process of hiring a new architect, the potential architect met with the Board of Trustees, sent in sample sketches, and had to provide letters stating recommendations and credentials. After this rigorous process, the Board still could not come to a conclusion about who should fulfill the coveted position of architect. In addition to the precautions taken while hiring a new architect, a watchman was also hired to monitor the school grounds during all hours of the night.

== The impact of the government on rebuilding ==
Governor Marion E. Hay, who was in the area at the time of the fire, encouraged the rebuilding of the school. He spoke to a crowd of about 1000 students and other citizens later in the morning after the fire speaking about his commitment to build a bigger and better building that would be fireproof. After Hay lost his re-election campaign in 1912 to Ernest Lister, the incoming governor opposed the rebuilding of the school: despite Lister's vocal opposition and his attempt to veto the bill authorizing the new building, a coalition of "democrats, progressives and republicans united to carry it over his veto." The San Juan Islander, in reporting on the veto override in its March 21, 1913 issue, commented that "it was shown to us that the students of this school were mostly the sons and daughters of the poor, who were struggling to become teachers and would probably be deprived of this hope if the Cheney school was not rebuilt." Lister came to Cheney in person in April 1913 to inform the citizens that, though he had opposed the rebuilding of the normal school, now that the legislature had insisted on its restoration, he would see that the new structure was of the highest quality. During this speech, he also announced a reorganization of the normal school's board, which included the appointment of the first woman trustee, Mary A. Monroe, a school principal in Spokane who he described as "peculiarly fitted to give good service to this institution in Cheney."

In 1913, the Session Laws added a new provision, Chapter 70, in order to aid in the rebuilding of Cheney Normal School. The state would give no more than $300,000 to the Normal School for building costs. In 1915, $92,183.60 was given to the Cheney Normal School following this provision. No other state school was given this extra funding in 1915.

== See also ==
- 1891 State Normal School at Cheney fire
