= Spokane Daily Chronicle =

American newspaper

- Front page on July 12, 2021
- Type: online newspaper
- Format: former broadsheet
- Owner: Cowles Company
- Publisher: William Stacey Cowles
- Editor: Rob Curley
- Founded: June 29, 1881 (144 years ago)
- Relaunched: July 12, 2021
- Language: English
- Headquarters: 999 W. Riverside Ave. Spokane, Washington
- Country: United States
- ISSN: 2992-9873 (print); 2992-9881 (web)
- Website: spokesman.com

The Spokane Daily Chronicle is a daily digital newspaper in Spokane, Washington. It was founded as a weekly paper in 1881 and grew into an afternoon daily, competing with The Spokesman-Review, which was formed from the merger of two competing papers.

== History ==
In 1897, the Chronicle was acquired by William H. Cowles and became part of the Cowles Publishing Company. Cowles already owned The Spokesman-Review. Both papers operated out of the Review Building until 1921, but were kept independent; The Spokesman-Review had a Republican political slant, and the two papers maintained a friendly rivalry. The Chronicle moved into its own building next door in 1921. The following year the Chronicle started radio station KOE, setting up an antenna on the taller Review building. The station operated for less than a year.

A Chronicle Building was first planned in 1917. The final building that remains standing today was designed by G.A. Pehrson in Downtown Spokane and completed in 1928. Kirtland Cutter made the designs for the building, but his architecture business ran into financial difficulties, and he left town. Pehrson, who had worked at Cutter's firm for ten years before establishing his own firm, took over the project and developed his own designs.

Cowles continued to operate the papers independently until their ad sales and back-end operations were combined in the 1980s. The sports staffs were combined in 1981 and news staffs in 1983. The Chronicle was shut down in 1992 after 111 years in operation and more than 26,000 editions printed. The landmark building remained in use as an office building, later being converted into apartments.

On June 20, 2021, it was announced that the paper would resume publication on July 12, 2021, as a digital-only afternoon supplement for subscribers of The Spokesman-Review.

== Notable persons ==
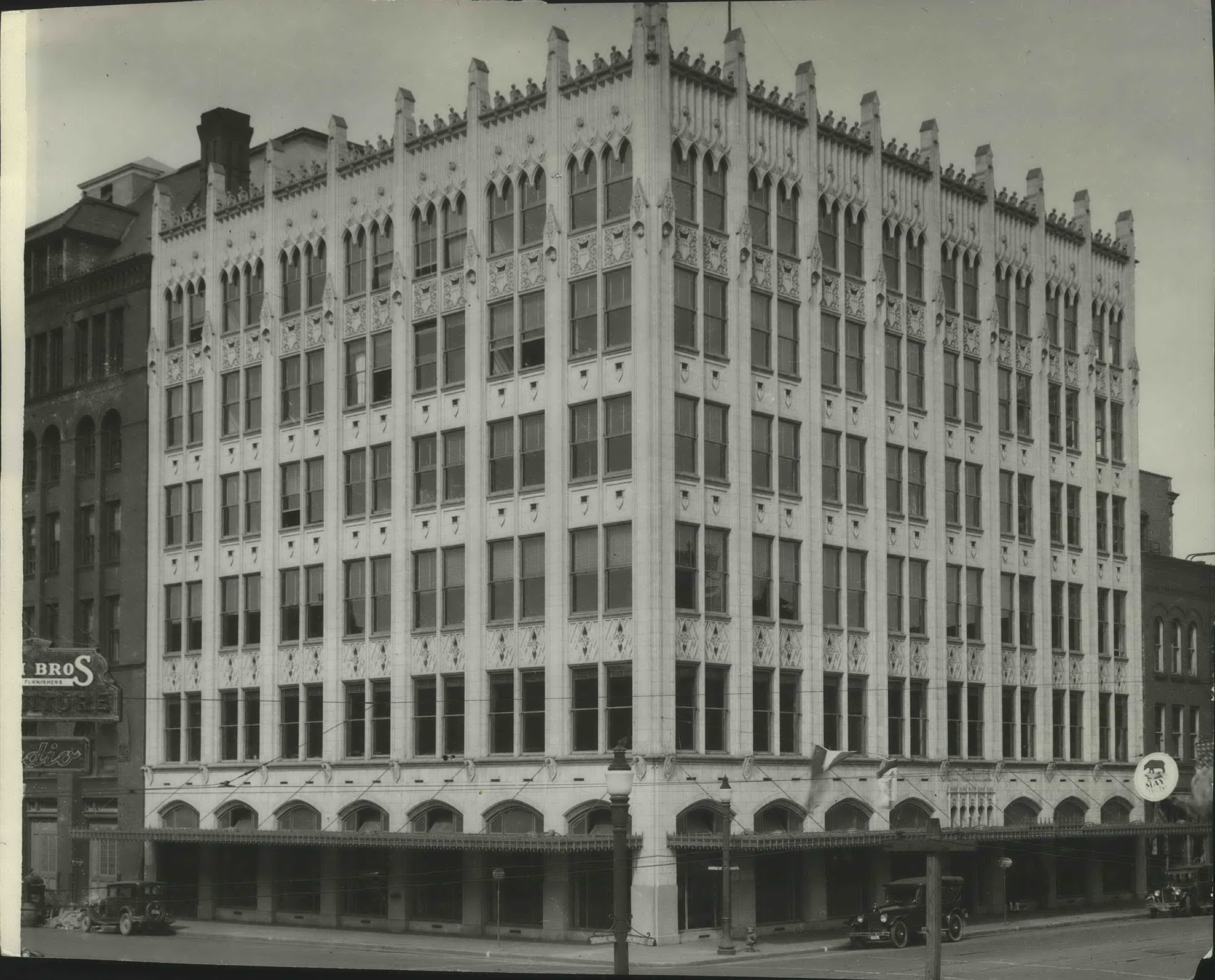
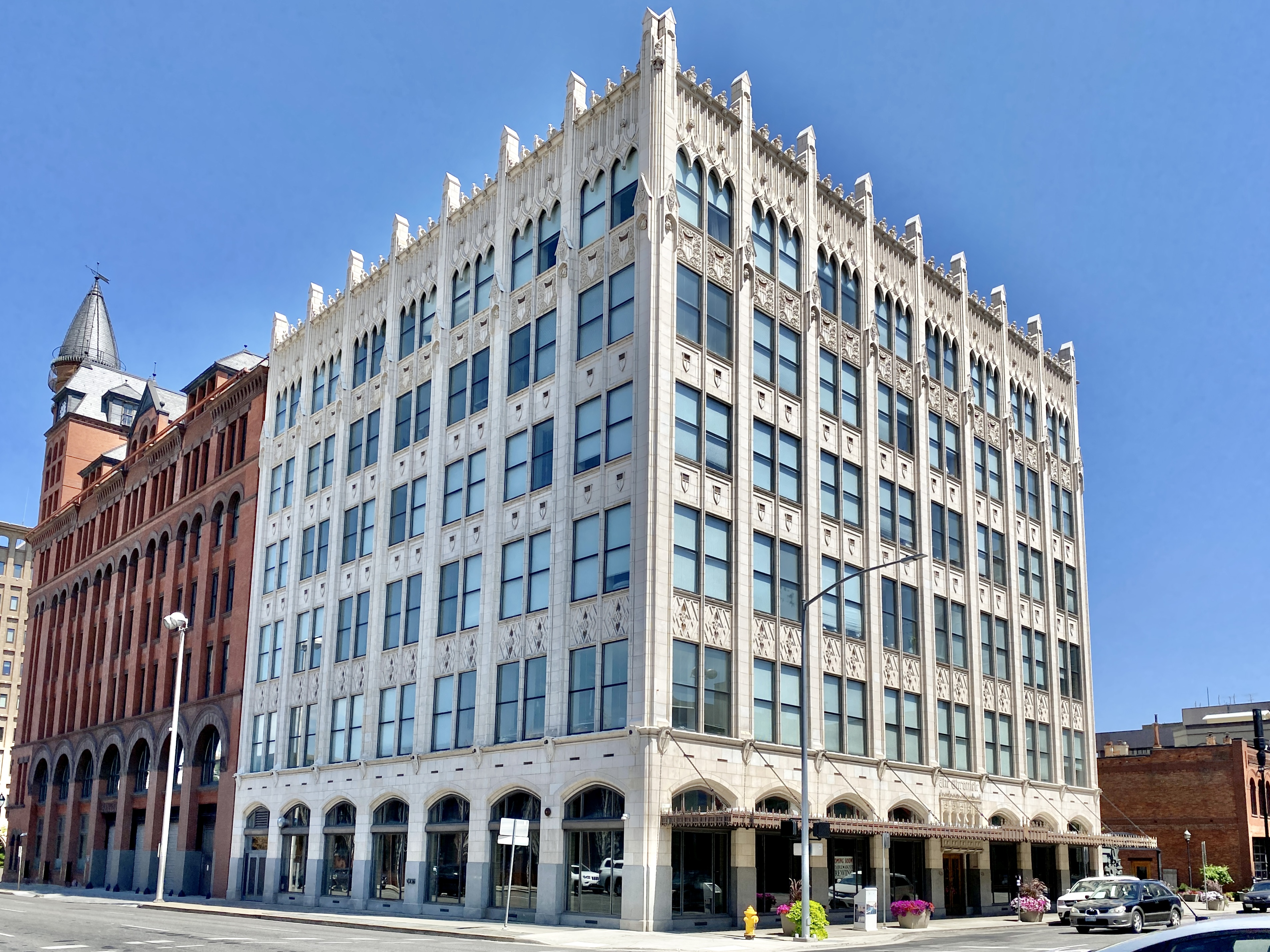
The Chronicle building was built in 1928 and was the home of the Spokane Daily Chronicle until its closure in 1992. Pictured is the building ca. 1934 and 2015

Managing editor Gordon Coe, a longtime employee at the paper, was reporting on a serial rapist and even operated a tip line for information. It transpired that his son Kevin Coe was the rapist.

Fenton Roskelley wrote about the outdoors at the paper after starting out as a copy-editor in 1940, served in World War II, returned to the paper after the war, became an outdoors columnist in 1958, continued outdoors coverage until 2003 and died in 2013. His son John Roskelley became a renowned mountaineer and served as a County commissioner in Spokane. The former county commissioner's company car was equipped with a boat hitch.

Bing Crosby, born Harry Lillis Crosby, took his name from a character in the Bingville Bugle comic strip that ran on Sundays in The Spokesman-Review. His brother Ted worked at the Chronicle at one time.
