= Review Building =

- U.S. National Register of Historic Places
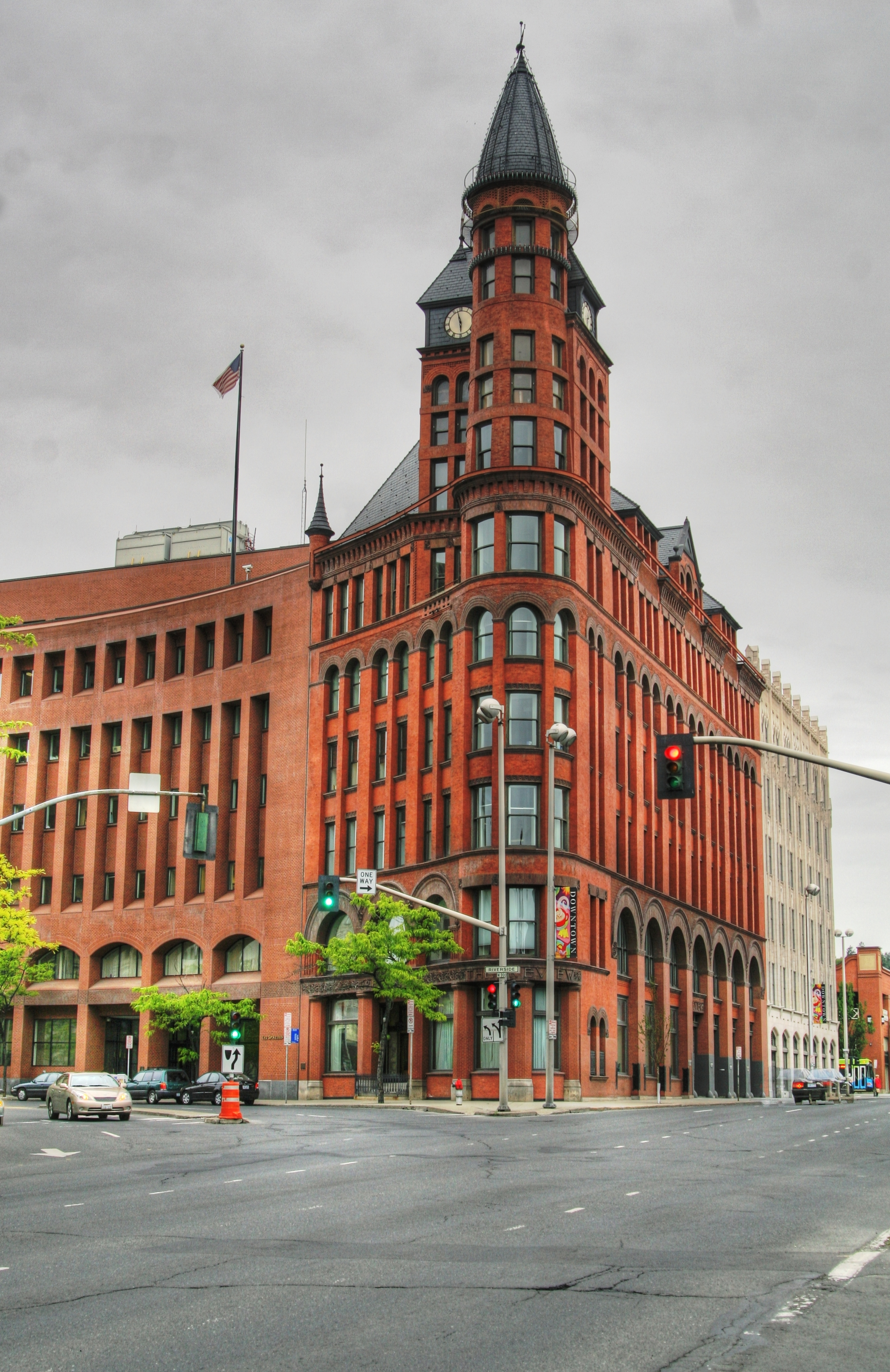
- The building in 2008

- Location within Spokane riverfront area
- Location: SE corner, Riverside Avenue and Monroe Street, Spokane, Washington
- Coordinates: 47°39′28″N 117°25′35″W
- Area: less than one acre
- Built: 1891
- Architect: Chauncey B. Seaton
- Architectural style: Romanesque Revival
- NRHP reference No.: 75001875
- Added to NRHP: February 24, 1975

The Review Building is a historic six-story building in Spokane, Washington. It was designed in the Romanesque Revival style, and built with terra cotta in 1891 to house the offices of The Spokane Falls Review, later The Spokesman-Review. It has been listed on the National Register of Historic Places since February 24, 1975.
