= Eastern Washington University =

Public university in Cheney, Washington, U.S.

- Former names: Eastern Washington State College (1961–1977); Eastern Washington College of Education (1937–1961); State Normal School at Cheney (1889–1937); Benjamin P. Cheney Academy (1882–1889)
- Type: Public university
- Established: April 3, 1882; 144 years ago
- Accreditation: NWCCU
- Academic affiliations: COP
- Endowment: $41.23 million (2025)
- Budget: $331,834,000 (2026)
- President: Shari McMahan
- Provost: Lorenzo M. Smith
- Faculty: 802
- Administrative staff: 830
- Students: 9,922 (2025)
- Location: Cheney, Washington, United States; 47°29′29″N 117°34′59″W
- Campus: 300 acres (120 ha); Fringe town
- Other campuses: Spokane
- Newspaper: The Easterner
- Colors: Red and white
- Nickname: Eagles
- Sporting affiliations: NCAA Division I FCS – Big Sky
- Mascot: Swoop
- Website: www.ewu.edu
- Washington State Normal School at Cheney
- U.S. National Register of Historic Places
- U.S. Historic district
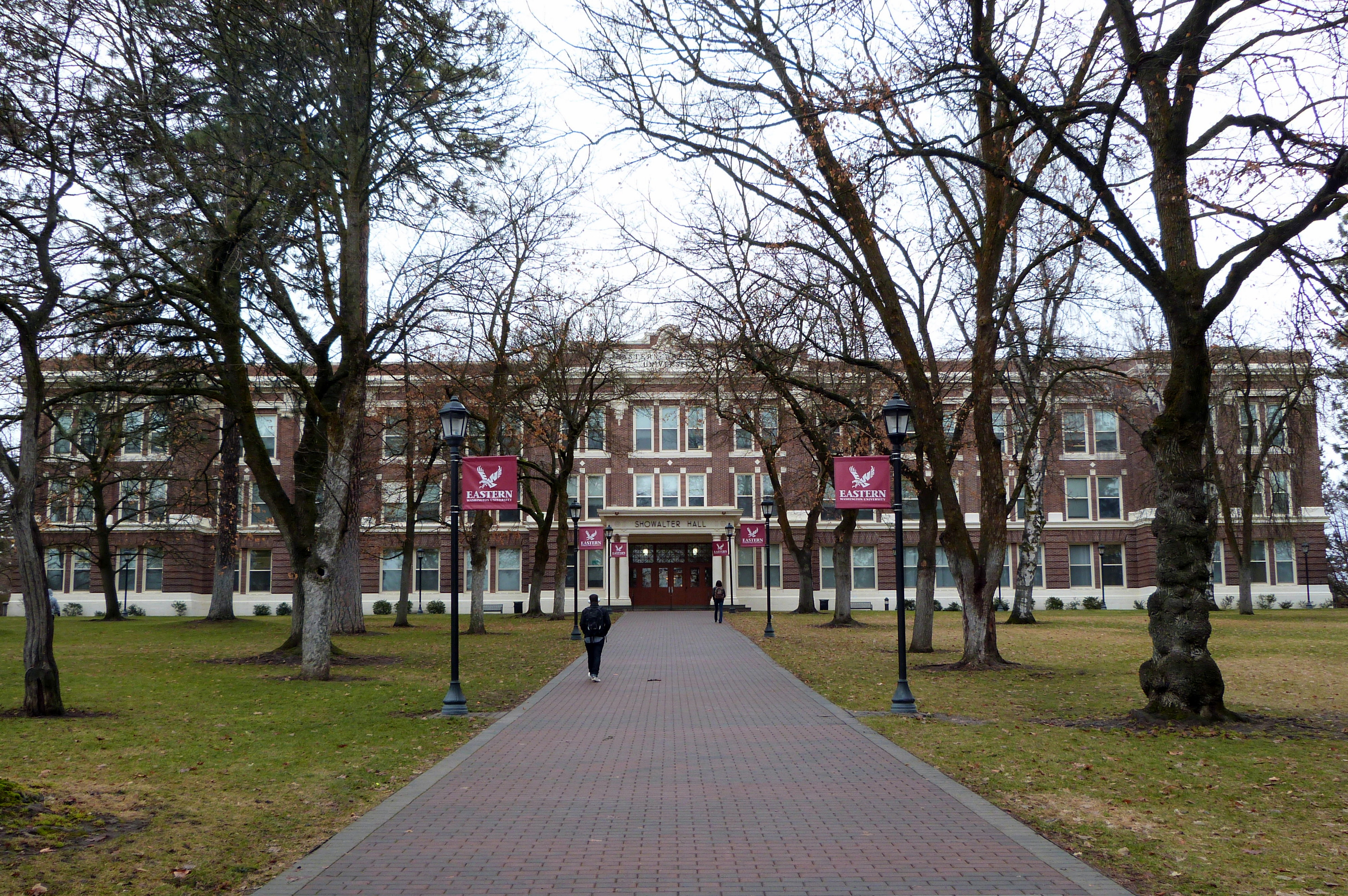
- Showalter Hall at Eastern Washington University, viewed northwest from 5th Street
- NRHP reference No.: 92001287
- Added to NRHP: October 1, 1992
- Location within Washington (state) Location within USA West

Eastern Washington University (EWU) is a public university in Cheney, Washington, United States, with a satellite campus in Spokane, Washington. EWU also offers several academic programs at off-campus locations, including Bellevue College and Everett University Center.

Founded in 1882, the university is academically divided into five colleges: the College of Arts, Humanities & Social Sciences; the College of Health Science & Public Health; the College of Professional Programs; the College of Science, Technology, Engineering & Mathematics; and Graduate Studies & Research.

== History ==
The city of Cheney, then known as Depot Springs, was surveyed in 1880 along the tracks of the Northern Pacific Railroad; expressman Benjamin Pierce Cheney was a member of that railroad's board of directors. Officials renamed the city for Cheney by October 1880, prompting him to donate $10,000 to establish the Benjamin P. Cheney Academy in 1882 on an 8-acre (3.2 ha) site at present-day Showalter Hall. At the time, the school was a private institution losing pupils to the competing public school district; after Washington was admitted to the union in 1889, the Enabling Act allowed the establishment of normal schools in the new state and in 1890 the school was renamed the State Normal School at Cheney to train future elementary school teachers. The first class of teachers began their studies on October 13, 1890, under the administration of W. W. Gillette (principal) and William J. Sutton (vice principal).

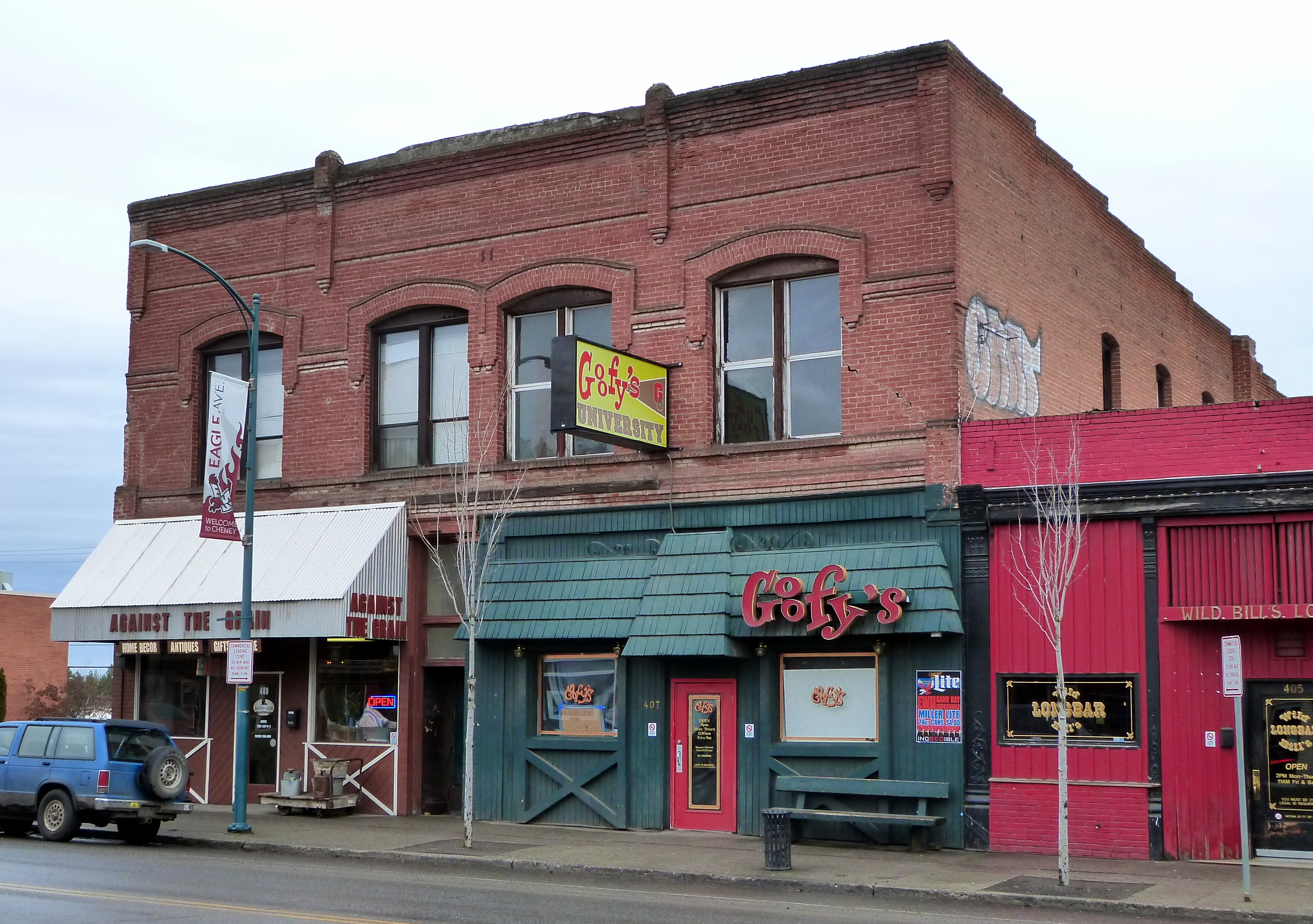
Pomeroy Building, which served as the temporary home of Cheney Normal School for 1893–96 (photographed in 2015)

The campus was almost totally destroyed twice by fire in 1891 and 1912, but was rebuilt each time. On August 27, 1891, while the original 1882 Cheney Academy building was being expanded, the first fire destroyed the building and unfinished addition, and classes were moved to the Pomeroy building in downtown Cheney temporarily. Sutton took over as principal in 1892 and spearheaded an appropriation of $60,000 in 1895 from the state for a new building, completed in 1896 at the site of the former Academy building. Sutton resigned in 1897, and shortly afterward, Governor John R. Rogers vetoed funding for the fledgling school, forcing it to cancel classes for the 1897–98 school year. Locals provided enough funding to operate the school in 1898, and state funding resumed in 1899.

Noah D. Showalter was elected president of the Normal School in 1911, just before the second fire destroyed the 1896 building on April 24, 1912. Like Sutton before him, Showalter urged the state to pass an appropriation of $300,000 to pay for a new building; after Governor Ernest Lister vetoed the appropriation, the veto was overridden by the legislature under the leadership of Sutton, then serving as a State Senator.

Julius Zittel was selected to design the new administration building, which was dedicated on May 22, 1915, and later renamed to Showalter Hall in 1940. The Herculean Pillars, at the intersection of 5th and College, were also completed in 1915, using materials salvaged from the 1896 Normal School building, and served as the entrance to the school for those arriving from the downtown train station.

Cheney Normal School continued to grow, opening its first dormitories in 1916 (Monroe Hall), 1920 (Senior Hall), and 1923 (Sutton Hall); in 1929, it completed the President's House (now University House), to serve as the residence for the school's president. All were designed by Zittel. A new building to house the Training School for future teachers was opened in 1937 and named Martin Hall to honor Governor and local resident Clarence Martin. That same year, Cheney Normal School was renamed to Eastern Washington College of Education. On June 4, 1940, the new campus library was opened as Hargreaves Hall (designed by Rasque), and the former administration building was formally dedicated to Noah Showalter.

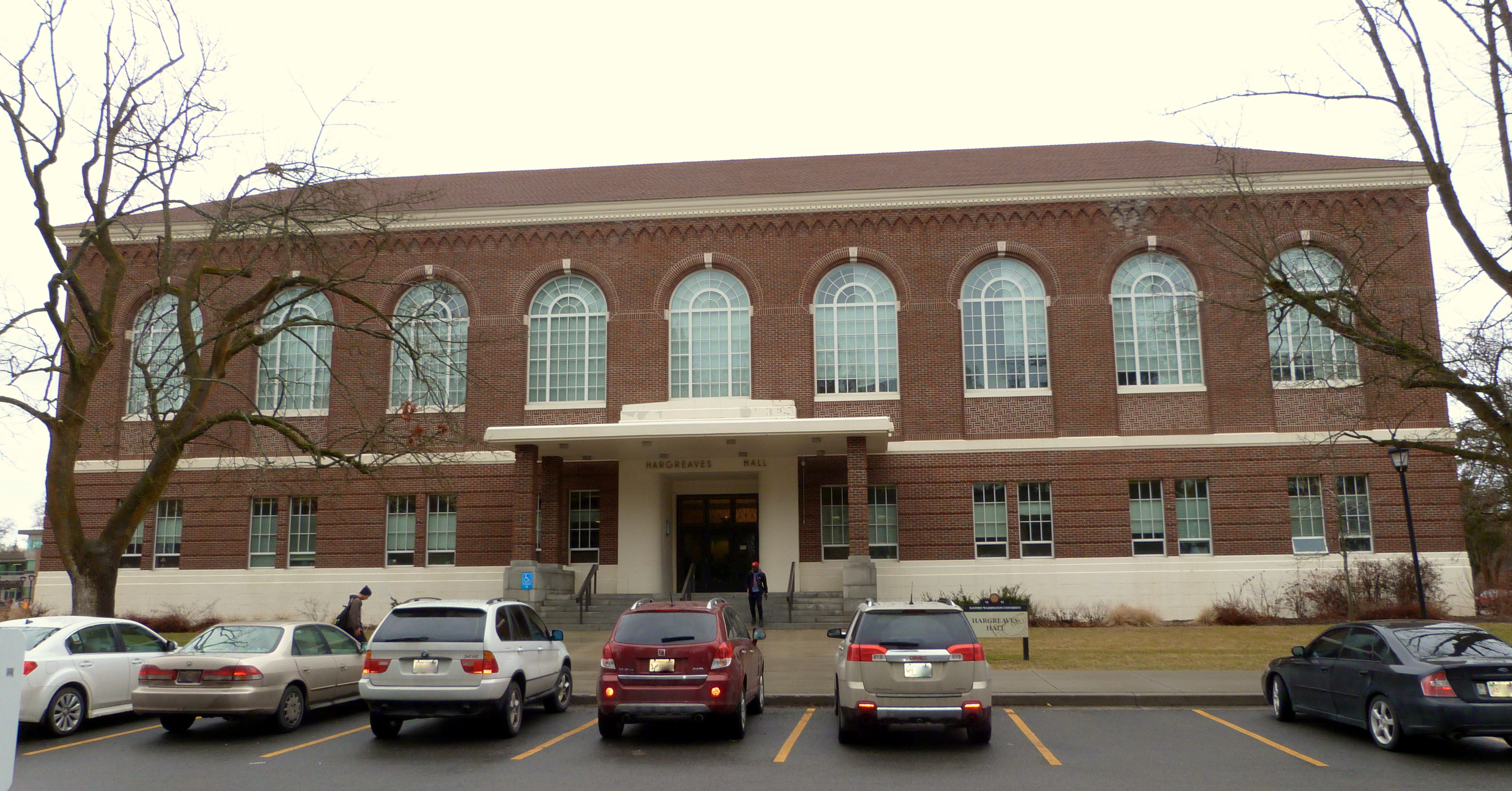
Hargreaves Hall (photographed in 2015)

The school grew quickly following World War II, and became Eastern Washington State College in 1961. During this era, Eastern added various graduate and undergraduate degree programs. In 1977, the school's name was changed to Eastern Washington University by the Washington State Legislature.

In 1992, the core of the campus was listed on the National Register of Historic Places.

In July 2024, amid a continuing drop in enrollment and inability to differentiate itself with the other regional universities in Washington (Western Washington University and Central Washington University), university president Shari McMahan announced that EWU would rebrand to a polytechnic university, emphasizing applied and experiential learning over theoretical discussions. The change drew criticism from students and faculty in the humanities, fearing that arts-related programs would be reduced or overlooked in the change. The university plans to expand internship opportunities and work with employers to offer more degrees for in-demand fields.

== Campus locations ==
The main campus of Eastern Washington University is located in Cheney. EWU also operates facilities in Spokane, including the Catalyst and SIERR Buildings, and offers programs in other parts of Washington and online.

== Academics ==
EWU offers bachelor's, master's, and applied doctoral degrees as well as certificates, with undergraduate and graduate programs available in Spokane and online.

In 2025, EWU received a Research Colleges and Universities designation under the Carnegie Classification of Institutions of Higher Education. The 2025 Carnegie framework also classifies EWU as a Mixed Undergraduate/Graduate-Doctorate Medium institution based on its degree offerings and institutional size.

Academic rankings

Regional
- U.S. News & World Report: 52

=== Research ===
Eastern Washington University conducts research through various institutes, centers, and collaborative projects in the region.

==== Institutes & centers ====
- Cybersecurity Center — Supports cybersecurity research, industry partnerships, educational programs, and the GenCyber Student Camp.
- Institute for Public Policy & Economic Analysis — Created in 2002 to conduct applied research on economic, social, and public policy issues and “provide readily available and extensive data for communities across Washington state.”
- Turnbull Laboratory for Ecological Studies — Established through a partnership with the U.S. Fish and Wildlife Service in 1975 to support hands-on field research for students.

==== Regional projects ====
- Palouse Prairie Restoration Project — This project aims to restore 120 acres of former agricultural land west of the university’s Cheney campus to its native prairie habitat. The project incorporates research by faculty and students in areas including ecology, biology, geology, and soil science.
- West Plains PFAS Study — With a $450,000 grant from the Washington Department of Ecology, EWU researchers have studied the distribution and movement of per- and polyfluoroalkyl substances (PFAS) in groundwater across the West Plains of Spokane County. In collaboration with the City of Medical Lake, researchers conducted groundwater sampling and developed models of PFAS contamination and groundwater flow. The study has contributed data used by state and local agencies in addressing the contamination.

== Student life ==
Student body composition as of Fall 2025
Race and ethnicity	Total
White	60%
Hispanic	19%
Two or more races	7%
Unknown	5%
Black	4%
Asian	2%
American Indian/Alaska Native	1%
Native Hawaiian/Pacific Islander	1%
Economic diversity
Low-income (Note: The percentage of students who received an income-based federal Pell grant intended for low-income students.)	38%
Affluent (Note: The percentage of students who are a part of the American middle class at the bare minimum.)	62%

=== Pence Union Building (PUB) ===
The Pence Union Building, or PUB, is the community gathering place for Eastern Washington University. The PUB features the Eagle Store, student organization and Associated Students (ASEWU) offices, dining options, a game room, meeting rooms, and event spaces.

=== University Recreation Center (URC) ===
The University Recreation Center (URC) is a three-level 117,699-square-foot (10,934.6 m^{2}) recreational facility that opened on campus in 2008. The facility has a 19,455-square-foot (1,807.4 m^{2}) multi-purpose arena that can operate as an ice rink and general-purpose sports floor, 30-foot (9.1 m) indoor climbing wall with 11 routes (one simulating ice climbing) and two bouldering walls, an indoor parking garage, 17,000-square-foot (1,600 m^{2}) fitness center and gymnasium, campus dining facility known as "The Roost" and a two-lane 200-meter running track.

=== The Easterner ===
The Easterner is the student-run newspaper and is independent of the university. The paper is published online regularly during the fall, winter, and spring quarters. The EWU student newspaper was first published in 1916 as The State Normal School Journal. The publication changed its name to The Easterner in 1951.

=== Cultural and identity centers ===
The JLR Multicultural Center offers cultural programming, educational opportunities, and student resources, while the Eagle Pride Center provides resources and programming for LGBTQ+ students. The Women's and Gender Education (WAGE) Center promotes gender equity and gives students the skills to critically and actively engage with the world.

=== Student organizations and Greek life ===
The student body's government, the Associated Students of Eastern Washington University, dates to 1919–1920, and organizes the work of a wide range of student committees. The Student Engagement office oversees more than 100 student clubs and organizations on campus that cater to a wide variety of interests and activities. EWU also has an active sorority and fraternity community.

== Athletics ==
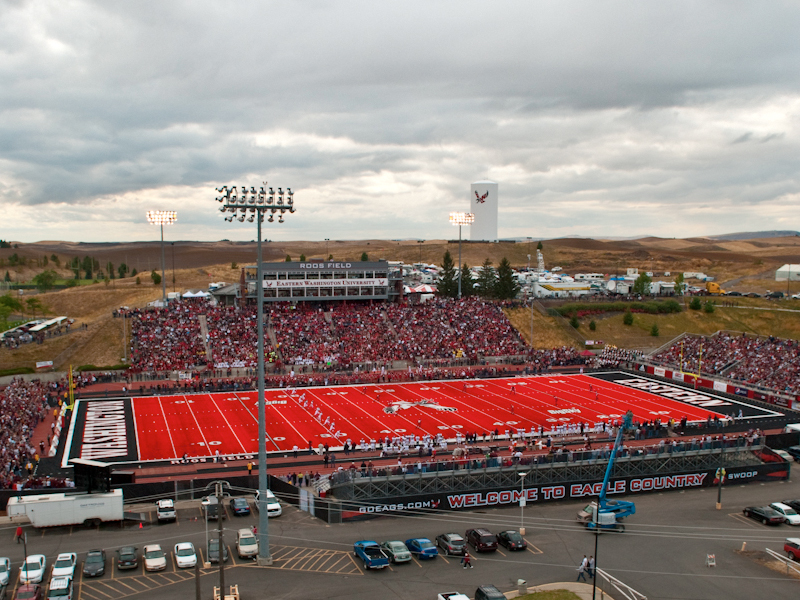
Roos Field

Eastern Washington University offers club, intramural, and varsity sports. Its twelve varsity men's and women's sports teams compete in the Big Sky Conference of the National Collegiate Athletic Association's Division I as the Eastern Washington Eagles. The most prominent athletics facilities on campus are Roos Field, Reese Court, and the Jim Thorpe Fieldhouse. EWU has three national championships, including football (2010 – NCAA Div. I FCS), wrestling (1977 – NAIA) and men's cross country (1982 – NCAA Div. II).

FIRST Robotics Competition events have taken place at Reese Court, including the Pacific Northwest District Championship.

== Notable alumni ==
Eastern Washington University alumni include award-winning author Jess Walter, Seattle Seahawks wide receiver Cooper Kupp, four-time Paralympic medalist Jaleen Roberts, Grammy-nominated opera singer Thomas Hampson, and comic-book creator Todd McFarlane.
