= Richard H. Martin Jr. =

American architect

Richard H. Martin Jr. (1858–1950) was a prominent architect in the Pacific Northwest.

Martin was born in England, and emigrated to Portland, Oregon, with his parents in 1874. His father was a builder and stonemason. In 1891 he became an American citizen.

Martin worked as a draughtsman in the office of Warren Heywood Williams until Williams's death in 1888 and then went into partnership with Alexander M. Milwain.

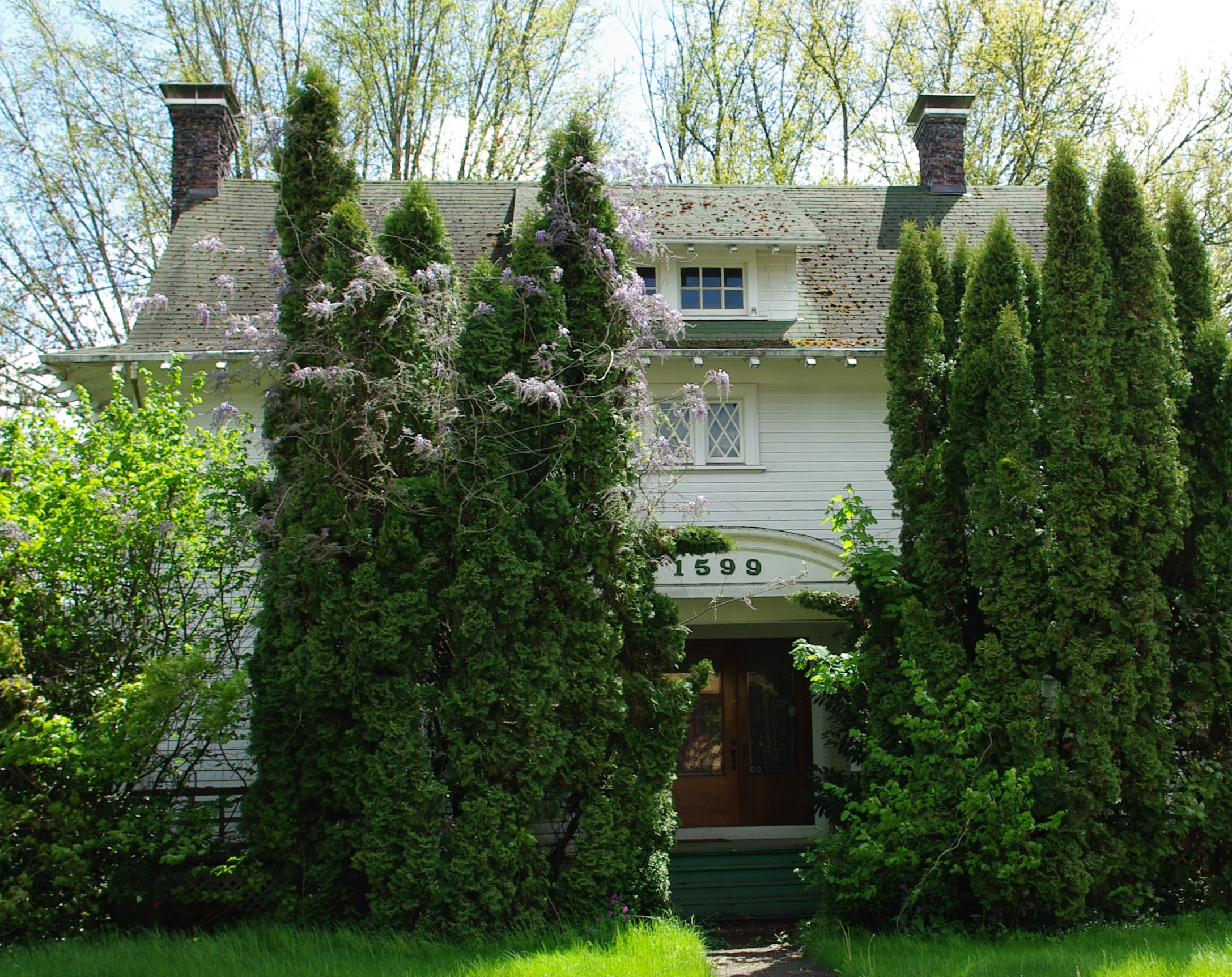
Albert S. Sholes House (1909)

He is credited with designing the Pacific Northwest Industrial Exposition Building in Portland, Oregon in 1888, although Chauncey B. Seaton is credited in various other sources as its designer. It was completed in 1890, not long after the Great Fire of Spokane. The large structure burned in 1910.

By 1889 Martin had formed a partnership with William Frederick McCaw. Frederick Manson White joined as a draughtsman a couple years later and became a full partner in McCaw, Martin & White not long after. In 1896, Martin married Hattie L. Houghton, and their son, Richard L. Martin, was born in 1899.

== Works ==
Selected works include (with attribution if shared):

- Pacific Northwest Industrial Exposition Building (1888)
- The Dekum (1891), 519 SW 3rd St., Portland, OR (McCaw, Martin & White), NRHP-listed
- First Regiment Armory Annex (1891), 123 NW Eleventh Ave., Portland, OR (McCaw & Martin), NRHP-listed
- West Hall (1891), 5000 N. Willamette Blvd., Portland, OR (McCaw, Martin & White), NRHP-listed
- Portland Scottish Rite Cathedral (1902), 1512 SW Morrison St., Portland, OR, Oregon Historic Sites Database
- Albert S. Sholes House (1909) at 1599 S. Alpine Street, Cornelius, Oregon, NRHP-listed
