= Albert S. Sholes House =

Historic house in Oregon, United States

- U.S. National Register of Historic Places
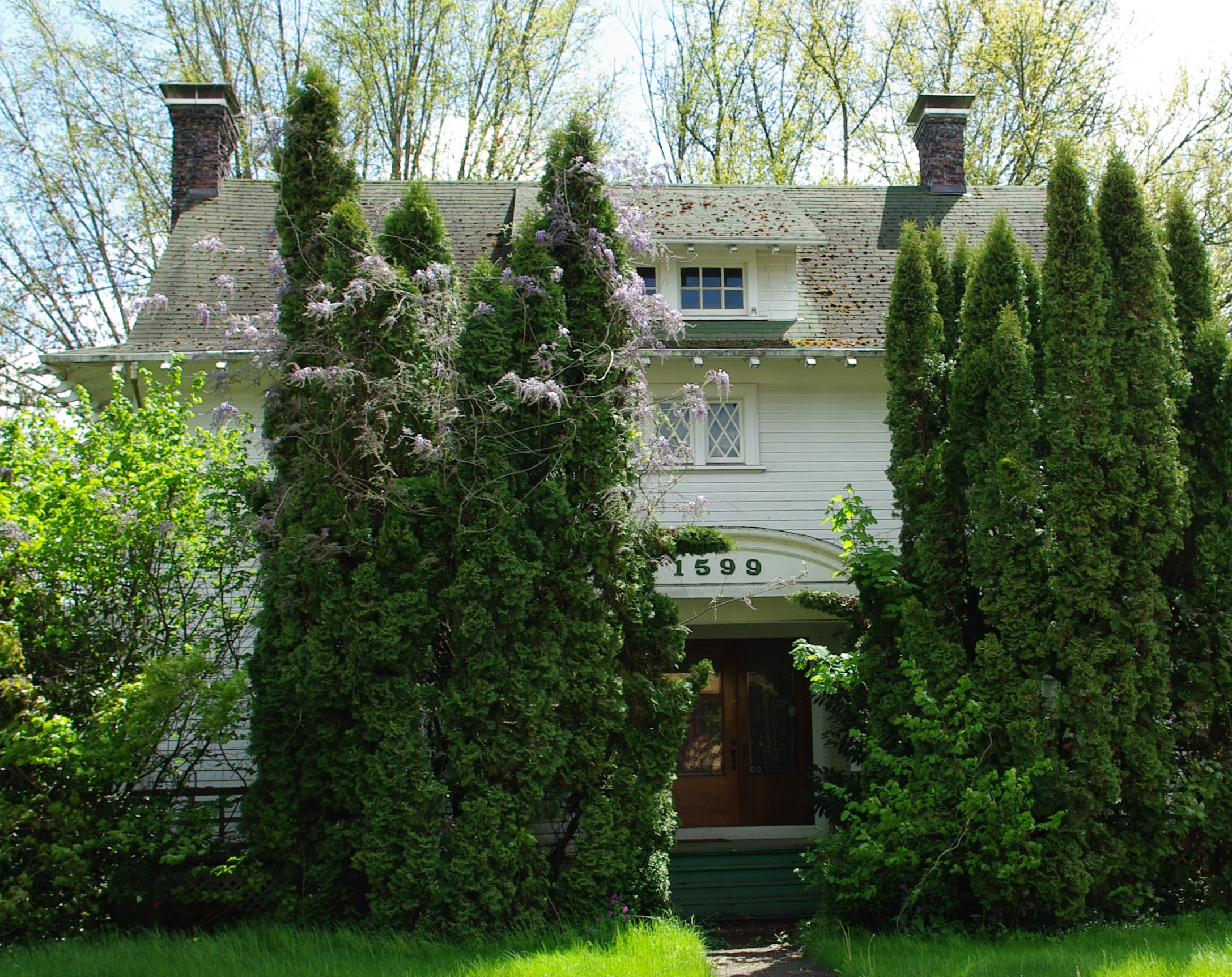
- The house in 2009

- Location within Oregon Location within the United States
- Location: 1599 S Alpine Street, Cornelius, Oregon
- Coordinates: 45°31′08″N 123°03′08″W
- Built: 1909
- Architect: Richard Martin Jr.
- Architectural style: Craftsman / Bungalow
- NRHP reference No.: 82003755
- Added to NRHP: September 2, 1982

The Albert S. Sholes House, located in Cornelius, Oregon, is a house listed on the National Register of Historic Places (NRHP). Built in 1909, the bungalow was designed by Richard Martin Jr. for banker Albert Sholes.

== History ==
Albert Seymour Sholes was born in 1844 in Michigan and moved to Oregon in 1901. He settled in Portland, then moved to Hillsboro in 1903; there, he was a banker with Edward Schulmerich at the Hillsboro Commercial Bank. Schulmerich's home in Hillsboro is also listed on the National Register of Historic Places. Sholes started buying into the Cornelius State Bank in 1906; he would later own a majority share.

In 1909, he had a new home built in Cornelius on Alpine Street, just south of the railroad tracks. He platted 91 lots on his property in the city's Pleasant View Addition, and retained three on the eastern end at 16th Street for his house and two for his children. The next year, he left the Hillsboro Commercial Bank, and in 1911 he was elected mayor of Cornelius. During his single term he helped to found the fire department. His son Frank H. also served as mayor from 1915 to 1918 and in 1929.

Albert Sholes died in 1931, and businessman Percy Hillis bought the home in 1933. Hillies and his family kept the home into the 1960s, leaving it in its original condition. Joe and Katherine Redwine acquired the house in 1967. On September 2, 1982, the structure was added to the National Register of Historic Places. By 2005 the home was owned by Mark Dakins.

== Details ==
The architect for the house was Richard Martin Jr., who helped design other buildings such as the now Waldschmidt Hall at the University of Portland. He designed a 2 1/2-story Craftsman Bungalow with a Georgian Colonial facade. Inside, there is a central entry with stairs that the entire home is focused upon. The exterior includes porches and a shed-roofed dormer.

== See also ==
- National Register of Historic Places listings in Washington County, Oregon
