= The Armory (Portland, Oregon) =

Historic building in Portland, Oregon, U.S.

- U.S. National Register of Historic Places
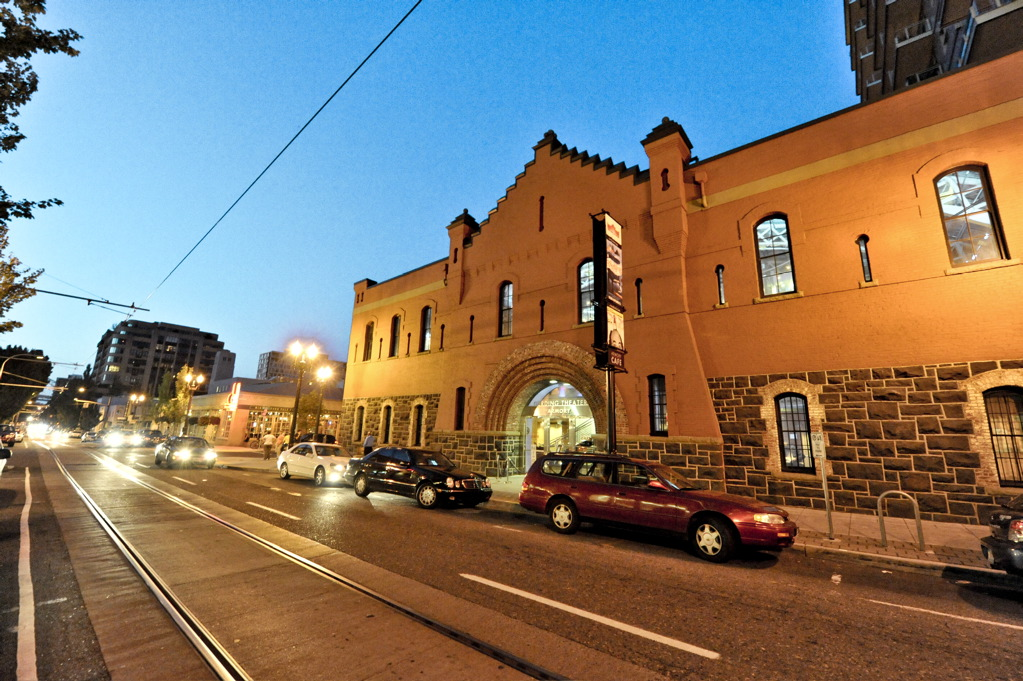
- The Armory at dusk

- Location within Portland, Oregon
- Location: 128 NW 11th Avenue; Portland, Oregon
- Coordinates: 45°31′27″N 122°40′54″W
- Area: less than one acre
- Built: 1891
- Architect: McCaw and Martin
- Architectural style: Romanesque Revival
- NRHP reference No.: 00001017
- Added to NRHP: August 31, 2000

The Armory, historically known as the First Regiment Armory Annex, and home to Portland Center Stage at The Armory, is a historic building with two theaters and is located in Portland, Oregon, United States. It was built in 1891 by Multnomah County to house the Oregon National Guard. In 2000, it was added to the National Register of Historic Places.

== Construction ==
In the late 19th century, anti-Chinese sentiment, particularly along the West Coast of the United States, had led to anti-Chinese violence in Oregon and Washington. After violence turned to riot in some cases (such as in Seattle), the State of Oregon authorized construction of armories so that National Guard troops could drill, in an effort to prevent or control potential riots.

The First Regiment Armory in Portland was completed in 1888, but was immediately deemed too small, and so an Annex was commissioned to give troops stationed there more space for maneuvers. Amenities included an underground firing range. Constructed in 1891, the annex was built in the Romanesque Revival style that was popular from 1880 to 1890 and is identified by massive stone cladding and semi-circular arcades. McCaw and Martin featured many Northwest quarry materials in the design. The annex is also an example of Castellated architecture. The fortress-like structure has a recessed arched entrance flanked by turrets above. The turrets have crenelated parapets and loophole vertical gun slots.

== Uses ==
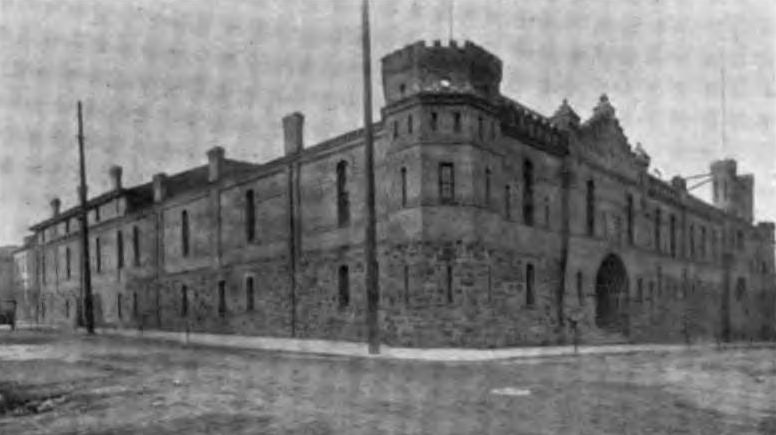
The Armory circa 1914

Constructed with a truss system with no supporting pillars to block views or impede movement, the building was one of the few Portland buildings in the early 20th century that could handle large crowds. As a result, the building hosted exhibitions of early motion picture machines, conventions, reunions, recitals, concerts, and speeches by presidents Theodore Roosevelt, William Howard Taft, and Woodrow Wilson. In 1918, the new Municipal Auditorium (now called Keller Auditorium), designed with superior acoustics and comfortable seating, supplanted the Armory for concerts and speeches, though amateur boxing events were still held at the Armory.

In 1928, the Portland fire marshal declared the building to be a fire hazard; nonetheless, the building continued to be used. From 1946 to 1948, the Armory was home to the Portland Indians of the Pacific Coast Professional Basketball League. In 1948, the building was used to take in refugees of the Vanport Flood which destroyed the town of Vanport in 1948.

In 1968, the Blitz-Weinhard Brewing Company purchased the entire complex, demolishing the original Armory for a parking lot and using the Annex as a warehouse.

== Present use ==
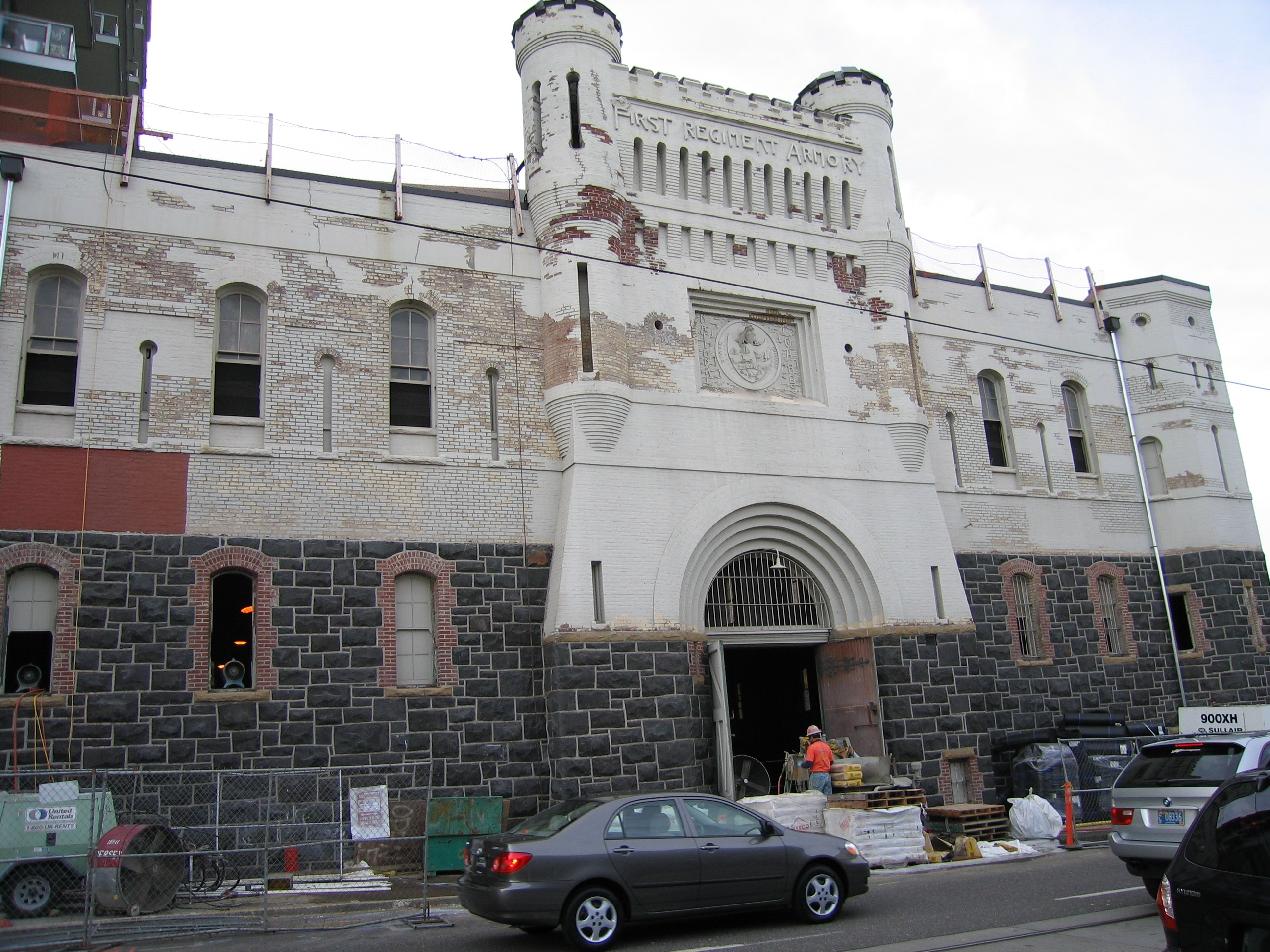
Portland Armory during renovation

The Armory was the last piece of property in Portland's Pearl District Brewery Blocks to be redeveloped. The Portland development firm Gerding Edlen had redeveloped surrounding properties utilizing sustainable building practices and, when they bought the Armory complex in 2000, they pledged to maintain the historical character of the building while redeveloping the property.

The Armory now contains the 590-seat U.S. Bank Main Stage and 190-seat Ellyn Bye Studio. The reinvention of the building as an arts center was contemplated as early as 2002. The renovation cost $36.1 million.

== See also ==
- Powell's Books
- Weinhard Brewery Complex
- Portland Center Stage
