= Portland Center Stage =

Theatrical company in Portland, Oregon

Portland Center Stage at The Armory
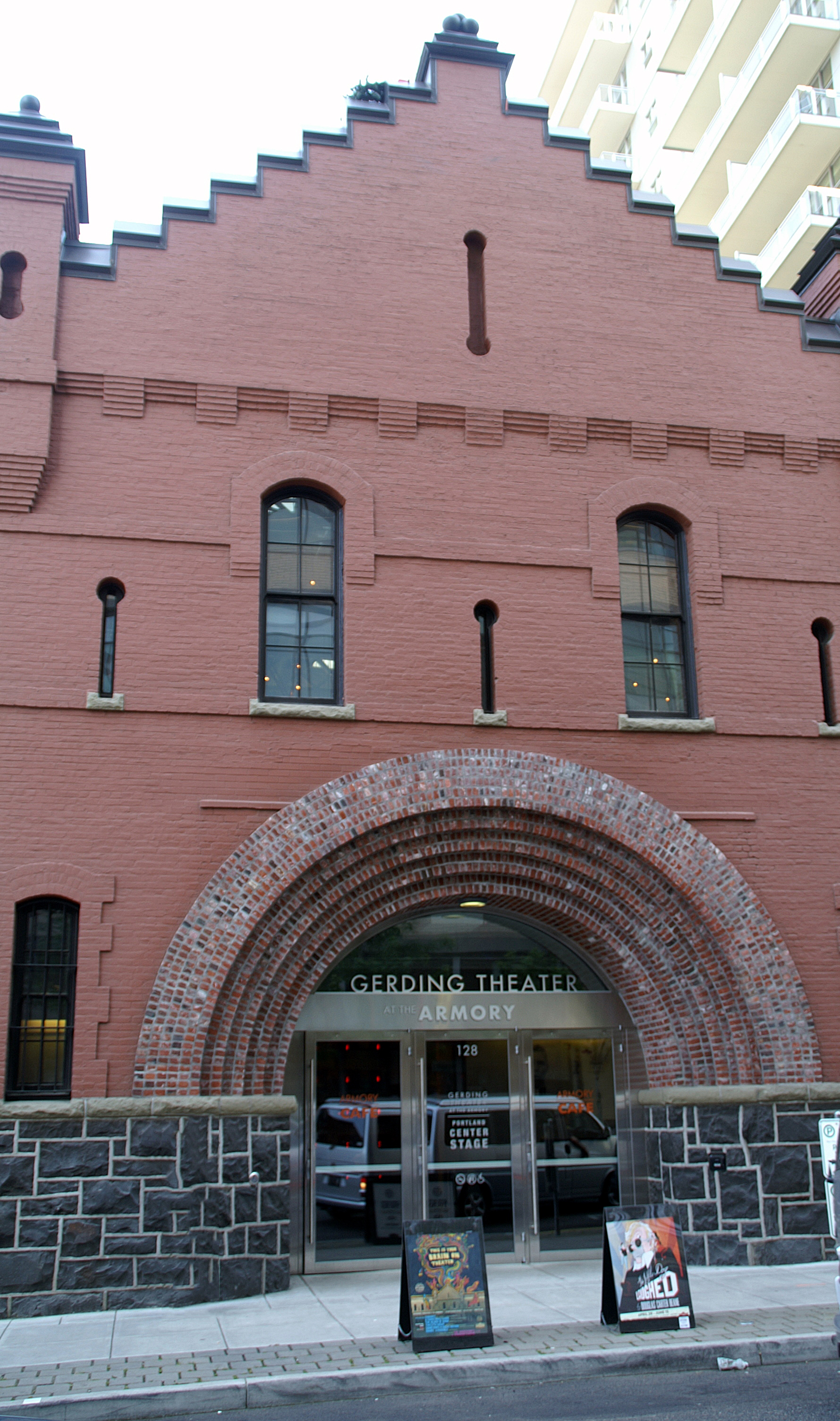
- The Armory
- Abbreviation: PCS
- Formation: November 12, 1988
- Type: Theatre company
- Purpose: Theatrical productions in Portland, Oregon
- Location: Portland Center Stage at The Armory
- Members: Portland, Oregon
- Official language: English
- Artistic Director: Marissa Wolf
- Main organ: Board of Directors
- Affiliations: League of Regional Theatres, Actors' Equity Association, Theatre Communications Group
- Website: Portland Center Stage at The Armory

Portland Center Stage at The Armory is a theater company based in Portland, Oregon, United States. Theater productions are presented at The Armory in Portland's Pearl District. Portland Center Stage at The Armory was founded in 1988 as the northern sibling of the Oregon Shakespeare Festival in Ashland, Oregon. It became an independent theater in 1993 and in 1994 Elizabeth Huddle became producing artistic director. Chris Coleman took over in 2000 as the company's fourth artistic director. In 2018, Marissa Wolf was named the fifth artistic director and Cynthia Fuhrman named Managing Director.

The company began a capital campaign in 2004, and in 2006 moved into The Armory, which includes two theaters, a bar and restaurant, a costume shop, production facilities and office space. Portland Center Stage at The Armory produces at least ten productions annually between September and June, and productions include musicals, classical, contemporary and premiere pieces. Portland Center Stage at The Armory has received positive commentary in regional guidebooks including Best Places Northwest, Best Places Portland and Moon Handbooks Oregon.

== History ==
=== 1988–2000 ===
Portland Center Stage was founded in 1988, and was the "northern sibling" of the Oregon Shakespeare Festival (OSF) in Ashland, Oregon, and continued as a branch of OSF until 1994. The company was originally known as "Oregon Shakespeare Festival Portland". Its first production was Heartbreak House. Dennis Bigelow was PCS's first artistic director and was let go by the OSF in 1992. A two-year transitional process began in 1993, during which the OSF maintained a supervisory role over PCS. The Oregonian reported that the OSF's artistic director Henry Woronicz "couldn't figure out how to integrate the two closely enough for his liking, and he was unwilling to have Portland go its own way without supervision".

The advisory board for Oregon Shakespeare Festival Portland was reformulated as the board of directors of the PCS, and Elizabeth Huddle was hired in May 1994 as the producing artistic director. Huddle had previously served on the PCS's search committee for a new artistic director, but decided to put her name in for consideration. In 1994 the PCS had a budget of US$2.2 million, and over 11,000 subscribers.

In May 1995 the company's financial numbers for its transitional 1994–1995 period with its new artistic director were reported to be a deficit of $240,000. The company experienced what The Oregonian described as a "jarring divorce" from the OSF. Huddle had been on the 1991 search committee for the OSF's artistic director Henry Woronicz, but he suddenly announced his resignation in June 1995 effective the following October citing "personal reasons". Huddle and the rest of the theater community were surprised by Woronicz's resignation. In 2000 PCS board president Julie Vigeland commented to The Seattle Times that after separating from OSF "it was a real challenge to form our own identity", but that Huddle "did a wonderful job helping us do that for the last six years".

=== 2000–present ===
Its fourth artistic director Chris Coleman took over in May 2000, and recruited experienced actors to the company. Coleman had previously co-founded Actor's Express in Atlanta, Georgia, and was the artistic director there. Coleman initially signed on for a three-year contract. Before Coleman began as artistic director with PCS, the company was already the largest live theater production company in Portland. However, the organization was facing sporadic attendance at performances as well as financial difficulties, with a deficit at the end of 1999 of $700,000. In 2000 PCS had a deficit of $880,000 and a base of 10,000 subscribers. The financial position of the company later stabilized, and Coleman had a 2000 budget of $3.2 million to work with when he came on. A 2003 consultant's report, however, found that PCS relied more heavily on gifts and grants to fund its operations than its peers around the country.

Coleman hired the Portland company Sandstrom Design to help with marketing. Sandstrom helped to improve the promotional materials of the organization, while Portland Center Stage modified the nature and style of its performances. Sandstrom Design produced a 56-page flyer that showed the performance schedule for the 2003–2004 season which was mailed to subscribers, potential customers, handed out at performances and placed around town. The promotional campaign stressed the unique qualities of a live theater performance as entertainment over television and film. PCS's productions were presented in the Winningstad and Newmark theatres in Portland through the 2005–2006 season. Portland Center Stage moved to the new Gerding Theater at the Armory beginning with the 2006–2007 season.

Portland Center Stage began a $32.9 million capital campaign in 2004, with the goal of building a new theater complex in The Armory, a historic building in Portland. The company began usage of The Armory in September 2006. PCS received $150,000 from the United States Department of Housing and Urban Development in September 2006 for "renovations and upgrades to its facility", and an additional $500,000 as part of the "Portland Center Stage Armory Theater Energy Conservation Project".

As of 2023, the theater is being run by Artistic Director Marissa Wolf and Managing Director Liam Kaas-Lentz. During the 2020 shut down, Portland Center Stage presented several virtual productions ranging from new works created specifically for the medium, to classic plays performed as virtual staged readings. In 2021, PCS returned to in person productions.

The theater facilities at The Armory include the 590-seat U.S. Bank Main Stage theater, the 199-seat Ellyn Bye Studio (a flexible black box theater), administrative offices, the Vigeland Rehearsal Hall and a costume shop. Ten or more productions are performed annually, from September through June. The company's productions include contemporary, classical pieces and modern premieres, in addition to a summer playwrights festival, JAW (previously known as Just Add Water/West). PCS has approximately 9,000 subscribers and an annual audience of over 150,000.

== Productions ==
When Elizabeth Huddle became producing artistic director in 1994, a production schedule had already been set by the OSF's Pat Patton. Huddle made changes to her first season's schedule and decided to direct the first play of the season Arms and the Man, instead of the previously scheduled play Jean Anouilh's translation of Sophocles' Antigone. Portland Center Stage was nominated for "Best Production" in the 1994–95 Drammy Awards which recognize excellence in Portland theater, for Arms and the Man.

Huddle was artistic director for the world premiere of the play Comfort and Joy: A Play in Two Acts, which premiered at PCS on December 2, 1995. Huddle had commissioned playwright Jack Heifner to write Comfort and Joy, which was the first time that Portland Center Stage had ever produced a new play. Huddle ended her time with the Portland Center Stage company in January 2000. One of Huddle's final productions with PCS was A Christmas Carol, and her final production with the company was Bus Stop.

Chris Coleman's first production after signing on with PCS in 2000 was the play The Devils by Elizabeth Egloff, based on the novel of the same name by Fyodor Dostoevsky. Theater critic Misha Berson of The Seattle Times described Coleman's choice as "an especially audacious departure for Portland Center Stage", though reviews in Portland media were mixed, it received a positive review in The Oregonian and from audience feedback. Other productions in the 2000–2001 season included Martin McDonagh's Irish comedy, The Cripple of Inishmaan, A Christmas Carol, Patrick Marber's Closer, and adaptation of Antigone, and the Northwest premiere of A New Brain by William Finn.

Coleman opened the 2006, 2007 and 2008 seasons at PCS with musicals. He opened the 2006 season with West Side Story, and the 2007 season with Cabaret. Other productions in the 2007–2008 season included Doubt, a Parable, Twelfth Night, and Sometimes a Great Notion. PCS received a total of 12 awards at the 29th annual Drammy Awards in June 2008, including "Outstanding Production" for Twelfth Night. Coleman opened the 2008–2009 season with Guys and Dolls, which The Oregonian and Willamette Week described as a timely choice in light of the Great Recession.

== Reception ==
In her 2004 guide Best Places Northwest Giselle Smith wrote that PCS "offers excellent production values, whatever the play". In his 2004 book Best Places Portland, author John Gottberg wrote positively of Portland Center Stage, commenting: "Portland's leading professional theater company is on a par with the country's best regional theaters." The 2007 guidebook Moon Handbooks Oregon notes that the company: "produces innovative and sometimes daring productions".

== See also ==
- Culture of Portland, Oregon
