= First Presbyterian Church (Portland, Oregon) =

Historic church in Portland, Oregon, U.S.

- First Presbyterian Church of Portland
- U.S. National Register of Historic Places
- Portland Historic Landmark
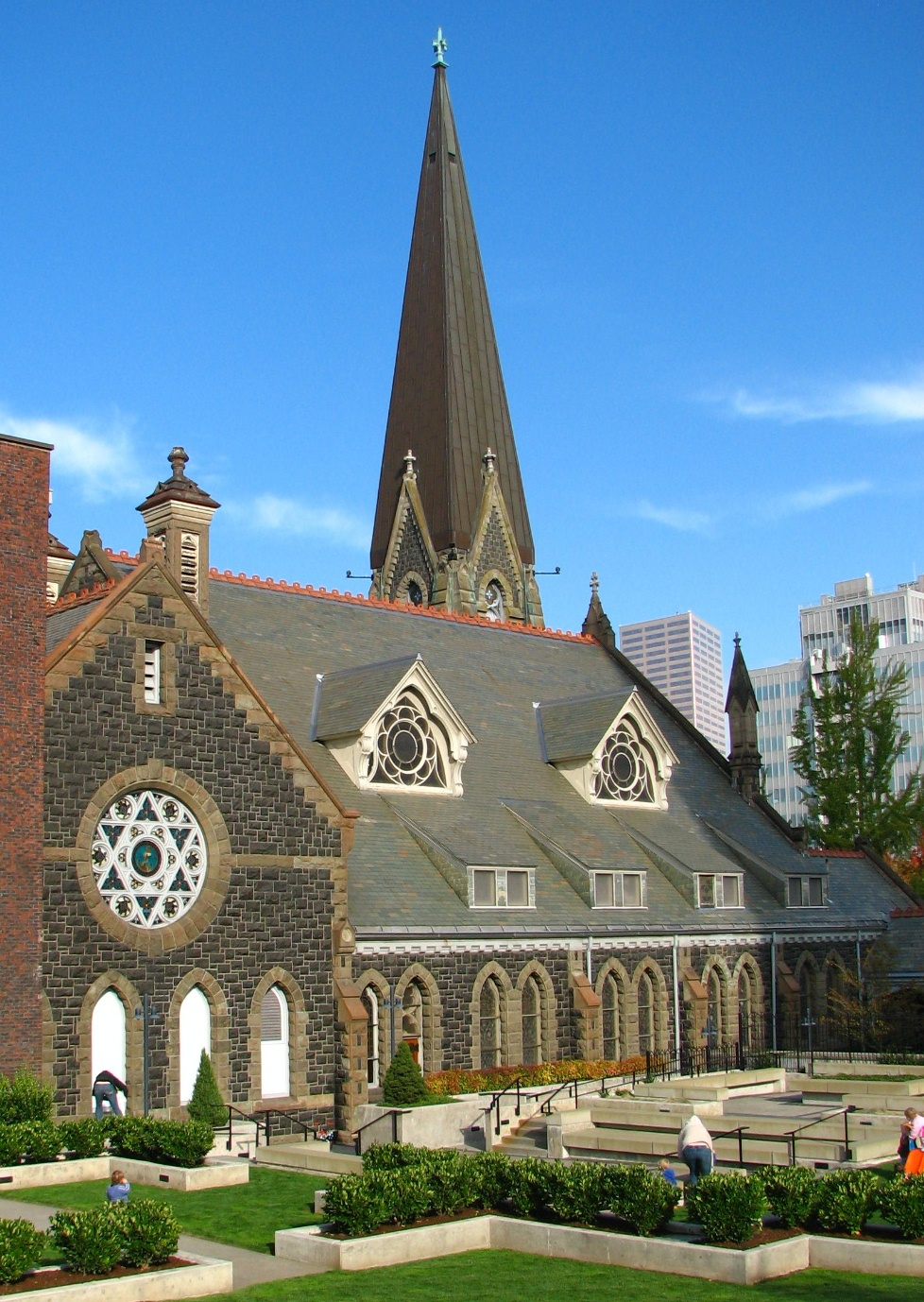
- First Presbyterian Church in 2008. The chapel is at left and the main sanctuary in the center.

- Location within Portland, Oregon Location within Oregon Location within the United States
- Location: 1200 SW Alder Street; Portland, Oregon
- Coordinates: 45°31′16″N 122°41′03″W
- Area: 0.2 acres (0.081 ha)
- Built: 1886–1890
- Architect: William F. McCaw, et al.
- Architectural style: Gothic, High Victorian Gothic
- NRHP reference No.: 74002294
- Added to NRHP: December 19, 1974

The First Presbyterian Church is a church building located in downtown Portland, Oregon, that is listed on the National Register of Historic Places. Construction began in 1886 and was completed in 1890. The building has been called "one of the finest examples" of High Victorian Gothic architecture in the state of Oregon. It includes stained-glass windows made by Portland's Povey Brothers Art Glass Works and a church bell cast with bronze from captured Civil War cannons.

== Congregation history ==
As a congregation, what is now known as the First Presbyterian Church of Portland was organized on January 1, 1854, and was only the third Presbyterian church in the Oregon Territory. With a congregation numbering just twelve members initially, services were originally held in private homes, twice a month. For the first year, Reverend J. L. Yantis journeyed on horseback to Portland from Calapooia, Oregon (2 miles east of Shedd), 80 miles to the south. Services were later held at a larger venue, the Canton House—a public meeting place at Front and Washington streets that was later known as the Pioneer Hotel, the Lincoln House and the American Exchange building.

By 1860, the congregation had grown to 87 members, and fundraising for a permanent church building began. Property was purchased in 1862. The congregation's first permanent building was completed in 1864, at 3rd and Washington streets, (Note: Some sources give the location incorrectly, as 3rd and Morrison streets or 31st and Washington streets.) and was dedicated on May 22. It included the first pipe organ in Portland. A 1,052-pound bell was donated by Caroline E. Jagger Corbett, wife of Senator Henry W. Corbett. It was made by Meneely & Company (of Troy, New York) from bronze Civil War cannons. A 1987 article in The Oregonian said that in 1865, the bell "rang out the news that the Civil War had ended. Five days later, it tolled for President Lincoln's death."

The church society was incorporated as "the First Presbyterian Church and Society of the City of Portland" in 1865, by members William S. Ladd, John C. Ainsworth, O.P.S. Plummer and others.

As the congregation continued to grow, First Presbyterian counted many prominent Portlanders among its members, including Henry W. Corbett, William S. Ladd, John C. Ainsworth, and Jacob Kamm.

By the 1880s the congregation had grown to 900 members, and it was decided that a new, larger building was needed. In 1883, a parcel of more than a quarter-block was purchased at 12th and Alder streets for the new church, and later an adjacent property at 13th and Alder was purchased for a parsonage. Architect William F. McCaw was hired to design the new building, and his plans were approved in July 1886.

According to The Oregon Encyclopedia, in the 1920s First Presbyterian Church was "among the ten largest [Presbyterian] congregations in the United States." In 1929, membership stood at 2,802. In 1997, there were 1,100 members.

== Building ==
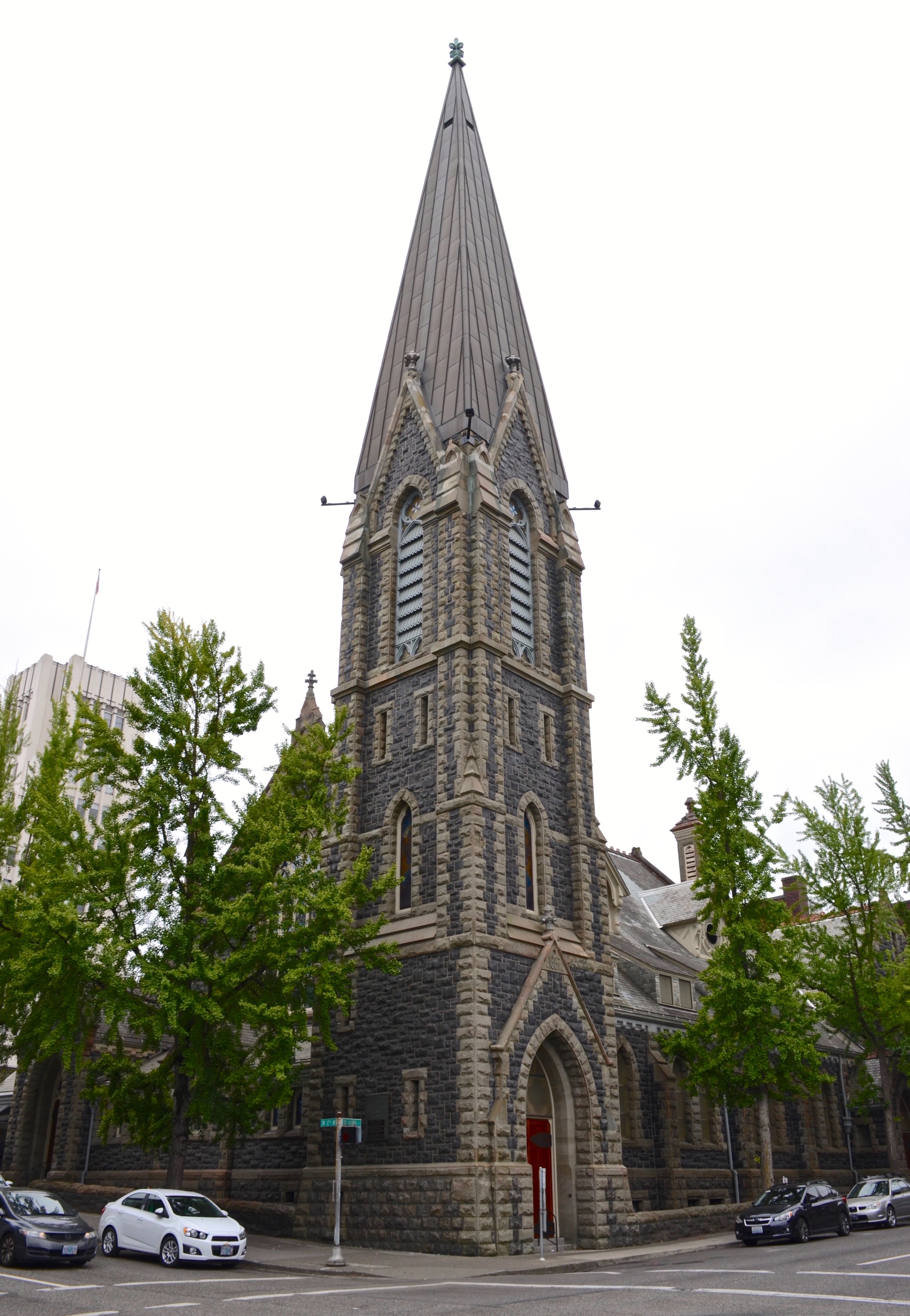
Viewed from the east-northeast, intersection of 12th & Alder, in 2017

Construction of the existing building began in 1886. The general contractor was John C. Robertson. By May 1887, the foundation had been completed, and the cornerstone was laid in a ceremony on May 2 of that year. The chapel was finished in May 1889, in the new building's west end, and services began being held there as work continued on the main auditorium. Construction of the latter was completed in 1890, and the first public worship service in the new building's main auditorium was held on October 20, 1890. The total construction cost was approximately $120,000 (equivalent to $4.3 million in 2025).

The church bell from the 1864 building was moved to the new building in 1889 or 1890. It remains in regular use today, being rung twice a day. A 1987 article gave its weight as 900 pounds (410 kg). The city council designated the church building a Portland Historic Landmark on April 8, 1970, and the building was listed on the National Register of Historic Places in 1974.

=== Description ===
Designed in High Victorian Gothic style, the First Presbyterian Church occupies an 85-by-140-foot (26 m × 43 m) site and includes a 185-foot-tall (56 m) spire. (Some sources give the spire's height as 180 feet.) The steeple's roof was originally covered in slate shingles, but copper cladding replaced the shingles in 1929, and a new coating of copper replaced the original in 1982.

==== Exterior ====
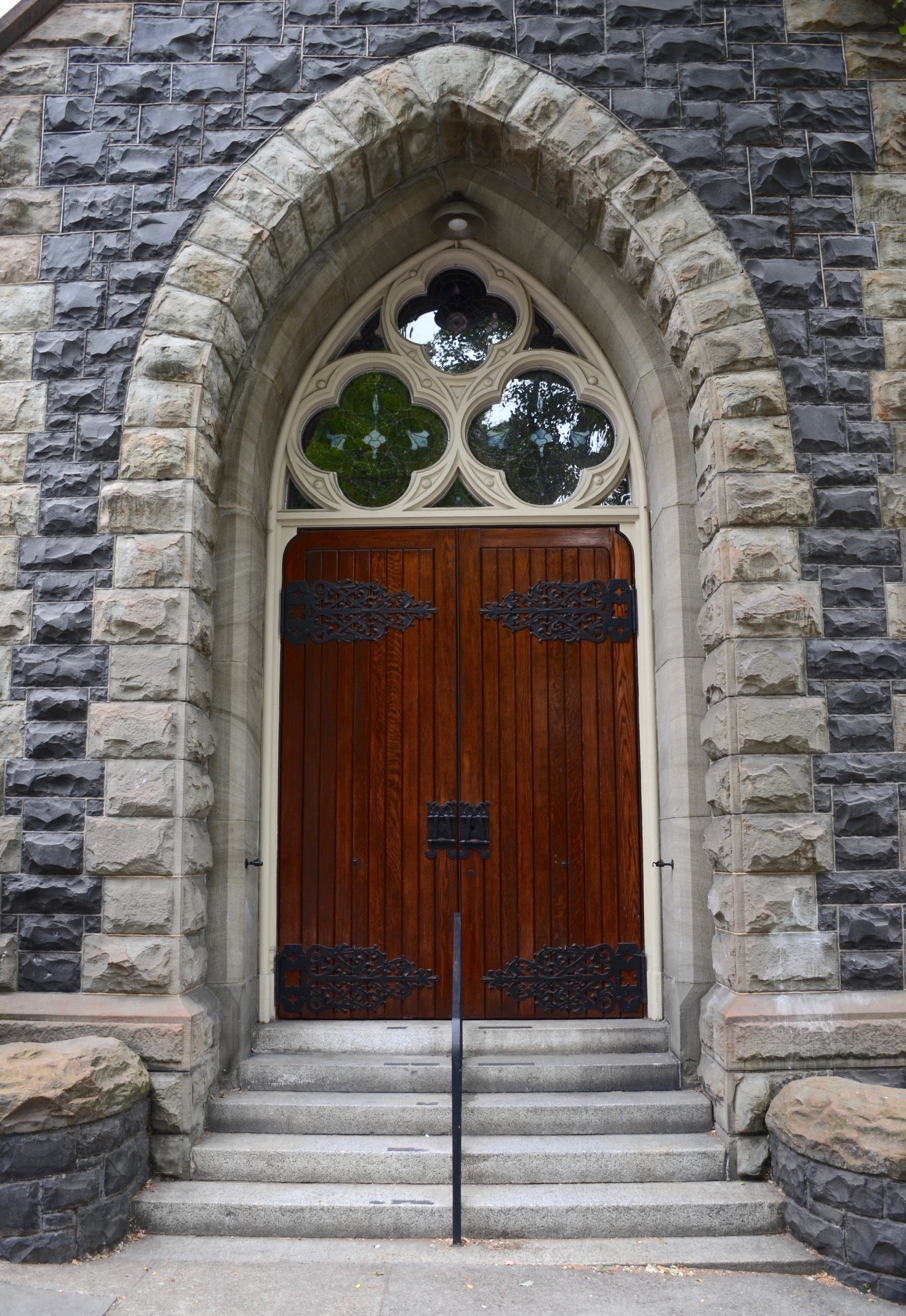
Arched entrance doorway at the southeast corner, facing 12th Avenue

The building's stone exterior is made of rusticated black basalt with lighter sandstone trim. The main portion of the building is a gable-roofed auditorium (sanctuary), the main access to which is via a narthex. There are three entrances to the narthex. Two include an arched doorway topped by a pediment, with a trio of stained-glass windows (and smaller, accent windows) above the large wooden doors. One of these entrances faces Alder Street at the base of the tower, at the building's northeast corner. The other, at the building's southeast corner (the opposite end of the narthex), faces 12th Avenue. The third narthex entrance is on the south side of the building and is fitted with a porte-cochère. An additional entrance on the building's north side is located immediately west of the sanctuary and east of the chapel, and is positioned about mid-block on Alder Street. As with the other two original entrances, it has an arched and pedimented doorway with stained-glass windows above the doors. The sanctuary doors are decorated with ornamental brass overlay and leather, and the principle exterior entrance doors feature decorative brass hinges.

Positioned on each side of the main auditorium's gabled roof are two gabled dormers, each with a "rose-like" stained-glass window. A "dormer-like" pavilion (without entrance) is centered in the narthex, below the great window—the church's largest stained-glass window, in the east end of the auditorium.

At the building's west end is a chapel with a transverse gable roof (set at a right angle to the main roof and auditorium), with an arched tracery rose window of stained glass at the south end, where the pulpit is located. At the time of its completion, its floor area was 36 by 77 feet (11 m × 23 m). At its north end, on Alder Street, it has a twin-door entrance, with a narrow sandstone arch above each single door.

==== Interior ====
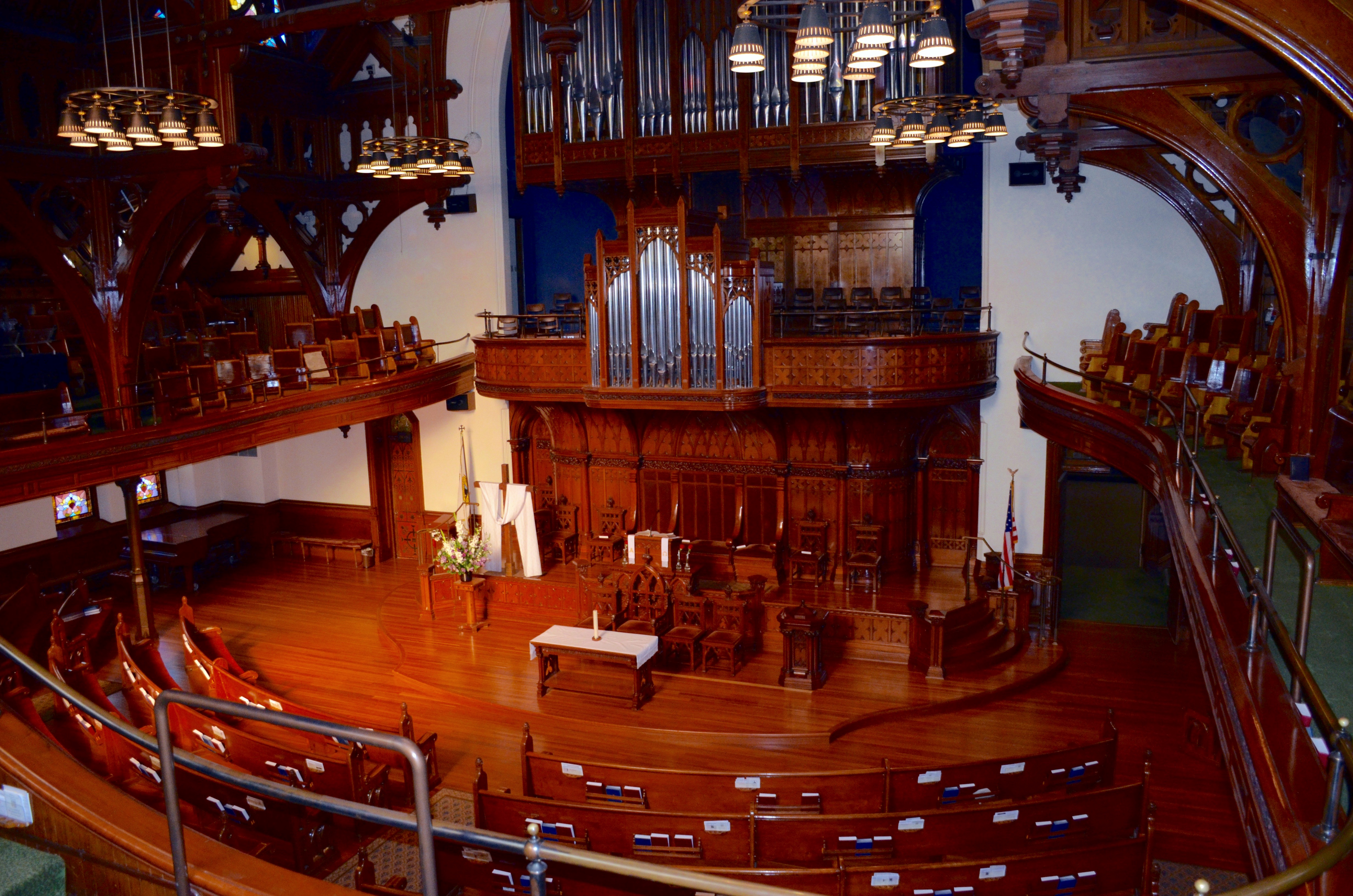
View of sanctuary from its balcony, with the pulpit in the center and pipe organ in the upper background

The main auditorium is 69.5 by 77 feet (21.2 m × 23.5 m) in size, with a 57-foot-high (17 m) ceiling. The balcony and its stairways were added in 1892. It wraps around three sides of the sanctuary and has an undulating curve in the center, at the rear (east end) of the sanctuary. The church's interior is "richly embellished". The auditorium features extensive use of cherrywood, carved by Nicholas Strahan, for the "chancel, choir loft, and organ", as well as for "the pulpit, pews, ornamentation, and balcony railings". Strahan was from Portland, but had learned his craft in England. The carvings feature Gothic motifs. The pews are laid-out in a semi-circle.

The 57-foot-high ceiling is topped by a timber roof that has "arched braces, hammerbeams, kingposts, tie beams, purlins and rafters, all carved and ornamented, and, like the rest of the woodwork, in a natural finish," as described in the building's nomination to the National Register of Historic Places.

The church's many stained-glass windows were designed by David Povey of Povey Brothers Art Glass Works, of Portland. There are stained-glass windows above every entrance, lining both sides of the sanctuary, lining the narthex, and in the four roof dormers. The dominant, largest window is at the rear of the sanctuary (its east end) and "contains a cross made of chunks of split and fractured glass, with a white dove descending on the cross." Most other windows display biblical fruit and flower motifs. The separate chapel also has Povey windows, including a large rose window at its south end. Most other windows in the chapel are now covered up, those along the west wall by the erection, in 1912, of the three-story ancillary building immediately west of the 1890 building, and those along the south wall as a result of a remodeling of the chapel's interior in 1954.

The current pipe organ is a 52-rank Jaeckel organ dating from 2000. It replaced a Moller organ that had been installed in 1929. The building's original organ was one transferred from the 1864 building at 3rd and Washington streets.

==== Window gallery ====
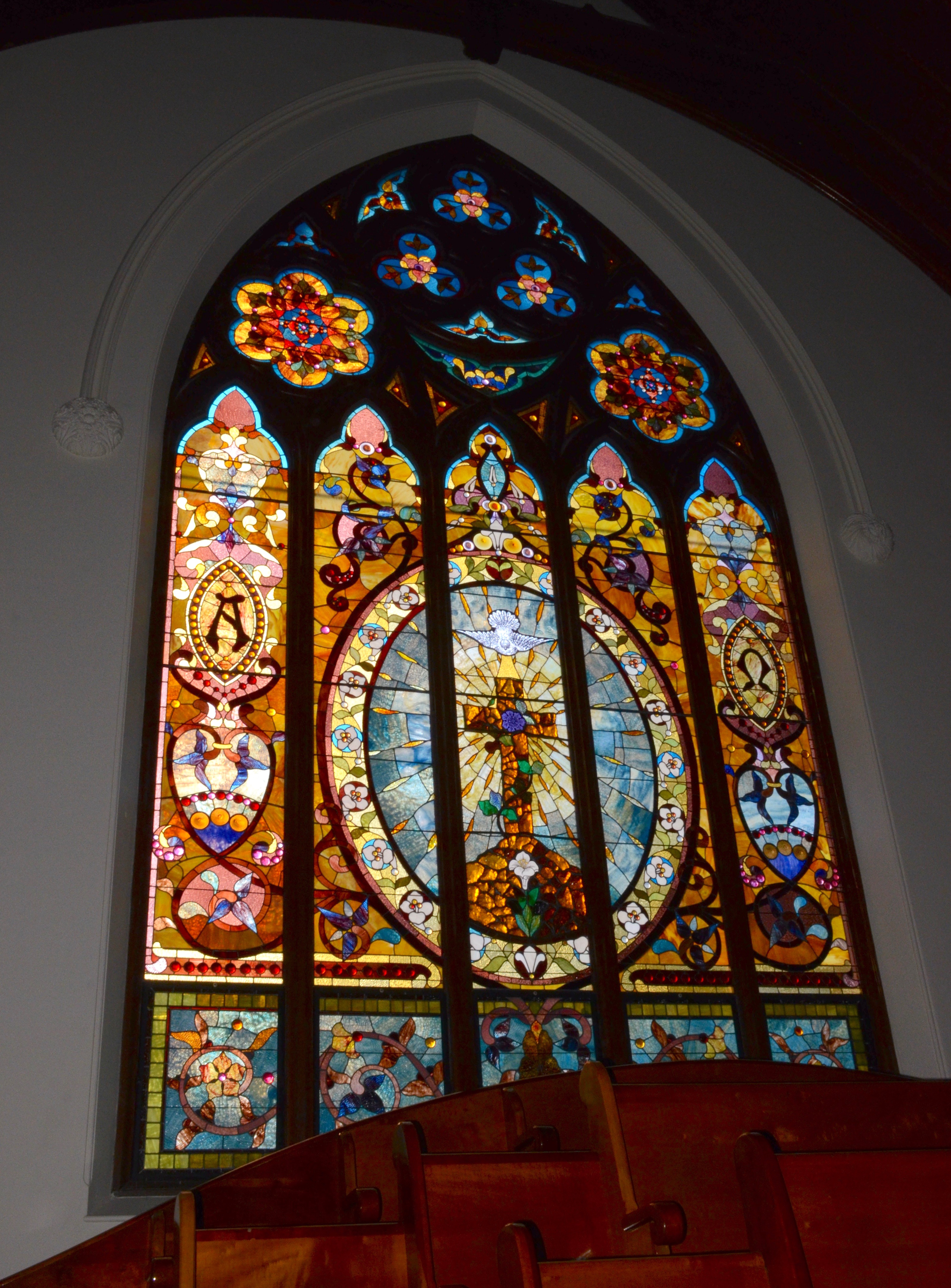
Large window in rear wall of sanctuary

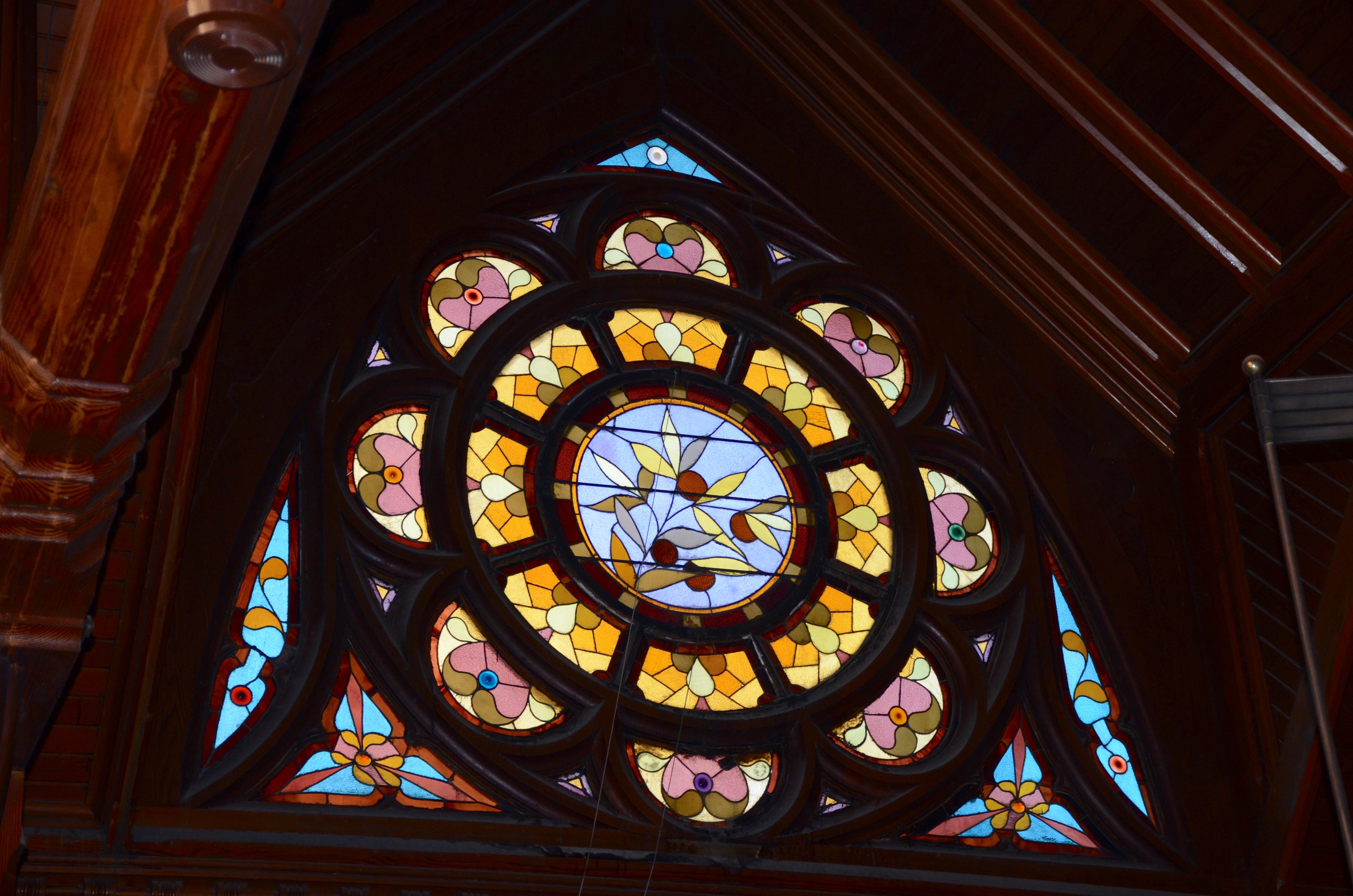
One of the four dormer windows in the roof of the main auditorium

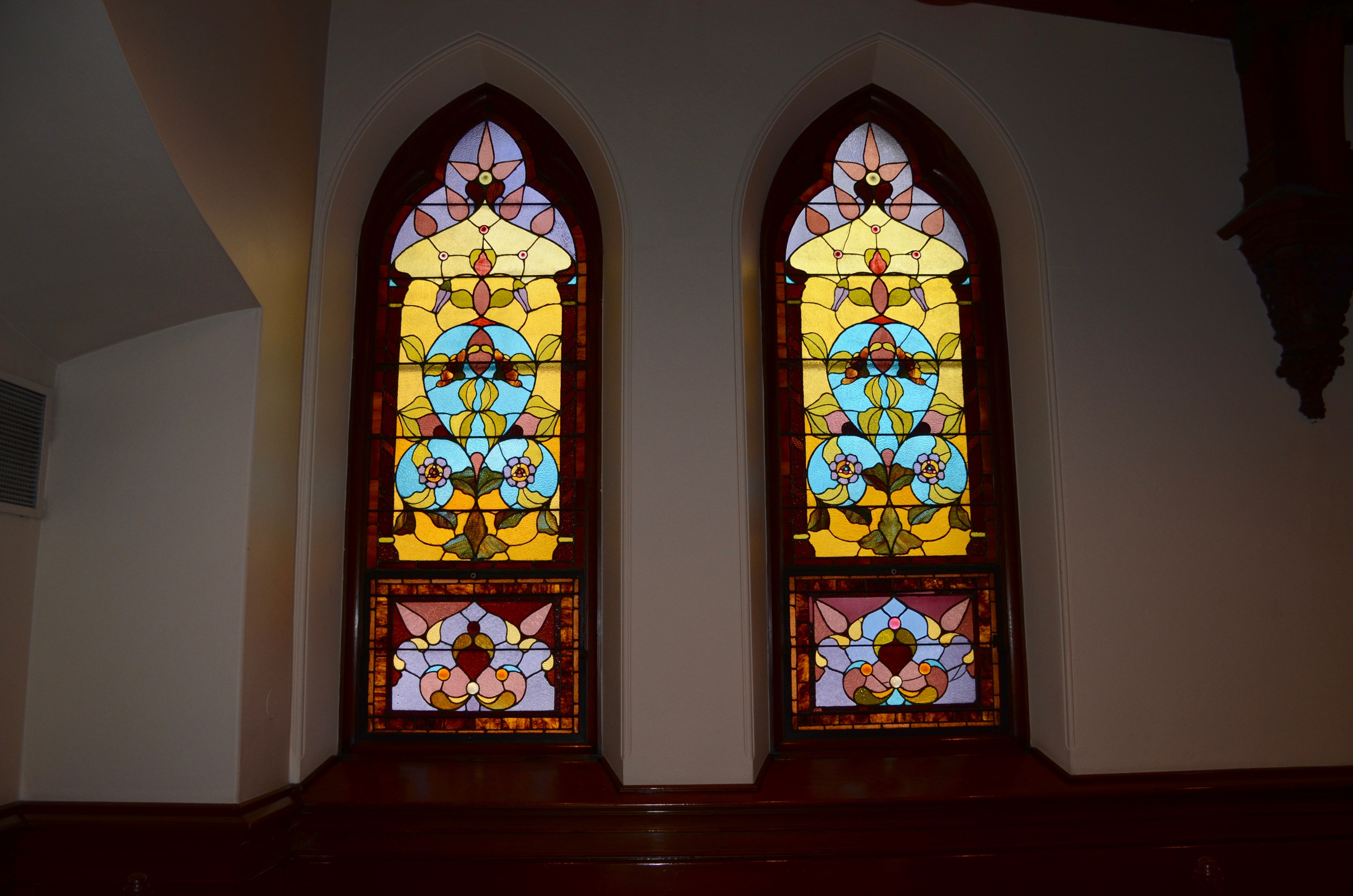
Matching pair in north side of sanctuary

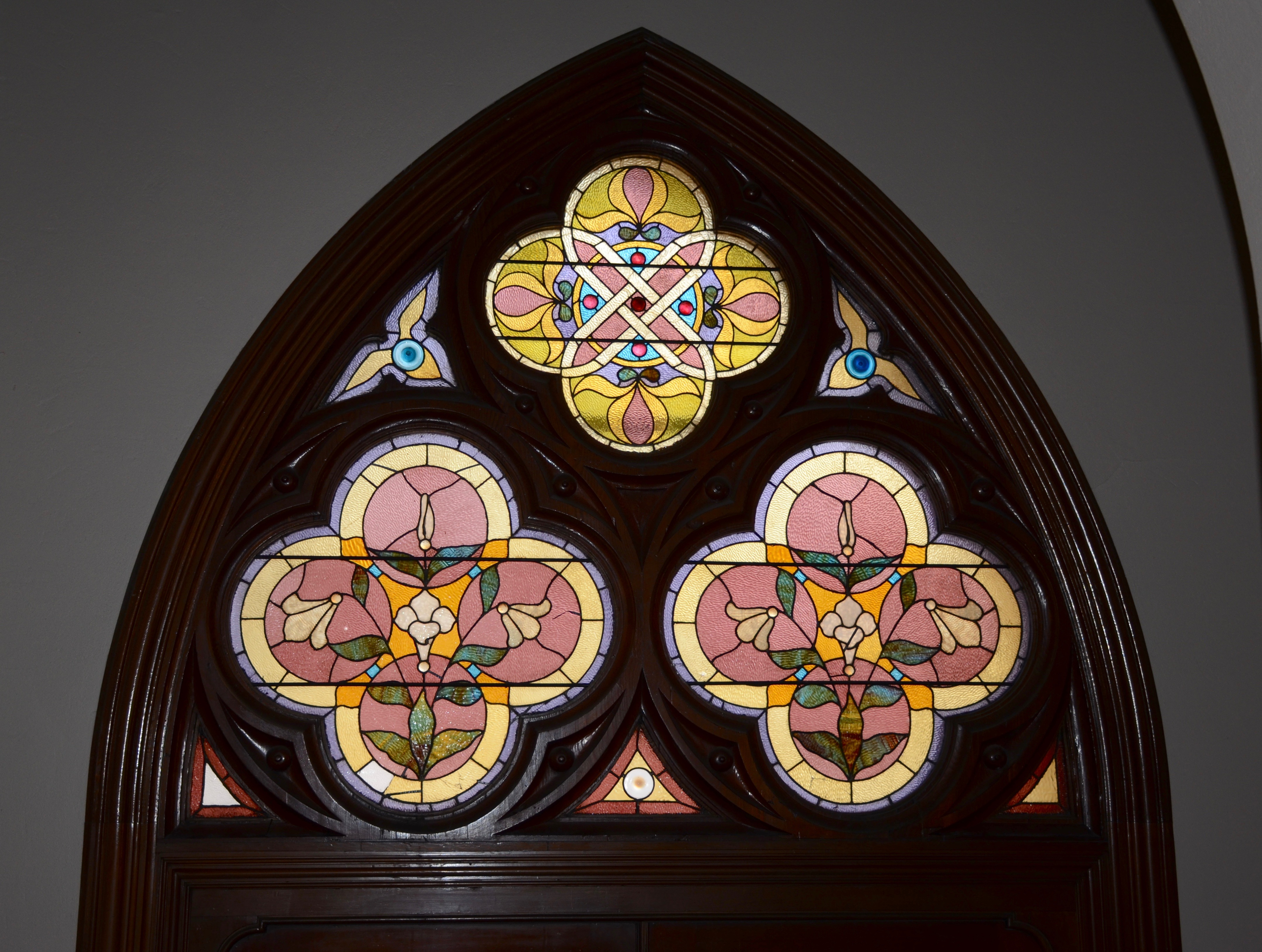
Above northern main-entrance door

== Church grounds ==
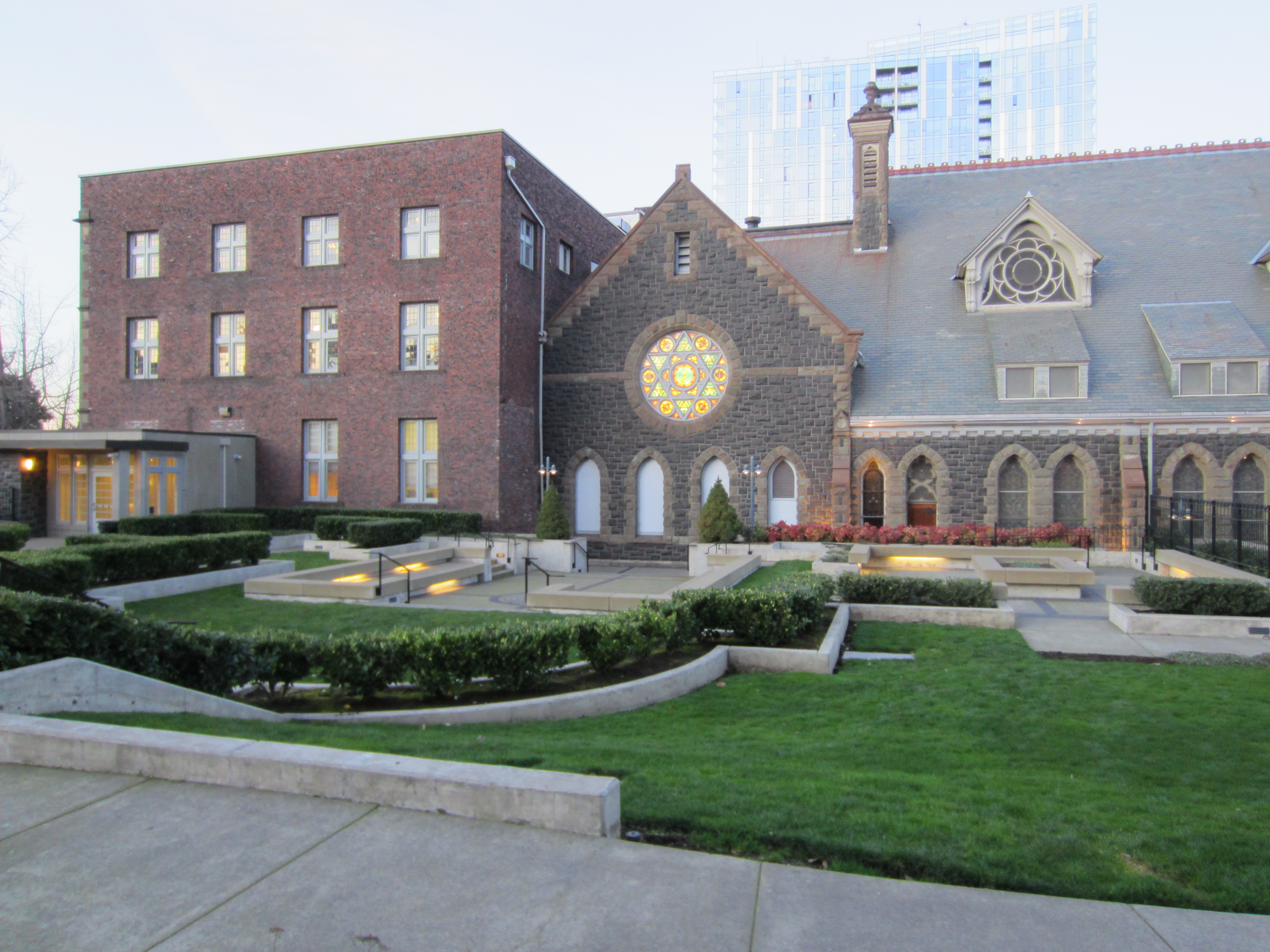
Left to right: The 1912-built ancillary building, the 1889-completed chapel and a portion of the main auditorium. In the foreground is the plaza that was created atop an underground parking garage built in 2006.

The parsonage at the southeast corner of 13th Avenue and Alder Street, immediately west of the main building, was demolished and replaced in 1911–1912 by a 3½-story, Tudor-style church hall that houses the church's administrative offices, rooms for Sunday school classes and various other facilities.

The church complex now occupies the entire city block, bounded by 12th and 13th avenues and Alder and Morrison Streets, but this was not the case before 2006. Since 1924, the Danmoore Hotel building had stood in the southeast quadrant of the block, directly abutting the porte-cochère at the church's southernmost entrance, but it was demolished in 2005 to make way for an underground parking garage. In 1988, the 118-room apartment hotel and property, which had been acquired by some of the church's members, was donated to the church, under long-term plans to relocate its residents to replacement housing (known as the Alder House apartments) located kitty-corner from the main church property, and redevelop the site. Following a 2001-launched fundraising campaign among members, plans for the redevelopment came together. The Danmoore's residents were relocated, the building was razed, and a three-story underground parking garage was built in the space, being completed in March 2006. A landscaped plaza designed by Hennebery Eddy Architects was created on top of the parking garage, at street level, and opened at the same time.

== See also ==
- Culture of Portland, Oregon
- National Register of Historic Places listings in Southwest Portland, Oregon
- Religion in Portland, Oregon
