= William Frederick McCaw =

American architect

William Frederick McCaw (1850–1923) was an Irish born Canadian-American architect who worked in Toronto early in his career, then in the Pacific Northwest of the U.S., and then other areas in the U.S. He worked in a long succession of partnerships with various architects.

McCaw was born in Dublin, Ireland and moved to Canada in 1872 settling in Toronto, but moved to Portland, Oregon in 1882.

Several of his works, alone or with shared attribution, are listed on the U.S. National Register of Historic Places (NRHP).

== Selected works ==
- First Presbyterian Church of Portland, 1200 SW Alder, Portland, OR (McCaw, William F.), NRHP-listed
- The Dekum, 519 SW 3rd St., Portland, OR (McCaw, Martin & White), NRHP-listed
- First Regiment Armory Annex, 123 NW Eleventh Ave., Portland, OR (McCaw & Martin), NRHP-listed
- West Hall, 5000 N. Willamette Blvd., Portland, OR (McCaw, Martin & White), NRHP-listed

He lived in various cities for his work including San Francisco, Houston, Texas and Muskogee, Oklahoma. He died in Fresno, California in 1923.
