= Waldschmidt Hall =

Historic building in Portland, Oregon, U.S.

- West Hall
- U.S. National Register of Historic Places
- Portland Historic Landmark
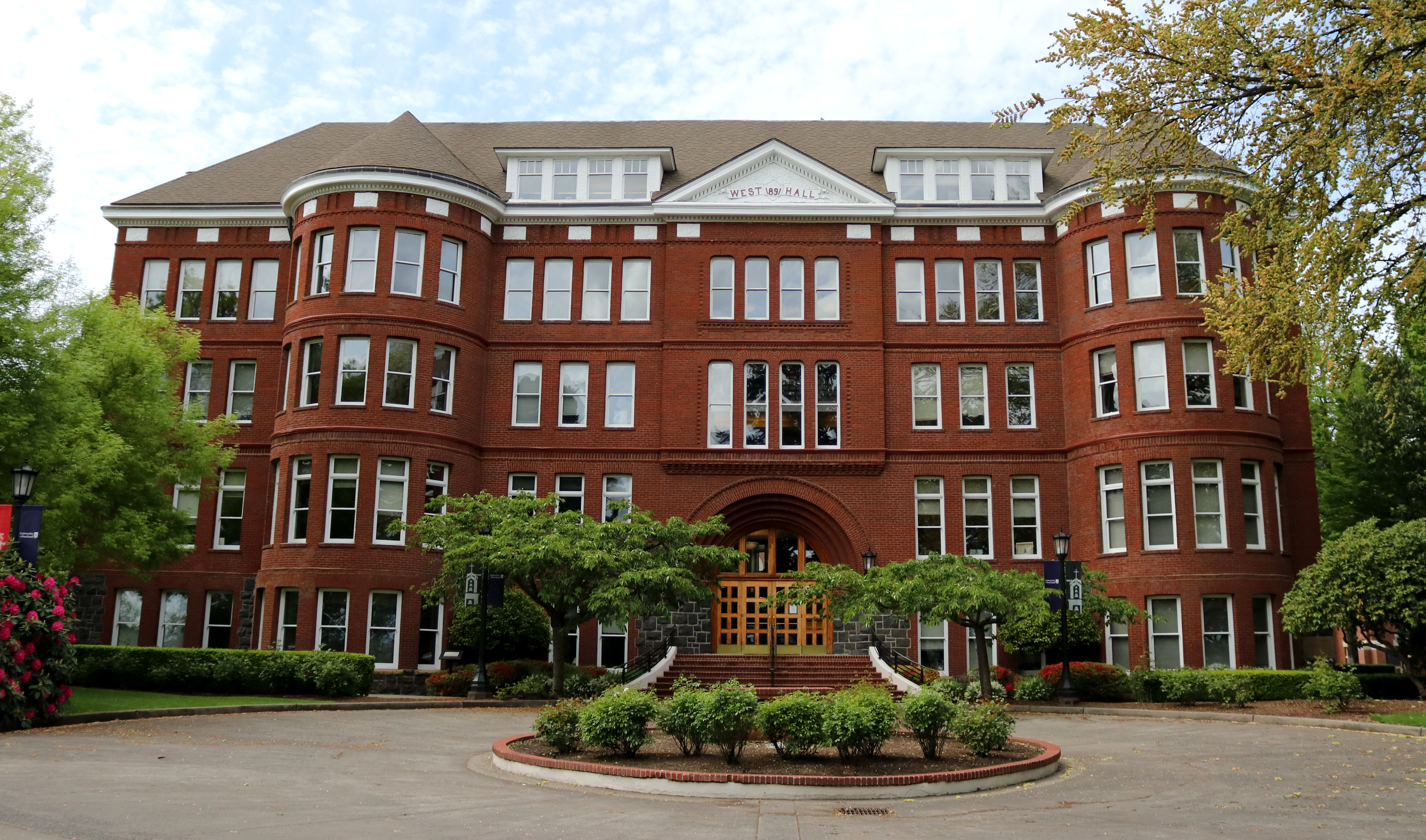
- The front in 2020
- Location: 5000 N. Willamette Boulevard; Portland, Oregon
- Coordinates: 45°34′18″N 122°43′28″W
- Built: 1891
- Architect: Frederick Manson White; Richard H. Martin, Jr. William F. McCaw
- Architectural style: Romanesque
- NRHP reference No.: 77001114
- Added to NRHP: September 22, 1977

Waldschmidt Hall (originally West Hall) is an academic building at the University of Portland in Portland, Oregon, United States. Constructed in 1891 as West Hall, the building was originally part of the now defunct Portland University located in North Portland overlooking the Willamette River. The Romanesque style structure built of brick and stone stands five stories tall. The hall was added to the National Register of Historic Places in 1977 and renovated in 1992, the same year it took the current name. Waldschmidt, the oldest building on campus, now houses the school's administration offices and some classrooms.

== History ==
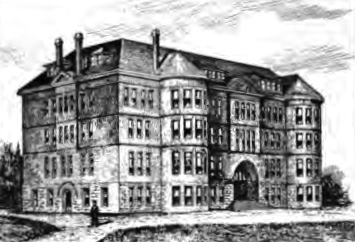
Sketch of the building in 1894

Members of the Methodist Episcopal Church founded Portland University in 1891 in Portland and began raising funds to open the school. That year the university built a five story tall brick building at a cost of $32,500. Named West Hall when it opened, it first was used as a residence hall, the school's chapel, and for classrooms, as it was the only building on campus. While a companion building was never constructed, the name "West Hall" was selected with the possibility of a future "East Hall" in mind. Portland University suffered financial problems and had to abandon the campus after defaulting on loans in 1896. The campus and West Hall then became the property of the prior owners.

In 1901, Archbishop Alexander Christie purchased the campus and building in a trade of two properties the church owned plus $1 in an effort to start a Catholic affiliated school. In September 1901, Christie opened Columbia University with West Hall as the sole building on campus. A student at the school apparently drowned in the Willamette in 1911 and is believed to haunt the building. In 1916, West Hall's appearance was enhanced with the inclusion of flowers around the building, as well as with ivy covering parts of the exterior. The task to decorate the building was promoted by Holy Cross Brother Tobias O'Brien, C.S.C., in which his stated goal was to present West Hall as looking "more attractive and picturesque." Within eighteen years, the ivy had grown above the level of West Hall's fourth story. The ivy would remain on West Hall until 1958, when it was determined that the weight of the heavy ivy curtains was accelerating the decay of the building's brick structure.

The school changed its name to the University of Portland in 1935.

== Historic landmark designation and renovations ==
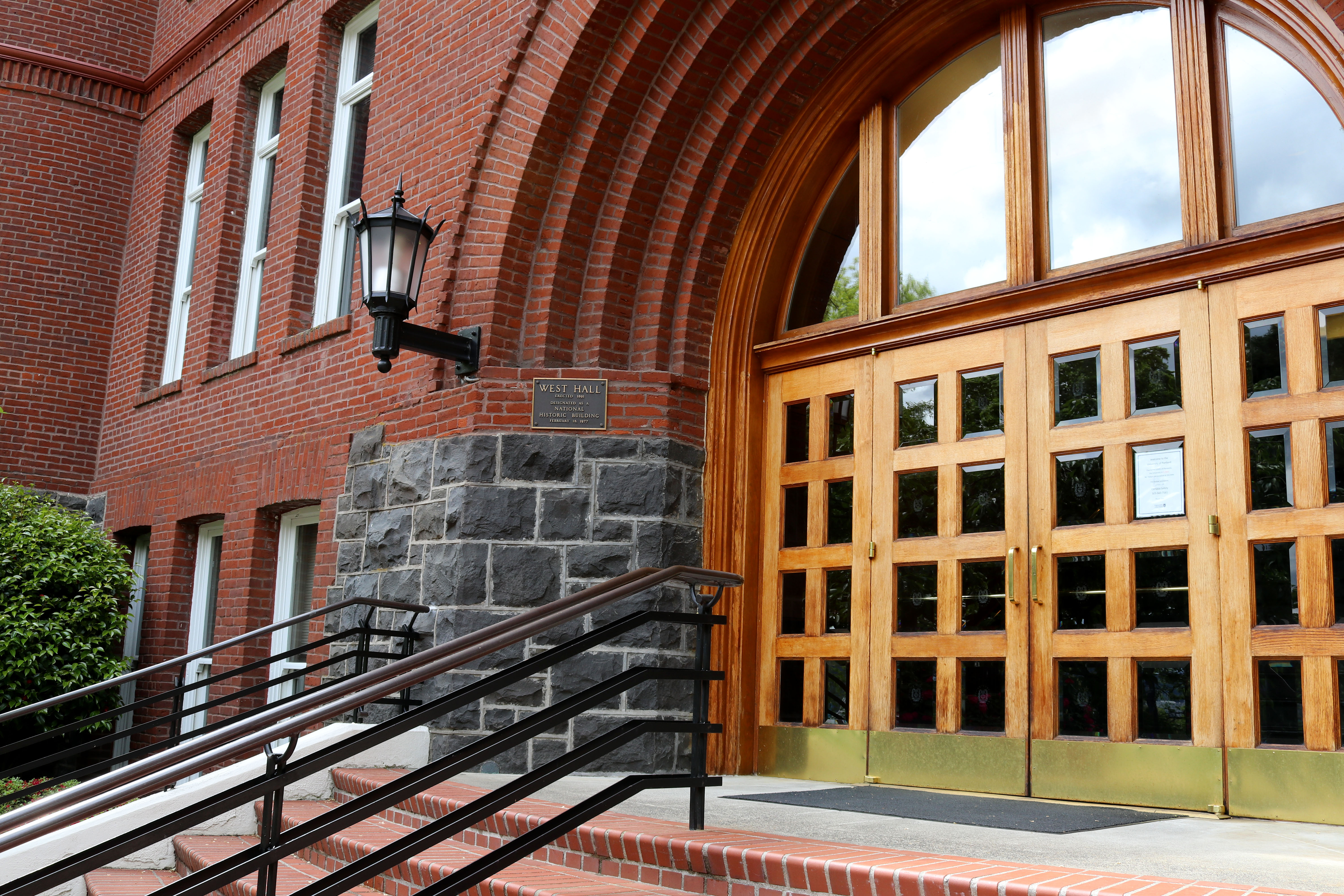
The entrance to the building, a focal point of the 1990s renovations

West Hall was designated a historic landmark by Portland in 1970, and listed on the National Register of Historic Places on September 22, 1977. Seven months prior, on February 18, 1977, a ceremony was held at the entrance of West Hall to reveal the commemorative plaque for the building's designation. University of Portland president Paul E. Waldschmidt, C.S.C. held the honors of unveiling the plaque during the festivities. Close to this time period, measures were being taken in order to preserve West Hall. In 1975, a fresh layer of mortar was applied between many of the bricks in the building to guard West Hall from deleterious weather effects.

In 1990, the school embarked on a three renovation project of the structure to bring it up to code and prevent it from falling apart. Repairs included fixing sagging walls and floors, as well a retrofitting the building to meet modern seismic standards and other building codes, such as the AVA, electrical, plumbing, and HVAC building codes. However, West Hall's recent designation on the National Register of Historic Places called for a challenging renovation process. Utilizing the design from Soderstrom Architects, the $5.5 million project utilized the original blueprints and old pictures to maintain the original look and feel of the building. Other work included making it accessible to the handicapped, replacing windows, restoring the hardwood floors, and re-creating the front entrance. The renovations also enhanced the technological capabilities of the classrooms housed in West Hall with the addition of computer classrooms. Paid for in part by private donations, the project was completed in October 1993.

== Renaming to Waldschmidt Hall ==
In October 1992, the University of Portland renamed the building as Waldschmidt Hall in honor of former school president and Roman Catholic bishop Paul E. Waldschmidt, following his retirement from his position as auxiliary bishop of Portland two years prior. The ceremony for the renaming of the building was the conclusion of a four-day celebration to honor the 150th year of the Congregation of the Holy Cross in America, in addition to the celebration of University of Portland's 90th year as an academic institution. The commemoration also included a painted portrait of Waldschmidt, which was commissioned to artist Wayne Chin. The portrait is housed on the northeast interior wall near the building's main entrance.

After renovations were completed in 1993, the hall housed the administrative offices of the university, including student services, and some classrooms. On May 1, 2001, the United States Postal Service dedicated a commemorative postcard in honor of the university's 100 anniversary that featured Waldschmidt Hall. Part of the Postal Services Historic Preservation series, the computer generated image of the building was created by John Pirman.

== Architectural details ==
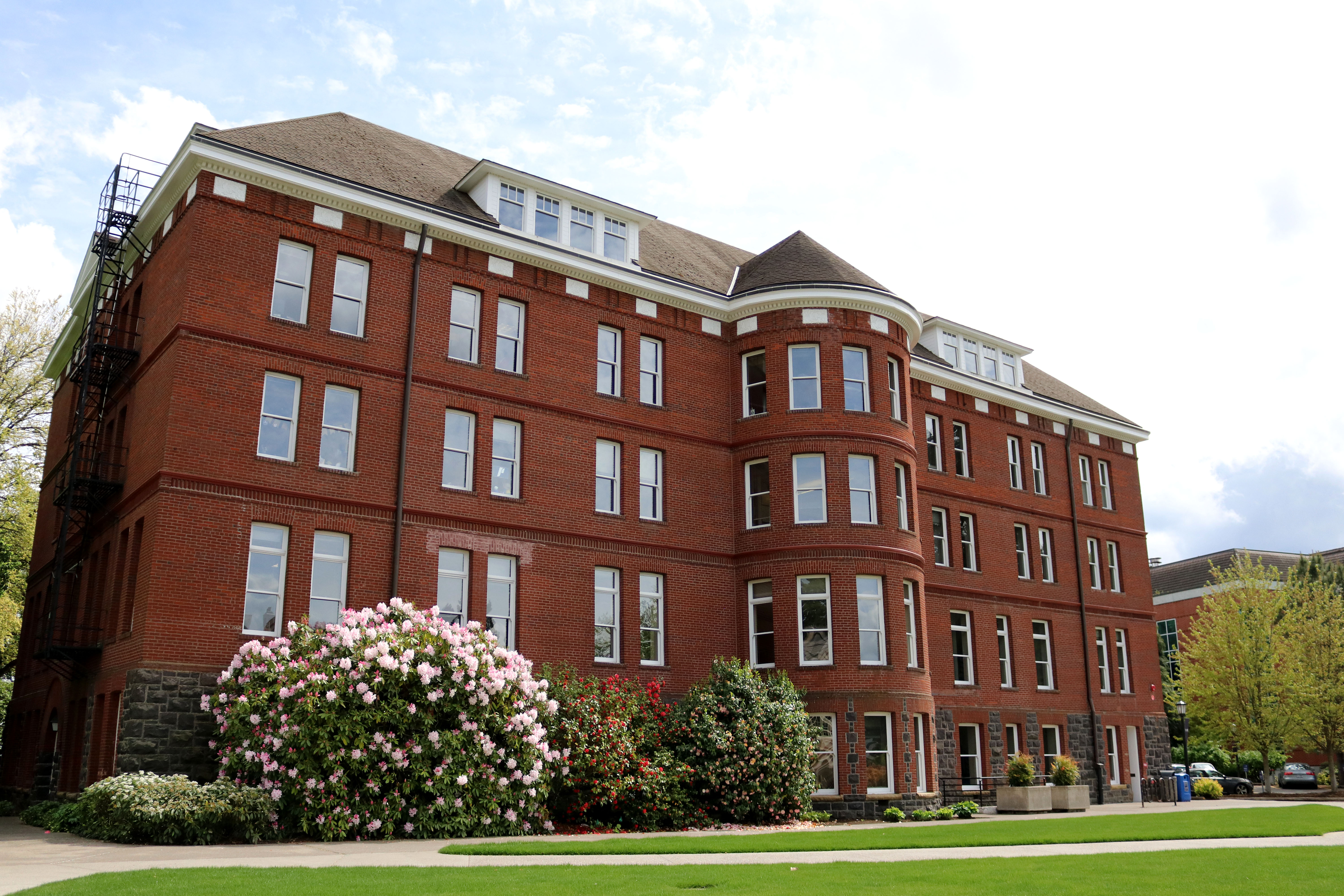
The back of Waldschmidt Hall

Frederick Manson White, Richard H. Martin, Jr., and William F. McCaw served as the three original architects for the building. Romanesque in architectural style, the five story structure has stone, brick, and cast iron on the exterior. The hall was patterned after Harvard University's Sever Hall and includes a wide, domed entrance. The abundant use of brick on the building's exterior is also indicative of a Sever Hall inspiration. As a result, Waldschmidt Hall's design is similar in style to buildings modeled after the Collegiate Gothic style, an architectural style that was commonly associated with private colleges in the eastern United States during the late 19th century, but, nevertheless, found its way to the Pacific Northwest. The red brick exterior used for Waldschmidt Hall also marks a hint of Richardsonian Romanesque inspiration, a style that White could be associated with in the Pacific Northwest, for buildings such as the Hotel Vintage Plaza in Portland. Measuring 30,000 square feet (2,800 m^{2}), Waldschmidt is the oldest building the University of Portland campus.

The interior of the building features walls paneled with cherry wood, oak flooring, a carpeted stairway, large windows, modern furnishings, and old photographs of the hall hung on some walls. As of 2009, Waldschmidt Hall houses the university's administrative offices including admissions and the registrar, as well as some classrooms. Some of the red bricks outside of the top floor have initials carved into them by former students.

== See also ==
- National Register of Historic Places listings in North Portland, Oregon
