= Glover Mansion =

- U.S. National Register of Historic Places
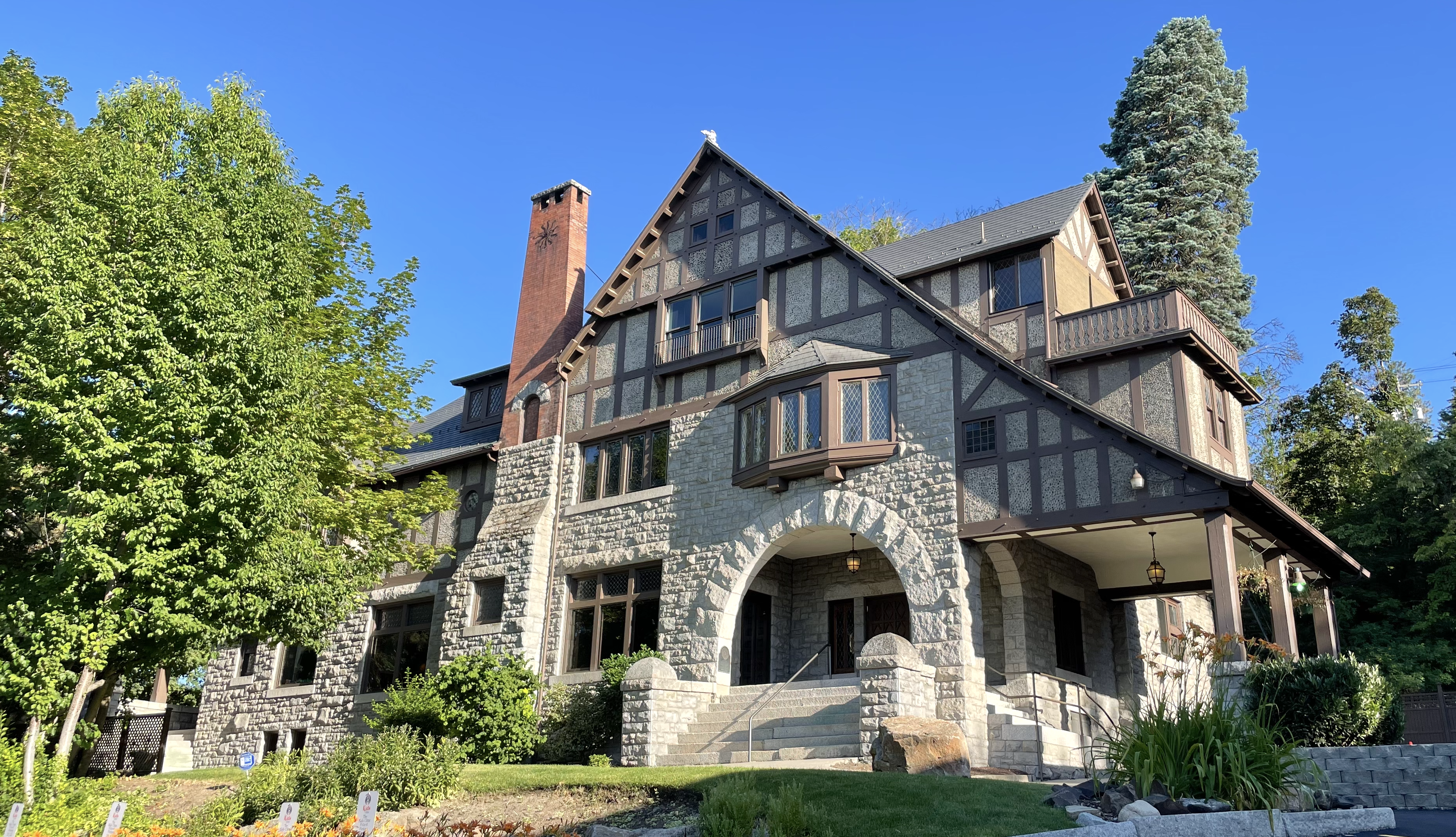
- Glover Mansion in 2022

- Location within Spokane riverfront area Location within Washington (state)
- Location: 321 W. 8th Ave., Spokane, Washington
- Coordinates: 47°38′53″N 117°25′02″W
- Area: one acre
- Built: 1888
- Architect: Kirtland Cutter
- Architectural style: English Tudor revival
- NRHP reference No.: 73001892
- Added to NRHP: August 14, 1973

The Glover Mansion is a historic Tudor revival home built in 1888 and located in the Cliff/Cannon neighborhood of Spokane, Washington, just uphill from and overlooking the city's downtown. The home was designed by architect Kirtland Cutter for James N. Glover, who founded the city of Spokane in 1873. Over the years the Glover Mansion has served as a residence, housed Spokane's Unitarian Universalist Church, and more recently been used as an event venue.

The Glover Mansion was added to the National Register of Historic Places (NRHP) in 1973, and to the Spokane Register of Historic Places in 1995. As of 2022, the Glover Mansion's main use is as an event venue known for hosting weddings and receptions. It should not be confused with the Glover House, another former home of James Glover in Spokane that is also listed on the NRHP.

== History ==
James Glover came to Spokane in May 1873 from Salem, Oregon. At the time, there was little more than a rudimentary saw mill in what would become Spokane. Glover was taken with the setting of the Spokane Falls and on his second day, he had purchased the sawmill and the rest of the land surrounding the falls. Over the years that followed, Glover would come to be known as the founding father of the city of Spokane and would serve as its second mayor. Wealthy and powerful, Glover commissioned architect Kirtland Cutter to design his grand mansion on a hillside to the south of the city center. It was Kirtland's first major project, and helped spur a career that would make him one of Spokane's most renowned and prolific architects. Glover and his wife, Susan, moved into the mansion shortly before the August 1889 Great Spokane Fire, which devastated the downtown core. Less than two years later, Glover and his wife separated, and ultimately divorced. Glover's wife was later committed at Eastern State Hospital, buried in an unmarked grave, and largely erased from history.

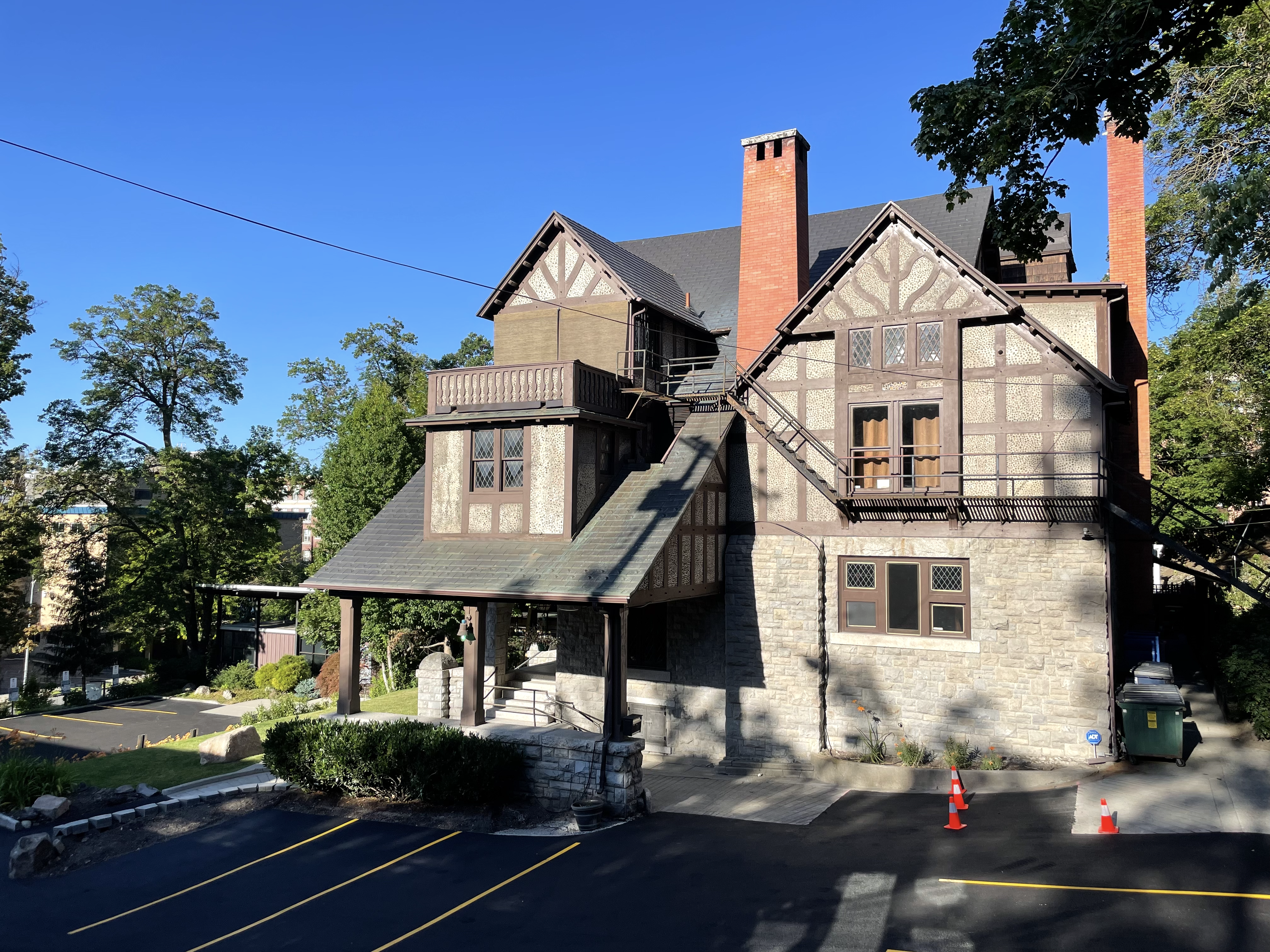
West view of the Glover Mansion, with the 1961 building visible on the left.

Glover's fortunes turned during the Panic of 1893, which drove him nearly into bankruptcy. As a result, he lost possession of the mansion. In 1898, Lawyer Frank H. Graves purchased the mansion, which he owned until 1904. The mansion cost Glover $100,000 to build, but he sold it for just $30,000. From 1904 until 1908 the mansion was owned by mining magnate Charles Sweeney, father of Charles Sweeny, an American soldier of fortune. The mansion passed to Patrick Welch, a contractor, who owned the home from 1908 until 1943. In 1943, the Unitarian Church purchased the property.

In 1961, the church constructed a mid-century building in the northern portion of the grounds, along Eighth Ave., which served as the church meeting house. The Unitarian Church owned the mansion and grounds until 1991, when it was sold to Neila Poteshman and Tod Doran. The mansion has had several owners since, and been used as a restaurant, and more recently as an event venue known for hosting weddings.

The mansion was added to the Spokane Register of Historic Places in 1995. Mansion ownership signed a management agreement with the city, in which the city recognizes it as a historic landmark and the owner gives the city power to approve or disapprove plans for demolition, relocation, change in use, or alterations to the exterior of the structure.

== Description ==
=== Setting ===
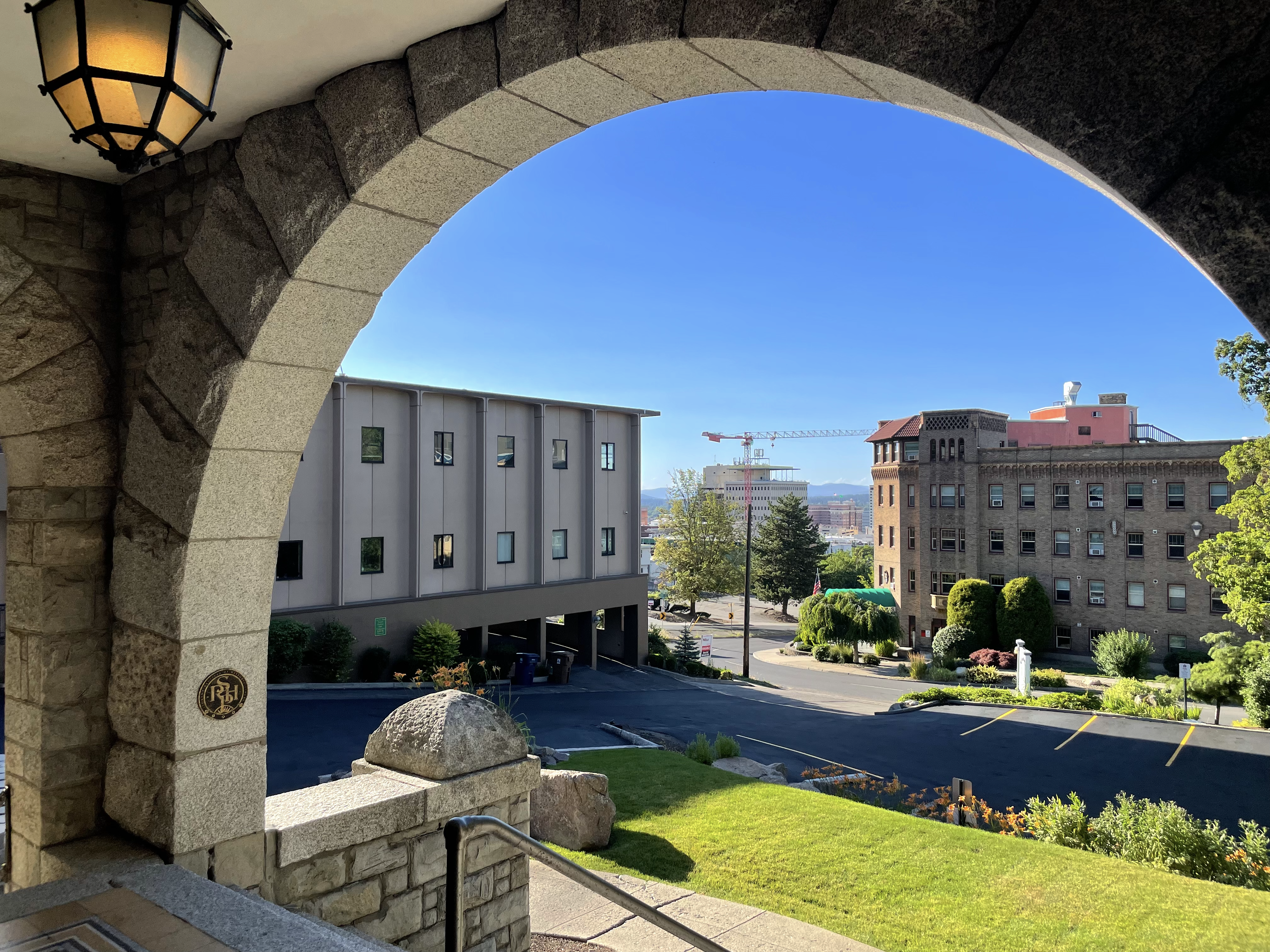
View from the main entrance, looking northwest across Downtown Spokane.

The Glover Mansion is located in the Cliff/Cannon Neighborhood, just uphill from Downtown Spokane. Eighth Avenue to the north, Washington Street/Ben Garnet Way to the west, and Ninth Avenue to the south, form a major transportation corridor leading into and out of the city center. All three streets adjacent to the property are classified as arterials by the city. The property is surrounded by a three-story office building on the east across Washington Street, multi-story office and apartment buildings to the north across Eighth Avenue, including the historic Breslin, and multi-story medical facilities to the south and east, most of which are part of the Sacred Heart Medical Center campus.

At the time of its construction and through to the present day, the area surrounding the Glover Mansion has been filled with grand homes for prominent and wealthy Spokanites. The Marycliff-Cliff Park Historic District, listed on the NRHP, is located immediately to the south and west of the Glover Mansion. Though the mansion itself is not part of the district.

=== Architecture ===
Architect Kirtland Cutter designed the three-story structure in the Tudor revival style. The lower portions of the exterior are made of granite while the upper sections are half-timbered. There are numerous gables that overhang the home. The front porch contains a double-door main entrance which is located behind a stone semi-circular archway. Immediately to the west of the main entrance is a covered carriageway. Above the archway is a set of bay windows on the second story. A red brick chimney rises above the granite from the second story of the home in the center of the front, north facade. To the east of the chimney are a pair of circular porthole windows on the second floor. The east side of the home features a large ground floor porch with a sleeping balcony on the second story above it.

The interior features a large two story hall, with a mezzanine wrapping around on the second story. There is also a wood-carved balcony overlooking the hall from the master suite.
