= Park Inn (restaurant) =

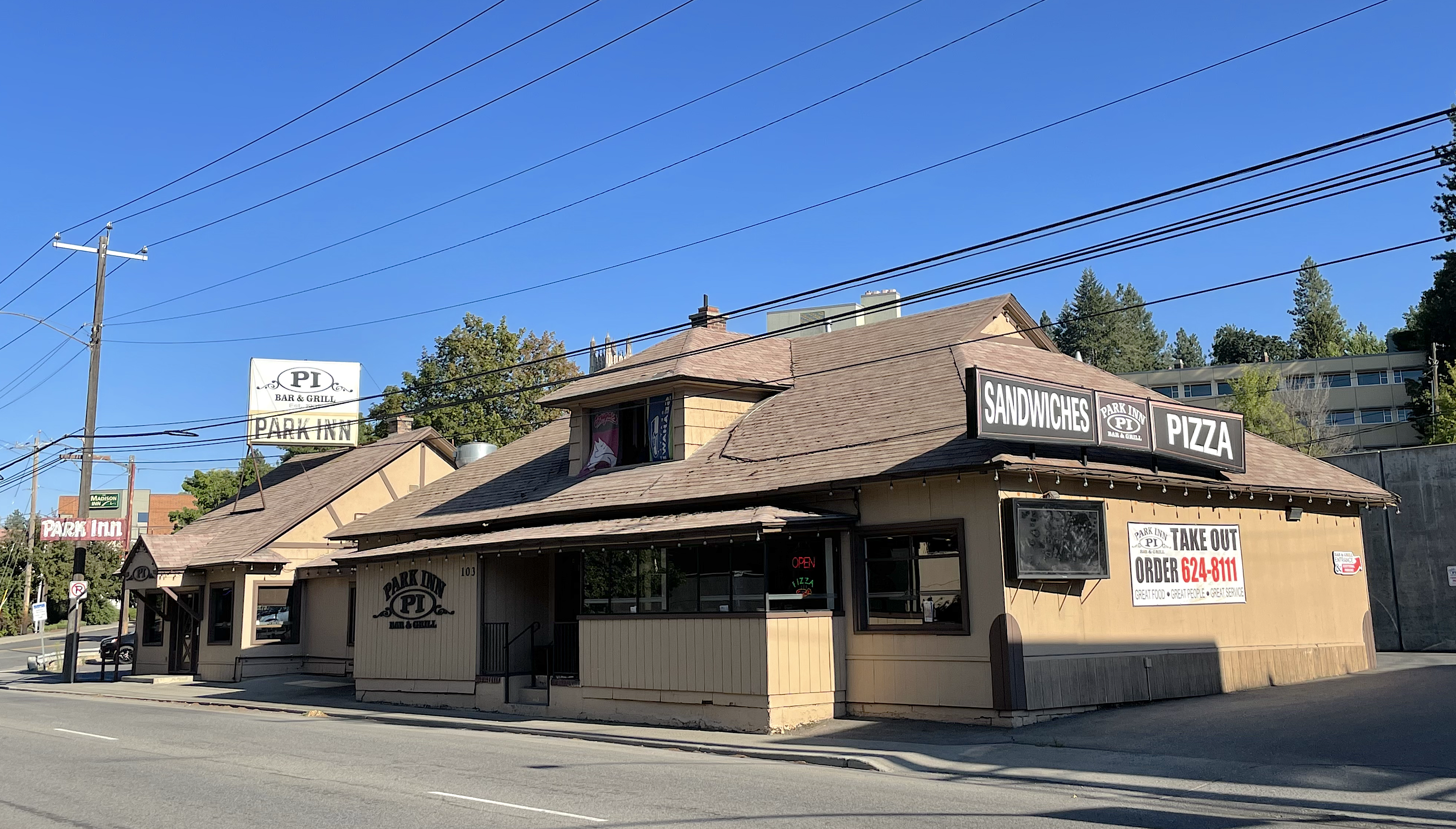
- Interactive map of Park Inn

Restaurant information
- Established: 1932
- Owner: Marcus Schmick
- Location: 103 W. Ninth Avenue, Spokane, Washington, 99204, United States
- Coordinates: 47.6472175°N 117.414252°W
- Website: parkinnspokane.com

The Park Inn, commonly known as the PI, is a bar and restaurant in the Cliff/Cannon neighborhood of Spokane, Washington. Ownership of the Park Inn has changed hands numerous times over the years, but it has remained in business at its current location continuously since 1932, making it the oldest restaurant in the Spokane area.

The bar and restaurant began as separate businesses in separate but adjacent buildings, with restaurant operating officially as the Park Plaza, but the two were joined in the 1960s.

The restaurant side is known for its pizza and sandwiches, as well as award winning broasted chicken. The bar is known for its vintage decor, some of which has been adorning the walls and ceilings since the 1950s, as well as for its clientele who come from across varied age groups and socioeconomic backgrounds.

== Description ==
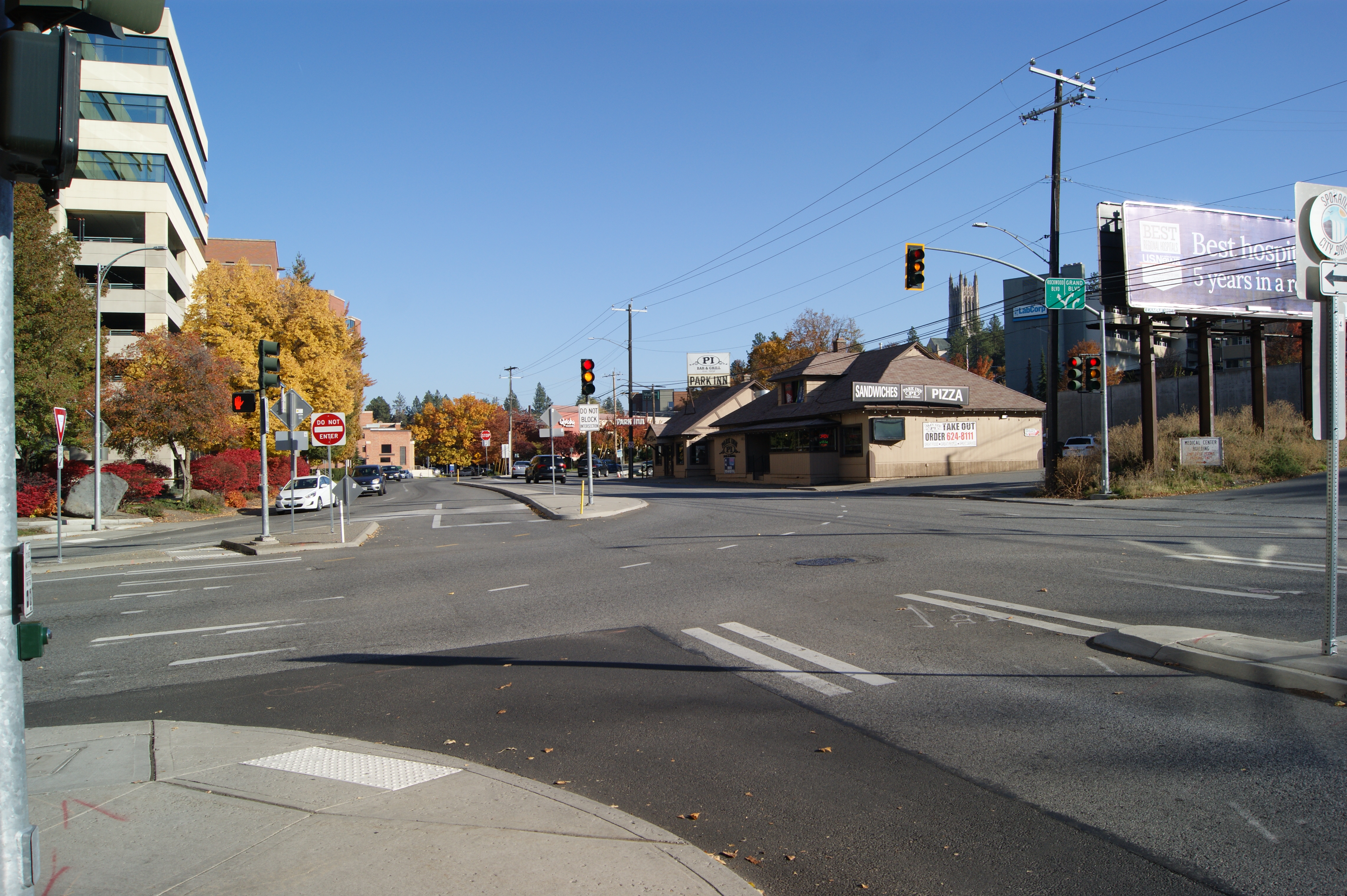
The Park Inn is situated across the street from the Sacred Heart campus where Ninth Ave. forks

The Park Inn is located about midway up the slope of Spokane's South Hill, above the downtown core and across the street from Sacred Heart Medical Center. Ninth Avenue in this area is a very busy arterial street, as it is part of a couplet of one way streets feeding into and out of the city center. Heading southbound (uphill), immediately east of the Park Inn, Ninth Avenue curves to become Grand Boulevard, one of the three principal north-south thoroughfares on the south side of Spokane. Its location across the street from a major hospital has made it a popular spot for medical workers over the years. It also attracts customers from across the socioeconomic spectrum, which is reflective of the neighborhood in which it is located with both apartment buildings and stately historic mansions within just one block of the Park Inn.

Until the 1960s, the bar and restaurant were separate businesses in separate buildings, and that history is still visible today. The family-friendly restaurant is located in the larger section that was once the western of the two buildings, while the bar area is located in the smaller former eastern building. The two were connected into one building, with a short hallway allowing patrons to pass from one side to the other. Food and drinks are served in both.

Menu items include hamburgers, hot and cold sandwiches, pizza, chicken and various appetizers. The bar has 13 beers permanently on tap as well as a few rotating taps featuring local or craft beers, as well as bottled and canned beers, seltzers and ciders and a full liquor selection.

There are a handful of arcade games at the Park Inn, such as pinball. It is also known for its eclectic, verging on antique decor with some of the items having been in place since the middle of the 20th century. Numerous vintage-style prints of Spokane landmarks by local artist Chris Bovey adorn the walls, along with photographs and sports memorabilia. Above the main entrance to the bar portion of the building hang numerous model airplanes dating to around 1950, which were given to the bar by a regular who lost a leg serving in World War II.

During the COVID-19 pandemic, when indoor dining was prohibited and later limited in capacity, a covered outdoor seating area was built in a portion of the parking lot adjacent to the east side of the building. As of 2022, more than a year after capacity limits were lifted, the outdoor seating area remains in place.

== History ==
Prior to its establishment as the Park Inn, the building was constructed by and for the Monroe St. Lumber Company. It served as a storefront. There were three buildings on the property, two of which remain. What is now the restaurant was in the center, with two symmetrical rectangular buildings to the east and west. The western building was demolished decades later to make way for a driveway to the parking lot. The east building remains as the bar, and has been connected to the central building since the 1960s.

Founded in 1932 as Freeman's Park Inn, the Park Inn has operated under various versions of that name and various ownership groups, continuously since it was established, making it the oldest existing restaurant in the Spokane area. The "Freeman" who was the original namesake has been lost to history, as has the reasoning behind using "Park Inn" in the name. The Park Inn is not currently nor ever was located in or adjacent to a city park, and the closest city park to the restaurant was not established until 13 years after the Park Inn was founded and so named. Hypotheses have arisen including the abundant automobile parking at the restaurant, during the early years of the automotive boom, or that the name comes from its location on one of the final streetcar stops before Manito Park, half a mile up the hill.

Four years later, in 1936, the name was changed to the Park Inn Restaurant. It became the Park Inn Cafe in 1954, briefly known as Ralph's Park Inn Cafe. From the 1950s through the 1980s one side was a cafe while the other was a tavern. In the 1980s, the state liquor board forced the Park Inn to drop "Tavern" from its name, giving the bar and restaurant its current name.
