= Cowley Park =

Park in Spokane, Washington, United States

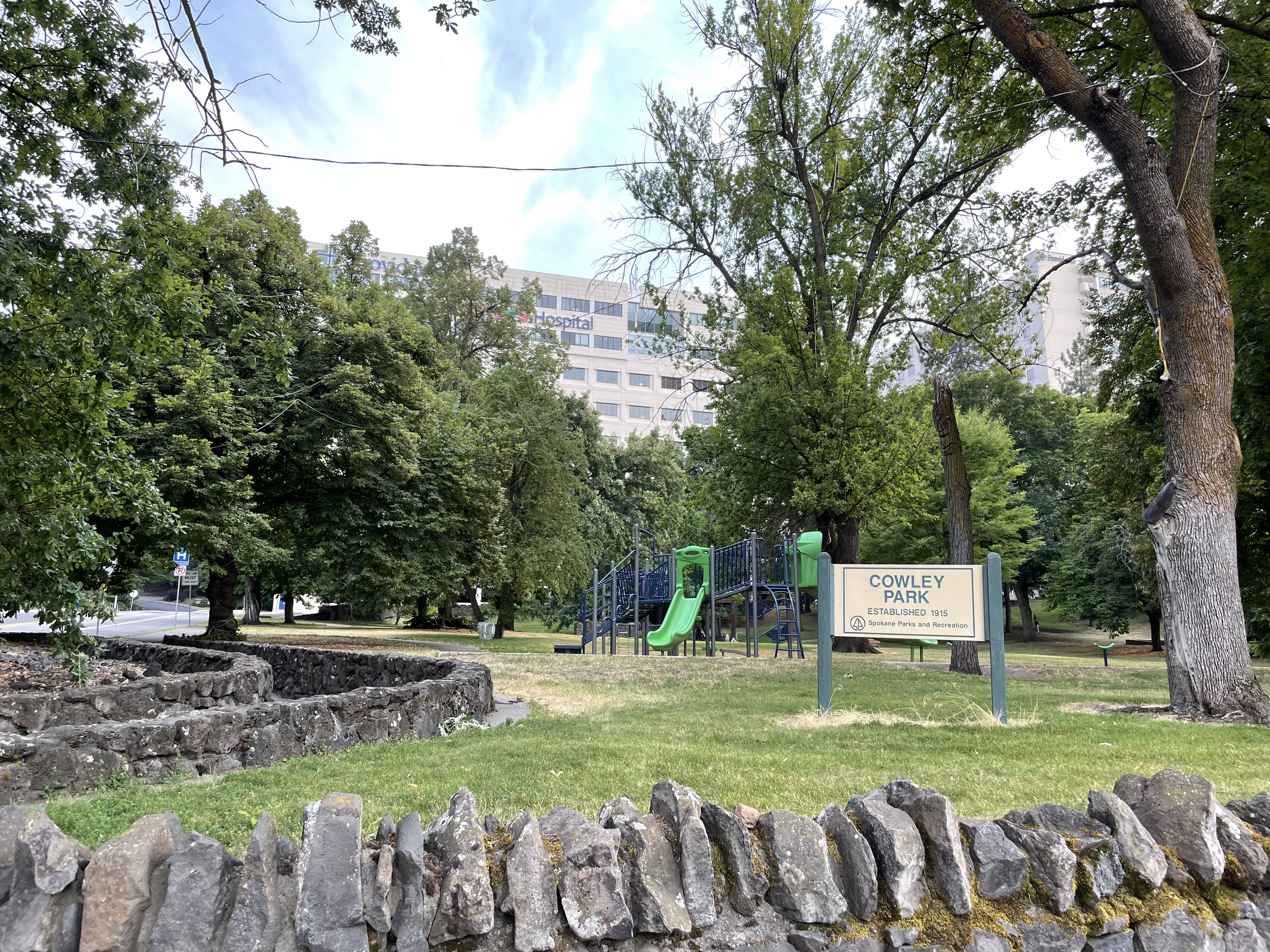
- Cowley Park
- Interactive map of Cowley Park
- Type: Urban Park
- Location: Spokane, Washington, US
- Coordinates: 47°38′59.8″N 117°24′42.4″W
- Area: 2.08 acres (0.84 ha)
- Established: 1915; 111 years ago
- Operator: Spokane Parks and Recreation Department
- Status: Open year round (daily 6 a.m. to 10 pm)
- Public transit: Spokane Transit Authority Route 12
- Cowley Park
- U.S. National Register of Historic Places
- Location within Spokane riverfront area
- Built: 1874
- NRHP reference No.: 73001891
- Added to NRHP: February 6, 1973

Cowley Park is a 2.2 acres (0.89 ha) public park at 6th Avenue and Division Street in the Cliff/Cannon neighborhood of Spokane, Washington.

It was established as a public park in 1915, but its history of importance to the city predates that by numerous decades to the very first years of European American settlement of Spokane. Cowley Park is named for Reverend Henry T. Cowley who, along with his family, arrived in the area in 1874. They first constructed a cabin and in the years that followed built the city's first schoolhouse in what is now Cowley Park. The park was listed on the National Register of Historic Places (NRHP) in 1973 making it Spokane's first listing on the register.

Since becoming a public park, Cowley Park has been developed into a grass-covered, tree-shaded park with a playground, restroom facilities, picnic areas and a historical monument. Each winter it hosts a holiday lights display that is open to the public but also geared towards patients at Providence Sacred Heart Medical Center and Children's Hospital, as the children's hospital is directly across the street to the south of the park and the campus of the medical center surrounds the park on three sides.

== History ==
The area that is now Cowley Park, like the rest of the city of Spokane and surrounding area, was inhabited by the Spokane people for centuries prior to contact with European settlers.

With the arrival of European settlers in the 1870s, in the early days of what would become the city of Spokane, Cowley Park became a key location for contact between the indigenous population and the settlers. Henry T. Cowley and his family arrived in Spokane in October 1874, with the intention of establishing a school as missionaries and teachers. At the time, there were only three other white families in the nascent city. Members of the Spokane tribe promised to help build a home and provide food for the newly arrived missionaries in exchange for education.

As winter approached in 1874, Cowley's family was able to build a log cabin with assistance of the Spokane people, the first permanent structure built in what is now Cowley Park. The original 16-foot-by-24-foot structure was composed of two rooms, with an attic above and a kitchen added on. In addition to helping provide logs for construction, the Spokane people brought salmon, venison and flour for the Cowley family. A Spokane elder brought milk for the Cowley children on a daily basis as well. The first school in the city, which served both native Spokane children and those of the new white settlers, was housed in the original Cowley Cabin. School began on January 1, 1875, with five girls and one boy in attendance.

A second school was constructed across Division Street from what is now Cowley Park on Sixth Avenue in 1875, this one meant for the native population, as Cowley had determined he could not properly conduct missionary work while also running the school in his home.

=== Henry T. Cowley ===
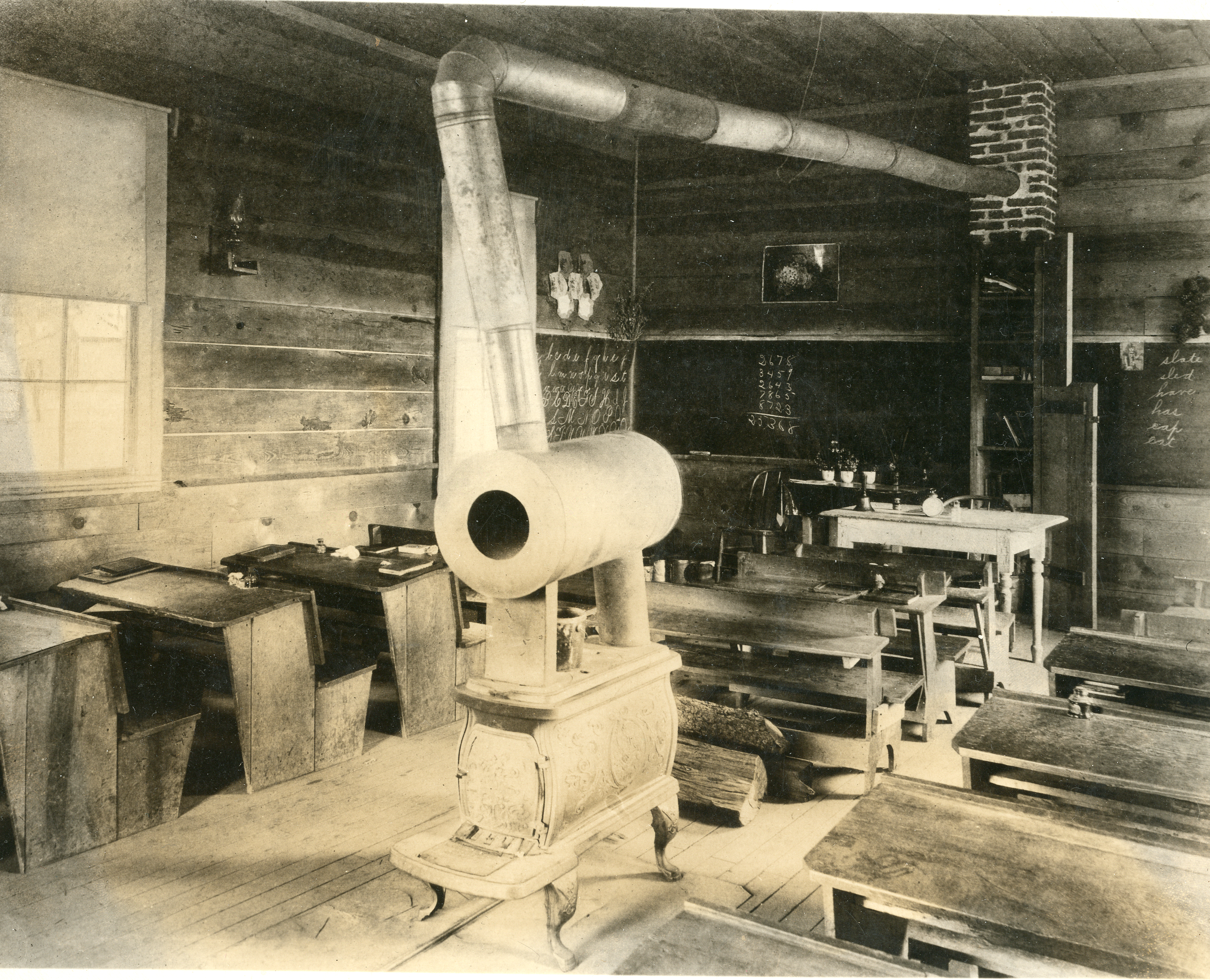
Interior of Cowley's second school building

Cowley, along with his wife Abigail and their three young children, arrived in Spokane in 1874. Cowley was a graduate of a theological seminary in Auburn, New York. After graduating and prior to arriving to Spokane, Cowley did missionary work among the Nez Perce in what is now Lapwai, Idaho and then Kamiah, where he established the first Protestant church in Idaho. From there the Cowley family moved to near what is now Grangeville. It was there that they were asked to move to Spokane after a petition from the native population to establish a school in the area and encouraged to do so by missionary Henry H. Spalding.

For eight years starting on January 1, 1875, Cowley served as a teacher for the native population and an intermediary between them and the growing settler population. In addition to his teaching work, Cowley also held Presbyterian religious services at Spokane and Wellpinit on what is now the Spokane Indian Reservation.

== Geography ==
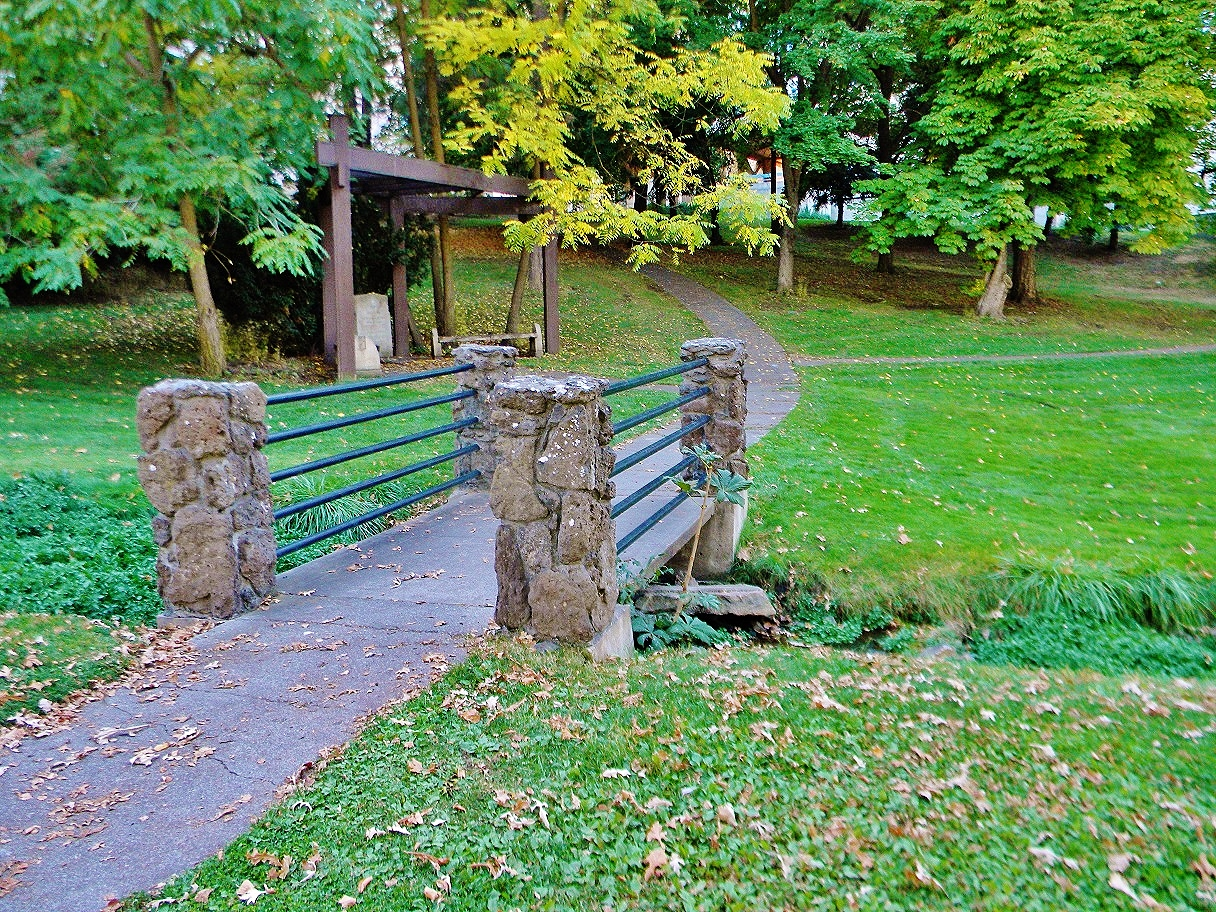
Cowley Park path with historical marker beyond the bridge

Contemporary Cowley Park is located along Division Street, between Sixth and Seventh Avenues, in the Cliff/Cannon neighborhood on Spokane's South Hill, two blocks from Downtown Spokane. It is surrounded by the Providence Sacred Heart Medical Center and Children's Hospital campus. The land slopes up to the south from the flat valley of the Spokane River, which runs roughly one mile to the north. Cowley Park is on a relatively gentle slope of the hill leading up from the valley, at approximately 2,000 feet above sea level. Immediately to the south of the park the slope becomes considerably steeper.

Division Street is the main north–south surface street in the city of Spokane, but south of Interstate 90, located two blocks north of Cowley Park, it is considered to be a minor arterial. The nearest public transit access is from Spokane Transit Authority Route 12, the Southside Medical Shuttle, which runs along Seventh Avenue and Division Street immediately past Cowley Park.

== See also ==
- Spokane, Washington – Parks and recreation
- NRHP listings in Spokane, Washington
