= Westminster United Church of Christ =

Historic church in Washington, United States

- First Congregational Church of Spokane
- U.S. National Register of Historic Places
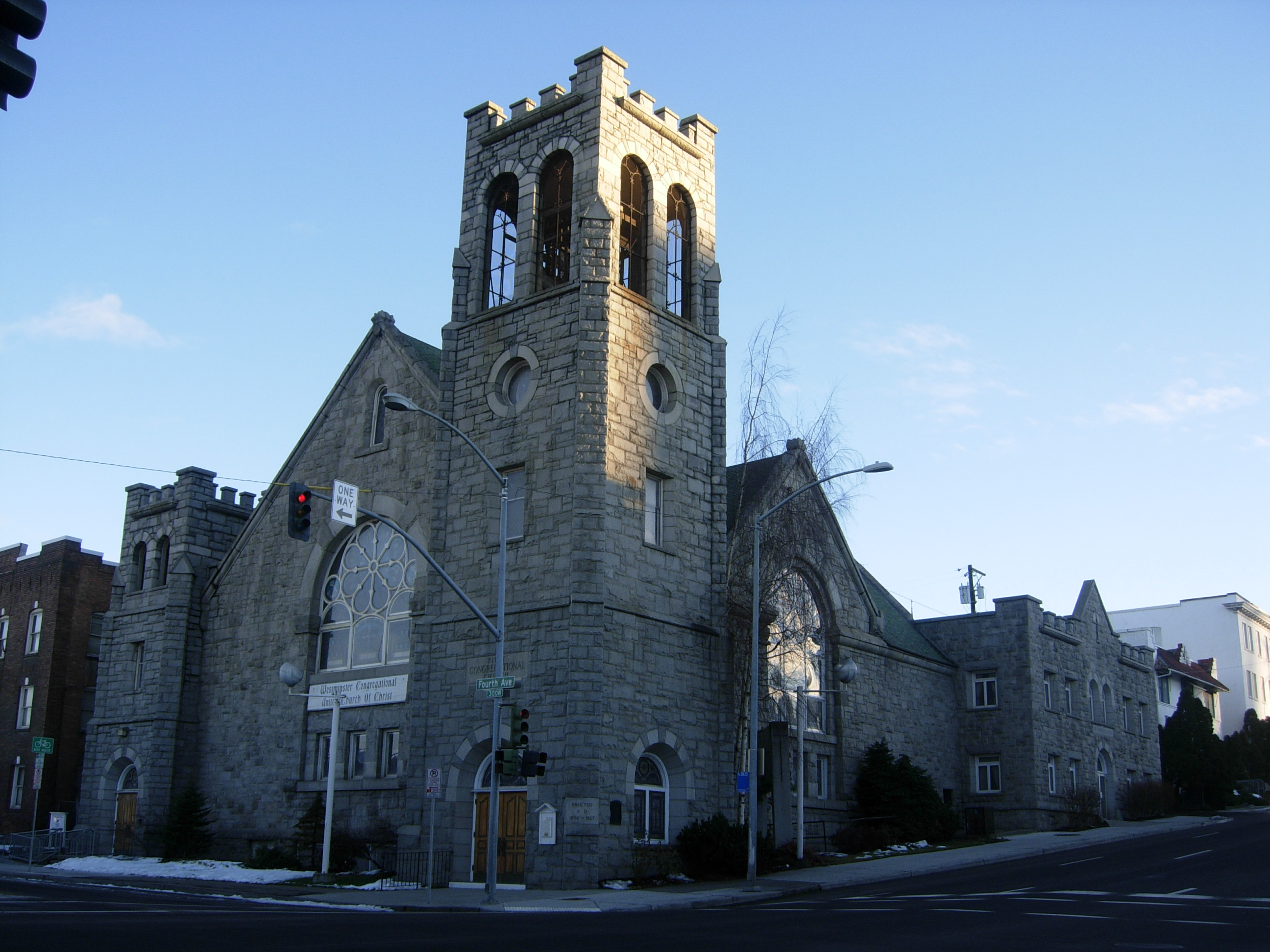

- Location within Spokane riverfront area
- Location: 411 S. Washington St., Spokane, Washington
- Coordinates: 47.6521°N 117.4176°W
- Area: less than one acre
- Built: 1890, 1927
- Architect: Worthy Niver; John K. Dow
- Architectural style: Richardsonian Romanesque
- NRHP reference No.: 78002775
- Added to NRHP: April 26, 1978

Westminster United Church of Christ, originally the First Congregational Church, is a historic church in the Cliff/Cannon neighborhood of Spokane, Washington. It is affiliated with the United Church of Christ.

The current building was built in 1890 in a Richardsonian Romanesque style and enlarged in 1927 to include larger towers and a Sunday School. Soon afterwards, the congregation merged with Westminster Presbyterian Church. The building was added to the National Register of Historic Places in 1978.
