= MultiCare Deaconess Hospital =

- MultiCare Health System
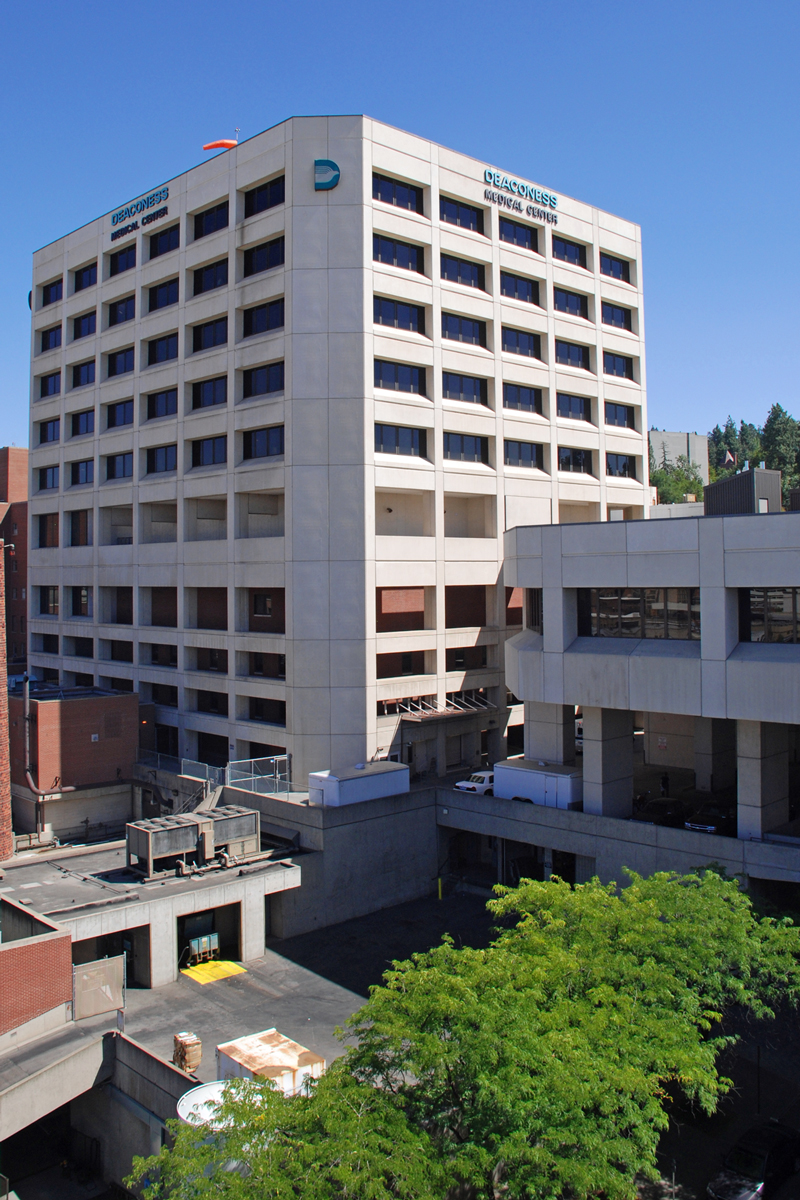
- Patient tower in 2007

Geography
- Location: 800 W 5th Avenue, Spokane, Washington, United States
- Coordinates: 47°39′06″N 117°25′25″W

Organization
- Care system: Private
- Type: General

Services
- Standards: Joint Commission
- Emergency department: III
- Beds: 388

Helipads
- Helipad: Yes

History
- Founded: 1896, 130 years ago

Links
- Website: www.multicare.org/deaconess-hospital/
- Lists: Hospitals in Washington state

MultiCare Deaconess Hospital—more commonly known as Deaconess Hospital and formerly known as Deaconess Medical Center—is a 388-bed non-profit general medical and surgical hospital in the northwest United States, located in Spokane, Washington. Established in 1896, the hospital has 1,604 employees, and operates a Level III trauma center and Level III Neonatal Intensive Care Unit. Deaconess Hospital is rated as a "high performing" hospital in two adult procedures and conditions according to U.S. News & World Report. In 2019, the hospital performed 3,381 inpatient surgeries, 6,547 outpatient surgeries, delivered 1,384 babies, and had 55,889 Emergency Department visits.

== History ==
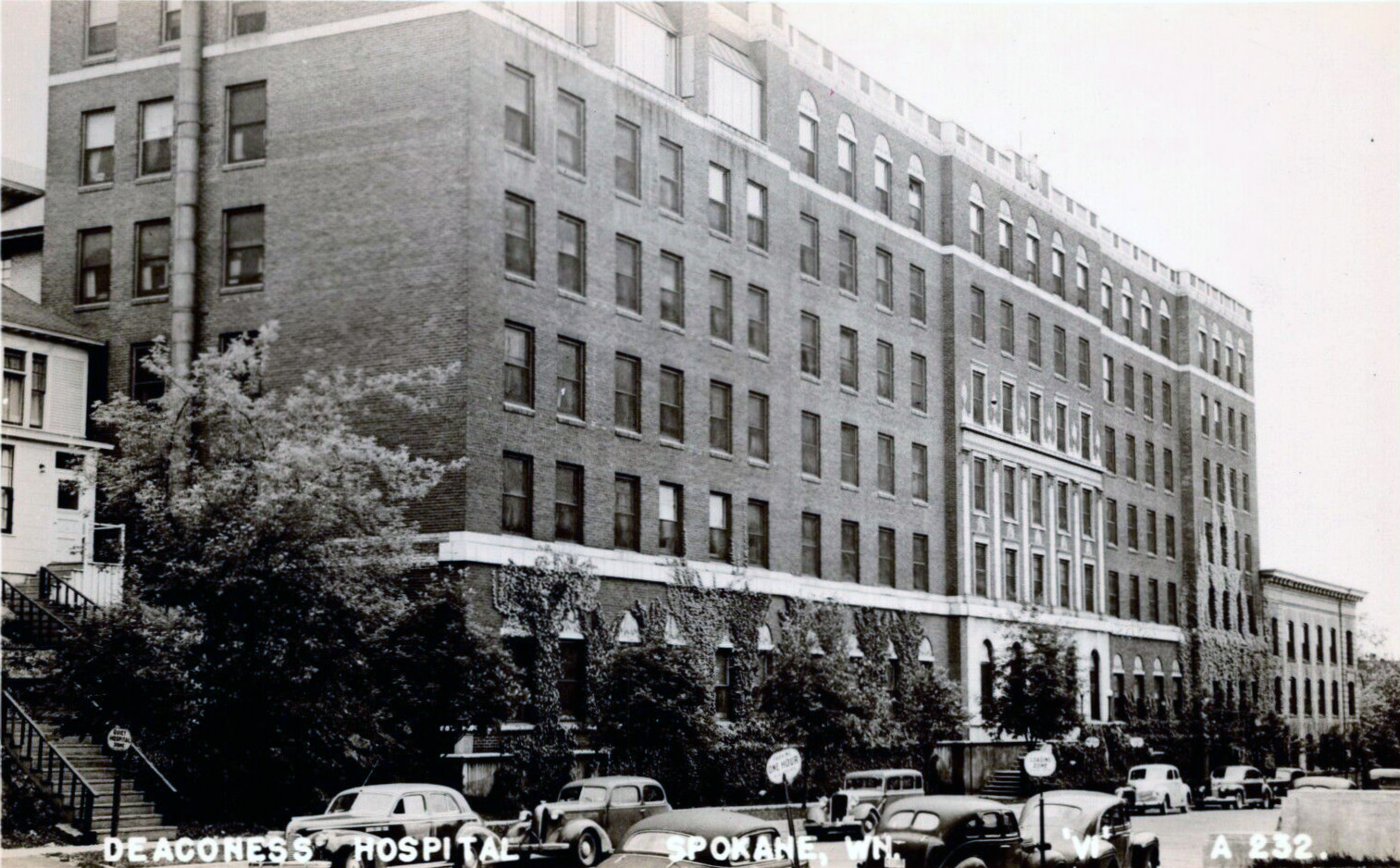
The hospital in 1930

Deaconess Hospital was established 130 years ago in 1896 as one of the first hospitals in Spokane. One of its early specialties was orthopedic surgery. It is located immediately south of Interstate 90 at Fourth Avenue, on the west side of Lewis and Clark High School in the Cliff/Cannon neighborhood.

The Tennessee-based for-profit Community Health Systems bought both Deaconess and Valley Hospitals in Spokane for $270 million in 2008, and followed the purchase up with the $50 million acquisition of the Rockwood Clinic primary, specialty, and urgent care system that services the region to create an integrated clinic and hospital network. The state health department of approval of the sale to CHS and its conversion to for-profit status came with stipulations that it invest $100 million in both facilities in five years and increase the amount of charity care among other criteria. The Rockwood Health System (formerly Empire Health Services), the previous owners of the properties sued CHS for allegedly failing to meet its obligations under the agreement and Washington state law in providing free of cost charity care to low-income people which resulted in a $50 million settlement to forgive medical debt in 2019. Tacoma-based not-for-profit provider, MultiCare bought the holdings from CHS in 2016.

In 2011, the name of the hospital was changed from Deaconess Medical Center back to Deaconess Hospital. The hospital opened the MultiCare Deaconess Cancer Center in a new facility on their campus in 2021, which is designed to provide comprehensive care with a team-based approach.

== See also ==
- Sacred Heart Medical Center
