= Cliff/Cannon, Spokane =

Cliff/Cannon
- Neighborhood
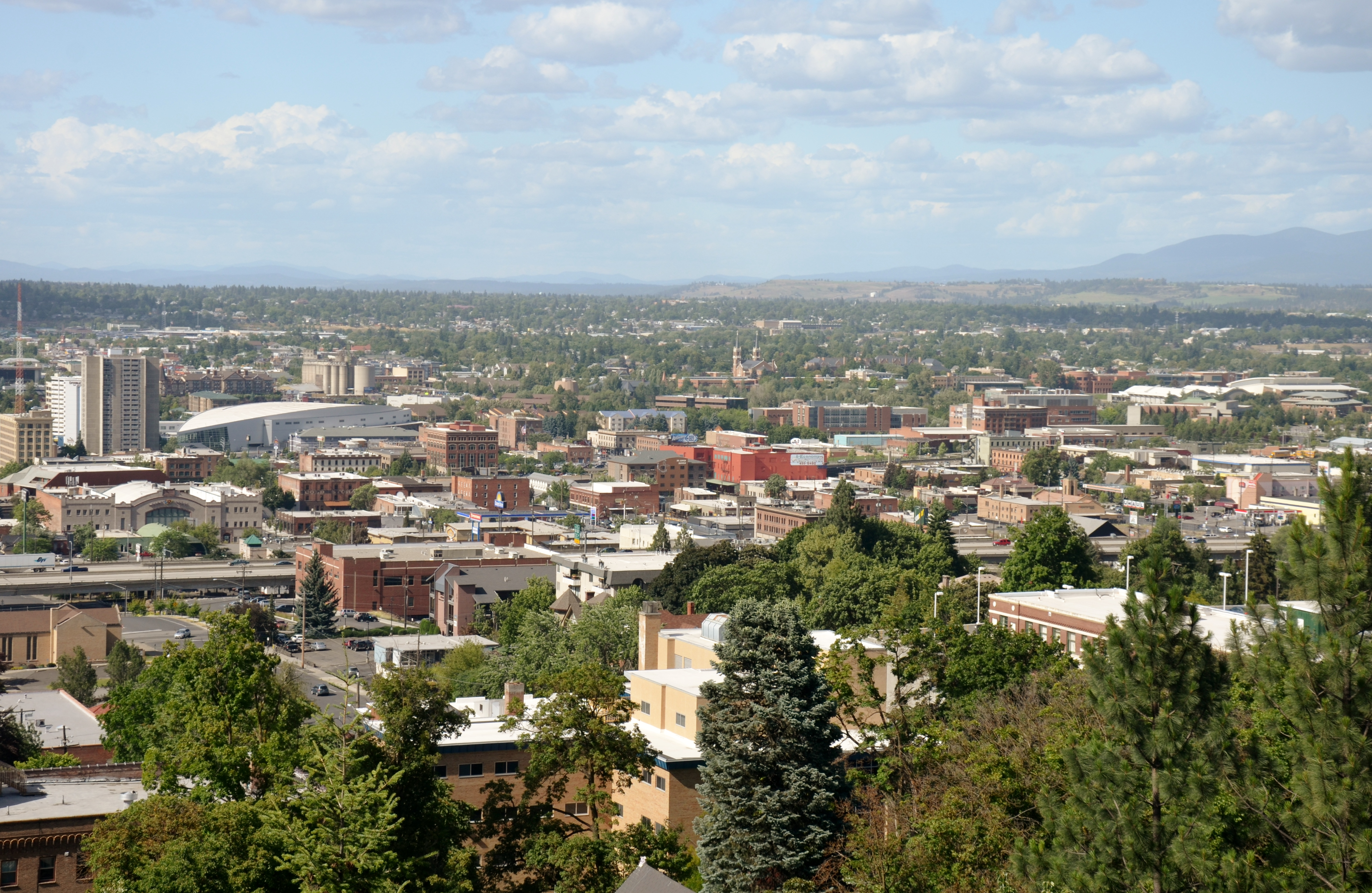
- Cliff/Cannon in the foreground south of Interstate 90

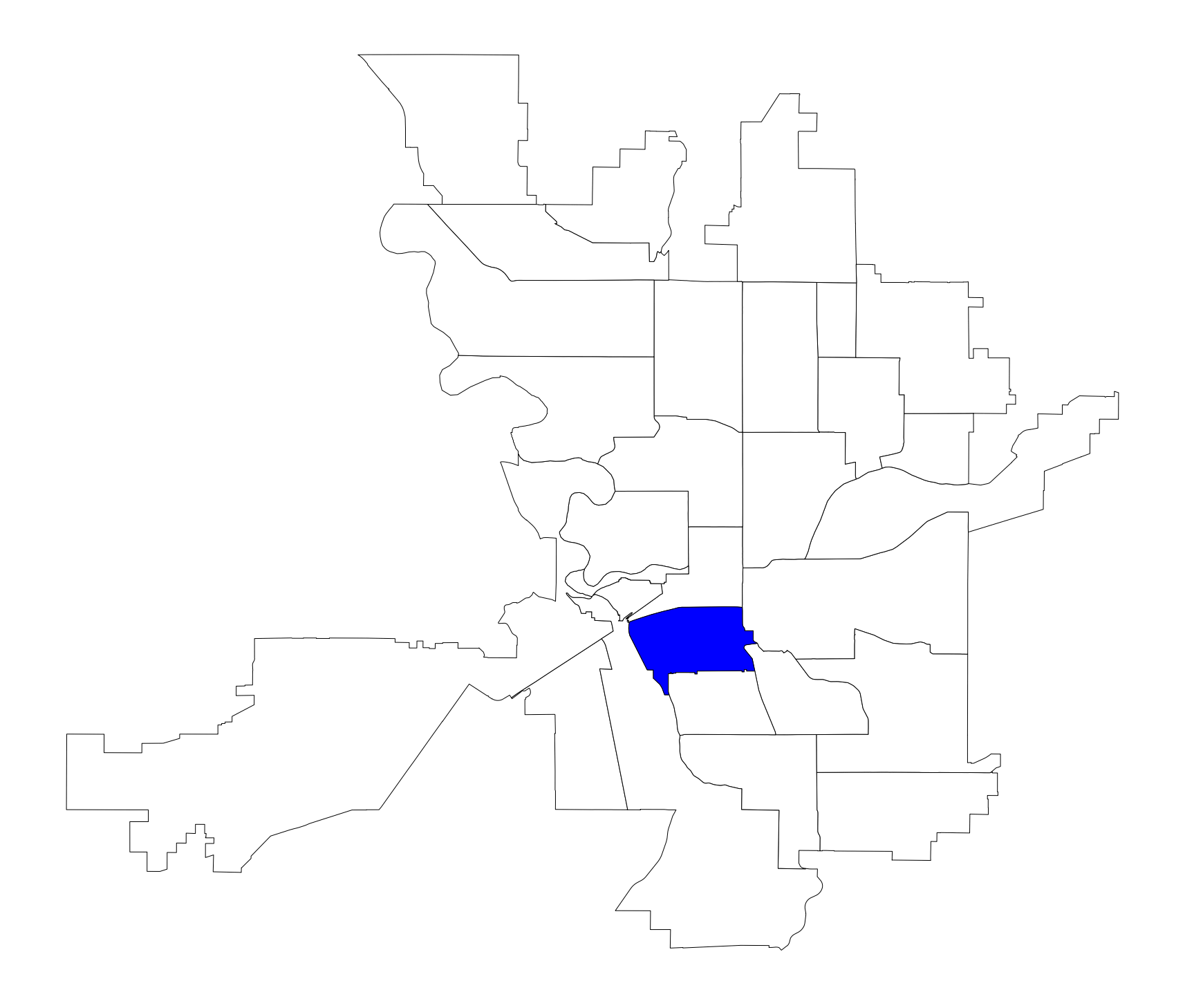
- Location within the city of Spokane
- Coordinates: 47°38′43.5″N 117°25′32.3″W
- Country: United States
- State: Washington
- County: Spokane
- City: Spokane

Population
  - Total: 8,352
- Time zone: UTC-8 (PST)
  - Summer (DST): UTC-7 (PDT)
- ZIP Codes: 99204, 99203
- Area code: 509

Cliff/Cannon is a neighborhood in Spokane, Washington. It is located immediately south of Downtown, Spokane, and on the lower reaches of the broader South Hill. The neighborhood is home to a medical district with Sacred Heart and Deaconess both having their main hospital campuses along Cliff/Cannon's denser northern edge. To the south the neighborhood becomes more residential. City parks break up the residential zoning of the southern half of Cliff/Cannon. It is adjacent to the Cannon Hill area of the neighboring but separate Manito/Cannon Hill neighborhood. The Marycliff-Cliff Park Historic District, a National Historic District listed on the National Register of Historic Places, is located within the neighborhood.

== Geography ==
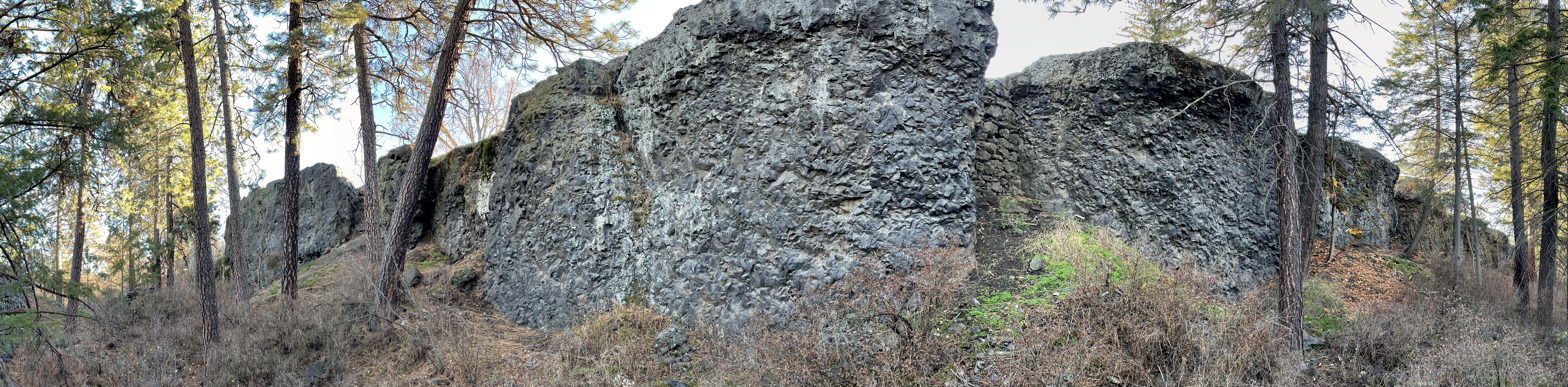
The cliff for which the neighborhood is named

Cliff/Cannon is a neighborhood in Spokane located on the south side of the city. Cliff/Cannon is located directly between the central business district and the more suburban, residential South Hill.

There are multiple medical campuses in the northern portion of the neighborhood, from roughly Monroe Street on the west to Division Street to the east, and extending beyond out of the neighborhood into East Central. This large medical district with the campuses of both Sacred Heart and Deaconess hospitals borders the central business district of Spokane, which lies immediately to the north on the other side of Interstate 90.

Lewis and Clark High School, which serves the neighborhood and broader South Hill area is located between the two hospital campuses, just south of I-90.

The neighborhood is defined by the hillsides on which it is located. The northernmost portion of the neighborhood at Interstate 90 is in the relatively flat valley of the Spokane River. To the south at 16 Avenue, the neighborhood rises above the river to the level of the surrounding Columbia Plateau. On the west the boundary of the neighborhood is defined by the steep hillside dropping down to Latah Creek. Terrain generally increases in elevation as you move northwest to southeast through the neighborhood, with the steepest and most dramatic inclines found on the northern and western areas of Cliff/Cannon.

== History ==
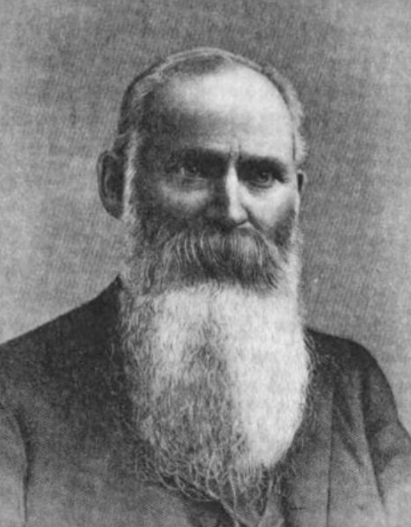
Anthony McCue Cannon (1839–1895)

The Spokane inhabited what is now Cliff/Cannon for hundreds of years before European settlers arrived. The Spokane used the basalt outcroppings in the area as vistas, looking out across the broad valley and plains that surround the area.

The first European settler in what is now Cliff/Cannon was Reverend Henry Thomas Cowley. Cowley, with the help of some of the native Spokane, built a log cabin and school in what is now Cowley Park in the northeastern corner of the neighborhood. The school became a gathering place for the native population.

Development of the neighborhood began to accelerate in 1883, when the western area known as Cannon's Addition was platted by Anthony McCue Cannon. Initial development of Cannon's Addition was focused on wealthy and powerful residents of the nascent city of Spokane. Large mansions were built along the base and crest of the basalt cliff which runs roughly parallel to the Spokane River in downtown. One of the founders of Spokane, James N. Glover built a Tudor Revival mansion below the cliff at 8th and Washington in 1888. Railroad magnate D.C. Glover built a Colonial Revival mansion nearby at 7th and Stevens in 1898. Like many homes in the neighborhood, both were designed by architect Kirtland Cutter, who was a prolific architect in the early decades of Spokane. Both are also listed on the National Register of Historic Places, as is the wider Marycliff-Cliff Park Historic District.

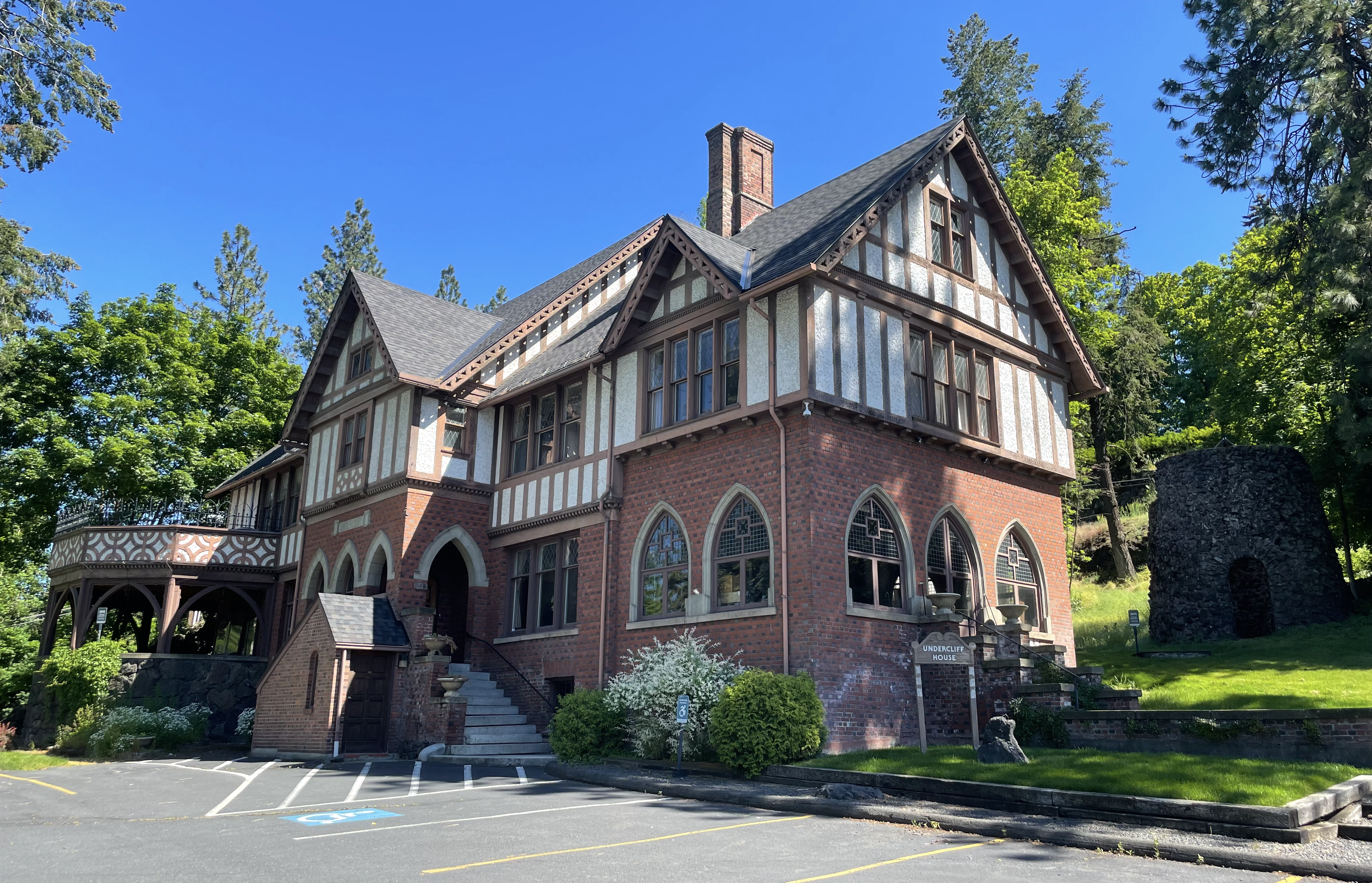
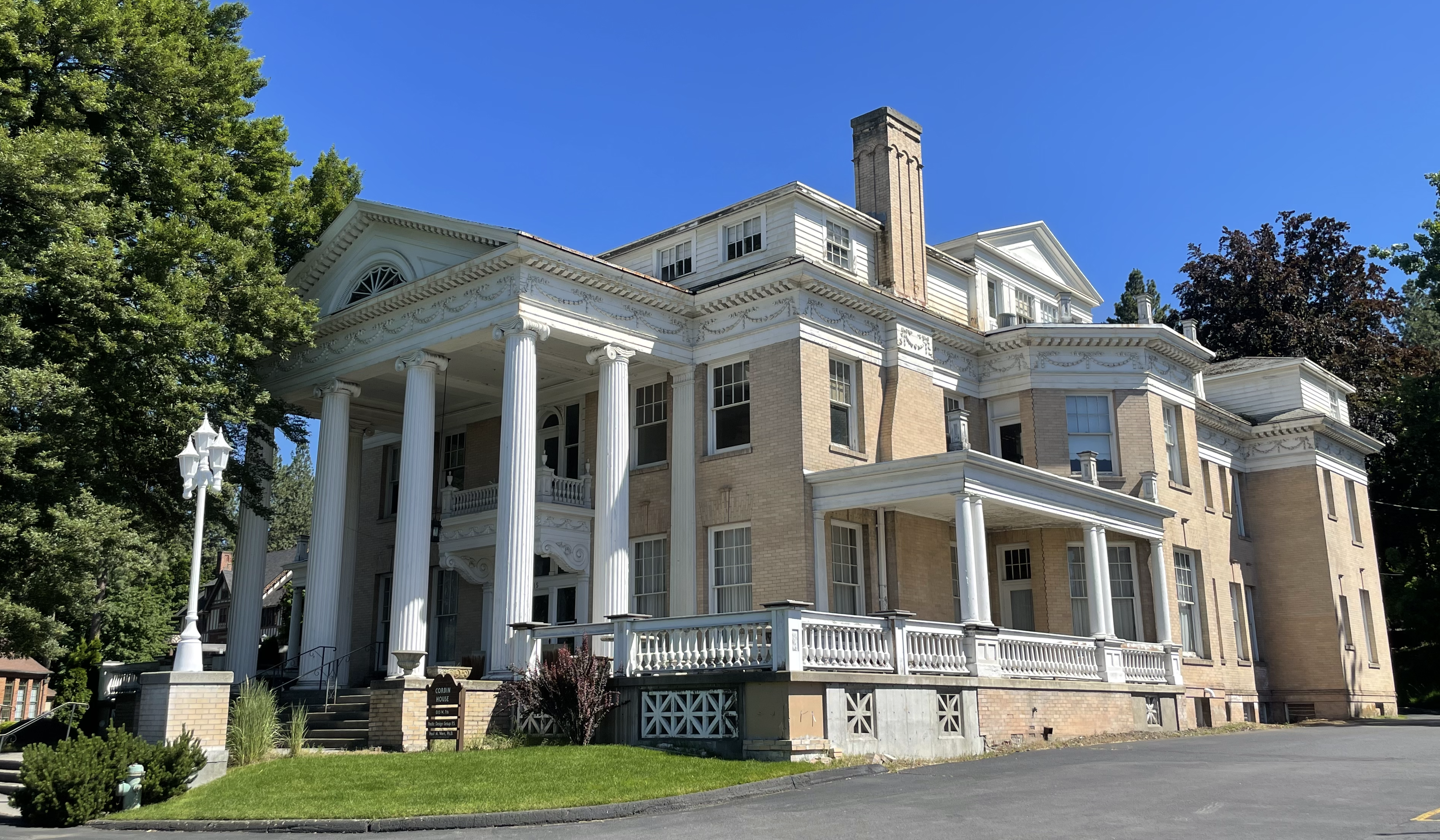
The Undercliff and Corbin House at the Marycliff Center

The school that would eventually become Lewis and Clark was first built at Fourth and Stevens in 1883, and then moved a block away in 1891. The school, originally known as Central High school, then known as South Central High School, to contrast with North Central High School north of the river, burned down in 1910. The school was rebuilt in 1911 in the Collegiate Gothic style and took on its present name of Lewis and Clark. The new school's cornerstone was laid by former President Teddy Roosevelt on April 8, 1911.

In 1904 the Cliff Park section of the neighborhood began to develop around the eponymous 4.5-acre (0.018 km^{2}) park which surrounds a volcanic basalt outcropping that rises above the surrounding area. The first decade of the 1900s also saw development continue in Cannon's Addition to the west. An area along 9th Avenue in Cannon's Addition featuring large Tudor Revival, Queen Anne and neoclassical homes alongside more modest bungalow and Craftsman homes. The Ninth Avenue Historic District is listed on the National Register of Historic Places. Between 1900 and 1910, 264 homes were built in the Cliff Park and Cannon's Addition areas that have remained intact (as of 2021). This explosion in growth was facilitated by the arrival of a streetcar line that made traversing the steep incline of the lower South Hill easier, and thus the neighborhood is an example of a streetcar suburb. Prior to the streetcar, the first being the ill-fated line on the Monroe Street hill built in 1890 which snapped in the winter of 1894 and then the electric line that ran up Cannon Hill along Maple, Madison, Jefferson, and Adams, the neighborhood was overlooked for development in favor of flatter areas in downtown and Browne's Addition. Unlike previous waves of construction, the first decade of the 20th century saw the arrival of less wealthy and minority groups. The neighborhood was one of few areas where African-American and Jewish residents could purchase a home.

In 1931, students from Lewis and Clark High School, which is located in the northern and lower portion of the neighborhood, built a path known as the Tiger Trail, for the school's mascot, up the hill through what is now Edwidge Woldson Park. As of 2018, the path is still used to connect the lower portion of the neighborhood, and the city, with the upper areas. The park was established as Pioneer Park in 1945 when the city purchased the Corbin House and adjacent properties and gardens.

The Park Inn was established at Ninth and Grand in 1932. It has been in continuous operation at that location ever since, making it Spokane's oldest restaurant.

From 1965 to 1971, Interstate 90 was built across the entire northern edge of the neighborhood, resulting in the demolition of many historic structures.

=== Historic places ===
In addition to Marycliff-Cliff Park and Ninth Avenue Historic Districts, Cliff/Cannon is home to 17 other properties listed on the National Register of Historic Places on their own merit.

	Name on the Register	Image	Date listed	Location	Description
1	Dr. Robert and Jessie Bell House	Dr. Robert and Jessie Bell House	August 24, 2005 (#05000921)	917 S. Lincoln St. 47°38′57″N 117°25′27″W	Built in 1908.
2	J. W. Binkley House	J. W. Binkley House	March 31, 1989 (#89000211)	628 S. Maple; 47°39′01″N 117°26′06″W	
3	Breslin	Breslin	February 12, 1987 (#87000095)	S. 729 Bernard; 47°38′56″N 117°24′54″W	Built in 1910.
3	Kenneth and Edna Brooks House	Kenneth and Edna Brooks House	September 15, 2004 (#04001006)	723 W. Sumner Ave. 47°38′48″N 117°25′15″W	Built in 1956.
4	Coolidge-Rising House	Coolidge-Rising House	May 19, 1988 (#88000598)	W. 1405 Ninth Ave. 47°38′50″N 117°25′54″W	Built circa 1906.
5	Corbet-Aspray House	Corbet-Aspray House	November 30, 1999 (#99001454)	820 W. 7th Ave. 47°38′59″N 117°25′22″W	Built in 1908.
6	Daniel C. and Anna Corbin House	Daniel C. and Anna Corbin House	May 10, 2004 (#04000157)	507 W. Seventh Ave. 47°39′02″N 117°25′11″W	Built in 1898.
7	Cowley Park	Cowley Park	February 6, 1973 (#73001891)	S. Division St. between 6th and 7th Aves. 47°38′58″N 117°24′39″W	Built in 1917
8	First Congregational Church of Spokane	First Congregational Church of Spokane	April 26, 1978 (#78002775)	W. 311-329 4th Ave. 47°39′08″N 117°24′59″W	Built in 1890.
9	Glover House	Glover House	August 14, 1973 (#73001892)	W. 321 8th Ave. 47°38′54″N 117°24′57″W	Built circa 1888, this home was designed by Kirtland Cutter.
10	Hill–Hilscher House	Hill–Hilscher House	January 8, 2014 (#13001063)	1638 S. Cedar St. 47°38′22″N 117°25′58″W	
11	Knickerbocker	Knickerbocker	February 12, 1987 (#87000096)	S. 501-507 Howard; 47°39′05″N 117°25′10″W	Built in 1912.
12	Levesque-Majer House	Levesque-Majer House	January 14, 2015 (#14001162)	1708 S. Maple Blvd. 47°38′20″N 117°26′03″W	
13	Lewis and Clark High School	Lewis and Clark High School	December 6, 1990 (#90001860)	W. 521 4th Ave. 47°39′08″N 117°25′09″W	
14	Victor & Jean Piollet House	Victor & Jean Piollet House	December 13, 2010 (#10001019)	606 W. 16th Ave. 47°38′28″N 117°25′15″W	
15	Robinwood Apartments	Robinwood Apartments	March 30, 2005 (#05000248)	209-223 West Ninth Ave. 47°38′57″N 117°24′54″W	Built in 1939.
16	Roosevelt Apartments	Roosevelt Apartments	August 10, 2000 (#00000969)	524 W. Seventh Ave. 47°38′59″N 117°24′59″W	Built in 1929.
17	Lawrence and Lydia Weaver House	Lawrence and Lydia Weaver House	March 13, 2002 (#02000186)	520 W. 16th Ave. 47°38′29″N 117°25′07″W	Built in 1910.

== Demographics ==
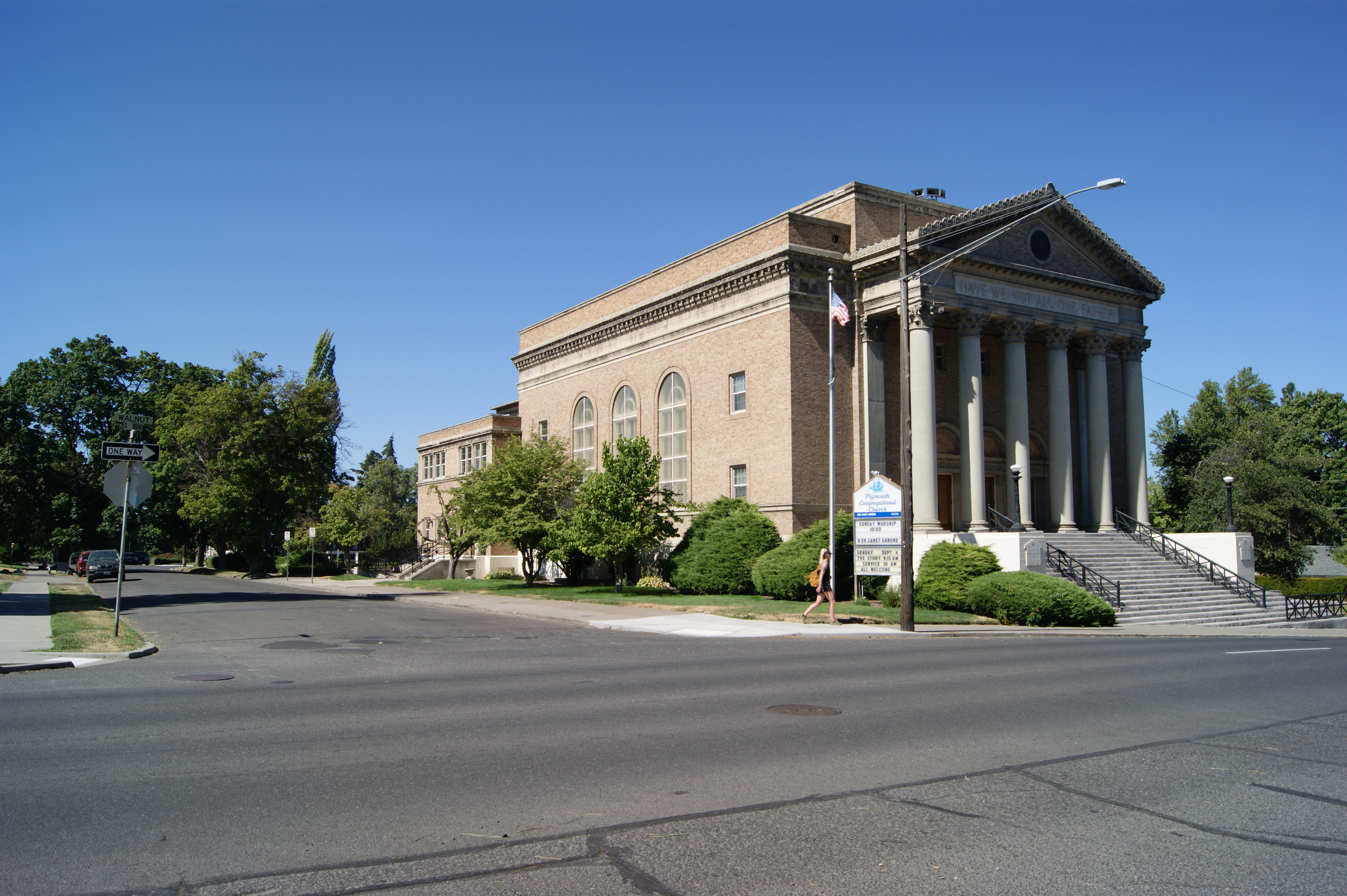
Plymouth Congregational Church

As of 2017, the population of Cliff/Cannon was 8,352 in 4,619 households. 68.8% of those households are rented, compared with 45.3% for the city. 16.8% of Cliff/Cannon residents are 19 years or under, compared to 21.9% citywide. 12.3% are age 65 or above, compared to 14.5% citywide. 22.7% of people in Cliff/Cannon identify as people of color, compared to 15.1% citywide. The median household income in Cliff/Cannon is $33,045, compared to $44,768 for the whole city.

90.8% of residents were born in the United States. Of foreign born residents, 16.4% came from the Philippines, 14% from Burma, 9.3% from Canada and 5.5% from Mexico.

== Education ==
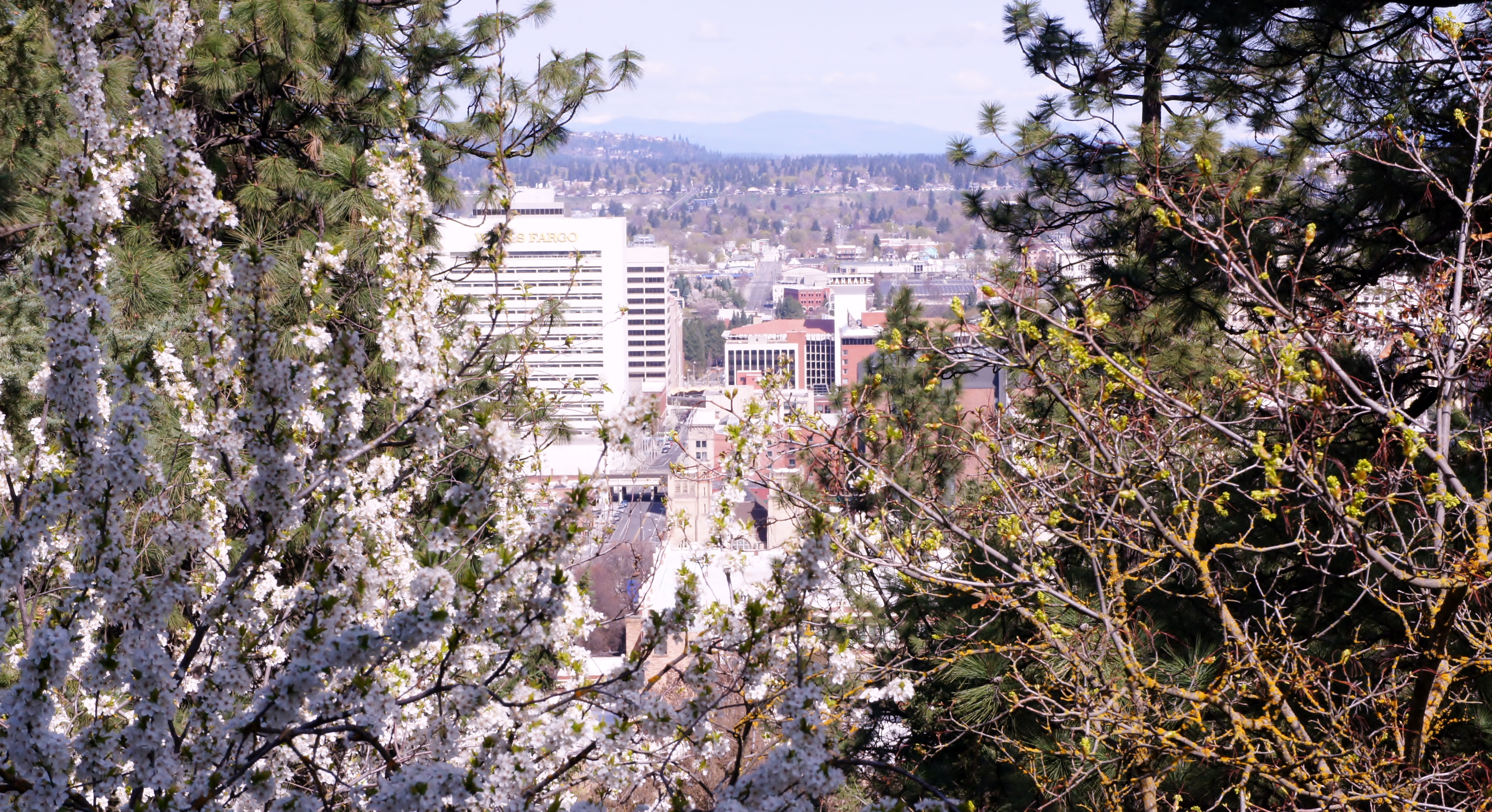
View from the Tiger Trail, named for and often used by students of LCHS

Cliff/Cannon is served by Spokane Public Schools and home to two schools, both public. Roosevelt Elementary is located on 14th Avenue and serves the entire neighborhood with the exception of one square block in the far southwest that is served by Wilson Elementary in the adjacent Manito/Cannon Hill neighborhood. Both schools feed into Sacajawea Middle School in the Comstock neighborhood before feeding into Lewis and Clark High School, which is located on 4th Avenue in Cliff/Cannon.

== Transportation ==
=== Highway ===
- - I-90 - to Coeur d'Alene (east) and Seattle (west)

I-90 passes east–west as the northern boundary of Cliff/Cannon.

- - U.S. 2 - to Newport (east) and Wenatchee (west)

U.S. 2 passes east–west as the northern boundary of Cliff/Cannon concurrent with I-90 to Division Street.

- - U.S. 395 - to Colville (north) and Ritzville (south)

U.S. 395 passes east–west as the northern boundary of Cliff/Cannon concurrent with I-90 to Division Street.

=== Surface Streets ===
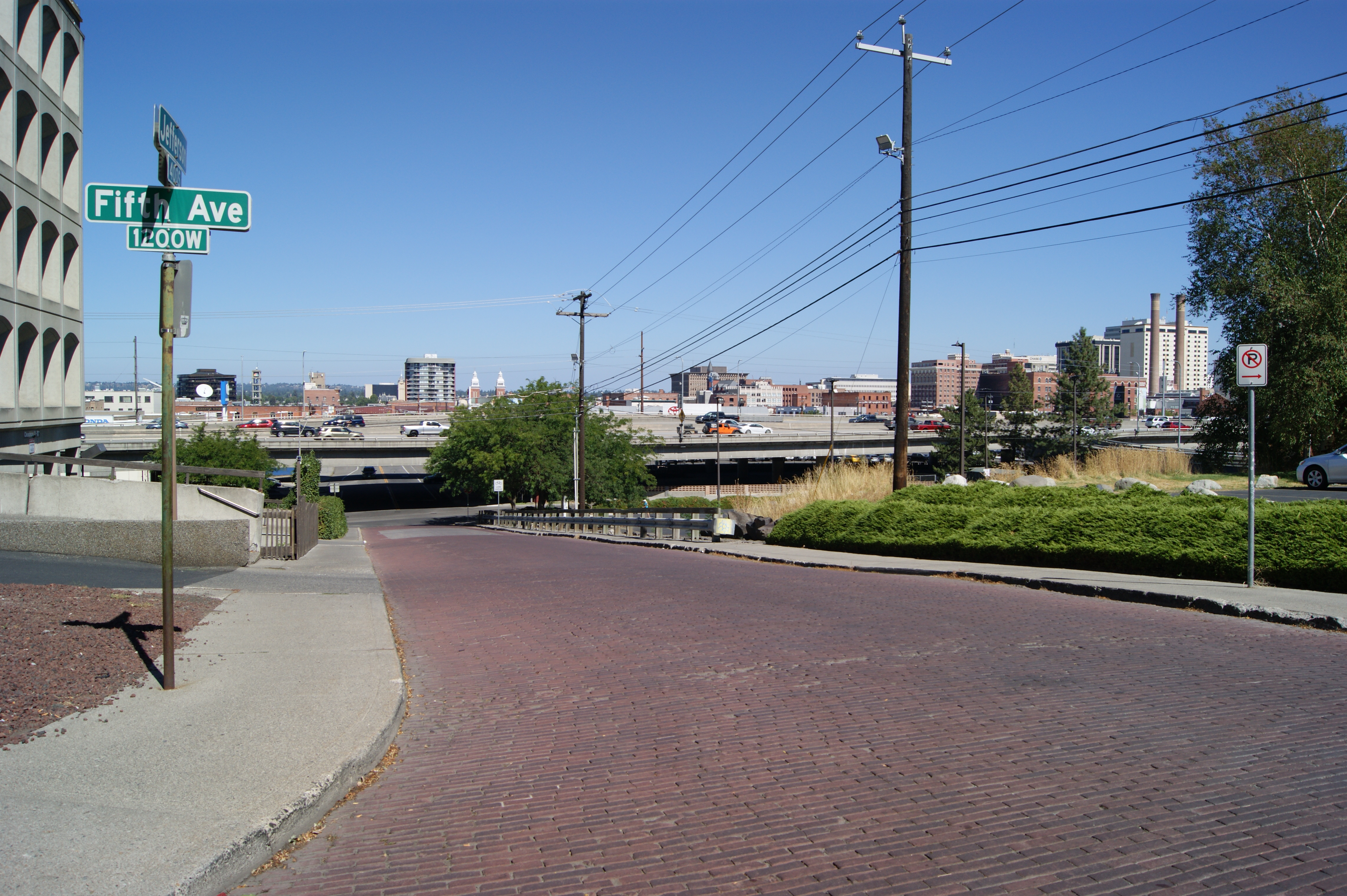
An entrance to the neighborhood just south of downtown and I-90 on Jefferson Street

Interstate 90 defines the northern border of the neighborhood, and has exits at Maple Street, Lincoln Street and Division Street. On ramps are located at Maple Street, Monroe Street and Division Street. U.S. Route 2 runs along a concurrency with I-90 through Cliff/Cannon. The area is somewhat notable for its small concentration of red brick streets. Some of the oldest streets in the city are in the Cliff/Cannon neighborhood on Spokane's lower South Hill, where there are multiple blocks of extant brick roads that were laid in the early 20th century. The exposed brick sections of Madison Street, between Fifth and Sixth Avenue and Eighth and Ninth Avenue were laid down on August 6, 1908. Most of the areas that once had brick streets have been covered by a layer of cheaper-to-maintain asphalt by city maintenance crews over the years and can only be seen when potholes form and expose them.

A pedestrian stairway, known as the Tiger Trail after Lewis and Clark High School's mascot, traverses the cliff through Edwidge Woldson Park from Cliff Drive to Seventh Avenue, three blocks due south of the high school. The trail was constructed in 1931 and is still used to this day by Lewis and Clark students traveling to and from school, as well as the general public.

=== Public Transit ===
Cliff/Cannon, like the rest of the Spokane metropolitan area, has public transit provided by the Spokane Transit Authority. The STA serves Cliff/Cannon with four fixed-route bus lines.

Route	Termini			Service operation and notes	Streets traveled
4; Moran Prairie	Downtown Spokane; STA Plaza	↔	Glenrose; Moran Station Park & Ride	Frequent route	Sprague, Washington/Stevens, 8th/9th, Grand
12; Southside Medical Shuttle	Downtown Spokane; STA Plaza	↔	University District; Gateway Bridge	Shuttle route	Wall, 6th, Bernard, 5th, Division, 7th, McClellan, 8th, Rockwood, Cowley
14; South Adams	Downtown Spokane; STA Plaza	↔	Cliff/Cannon	Regular route	Wall, 5th, Adams, 10th, Madison, 14th, Cedar, 8th
43; Lincoln/37th	Downtown Spokane; STA Plaza	↔	Lincoln Heights; South Hill Park & Ride	Regular route	Maple/Walnut, 14th, Lincoln
