= Providence Sacred Heart Medical Center and Children's Hospital =

Providence Sacred Heart Medical Center & Children's Hospital
- Providence Health Care
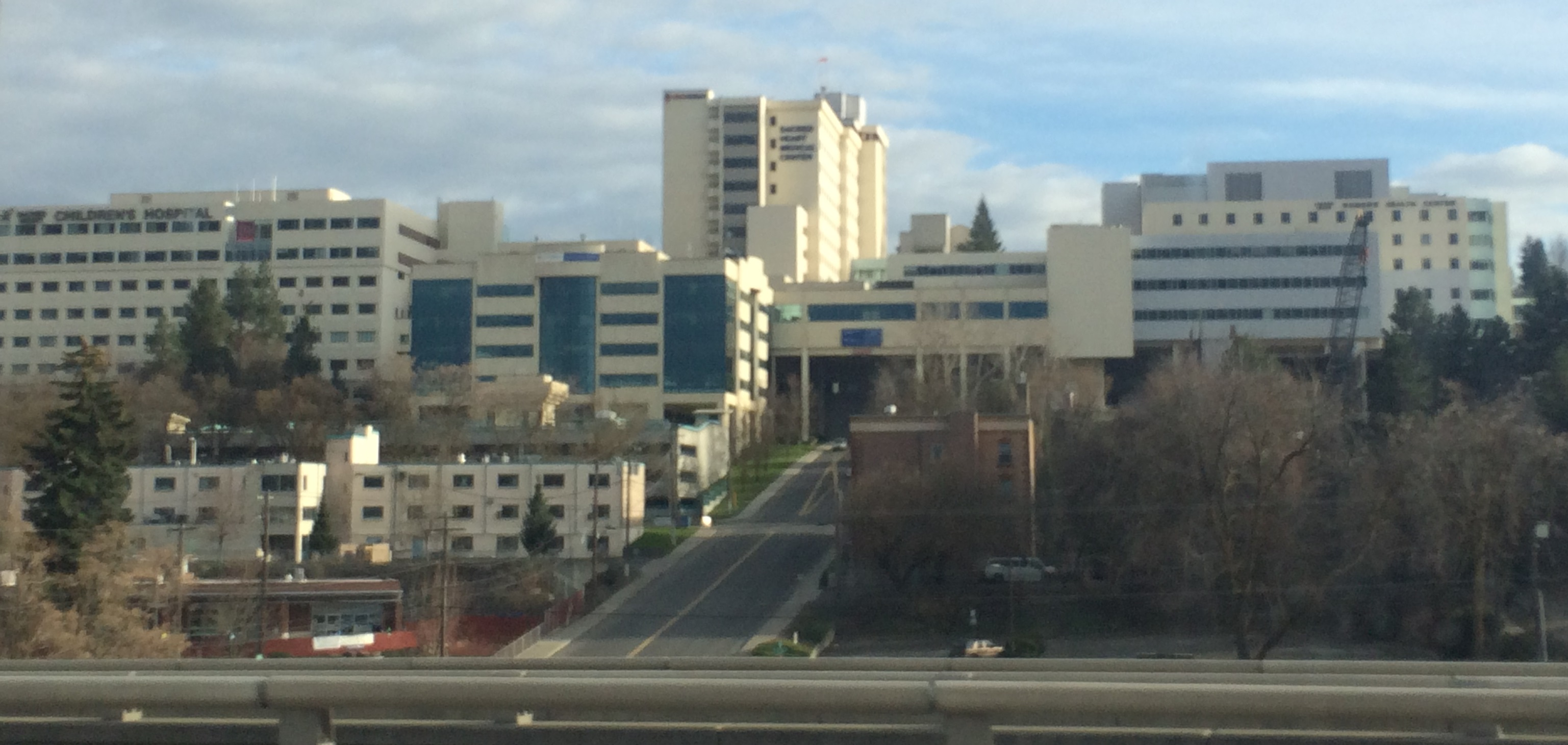
- Sacred Heart Medical Center in 2017

Geography
- Location: 101 West Eighth Avenue, Spokane, Washington, United States
- Coordinates: 47.649°N 117.413°W

Organization
- Care system: Public, Medicaid, Medicare
- Type: General
- Religious affiliation: Catholic
- Affiliated university: Washington State University

Services
- Standards: Joint Commission
- Emergency department: II
- Beds: 648

Helipads
- Helipad: FAA LID: 05WA

History
- Founded: 1886; 140 years ago

Links
- Website: www.shmc.org
- Lists: Hospitals in Washington state

Providence Sacred Heart Medical Center & Children's Hospital (more commonly known as Sacred Heart Medical Center or simply Sacred Heart) is a 648-bed general hospital in Spokane, Washington. It employs more than 4,000 health care professionals and support staff; its medical staff consists of over 800 specialists and primary care doctors.

Services Include: main medical center/ER, children's hospital, women's health center, specialized centers for robotic and minimally invasive surgery, cardiology, orthopedic surgery, stroke center, neuroscience and cancer. Sacred Heart is rated as a "high performing" hospital in ten adult procedures and conditions according to U.S. News & World Report.

== History ==
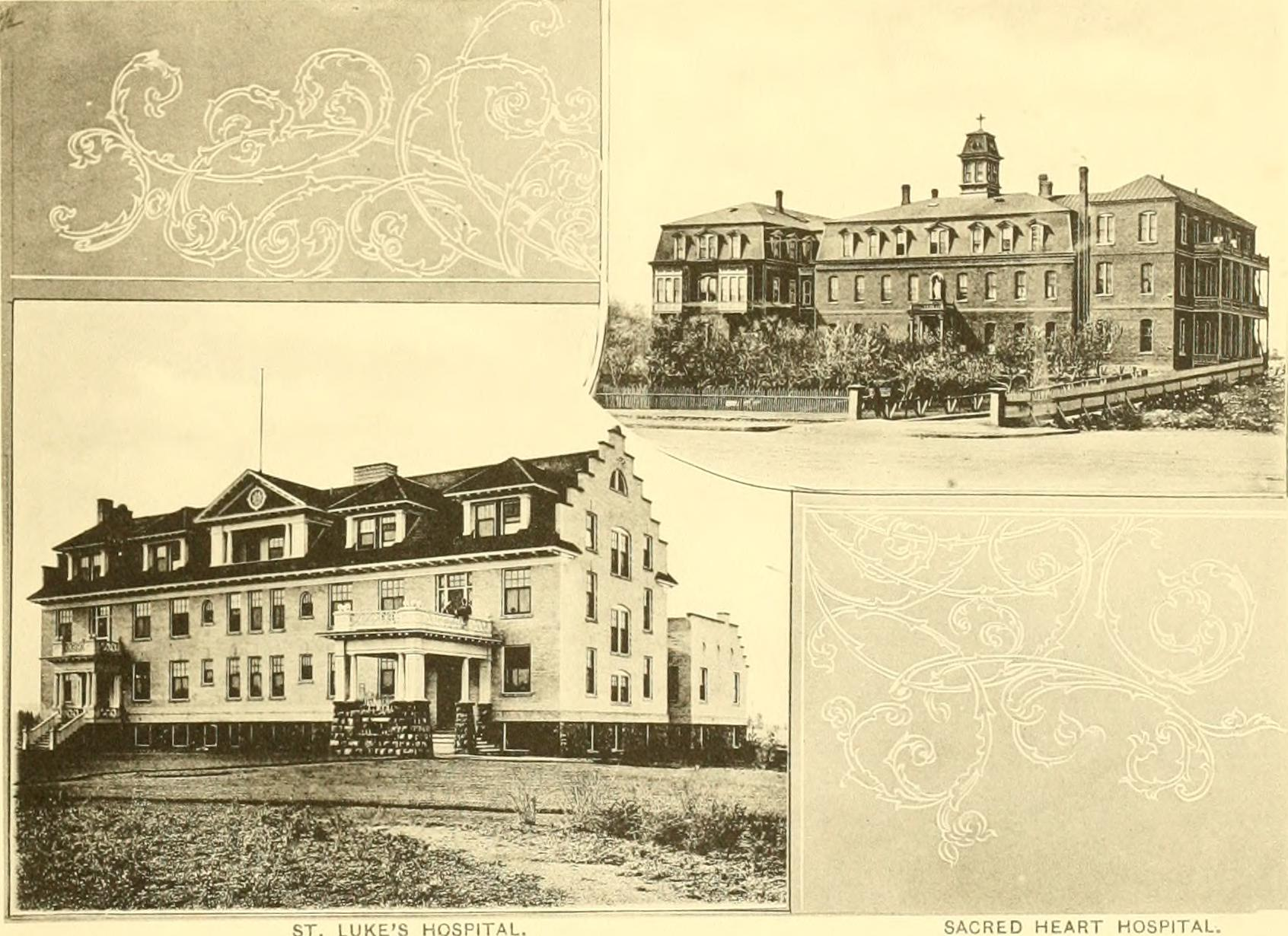
The original hospital (right)

Heeding the call of Fr. Joseph Cataldo, a Jesuit father, Mother Joseph of the Sacred Heart and Sister Joseph of Arimathea, two Sisters of Providence, traveled from Vancouver, Washington, at the end of April 1886 to survey sites where they could establish a hospital in Spokane. On May 14, 1886, the Corporation of the Sisters of Providence agreed to build and within days ground was broken and construction under way at a site on the south bank of the Spokane River at Front Street between Browne and Bernard in what was then known as Spokane Falls. When the cornerstone was being blessed on July 2, 1886 (the feast of the Sacred Heart), the bishop of Nisqually, Aegidius Junger, asked for the name of the hospital. As no name had been received from the General Administration in Montreal at that point, the sisters had no name to give. The hospital received its name when a priest piped in: "It will be Sacred Heart Hospital."

The hospital formally opened on January 27, 1887, but the sisters received their first patient, a blacksmith by the name of John Cox, on January 15. Three days after his admittance, Mr. Cox also became the hospital's first death. As Spokane's population grew, so too did the number of sick, injured, and poor: the sisters’ works were quickly outgrowing the original building so a new wing was added in 1889.

Sacred Heart was the region's first hospital, a 31-bed, wood-framed structure built along the Spokane River where the Spokane Convention Center now stands. It quickly outgrew its first location and in 1910, it was moved (as well as expanded) to its current location on Spokane's South Hill.

The present Sacred Heart Medical Center's nine-story patient tower was built in 1971. By 1984 the new East addition housed psychiatric, outpatient, radiology, and pediatric surgery services. More recent campus developments include the Spokane Heart Institute (1991), the expansion of the Sacred Heart Doctor's Building (1993), and Emilie Court, an assisted living facility (2000). Responding to requests from the medical community, and supported by the community leaders and families, Sacred Heart Children's Hospital, the region's first full-service Children's Hospital opened in 2003. The fall of 2004 saw the opening of the Women's Health Center and Surgery Center, West Tower addition. A special pathogens unit was constructed in 2015 in the east addition with federal funding to host people with highly infectious diseases.

With the outbreak of the COVID-19 pandemic in early 2020, Providence Sacred Heart Medical Center was one of the first hospitals to receive COVID-19 patients due to its Special Pathogens Unit. The unit was established in 2015 as one of 10 regional treatment facilities for the National Emerging Special Pathogens Training and Education Center (NETEC).

== Campus ==
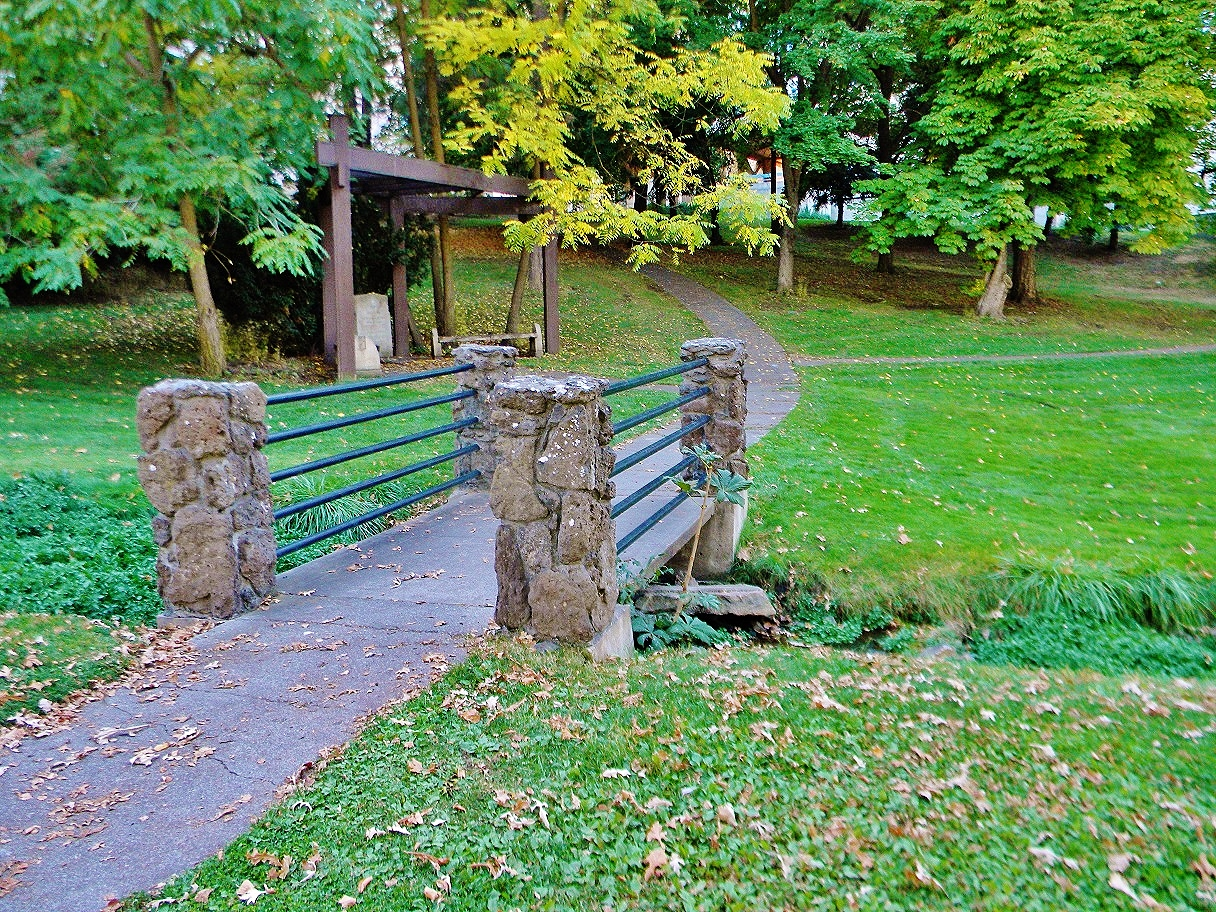
Cowley Park

Located in Spokane's Cliff/Cannon neighborhood in what is referred to locally as the "Medical District," Sacred Hearts growing campus and its immediate surroundings include ancillary services such as assisted living residences, hotels, a Center for Faith and Healing garden, as well as a public park called Cowley Park. Cowley Park is on the National Register of Historic Places and is the former site of the Reverend Henry T. Cowley home when he arrived in 1874 and the areas first public school. Three trees he planted, a maple, ash, and a sycamore still stand.

=== Mary's Place ===
Although not a part of the campus, a private family residence was almost entirely encircled by the hospital complex, just south of the neighboring Women's Health Center until 2024. This four-story home was called "Mary's Place," after Mary Gianetsas, who lived in the house until her death in the hospital next door in 1991; Mary, an immigrant from Greece, purchased the home in 1944 for $20,000 ($365,784 in 2025 dollars) and resisted the pressure to sell the property for 50 years from the expanding hospital. She had rebuffed an initial offer of $200,000 in 1960 ($2.18 million in 2025 dollars) when Sacred Heart had planned a major expansion with a new patient tower, the resistance to sell has resulted in campus redesigns-causing unusual architectural decisions and challenges to design around. Mary's son, George told the press that "she loved that house...she just did not want to sell it...that's where she wanted to die." The home was demolished in 2024 to make way for a parking lot. The owner at the time of demolition, Diamond Parking, purchased the property for $4.5 million. After demolition of the main house in May 2024, all that remains of the structure is the carriage house, which will be converted into a rental property for traveling nurses.

== Services ==
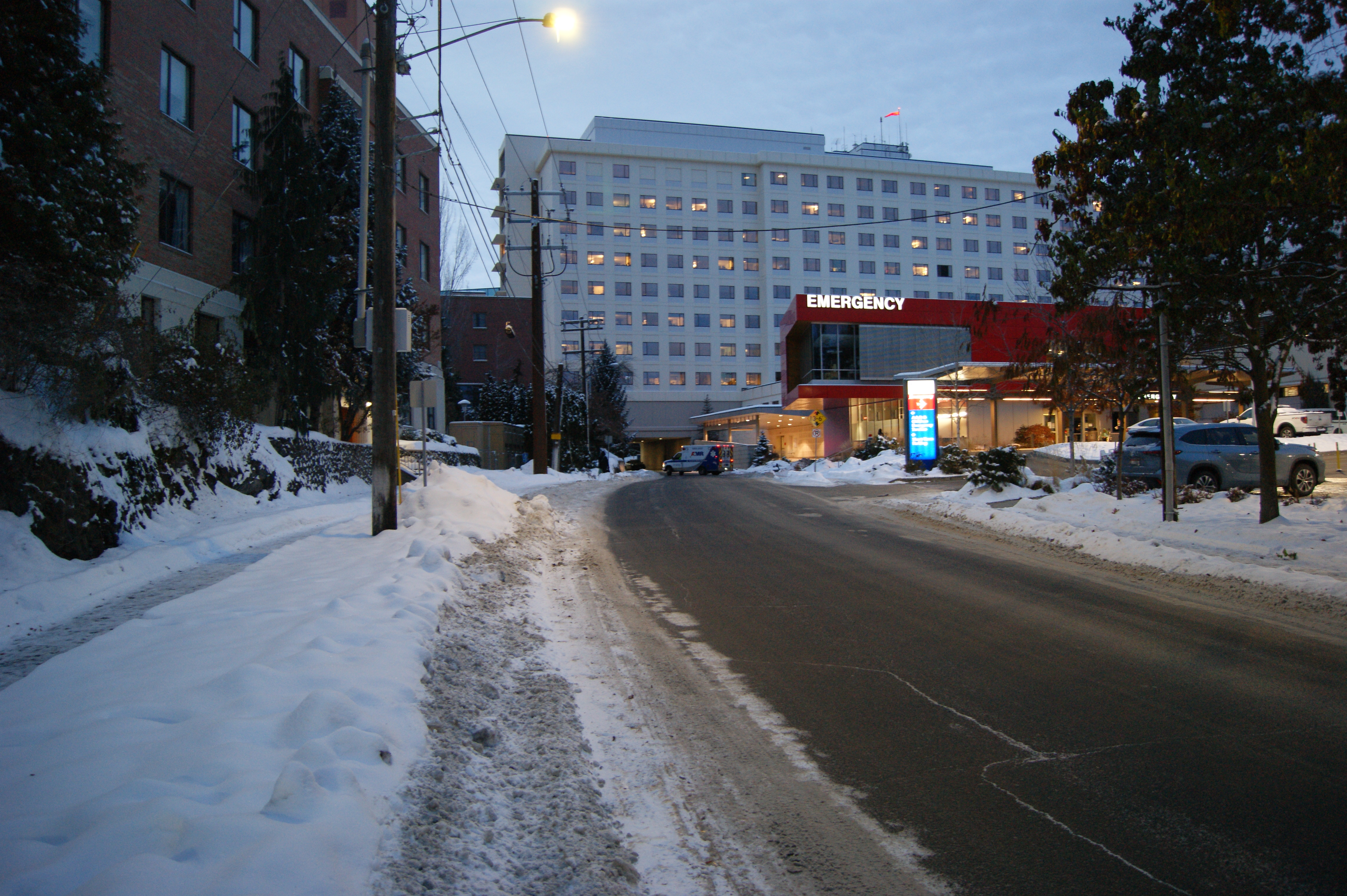
The ER with an EMS vehicle pulling out of the ambulance bay

The hospital is equipped with the staff and resources to operate a level II adult and pediatric trauma center, the only such center in the Inland Northwest. Sacred Heart also has a Level IV regional Neonatal Intensive Care Unit. The Providence Spokane Heart Institute retains specialized physicians with expertise that encompass all aspects of cardiovascular care and work to enhance and pioneer new diagnostic testing, medications, interventions and surgical techniques and hence are referred difficult cases from elsewhere in the region.

Sacred Heart is the designated special pathogens unit for the Pacific Northwest and is one of ten such units in the country with federal certifications to treat highly infectious diseases. The facilities were used to treat people during the Western African Ebola virus epidemic and four passengers from the stranded-in-port Diamond Princess cruise ship in 2020 during the early stages of the COVID-19 pandemic.

Sacred Heart performs heart, lung, kidney and pancreas organ transplants.

== Affiliations ==
Other affiliated institutions are located nearby the hospital campus such as the Providence St. Luke's Rehabilitation Medical Center, as well Inland Northwest Behavioral Health, a Universal Health Services facility that is a joint venture between Providence Health Services and Fairfax Behavioral Health of Kirkland, Washington.

Sacred Heart has a long relationship with the Washington State University College of Pharmacy on the WSU Spokane campus and since the inception of the Elson S. Floyd College of Medicine, the hospital has hosted a residency program that offers a teaching certificate. As of June 2020, the hospital had 72 interns and residents.

== See also ==
- Deaconess Hospital
