= Moore-Turner Garden =

- Moore-Turner Heritage Gardens
- U.S. Historic district – Contributing property
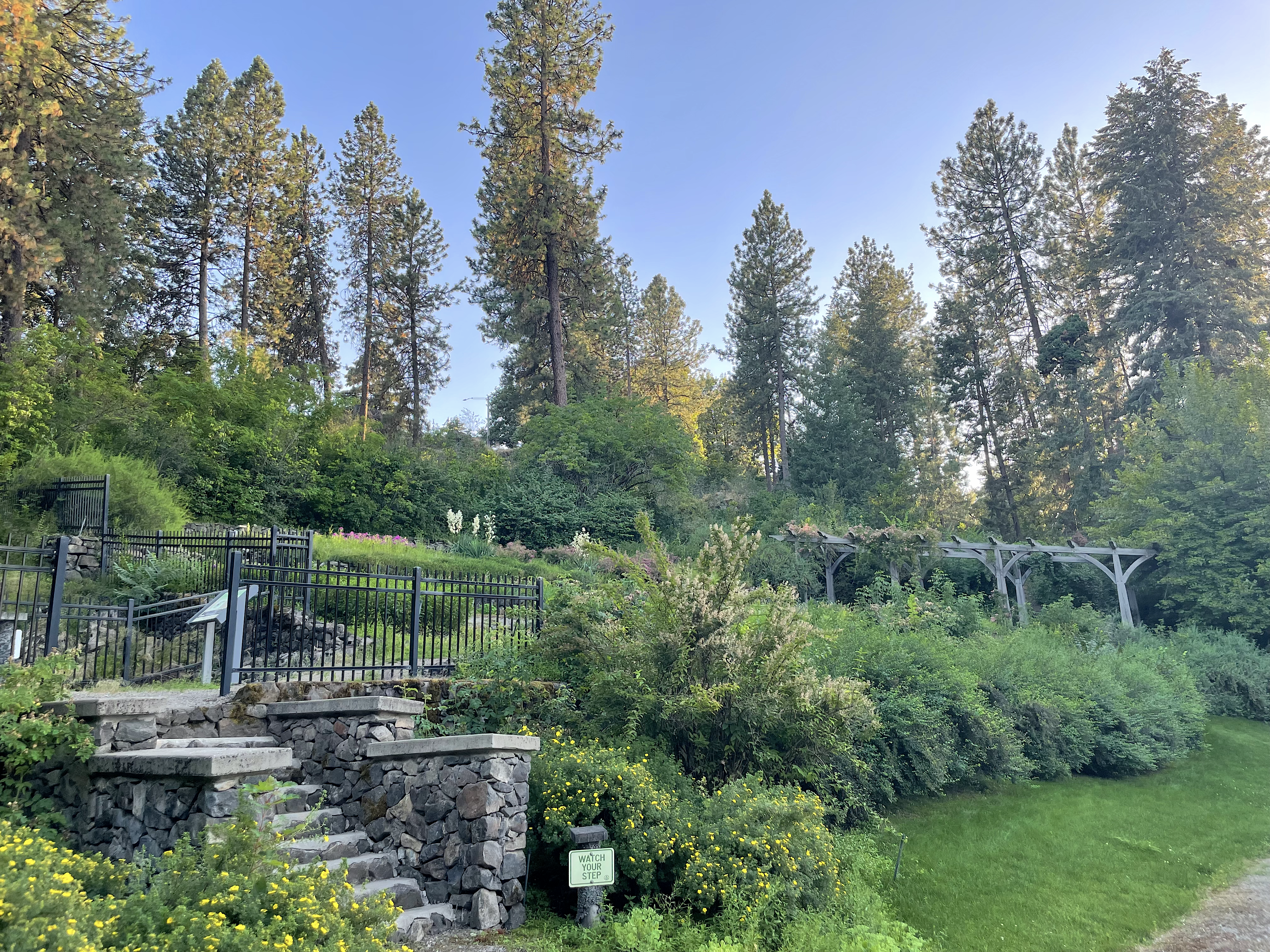
- The gardens in August 2022

- Location within Spokane riverfront area
- Location: 525 W 7th Avenue, Spokane, Washington
- Coordinates: 47.6481°N 117.4209°W
- Area: 120 acres (49 ha)
- Built: 1889
- Landscape architect: Hugh Bryan (1888-1891)
- Architectural style: Arts and Crafts
- Part of: Marycliff-Cliff Park Historic District (ID79002557)
- Added to NRHP: December 21, 1979

The Moore-Turner Heritage Gardens are located in Edwidge Woldson Park, in Spokane's Cliff/Cannon neighborhood. Built between 1889 and 1932 as a residential garden for original property owner, Frank Rockwood Moore, on the grounds of his home, the property was later acquired by United States Senator George Turner in 1896. Turner hired Hugh Bryan in 1911 to make improvements to the Victorian-influenced design following the then popular Arts and Crafts movement.

In 1945, the Spokane Park Board bought the property and combined it with the D.C. Corbin property to the east to form Pioneer Park, as it was then known. The gardens, maintained by the City of Spokane Parks and Recreation Department, opened to public use in 2007 following a three-year restoration project funded through donations, grants, and a major donation from Myrtle Woldson. The gardens include plants introduced prior to 1915, a tea house, a rose garden, perennial garden, and a pond. The historic garden is a contributing property to the Marycliff-Cliff Park Historic District on the National Register of Historic Places and in 2008, it won the Valerie Sivinski Award for Outstanding Achievement in Historic Preservation from the Washington State Department of Archaeology and Historic Preservation.
