= Marycliff-Cliff Park Historic District =

- U.S. National Register of Historic Places
- U.S. Historic district
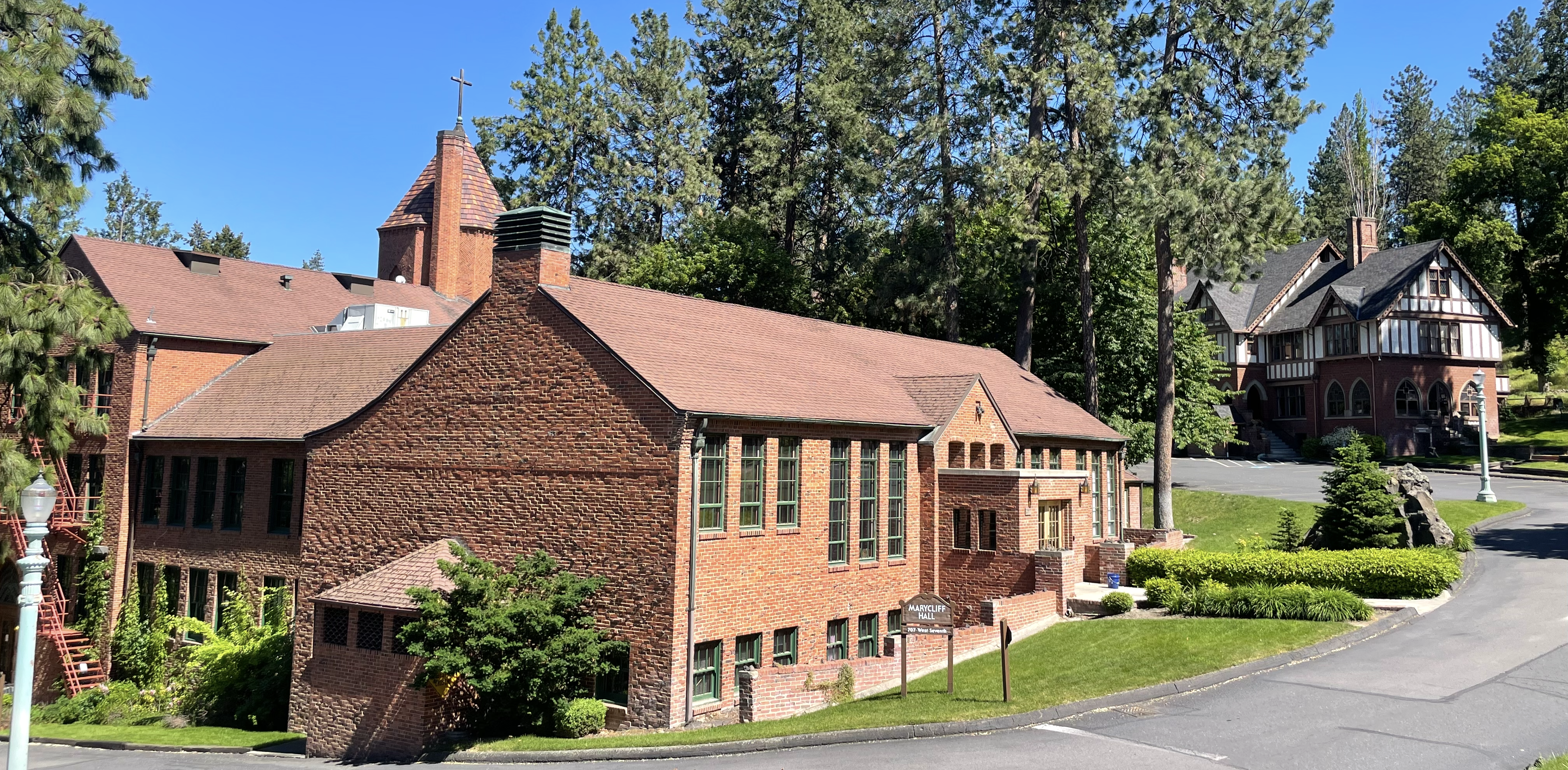
- Marycliff Hall and Undercliff House

- Location within Spokane riverfront area Location within Washington (state) Location within the United States
- Location: Cliff/Cannon, Spokane, Washington
- Coordinates: 47°38′45″N 117°25′17″W
- Area: 120 acres (49 ha)
- Built: 1889-1941
- Architect: Multiple
- Architectural style: Tudor Revival, Georgian Revival, Bungalow, International Style, Spanish Colonial Revival
- NRHP reference No.: 79002557
- Added to NRHP: December 21, 1979

The Marycliff-Cliff Park Historic District is a historic residential area in the Cliff/Cannon neighborhood of Spokane, Washington, located immediately uphill from the city's downtown core, listed on the National Register of Historic Places (NRHP). The district is made up of two distinct but connected areas, the Marycliff section located at the base of a basalt cliff and south of Seventh Avenue, and the Cliff Park section located atop the cliff and north of 14th Avenue. Encroachment from the nearby city center has changed the nature of the Marycliff section over the decades. Of the palatial homes built in the late 1800s in the area, all have either been converted to commercial or public use or razed to make way for new development, though there are still a number of properties that are intact and reflect the historic nature of the area. The Cliff Park section retains its original residential character and historic nature, with only 11 properties listed as intrusive among the 118 properties in the area.

Built between 1889 and 1941, the historic district is home to numerous architectural styles. Examples of Jacobethan Revival, Georgian Revival, Bungalow, International Style and Spanish Colonial Revival structures can be found in the district. There are a handful of modern intrusions in the area, including the Kenneth and Edna Brooks house built in 1956, which was listed individually on the NRHP on its own merit in 2004. The property is interesting as it is considered an intrusion to the historic district, but historic enough on its own nonetheless to have been listed on the NRHP.

The historic district's location along and atop a cliff overlooking the city center played a prominent role in its development. Wealthy residents in the then nascent city of Spokane built mansions in the Browne's Addition neighborhood, along flat land just west of downtown. When space began to run out there, construction of homes for wealthy and prominent residents shifted to the area south of the city center in what is now the Marycliff area of the district, and later up the cliff to the Cliff Park section. Numerous high-profile architects designed homes in the district, including Kirtland Cutter, who built homes along Cliff Drive to resemble scaled down versions of English country manors. Other architects including Waterhouse & Price, Karl Malmgren, Albert Held and G.A. Pehrson, among others, designed homes in the district.

== Marycliff ==
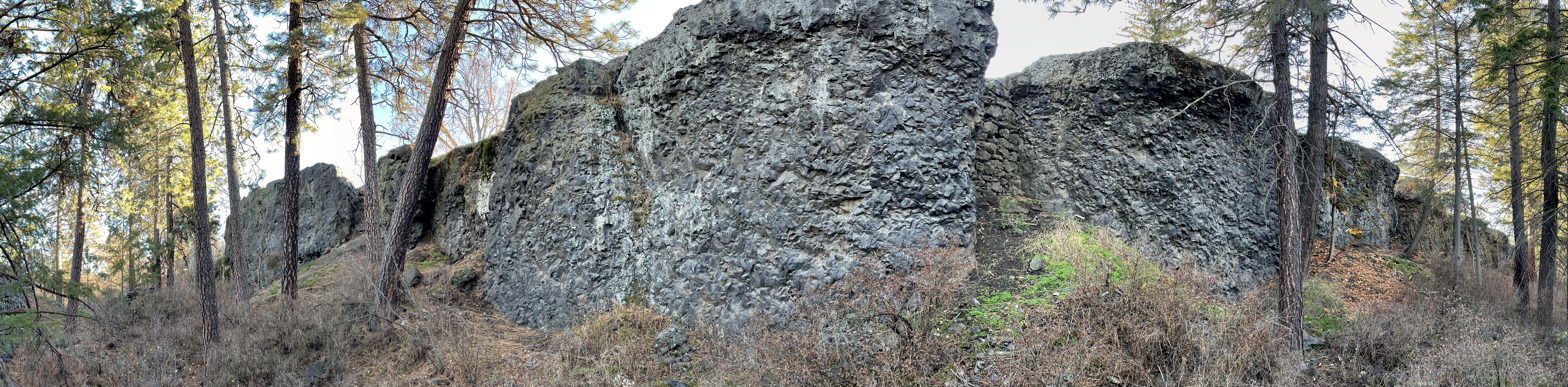
The Cliff for which the area is named

The Marycliff section of the historic district is located on sloping land below a basalt cliff on the bottom flank of Spokane's South Hill. It is closer to the city center than the Cliff Park section above, and being below the cliff was more easily integrated into the city at the time. As such, it is the older of the two sections of the historic district. Development in the area began in the late 1880s and it quickly became one of Spokane's most elite neighborhoods, home to many of the young city's most prominent and wealthy families. Homes in the area were built facing northward, down the hill, which offered commanding views of the city center below as well as the surrounding terrain for miles around.

Its location helped spur its growth in its early decades during Spokane's "Age of Elegance" from the late 1880s until World War I. Homes built in the area were massive in scale, grandiose in appearance, and luxurious in function. Homes of that nature were constructed through the 1920s along the hillside from Sixth Avenue to Eighth Avenue. However, its location would eventually lead to a change in the neighborhood's character. By the 1940s, expansion of the city center had steadily crept into Marycliff. At that time, almost every mansion in Marycliff had been converted from single-family use and many had been razed altogether to make way for newer development. As a result, the historic district's boundaries reach no further down the hill than Seventh Avenue, as the historic character of the area below had become so diminished.

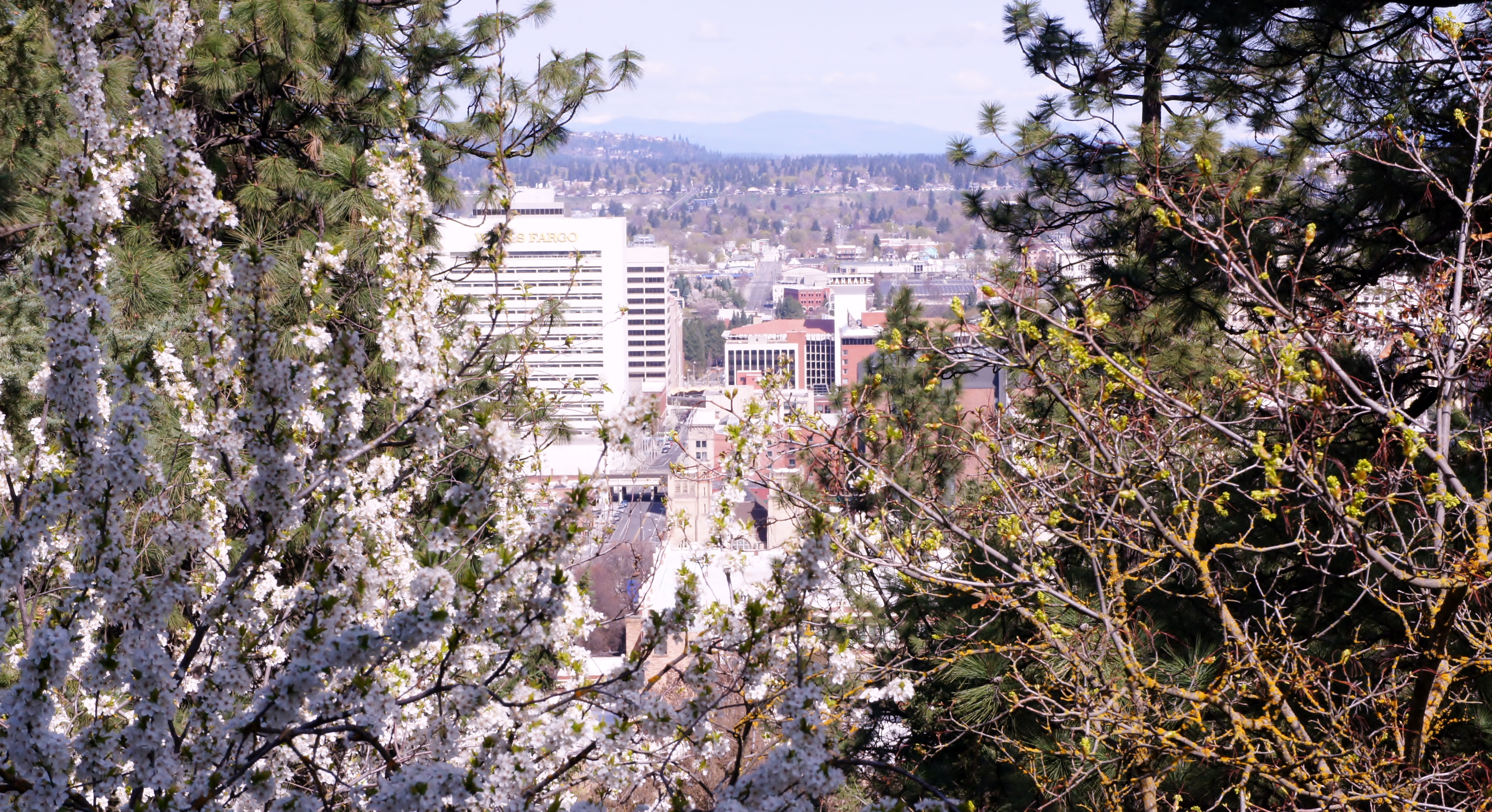
Spring view from the Tiger Trail, which scales the cliff in Edwidge Woldson Park

From the late 1920s into the mid-1940s, efforts were made to preserve the remaining mansions. Owners of homes in the west of Marycliff gave their mansions to the Catholic Church, which absorbed the structures into the all-girls Marycliff High School campus. After the closure of the school in 1979, the campus was renovated and restored during a conversion into an office park. The two remaining mansions as well as the gatehouse are as of 2022 used for that purpose. On the east side of Marycliff, the Corbin property was donated to the city on condition that it be maintained for public use. While the adjacent Moore-Turner home was demolished in 1940, its gardens were left intact, and eventually restored in 2005. Those two properties became Pioneer Park in 1945, named in honor of the pioneering founders of the city who previously lived in the area. The park was renamed Edwidge Woldson Park in 2010. The Park stretches from just west of Howard Street east one block to Stevens Street, though its southern half extends eastward in a wedge shape between the cliff above and Ben Garnett Way below. Cliff Drive, which runs along the crest of the cliff, marks its southern boundary, beyond which is the Cliff Park section of the district.

=== Pivotal properties ===
==== Corbin House ====
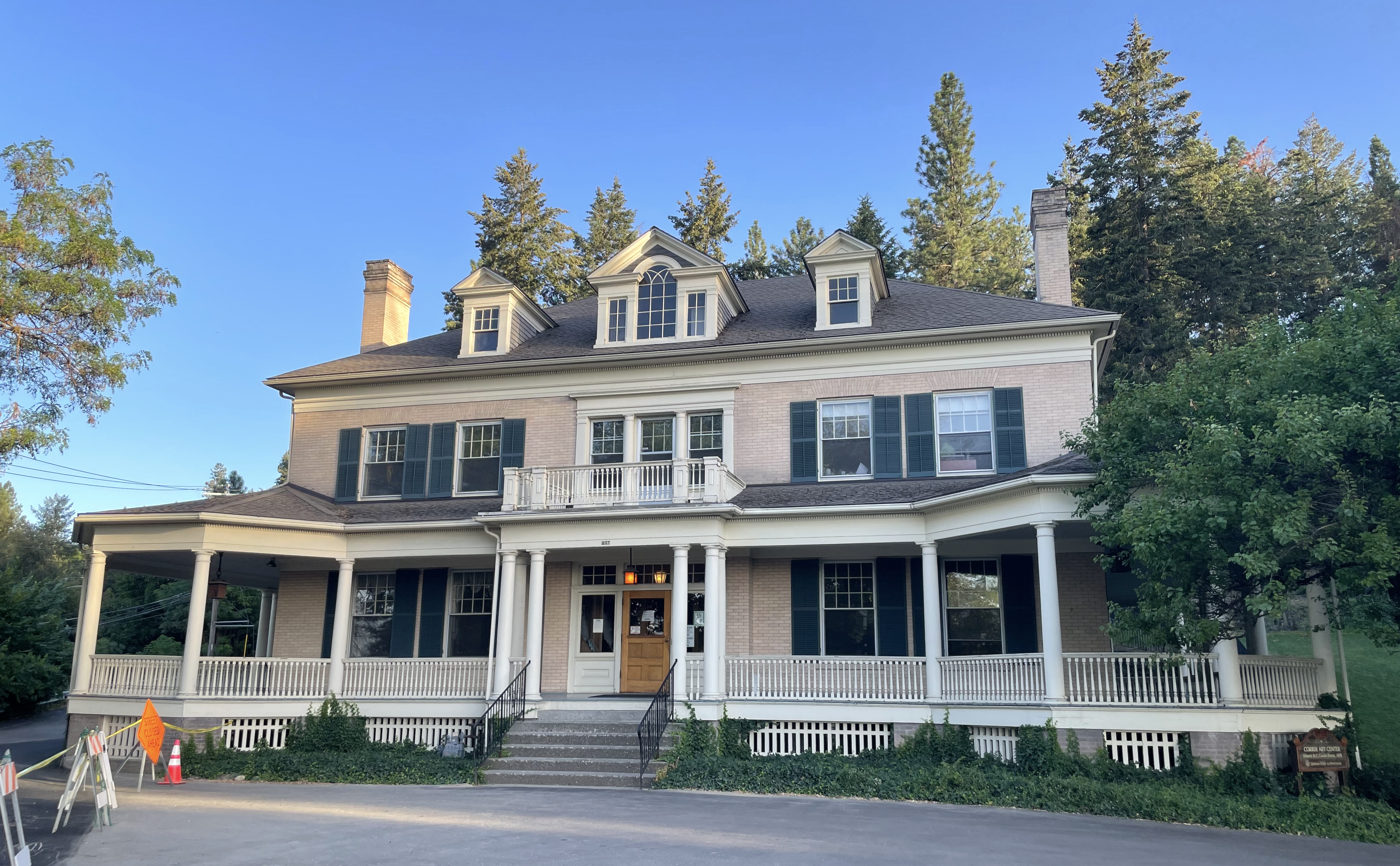
Corbin House in August 2022

Located at 507 W Seventh Ave., the Daniel C. and Anna Corbin House, more commonly known as the Corbin House or Corbin Art Center, is a Colonial Revival home built in 1898 and designed by Kirtland Cutter. The former home is now used by the city as a community center known as the Corbin Art Center. The two-and-one-half story structure is made of tan brick with wooden trim. Its northern elevation looks out over the city center with a symmetrical façade behind a wrap-around porch contained behind balustrades and Tuscan columns. The original property was five-and-one-half acres on a rectangular lot stretching from Seventh Avenue south to Cliff Drive, though the construction of Ben Garnett Way in the 1960s resulted in the loss of one acre on the northeastern corner of the lot. The grounds slope along a grassy lawn to the north. Behind the house the slope increases and the grounds are forested and dotted with basalt outcroppings before ultimately reaching the basalt cliff which gives the area its name. It is located to the immediate east of the Moore-Turner property, which is now the Moore-Turner Heritage Gardens.

The home was built for Spokane mining and railroad magnate Daniel C. Corbin. Corbin settled in Spokane in 1889 and quickly became one of the young city's most successful businessmen. Corbin's fortunes were made through his network of railroads which connected the mining districts in the nearby Silver Valley of North Idaho and the Kootenays of British Columbia with the commercial center of Spokane. The railroads were not only a financial success for Corbin, but brought wealth and prominence to the city as a whole. Corbin married his second wife, Anna Louise Larson of Sweden in 1907. She was 33 years old, and he was 75. When Daniel died in 1918, the home was left to Anna, along with investments that were valued at a combined $100,000. A 1921 fire did minimal damage to the home, but caused an uproar as a jury trial was convened to determine allegations that Anna along with an associate had conspired to collect insurance money on the home. Neither Anna nor the associate were found guilty, but the court ruled that Anna was insane and she was subsequently committed to Eastern State Hospital — a similar fate to that of Susan Glover, wife of Spokane's founder James N. Glover, whose impressive Glover Mansion is located just a block to the east and also listed on the NRHP. After release from Eastern State Hospital three years later, Anna converted the upper story to apartments in 1930. The change to the interior is visible, but does not detract from the historic nature of the structure. She sold the property to the city in 1945, on the conditions that it be used as a park and that she be allowed to live out her life on the property. She died in 1950 at the age of 76. The grounds became part of Pioneer Park, now known as Edwidge Woldson Park. The house itself was initially an art center for Washington State College before transferring to the city parks department as an art center. The property was listed on the NRHP on its own merit, in addition to as a contributing property to this historic district, in 2004.

==== Austin Corbin House ====
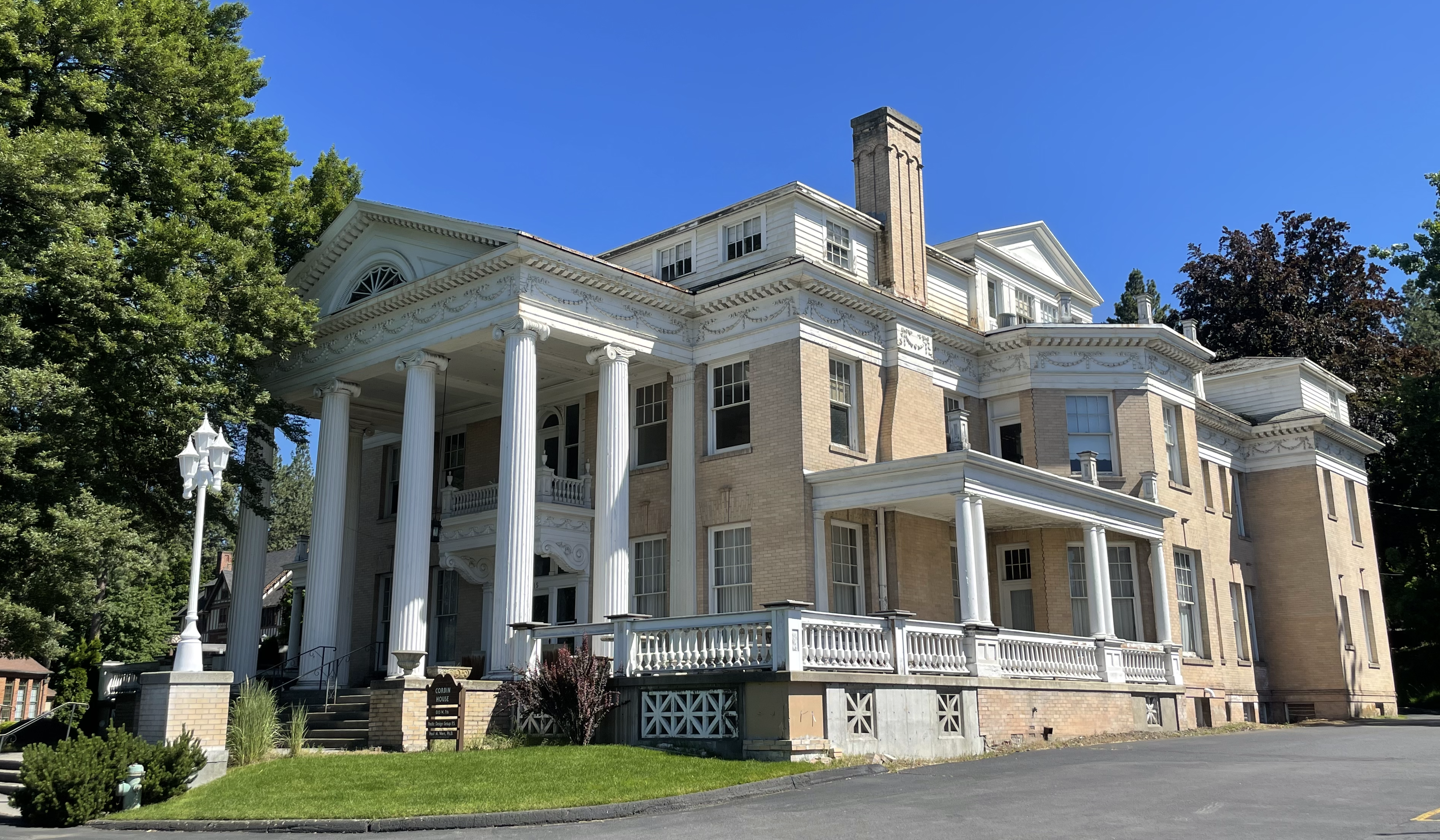
Austin Corbin House in June 2022

Located at 815 W. Seventh Ave., the Austin Corbin house is a Colonial Revival home built in 1898 and designed by Kirtland Cutter. It was built as a 17-room mansion for Austin Corbin, son of Daniel Corbin, and his wife. The younger Corbin worked in his father's business as vice president of the family's three railroad lines, a sugar company, and irrigation ventures. The two Corbins' homes were built at the same time, designed by the same architect, and just a block apart, but the younger Corbin's home was designed to be far more imposing from the exterior. Located on a seven-acre lot overlooking the city, the northern façade features a two-story portico at the central entrance with six Ionic columns supporting the pediment.

Marycliff High School was founded in 1929, and by the 1940s the Austin Corbin House had been given to the Catholic diocese for use by the all-girls school. The school was closed at the end of the school year in 1979. In the early 1980s the campus, along with the Austin Corbin House, was converted into an office park.

==== F. Lewis Clark House and Gatehouse ====
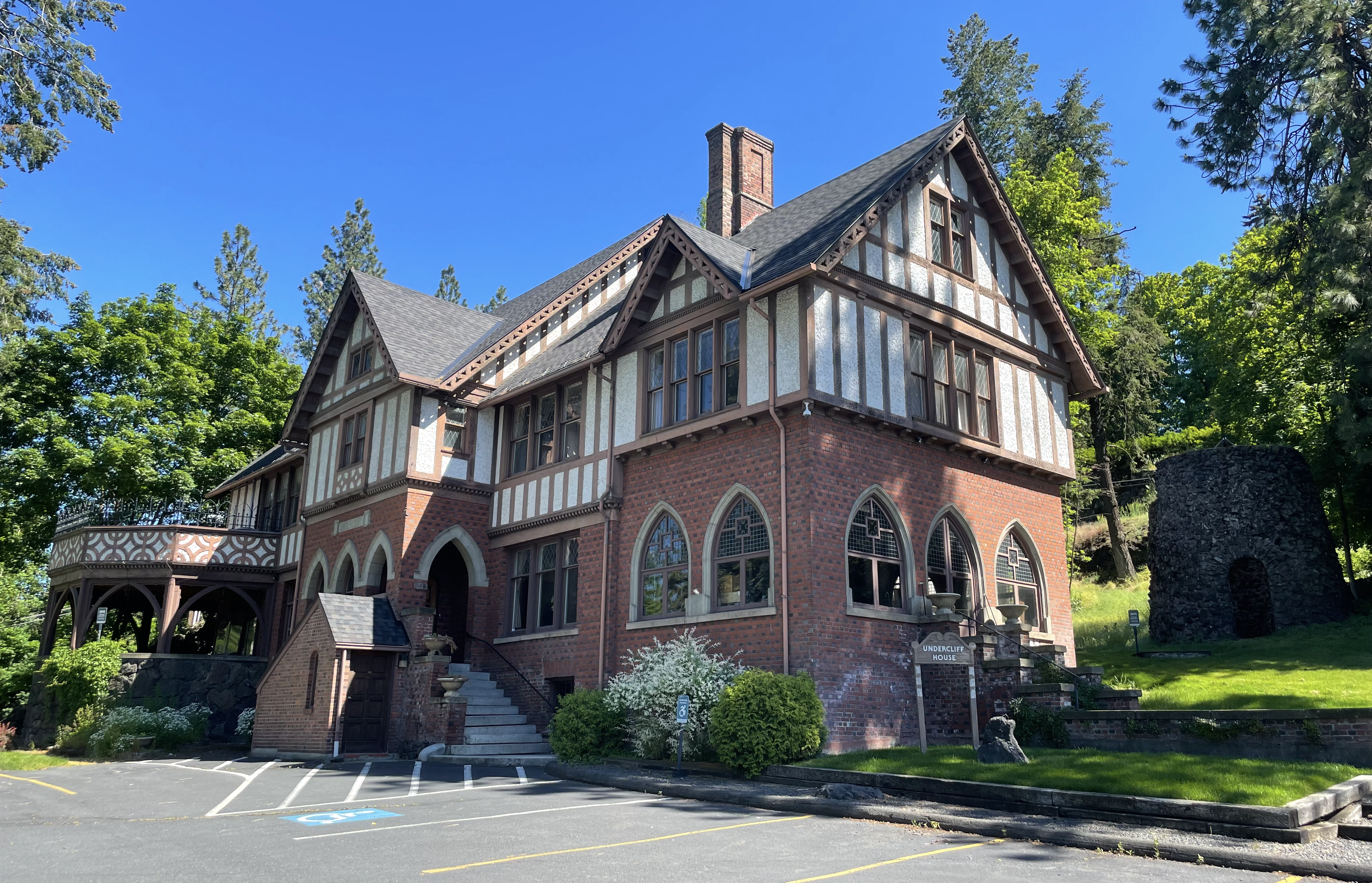
F. Lewis Clark House in June 2022

Located at 703 W. Seventh, the F. Lewis Clark House, or Undercliff House as it was called by Clark and is commonly known, is a Tudor Revival home designed by Kirtland Cutter and built in 1896. The home would host numerous high-society functions and social events in its early years. The home was designed to host gatherings like those, with its plans including a billiard room, a ballroom, a large porch on the northern façade overlooking the city, and formal English gardens with red brick paths that matched the brickwork on the home. Like the other extant homes in the Marycliff section, it is located along the hillside overlooking downtown, though it is the farthest back of the remaining homes and closest to the basalt cliff. A number of basalt outcroppings are located around the home, some of which are close enough that they were included in Cutter's design for the structure. A cistern was built adjacent to the home out of basalt rocks. There was also an ice house on the property as well as several greenhoues. Prior to the construction of Marycliff High School in 1929, the manicured lawns and gardens sloped down from the house to Seventh Avenue, where a gatehouse was located.

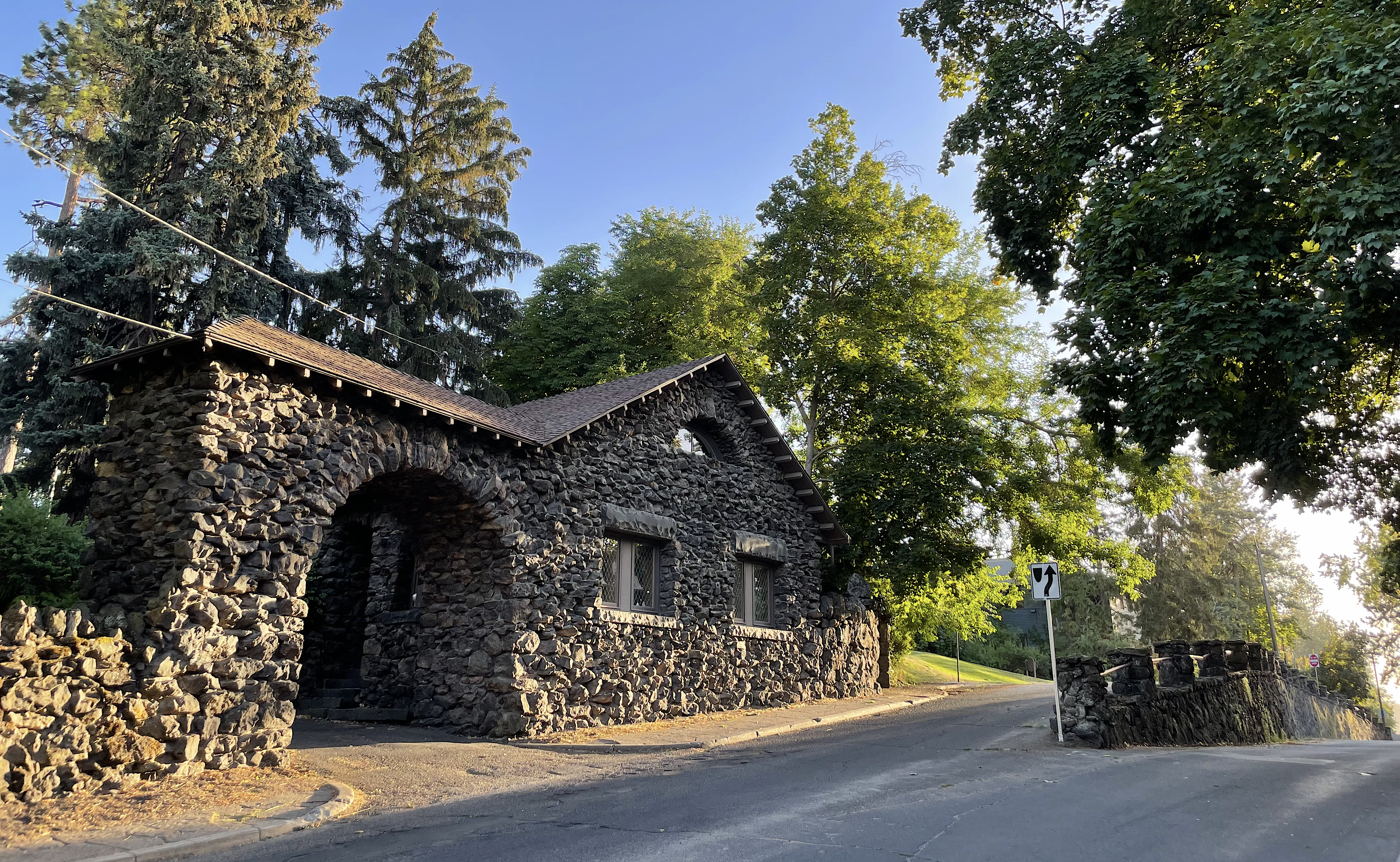
F. Lewis Clark Gatehouse in August 2022

The home was built for F. Lewis Clark, a Harvard educated businessman from a wealthy East Coast family who arrived in Spokane in 1884. After arriving in Spokane, Clark purchased the city's first mill and, together with partner F. E. Curtis — who would later have his own home built in Marycliff — constructed another mill and several grain elevators. After diversifying his investments into mining as well as milling, Clark constructed an estate at Hayden Lake in North Idaho and sold the Undercliff House to B. L. Gordon for $100,000 in 1909. After the death of Gordon, his widow gave the home and its seven-acre property to the Catholic diocese to be used as part of Marycliff High School. After the closure of the high school in 1979, the Undercliff House, along with the rest of the campus, was developed into an office park.

A carriage and gate house was built for the property where it fronted along Seventh Avenue, which is also considered to be a pivotal property in the NRHP listing. The house with its arched gate were constructed out of basalt rocks.

=== Gallery ===
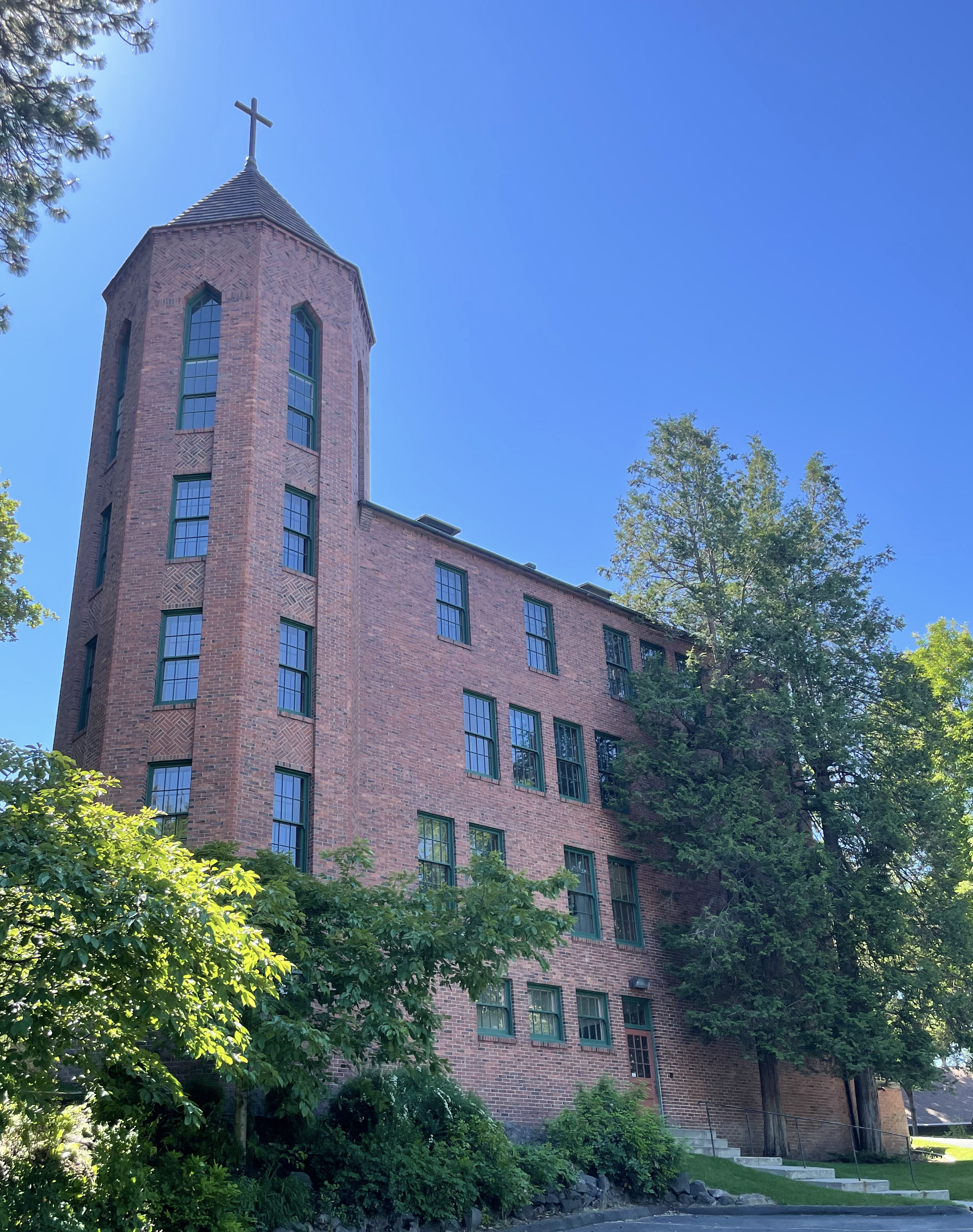
Marycliff Hall, built 1929 for Marycliff High School

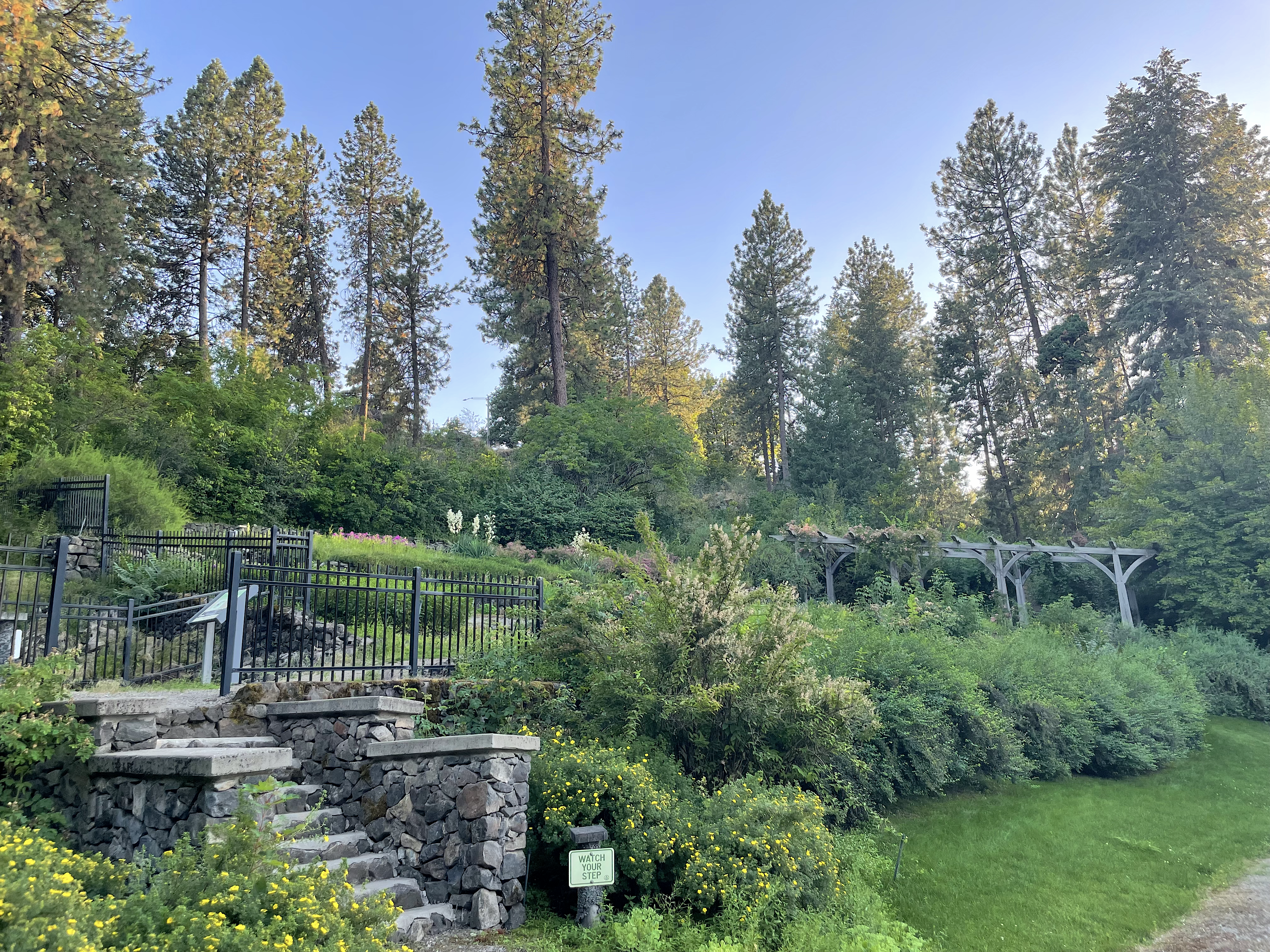
Looking up at the Moore-Turner Gardens

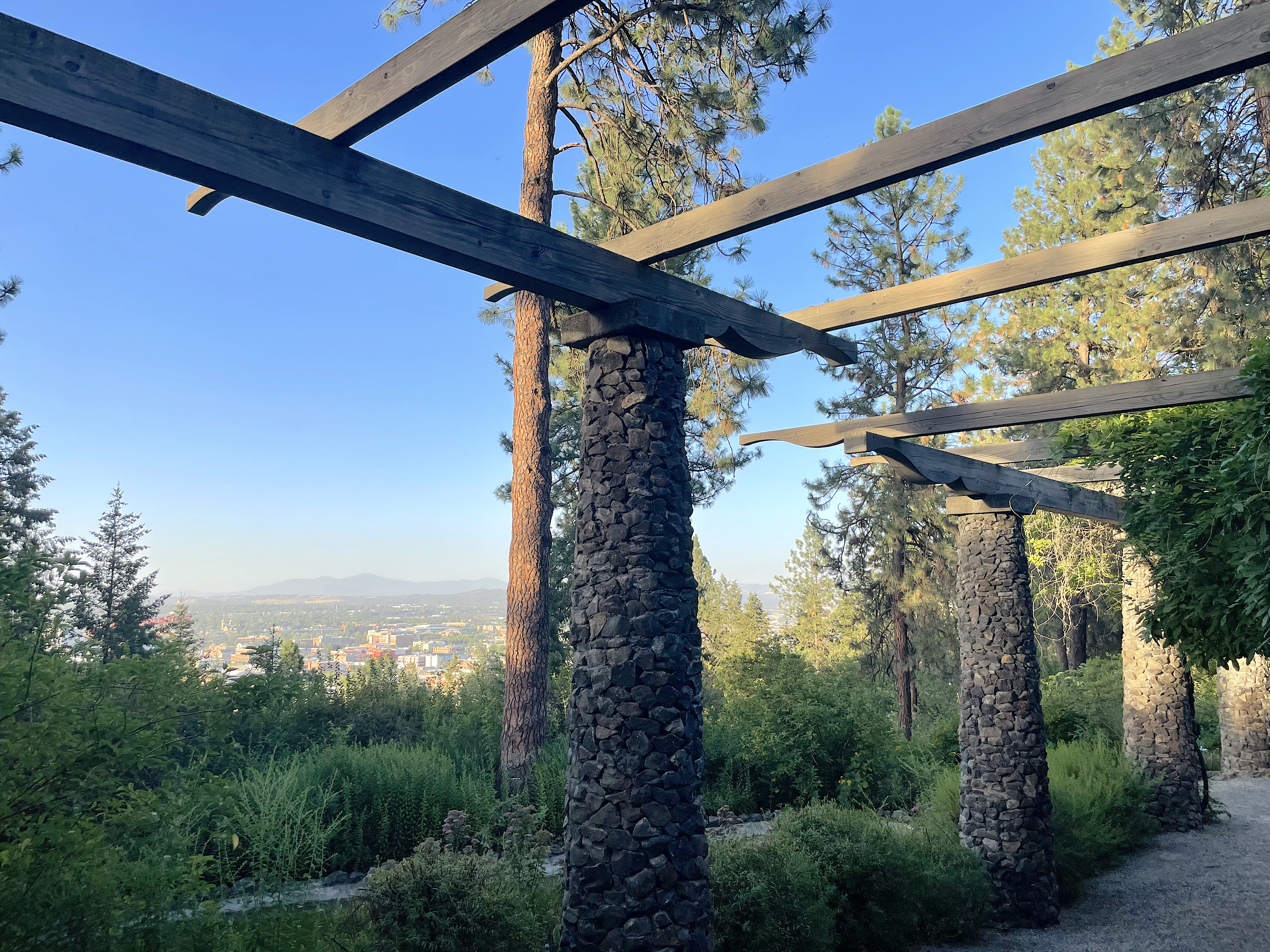
View from near the top of the Moore-Turner Gardens

=== Historical images ===
D.C. Corbin House between 1900 and 1910

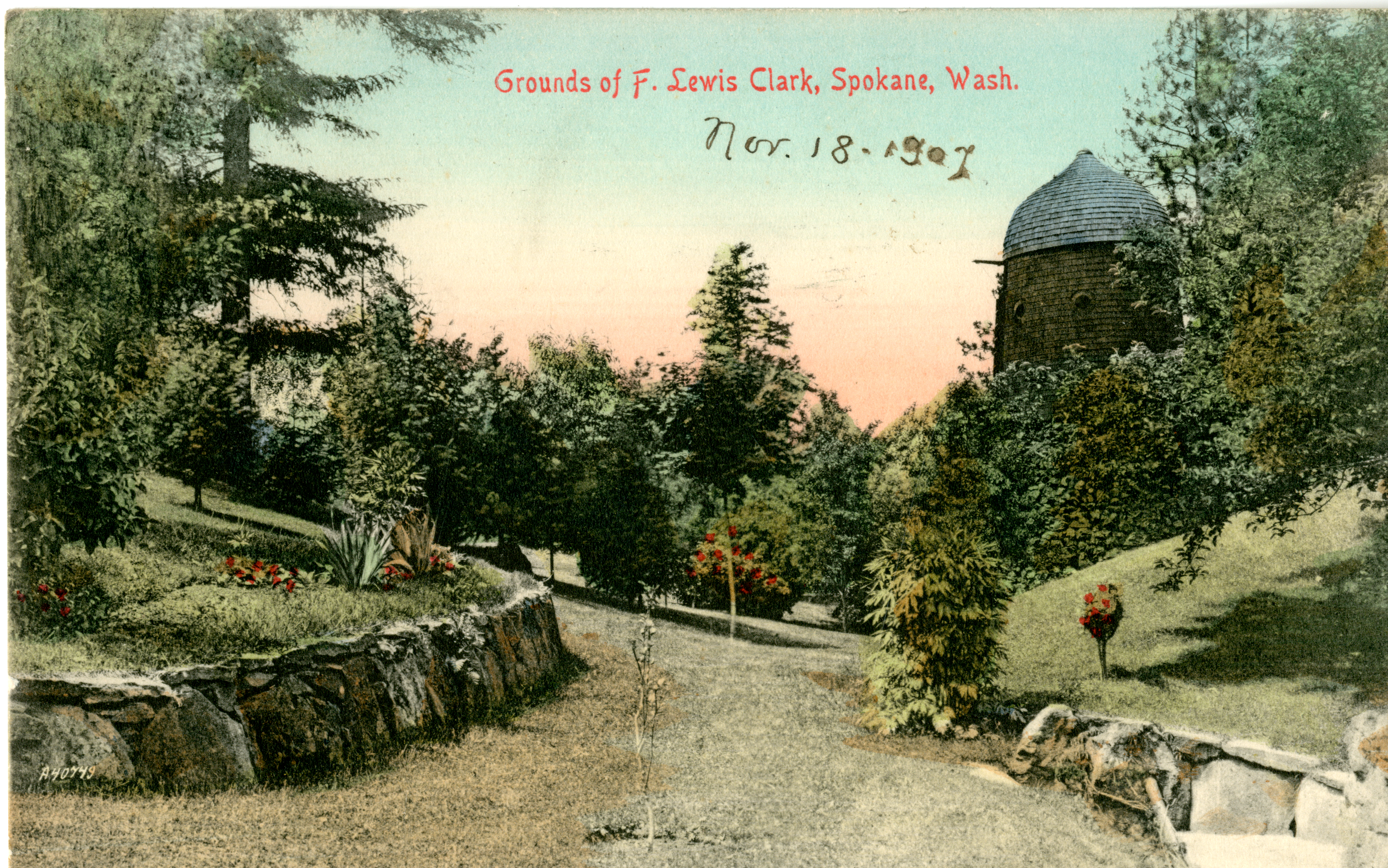
Grounds of the Undercliff House, 1907

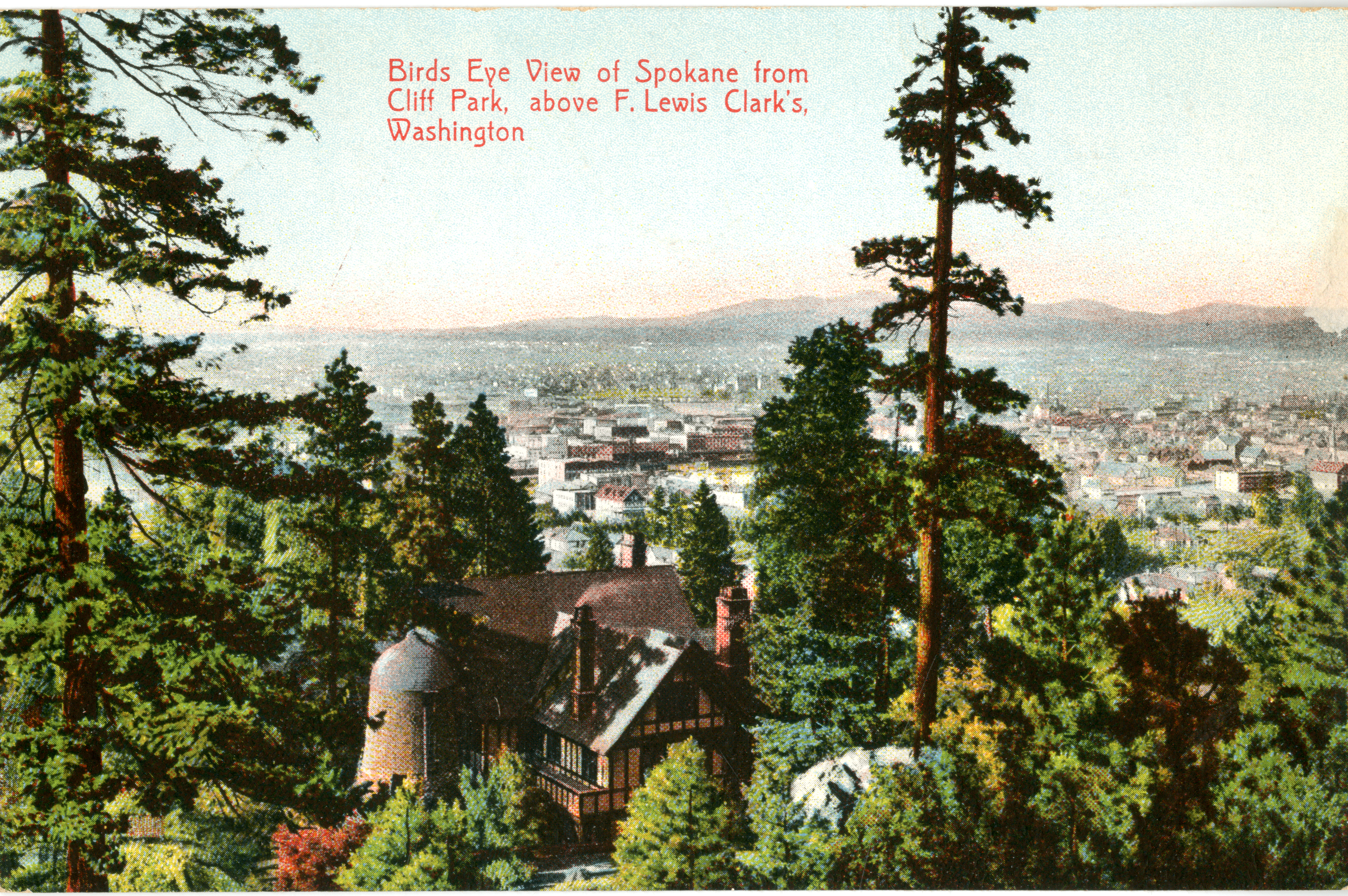
Undercliff House from above, 1908

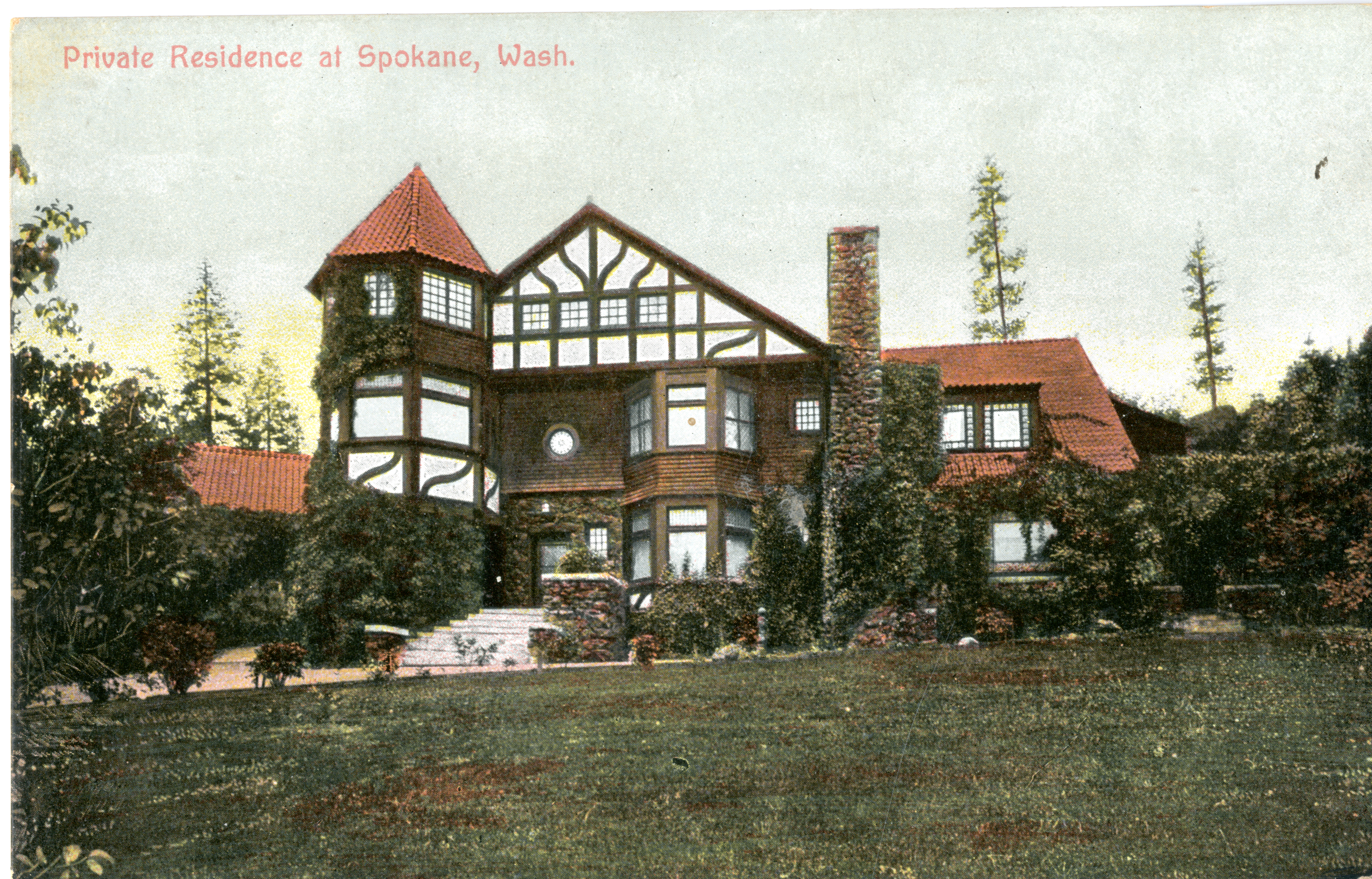
Moore-Turner House between 1910 and 1915, demolished 1940

== Cliff Park ==
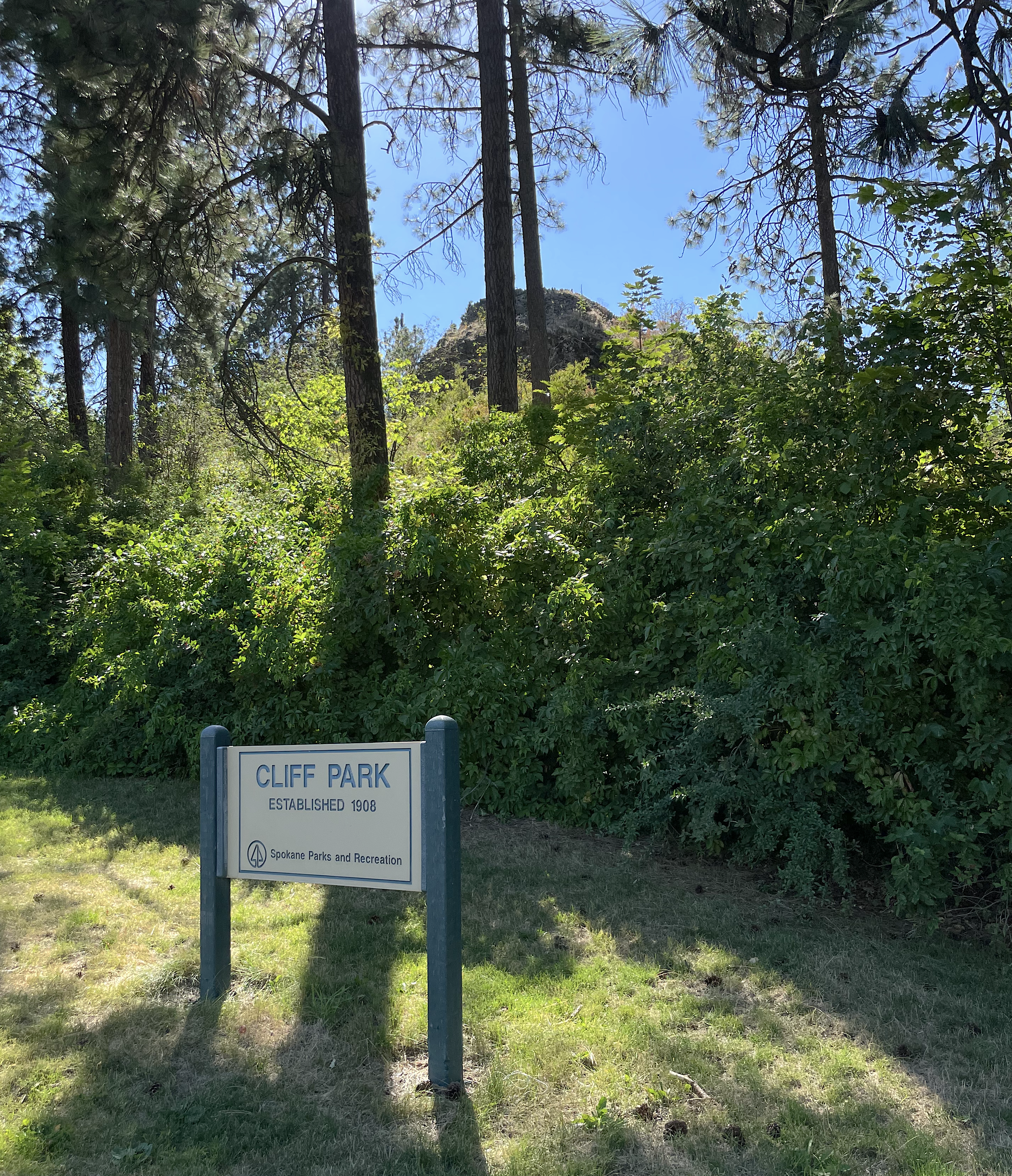
Cliff Park showing the prominent basalt outcrop

The Cliff Park section of the historic district surrounds the eponymous Cliff Park, a public park that is located not on Cliff Drive, nor along the cliff that runs along the ridge above Marycliff. Instead, Cliff Park surrounds a basalt outcrop that rises over 60 feet above the surrounding terrain and provides sweeping views in all directions. Aside from the outcrop in Cliff Park itself, this section of the historic district is relatively flat. It is located atop the cliff on the southern face of Spokane's South Hill, where the land levels off before beginning to rise steadily again to the south of the district. 14th Avenue serves as the southern boundary and Cliff Drive serves as the northern boundary, beyond which lies the Marycliff section of the district. To the west, the boundary winds along a ridge that drops off to the west and runs along Ben Garnett Way/Grove Street in the east, though there is a salient extending east between Sumner and Cliff Drive for two blocks that is part of the district as well.

The Cliff Park area is distinct from Marycliff not only geographically, but also by the market of homeowner it served as it was being developed. Marycliff was home to palatial mansions for the city's elite, while the Cliff Park section, aside from the homes along Cliff Drive atop the cliff itself, were more reserved and intended for middle to upper-middle class residents. Development of this area began by 1905. While the homes in Marycliff were generally built in various revival styles, the homes in Cliff Park were more often of the Bungalow style. Even the largest homes in the Cliff Park section, between Sumner Ave. and Cliff Drive, were smaller and more toned-down than their predecessors below the cliff. It has largely retained its historic character to this day.

=== Pivotal properties ===
==== North 500 Block of West Sumner ====
The north side of the 500 Block of West Sumner Ave. has four houses, all of which are listed as pivotal properties in the NRHP listing for the Marycliff-Cliff Park Historic District. All four homes front Sumner Ave. on the south, but they are laid out to take advantage of the view to the north, where the cliff falls off almost immediately beyond their property lines.

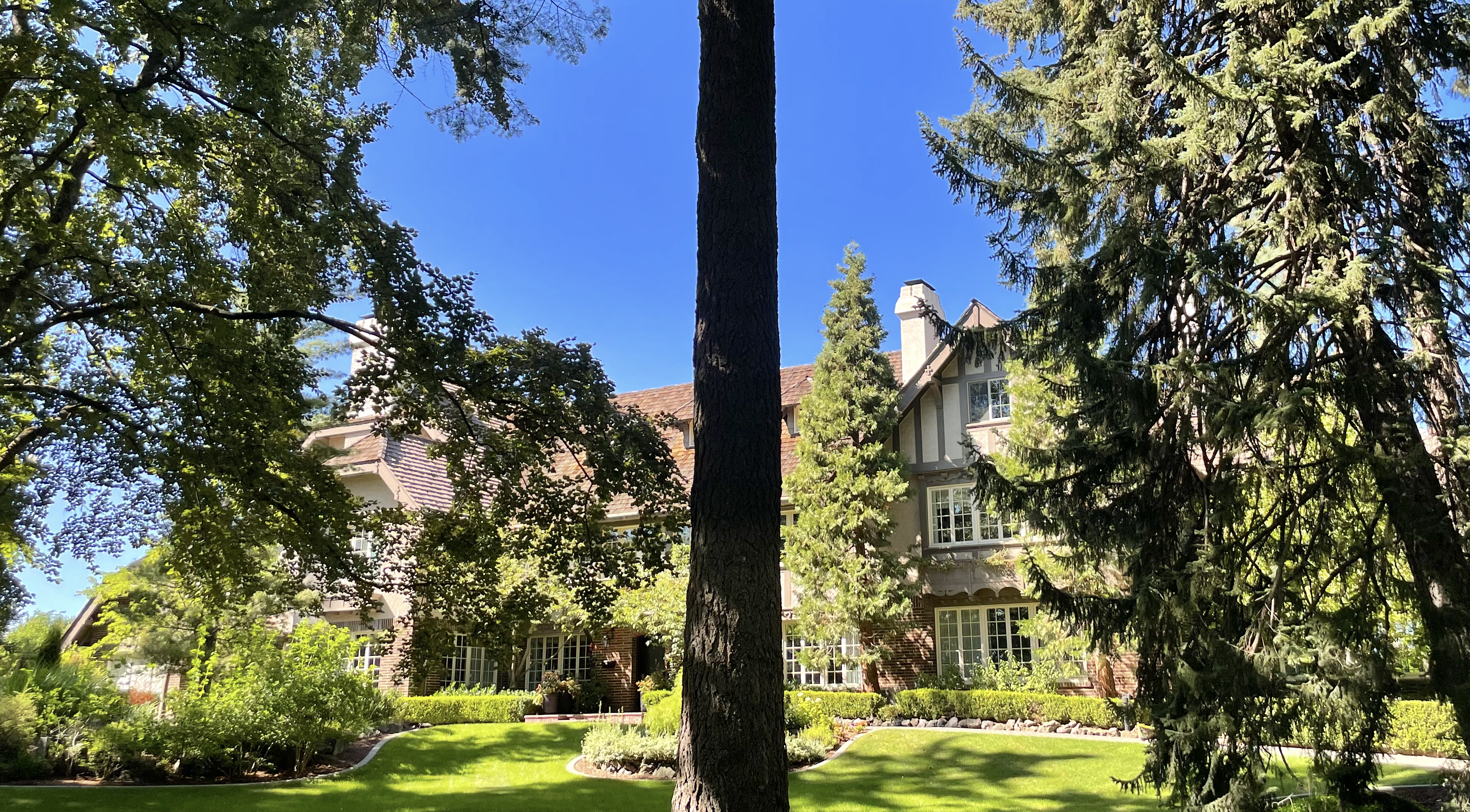
612 W. Sumner, a pivotal property

==== South 500 Block of West Sumner ====
The south side of the 500 Block of West Sumner is an extra-long block that extends into the 600 Block on its western end. It has six properties, four of which contribute to the historic district and two of which are considered intrusive. The pivotal property on this block is at 503 West Sumner, known as the Richard & Jessie Nuzum House or Nuzum House for short. It was built in 1912, and designed by Kirtland Cutter, in a 17th-century-inspired "black and white" Tudor style. Spokane attorney Richard Nuzum purchased the house in 1916 and lived there with his wife, Jessie, for three decades.

==== North 600 Block of West Sumner ====
Located at 612 W. Sumner, this is by far the largest structure in the Cliff Park section of the historic district. The house is on the northwestern corner of Wall St. and Sumner Ave., but Wall does not pass through Sumner here. The home, built in 1917 and designed by Kirtland Cutter, is a large Tudor Revival home with Jacobethan accents. Like the rest of the homes built between Sumner and Cliff Drive, it has more fenestration to the north, looking out over the cliff.

=== Gallery ===
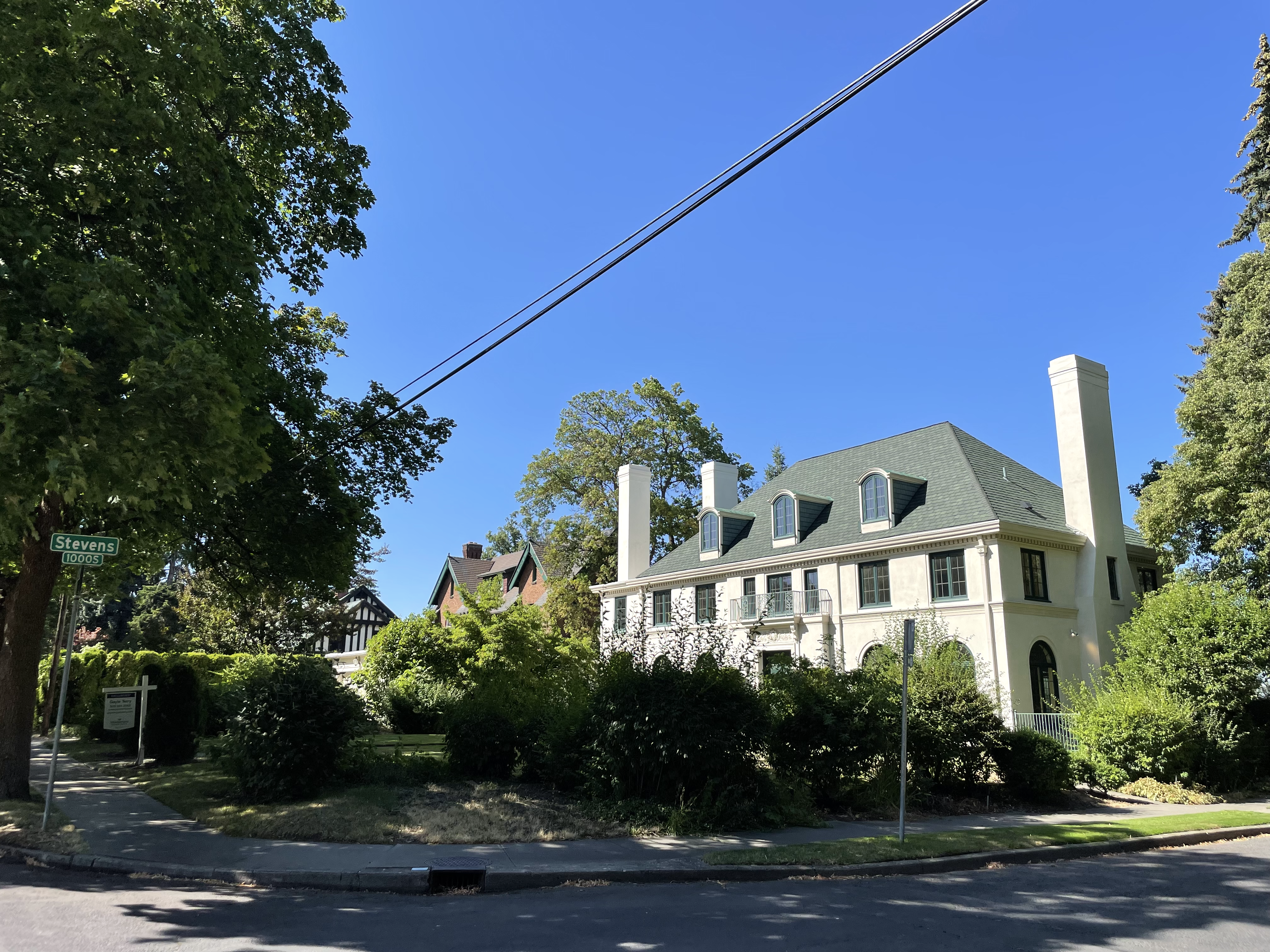
500 Block West Sumner looking northwest

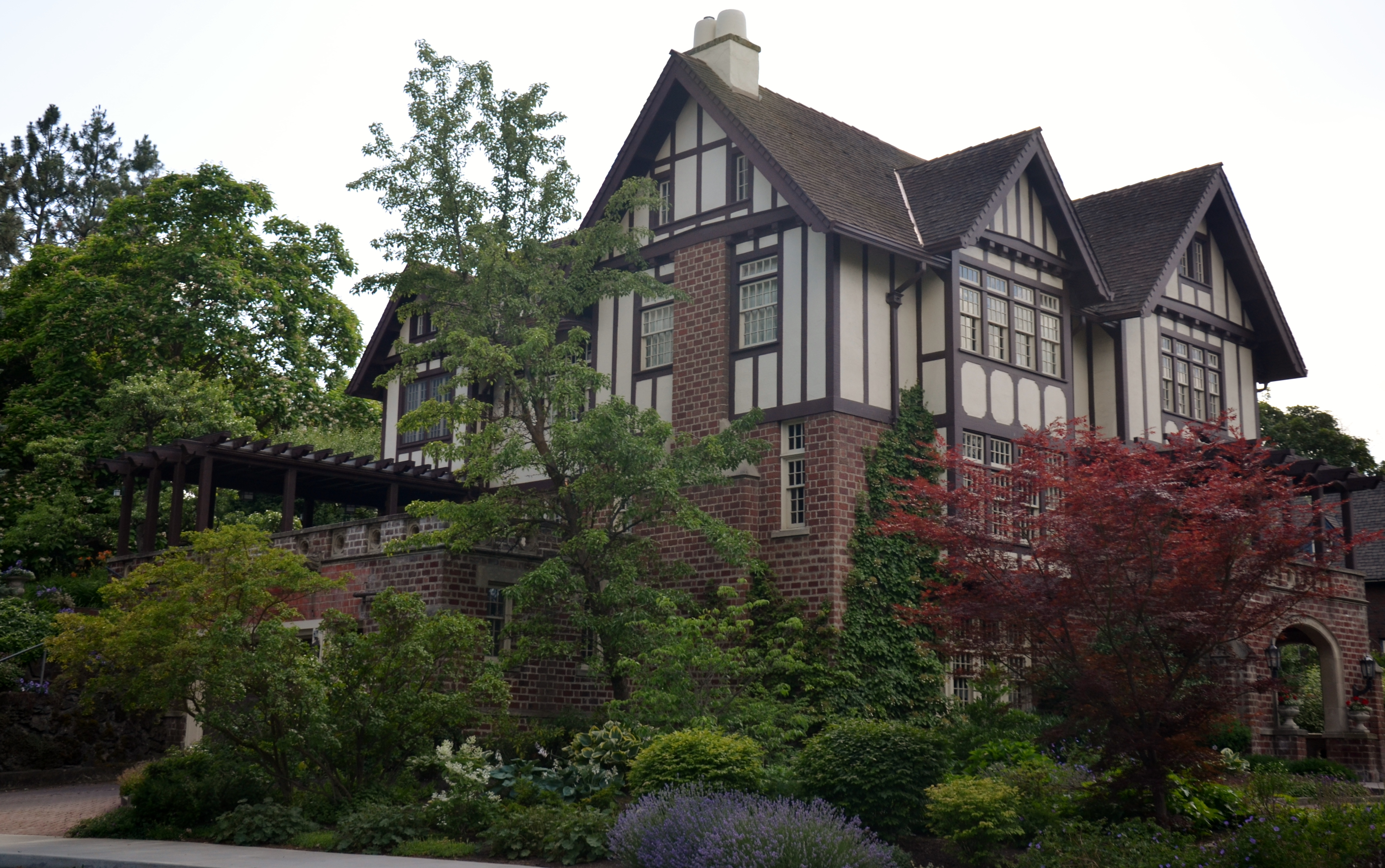
Nuzum House

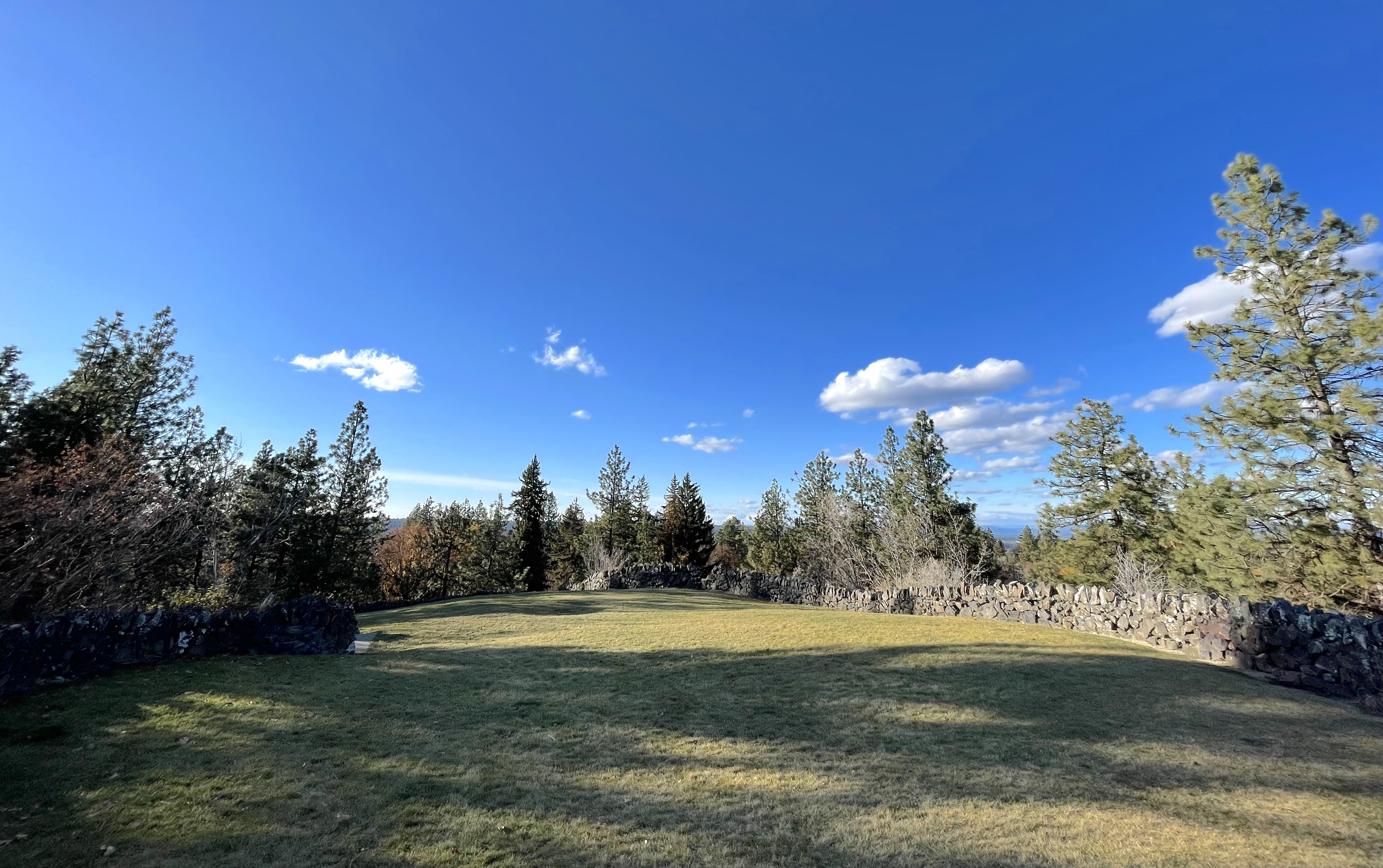
Lawn atop Cliff Park

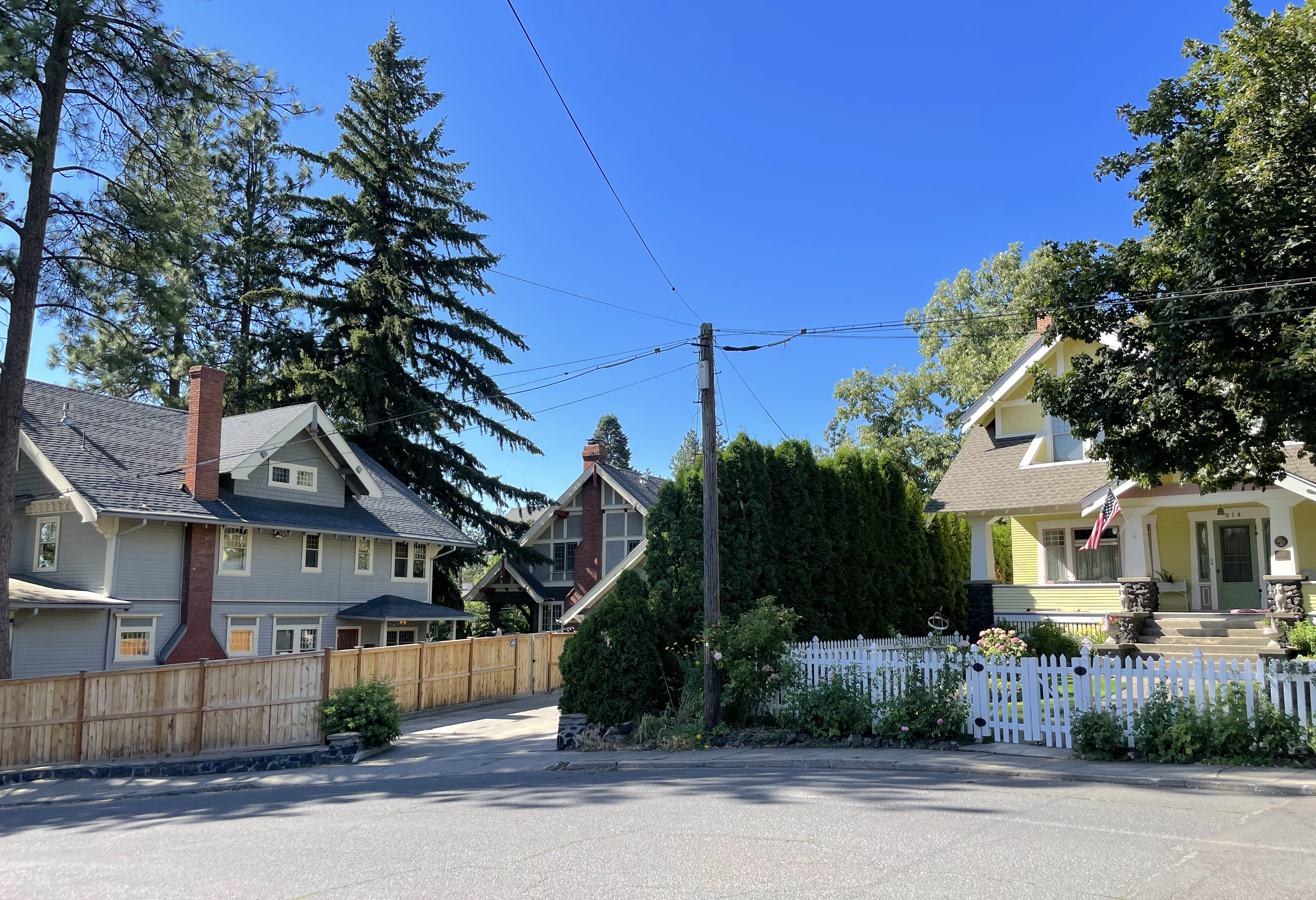
Three contributing properties at Wall and 13th

== See also ==
- Cliff/Cannon, Spokane
- National Register of Historic Places listings in Spokane County, Washington
